= Gloucester Catholic High School =

Private high school in Camden County, New Jersey, US

Location
- 333 Ridgeway Street; Gloucester City, Camden County, New Jersey 08030; United States; 39°53′47″N 75°7′28″W

Information
- Type: Private, Coeducational
- Religious affiliation: Catholic
- Patron saint: St. Mary
- Established: 1926
- NCES School ID: 00865235
- President: Glenn J. Benjamin
- Principal: Thomas Iacovone
- Faculty: 19.8 FTEs
- Grades: 7–12
- Enrollment: 270 (as of 2023–24)
- Student to teacher ratio: 13.6:1
- Colors: Maroon & gold
- Slogan: “Once a Ram, Always a Ram!” “Our Family Educating Your Family in the Catholic Tradition”
- Athletics conference: Tri-County Conference (general); West Jersey Football League (football)
- Mascot: Atlas
- Team name: Rams
- Rivals: Gloucester City High School, Bishop Eustace Preparatory School, Paul VI High School
- Accreditation: Middle States Association of Colleges and Schools
- Publication: Ramblings
- Newspaper: Rampage
- Yearbook: Maryan
- Tuition: $11,950 (for 2026–27)
- Website: www.gchsrams.org

Gloucester Catholic High School is a co-educational six-year Catholic high school located in Gloucester City, in Camden County, in the U.S. state of New Jersey. The school is managed by the Diocese of Camden. The school serves students in seventh through twelfth grades. Gloucester Catholic High School has been accredited by the Middle States Association of Colleges and Schools Commissions on Elementary and Secondary Schools since 1991.

As of the 2023–24 school year, the school had an enrollment of 270 students and 19.8 classroom teachers (on an FTE basis), for a student–teacher ratio of 13.6:1. The school serves students who feed into the high school from 50 different parochial and public schools within the Diocese of Camden.

For the class of 2017, the school reported that 90% of the students went on to college (56% to four-year institutions, and 34% to two-year institutions), while 10% into the military, trade schools or the workforce. Scholarship and grant money awarded to this class totaled over $14 million.

== History ==
After opening in 1926, the school had its first graduating class of 27 students in June 1930. Through the 1940s, the school's enrollment varied between 150 and 200. After World War II, the school added a gymnasium and classrooms to its building on Cumberland Street, to accommodate enrollment that rose as high as 300 during the 1950s, and reached 700 in the 1970s. Under the leadership of John Colman, who became the school's first lay principal in 1999, enrollment at Gloucester Catholic had grown to 850 at its height. Students came to GC from Gloucester County, as well as from Burlington, Camden and Salem counties.

In the 2000s, the Diocese of Camden explored possibilities to move the school to Gloucester County, New Jersey. After a two-year study the diocese promoted the idea of moving the school to Deptford Township. Due to legal disputes, in 2005 the diocese announced that it would not build a new school in Deptford Township. Andrew Walton, the spokesperson for the diocese, said that the diocese would either renovate and/or expand the existing Gloucester Catholic or move it elsewhere. Walton added that the district would likely not take both actions at the same time. In 2008 the diocese announced that the district agreed to purchase a farm on a site along Route 77 and across from the Gloucester County 4-H grounds in the Mullica Hill community of Harrison Township for $5,000,000 and move Gloucester Catholic to the site by 2010. The new campus would be the first Catholic high school campus built in around 40 years. Walton said in 2008 that 60% of the families with children in the school live in Gloucester County. The diocese said that a survey polling parents from 15 elementary school and 30 parishes indicated support for the idea of relocating the school. A junior high (7th and 8th grades) was added in Spring 2011 following the closing of Saint Mary's Elementary School.

== Athletics ==
Gloucester Catholic High School Rams compete as one of the member schools in the Tri-County Conference, which is comprised of public and private high schools located in Camden, Cape May, Cumberland, Gloucester and Salem counties. The conference is overseen by the New Jersey State Interscholastic Athletic Association (NJSIAA). With 333 students in grades 10–12, the school was classified by the NJSIAA for the 2019–20 school year as Non-Public B for most athletic competition purposes, which included schools with an enrollment of 37 to 366 students in that grade range (equivalent to Group I for public schools). The football team competes in the Horizon Division of the 94-team West Jersey Football League superconference and was classified by the NJSIAA as Non-Public Group B (equivalent to Group I/II for public schools) for football for 2024–2026, which included schools with 140 to 686 students.

The school was recognized as the Group B winner of the NJSIAA ShopRite Cup in 2006–07. The award recognized the school for achieving first-place finishes in baseball and boys' golf; second in boys' bowling and boys' tennis; and ties for third place in girls' soccer, boys' swimming, boys' basketball and softball.

Through the 2016–2017 school year, Gloucester Catholic had won 59 state titles, including baseball (18 - most in NJ), football (10), girls' basketball (10), softball (8), girls' soccer (6), boys' basketball (3), golf (2), and boys' track and field (2).

=== Boys' basketball ===
The boys' basketball team won the Non-Public Group B state championship in 1964 (defeating St. Aloysius High School in the tournament final), 1970 (vs. Saint Joseph of the Palisades High School) and 1972 (vs. Paterson Catholic High School).

Gloucester Catholic's first state championship was delivered by the 1964 basketball team, who won the Group B title in Atlantic City Convention Hall. They were led by Bill Somerset, Mike Baker, Jack Fink, Bud Shodder, and John Murphy. As South Jersey's number one-ranked team, Coach Ray Ford's team posted a 22–1 record during "that championship season."

A crowd of more than 7,500 at Convention Hall in Atlantic City watched the 1970 team finish the season with a record of 21-5 after winning the Parochial B state title with a 71–59 win against St. Joseph's.

The boys' basketball team, under the direction of Coach Ralph Saquella, won the Parochial B state championships in 1972, defeating Paterson Catholic by a score of 44–39 in the championship game. Coach Saquella, who won his 100th career victory in 1972, went on to become the head coach at Glassboro State College.

=== Girls' basketball ===
The team won the Group I state championship in 1976 (defeating runner-up St. Anthony High School in the tournament final), 1977 (vs. Mother Seton Regional High School), 1978 (vs. Mother Seton), 1979 (vs. Eastern Christian High School), 1981 (vs. Benedictine Academy) and 1982 (vs. Morris Catholic High School), and won the Non-Public Group B title in 1983 (vs. St. Anthony). The program's seven state titles are tied for seventh-most statewide.

Bertha "Bert" Nolan won an estimated 500 games as coach during her career, leading the Lady Rams basketball team to win the 1973 state championship, the first offered in the sport, repeating as winners of the state title in 1976.

Using its speed, the 1976 team beat St. Anthony 63–52 to pull away and win the Group I championship game against St. Anthony of Jersey City

The 1977 team won the Group I state title with a 72–66 victory against Mother Seton in the championship game. A last-second defensive play helped the team repeat as Group I champion in 1978 with a 70–68 win against Mother Seton in the playoff finals.

=== Football ===
The football team won state sectional titles in Non-Public B South in 1971 (awarded by the NJSIAA) and 1979 (via playoff). The 1979 team finished the season with a 10–1 record after winning the Non-Public B South title with a 13–7 win against Bishop Eustace in the championship game.

=== Baseball ===
The baseball team has enjoyed a long history of success starting in the early 1970s. The team won the Non-Public B state championship in 1973 (defeating Paterson Catholic High School in the tournament final), 1974 (vs. Paul VI High School), 1980 (vs. St. Mary High School of Jersey City), 1984 (vs. Bayley-Ellard High School), 1985 (vs. Immaculata High School), 1986 (vs. Phillipsburg Catholic High School), 1993 (vs. Marist High School), 1996 (vs. Pope John XXIII Regional High School), 2001 (vs. St. Mary High School of Rutherford), 2003 (vs. St. Mary of Rutherford), 2007 (vs. Newark Academy), 2010 (vs. Morristown–Beard School), 2011 and 2017 (vs. Newark Academy both years), and won the Non-Public A title in 1999 (vs. Saint Joseph Regional High School of Montvale), 2000 (vs. Seton Hall Preparatory School), 2012 vs. Don Bosco Preparatory High School), 2013 (vs. Seton Hall Prep), 2017 (vs. Newark Academy), 2018 (vs. DePaul Catholic High School), 2019 (vs. St. Mary of Rutherford) and 2024 (vs. St. Thomas Aquinas High School). The program's 21 state titles are the most of any school statewide.

The 1996 team finished the season with a record of 29-2-1 (with both losses to out-of-state opponents) after winning the program's record eighth state title with a 9–1 victory against Pope John XXIII in the playoff finals.

The 2000 team beat Seton Hall Prep by a score of 13–4 in the Parochial A championship game to finish with a 33–1 mark for the year.

The 2001 team finished the season with a 26–4 record after winning the Parochial B title with a 6–0 victory against St. Mary of Rutherford, the program's third consecutive title and eleventh overall.

The 2003 team finished the season with a record of 25-5 after a one-hitter in the Parochial B championship game against St. Mary of Rutherford, which they won by a score of 3–0.

In 2013, the Rams became only the second program in New Jersey history to capture four straight NJSIAA state championships when they topped Seton Hall Prep by a 2–0 score in the tournament final for the Non-Public A title; the state title was the 17th in program history, a state record. The 2013 campaign was the first for head coach Mike Rucci, a former standout Rams' player who took over for coach Dennis Barth, now at Rutgers-Camden. The 2017 team defeated Newark Academy by a score of 15–5 in the playoff final of the Non-Public B tournament, to win the program's 18th state title.

The baseball program produced two of New Jersey's greatest seasons on record in 1980 and 2000. Under head coach Al Radano, the 1980 squad posted a perfect 24–0 record to win the New Jersey Parochial B state championship. The team was voted "Team of the Century" by Courier-Post readers in late 1999. In 2000, Gloucester Catholic was crowned national champions after winning a state title and posting a 33-1 overall record under head coach Dennis Barth. Led by Rucci, a catcher, along with pitcher Greg Burke, the Rams defeated some of the best teams in the state and the country that season. The Rams won four consecutive Non-Parochial South B titles from 1983 to 1986, and went on to win the Group B state championship in 1984, 1985 and 1986.

=== Softball ===
The softball team won the Non-Public B state championship in 1987 (defeating Immaculata High School in the tournament final), 1988 (vs. DePaul Catholic High School), in 1990 and 1991 (vs. St. Mary High School both years), 2001 (vs. Montclair Kimberley Academy), 2003 (vs. St. Mary), 2010 (vs. Immaculate Conception High School) and 2011 (vs. Morris Catholic High School). The program's eight state championships are tied for second-most among all schools in the state and the program's 13 appearances in tournament final matches are the second most in the state.

The team won the Parochial South B state sectional championship in 2001 with a 1–0 win over St. Joseph High School in the tournament final. The team repeated the win in the Parochial South B sectional championship with a 4–0 win over Bishop Eustace Preparatory School in the 2002 tournament. The team won their third consecutive title in 2003 with a 1–0 win in fifteen innings against Bishop Eustace. The 2006 team won the South B title with a 5–0 win against Bishop Eustace. The 2007 team won the North B state championship with an 11–6 win against Newark Academy.

In the 2010 Non-Public B championship game, the team finished the season with a 23–6 record as they defeated Immaculate Conception of Lodi by a score of 11–1.

The team won its second consecutive Non-Public B state championship in 2011 with a 4–0 win against Morris Catholic High School in the tournament final, finishing the season with a 21–4 record.

=== Girls' soccer ===
The girls soccer team was Group II state champion in 1997 (as co-champion with Glen Rock High School) and 1998 (co-champion with West Morris Mendham High School), won the Non-Public Group B state title in 2000 vs. Morris Catholic High School, 2005 vs. Villa Walsh Academy, 2009 vs. Villa Walsh, and won the non-public Group A title in 2007 vs. Immaculate Heart Academy. The program's six state titles are tied for eight-most in the state.

The girls' soccer team won the 2000 Parochial South B state sectional championship, defeating Wildwood Catholic High School 5–0 in the tournament final.

In 2007, the team won the Non-Public South A state sectional championship with a 3–0 win over Holy Spirit High School in the tournament final. The team moved on to win the Group A state championship with a 3–0 win over Immaculate Heart Academy.

The 2009 team finished the season with an 18-1-2 record after winning the Non-Public B state title, the program's sixth, with a 2–0 win against Villa Walsh in the championship game.

== Track and field ==
The boys track team won the Non-Public Group B spring / outdoor track state championship in 2001 and 2002.

=== Tennis ===
The 2006 boys' tennis team won the Non-Public, South B state sectional championship with a 3–2 win against Bishop Eustace. The team repeated the feat in 2007 with a 3–2 win vs. Wildwood Catholic High School in the final matches of the tournament.

=== Golf ===
The 2006 and 2007 golf teams won Non-Public Group B state championships. The 2007 golf team won the state Tournament of Champions and finished the season ranked number one in the state by The Star-Ledger.

== Administration ==
In January 2021, Principal Edward Beckett resigned, bringing in assistant principal Thomas Iacovone as interim principal.

== Notable people ==
=== Alumni ===
- George Anastasia (born 1947, class of 1965), author and journalist for The Philadelphia Inquirer and an expert on the American mafia
- Agnus Berenato (born 1956), women's basketball head coach, Kennesaw State University
- Zach Braddock (born 1987), professional baseball pitcher who played for the Milwaukee Brewers
- Greg Burke (born 1982), professional baseball pitcher, San Diego Padres (2008–10), New York Mets (2013)
- Jack Collins (born 1943), politician who served Speaker of the New Jersey General Assembly from 1996 until 2002
- Nick Comoroto (born 1991, class of 2009) professional wrestler with WWE and All Elite Wrestling
- Daniel Dalton (born 1949, class of 1967), politician who served as New Jersey Senate Majority Leader and as Secretary of State of New Jersey
- Joe Fields (born 1953, class of 1971), professional football center who played for the New York Jets and New York Giants (1975–1988)
- Johnny Gaudreau (1993-2024), professional hockey player who played for the Columbus Blue Jackets and Calgary Flames
- Francis J. Gorman (1924-1987, class of 1942), politician who served seven terms in the New Jersey General Assembly
- Patrick T. Harker (born 1958), president of the University of Delaware
- Sue Lowden (born 1952, class of 1970), State Senator in Nevada (1993-1997)
- Fred H. Madden (born 1954, class of 1972), New Jersey State Senator since 2004, representing the 4th Legislative District
- Buddy Robinson (born 1991), professional ice hockey player currently playing for Traktor Chelyabinsk
- Eric Robinson (born 1995, class of 2013), ice hockey winger for the Carolina Hurricanes
- Bob Sebra (1961-2020), former Major League Baseball pitcher from 1985 to 1990
- Mike Shawaryn (born 1994, class of 2013), professional baseball pitcher for the Boston Red Sox
- Anthony Solometo (born 2002), professional baseball pitcher for the Pittsburgh Pirates
- John Yurkow, head baseball coach at the University of Pennsylvania

=== Staff ===
- Browning Ross (1924–1998), former cross country and track coach; Ross was a two-time Olympian (1948, 1952) and two-time gold medal winner at the Pan American Games (1951)
