= Krysten =

- Krysten Anderson, American professional monster truck driver.
- Krysten Boogaard, Canadian basketball center
- Krysten Cummings, American stage and film actress
- Krysten Moore, American teen activist
- Krysten Ritter, American actress
