= Gordon Hill (American football) =

American football player (born 1993)

Profile
- Position: Safety

Personal information
- Born: February 25, 1993 (age 33); Sicklerville, New Jersey, U.S.
- Listed height: 5 ft 11 in (1.80 m)
- Listed weight: 210 lb (95 kg)

Career information
- High school: St. Joseph (Hammonton, New Jersey)
- College: Sacred Heart
- NFL draft: 2015: undrafted

Career history
- San Diego Chargers (2015)*
- * Offseason or practice squad member only
- Stats at Pro Football Reference

Gordon Hill (born February 25, 1993) is an American former football safety. He played college football at Sacred Heart. He was signed by the San Diego Chargers as an undrafted free agent in 2015. He is currently the cornerbacks coach for Sacred Heart University.

Hill grew up in Winslow Township, New Jersey and played high school football at St. Joseph High School.

== Professional career ==
=== San Diego Chargers ===
On May 2, 2016, the San Diego Chargers signed Hill to a free agent contract. Hill saw action in the Chargers' first two preseason games, accounting for a tackle in a 17–7 win over the Dallas Cowboys on August 13, and an assisted tackle in a 22–19 victory over the Arizona Cardinals on August 22. On September 1, 2016, the Chargers waived Hill due to roster cuts.
