= Bishop Eustace Preparatory School =

Catholic high school in Camden County, New Jersey, US

Location
- 5552 Route 70; Pennsauken Township, Camden County, New Jersey 08109-4798; United States; 39.9302°N 75.0650°W

Information
- Type: Private, parochial
- Motto: "Quod Deus Vult"
- Religious affiliation: Roman Catholic
- Patron saint: Saint Vincent Pallotti
- Established: 1954
- Oversight: Pallottines of the Immaculate Conception Province
- NCES School ID: 00865188
- Principal: Marylou Williams
- Head of school: Brother James Beamesderfer, SAC
- Chaplain: Rev. John Rose, SAC
- Faculty: 32.0 FTEs
- Grades: 9–12
- Gender: Coeducational
- Enrollment: 327 (as of 2023–24)
- Student to teacher ratio: 10.2:1
- Campus size: 32 acres (130,000 m^{2})
- Colors: Black gold white
- Slogan: The Tradition Is That of a Winner
- Athletics conference: Olympic Conference
- Mascot: Crusader
- Team name: Crusaders
- Rival: Camden Catholic High School, Paul VI High School, St. Augustine Preparatory School
- Accreditation: Middle States Association of Colleges and Schools
- Publication: Phoenix (literary magazine)
- Newspaper: Eustacian
- Yearbook: Crusader
- Tuition: $17,900 (2025–26)
- Affiliation: Association of Delaware Valley Independent Schools
- Website: www.eustace.org

Bishop Eustace Preparatory School is a Catholic coeducational, private high school in Pennsauken Township, New Jersey. Founded in 1954 by the priests and brothers of the Society of the Catholic Apostolate (The Pallottines), the school operates independently under the auspices of the Roman Catholic Diocese of Camden and was named after Bishop Bartholomew J. Eustace, first bishop of the diocese. The school is a coeducational institution (prior to 1972, it was all-male) serving students in ninth through twelfth grades. The school has been accredited by the Middle States Association of Colleges and Schools Commission on Elementary and Secondary Schools since 1977 and is accredited through July 2023.

As of the 2023–24 school year, the school had an enrollment of 327 students and 32.0 classroom teachers (on an FTE basis), for a student–teacher ratio of 10.2:1. The school's student body was 79.5% (260) White, 5.2% (17) Black, 4.0% (13) two or more races, 3.4% (11) Asian, 6.1% (11) Hispanic, 1.5% (5) Native Hawaiian / Pacific Islander and 0.3% (1) American Indian / Alaska Native.

The school is a member of the Association of Delaware Valley Independent Schools.

== History ==
The school was established in 1954 as a high school for boys operated under the Pallottines, with enrollment capped at 100 students in a freshman class, with a new class to be added each subsequent year. When the school opened in September 1954, the high school had 90 students.

The school became co-ed in 1972.

== Athletics ==
The Bishop Eustace Preparatory School Crusaders compete in the Olympic Conference, an athletic conference comprised of public and private high schools located in Burlington, Camden and Gloucester counties, operating under the supervision of the New Jersey State Interscholastic Athletic Association (NJSIAA). With 408 students in grades 10–12, the school was classified by the NJSIAA for the 2019–20 school year as Non-Public A for most athletic competition purposes, which included schools with an enrollment of 381 to 1,454 students in that grade range (equivalent to Group I for public schools). The football team competes in the Horizon Division of the 94-team West Jersey Football League superconference and was classified by the NJSIAA as Non-Public Group B (equivalent to Group I/II for public schools) for football for 2024–2026, which included schools with 140 to 686 students.

The school was recognized as the Group B winner of the NJSIAA ShopRite Cup in 2005–06. The award recognized the school for achieving 3rd in Girls Cross Country, a tie for 3rd in Football, 2nd in Boys Swimming, 2nd in Girls Indoor Track Relays, 2nd in Girls Indoor Track Championships, 1st in Baseball, a Tie for 3rd in Softball, a tie for 3rd in Boys Tennis and 2nd in Girls Outdoor Track.

The boys' basketball team Non-Public Group B state championship in 1961 vs. Holy Family High School (Union City), in 1973 vs. Our Lady of the Valley High School (Orange), in 1974 vs. Don Bosco Preparatory High School, in 1975 vs St. Cecilia High School of Englewood and in 1976 vs. Don Bosco, and won the Non-Public Group A championship in 1962 and 1969 vs. St. Peter's Preparatory School both years. The 1961 team won the Class B state title with a 54–46 overtime win against Holy Family in the tournament finals at Princeton University. Led by coach Joe O'Conner and by Gary Melchionni on the court, the 1969 team extended its winning streak to 26 games after winning the Parochial A state title with a 61–52 win against St. Peter's Preparatory School in the championship game. The 1975 team finished the season with a record of 20–7 after defeating St. Cecilia by a score of 79–41 to win the Parochial B state championship game.

The boys track team won the spring / outdoor track state championship in Non-Public B in 1969, 1992, 1995, 1996.

The baseball team won the Non-Public B state championship in 1972 (defeating Pope Pius XII Regional High School in the playoff finals), 1978 (vs. Paul VI High School), 1982 (vs. St. Mary of the Assumption High School of Elizabeth), 1990 (vs. St. Anthony High School), 2002 (vs. Montclair Kimberley Academy), 2004 (vs. Newark Academy) and 2006 (vs. St. Mary's), and won the Non-Public A title in 1997 (vs. Immaculata High School (New Jersey)). The program's eight state titles are tied for second-most in the state. The 1972 team defeated Pope Pius XII by a score of 3–1 in the championship game for the Parochial B title and an 18–8 record. A 5–0 win against Paul VI of Clifton in the 1978 championship game at Mercer County Park gave the team the Parochial A state title and a 15–7 record for the season. Down 1–0 after four innings, the 1982 team came back to win the Parochial B state championship with a 5–2 win against St. Mary of Elizabeth in the playoff finals at Mercer County Park to end the season with a 16–6 record. The 1997 team finished the season 30–3 after winning the Parochial A title with a 9–7 win against a Somerville team led by future Major Leaguer Jack Cust in the tournament final. In 2002, the baseball team won the Parochial South B title with a win over St. Rose High School, by a 3–1 final score, and became the Group B State Champions with a 5–1 win over Montclair Kimberley Academy. The team repeated the South B title in 2004 with 6–4 win over St. Rose, and repeated as Parochial group B champion with a 12–2 win over Newark Academy. The 2006 team won the South B sectional championship with a 7–3 win against Sacred Heart High School in the final game. The 2012 baseball team won the South Jersey Diamond Classic Championship. In 2015, the Crusaders captured their sixth Diamond Classic title, a tournament described as "the unofficial South Jersey championship", which ties them with Gloucester Catholic for most wins in South Jersey.

The football team won the Non-Public South B state sectional championships in 1974, 1978, 1980, 1986, 1987 and 1988. The 1980 team finished the season with an 8–2 record after winning the South Jersey Parochial B state title with a 7–0 defeat of St. Joseph High School in the championship game.

The girls field hockey team won the South Jersey Group I state sectional championship in 1977 and 1979, won the Parochial B South state sectional title in 1982, the Central Jersey Group I sectional title in 2006, won the Central Jersey Group II title in 2008, 2009, 2010 and 2012, and won the Non-Public South title in 2013 and 2015–2018. The team won the Parochial B title in 1982 (as co-champion with Phillipsburg Catholic High School) and 2016, and won the Group II state title in 2010 and 2012. The 1977 team finished the season with a 10–5–5 record after a scoreless tie in the Group II championship game against Chatham Township High School after regulation and two overtime periods.

The girls volleyball program started in fall of 2022, and won the National Division of the Olympic Conference in 2023, 2024, and 2025.

The boys wrestling team won the Parochial B South sectional title in 1980, 1981, 1982, 1987, 1988 and 1993, and won the Non-Public B sectional title in 2008 and 2009. The team won the Parochial B state title in 1988, and the Non-Public Group B title in 2008 and 2009. The Bishop Eustace 2007–08 wrestling team won their second state championship with a 55–24 win over Hudson Catholic Regional High School in the tournament final meet. The 2008–09 wrestling team repeated as state champions by an identical 55–24 score over Hudson Catholic, marking the program's third state title. With participation declining, the wrestling team was disbanded at the end of the 2014–15 school year.

The boys' cross country team won the Non-Public B state championship in 1982, 2002, 2010, 2011, 2016 and 2023.

The chess team won the New Jersey High School Team Championship in 1983 and 1984.

The girls' cross country team won the Group I state championship in 1988, 1989, won in Group II in 1990 and 1992, won in Non-Public B in 1994 and 2000, and won in Non-Public A in 1996. The program's six state championships are tied for ninth-most in the state and the program holds the longest streak statewide, with 10 consecutive titles won from 1977 to 1986.

The girls basketball team won the Non-Public Group B title in 1988 and 1989 vs. Immaculate Conception High School and in 2002 vs. Morris Catholic High School. The 2002 girls' basketball won the Parochial South B championship with a 47–37 win vs. St. Rose High School.

The softball team won the Non-Public B state championship in 1989 (defeating Phillipsburg Catholic High School in the finals of the playoffs), 1992 (vs. Morris Catholic High School), 1996 (vs. Mount Saint Dominic Academy), and won in Non-Public A in 1997 (vs. Immaculate Heart Academy) and 1998 (vs. Immaculate Heart). The program's five state titles are tied for eighth-most statewide. The 1998 team finished the season with a 27–2 record after winning the Parochial A state title with a 4–3 victory against Immaculate Heart to extend its winning streak to 18 games.

The girls track team won the indoor relay championship in Group II in 1995 and 1996, and the Group I title in 2005. The boys team won the Group II title in 1996 and 2003, in Group I in 2000 and in Non-Public B in 2017.

The girls spring track team was the Non-Public B state champion in 1995 and 1996, and in Non-Public A in 2003 and 2005.

The boys' soccer team won the 2001 Parochial South B title, topping St. Rose High School 3–0.

The girls soccer team won the Non-Public B state championship in 2002 (with a win in the tournament final against Newark Academy), 2004 (vs. Newark Academy), 2006 (vs. Eastern Christian High School) and 2008 (vs. Eastern Christian High School) and was Non-Public A co-champion in 2017 (with Immaculate Heart Academy). The program's five state titles are tied for tenth-most in the state. The girls' soccer team won the 2003 South Parochial B title by edging Holy Spirit High School 2–1 The team repeated for the South B state championship in 2004 with a 5–0 win over Holy Spirit. The team won the 2006 South B title with a 1–0 win vs. Gloucester Catholic High School. In 2007, the team won the South B state sectional championship with a 2–0 win over Holy Cross High School in the tournament final. In 2017 the team was Non-Public A co-champs tying 1–1 after double overtime with Immaculate Heart Academy in the finals.

The ice hockey team won the Handchen Cup in 2004 and 2005.

The girls field hockey team won the 2006 Central Jersey Group I state tournament with a 2–1 win over New Egypt High School.

The boys' swimming team won the 2007 Non-Public Group B championship with a 98–72 win over Pingry School.

In 2007, the boys' freshmen crew team was the first crew team to win the New Jersey state championships in Bishop Eustace School history. In 2007, 2008, and 2009, the Bishop Eustace Varsity Girls Crew won first place in the Stotesbury Cup Regatta's Varsity 8 category. In 2007, the Varsity 8 competed in the Henley Women's Regatta in England. In 2010, the Bishop Eustace Varsity 8 Boys Crew Team won the New Jersey Scholastic Championships.

The boys track team won the indoor track championship in Non-Public B in 2010 (as co-champion) and 2015–2019. The program is tied for 11th in state titles, with six.

== Notable alumni ==
- Brian Clarhaut (born 1986), soccer coach who coaches Nyköpings BIS in the Swedish Division 1
- Zac Gallen (born 1995), pitcher for the Arizona Diamondbacks
- Justin Hagenman (born 1996), pitcher for the New York Mets
- Kelli James (born 1970), United States Olympian field hockey striker who earned a total number of 144 caps for the women's national field hockey team
- Sara Keane (born 1991), footballer who played as goalkeeper for FC Kansas City
- Billy Lange (born 1972), former head men's basketball coach at the United States Naval Academy who started his coaching career at Bishop Eustace in 1995–96
- Bill Melchionni (born 1944) former 76ers and Nets basketball player
- Gary Melchionni (born 1951), former Phoenix Suns basketball player
- Tyler Miller (born 1993), professional soccer player who is starting Goalkeeper for Los Angeles FC in Major League Soccer
- Mike Moriarty (born 1974), former Major League infielder for the Baltimore Orioles
- Blaine Neal (born 1978) Major League Baseball relief pitcher with the St. Louis Cardinals and United States Olympic bronze medalist
- John Olive (born 1955), former San Diego Clippers basketball player
- Vinny Papale (born 1996), American football wide receiver
- Tyler Phillips (born 1997), pitcher for the Miami Marlins of Major League Baseball
- Cayden Primeau (born 1999), goaltender for the Chicago Wolves of the American Hockey League
- Dana Redd (born 1968, class of 1986), Mayor of Camden, New Jersey from 2010 to 2018
- Dennis L. Riley (1945–2023), politician who served in the New Jersey General Assembly, where he represented the 4th Legislative District from 1980 to 1990
- Jim Ryan (born 1957), former linebackers coach who played linebacker in the NFL for the Denver Broncos
- Katherine Shindle (born 1977), Miss America 1998
- Devin Smeltzer (born 1995), professional baseball pitcher for the Minnesota Twins
- Anthony Solometo (born 2002), professional baseball pitcher

== Notable faculty ==
- Don Casey (born 1937), former head coach of the Los Angeles Clippers and the New Jersey Nets who started his coaching career at Bishop Eustace
- Keith Primeau (born 1971), assistant hockey coach, who played 15 seasons in the NHL
