= Brandon Wagner =

Brandon Wagner may refer to:

- Brandon Wagner (racing driver)
- Brandon Wagner (baseball)
- Brandon Wagner (basketball)
