= Irvin Charles =

American football player (born 1997)

No. 85 – Seattle Seahawks
- Positions: Wide receiver, gunner
- Roster status: Active

Personal information
- Born: April 13, 1997 (age 29); Sicklerville, New Jersey, U.S.
- Listed height: 6 ft 4 in (1.93 m)
- Listed weight: 219 lb (99 kg)

Career information
- High school: Paul VI (Haddonfield, New Jersey)
- College: Penn State (2015–2017); Indiana (PA) (2021)
- NFL draft: 2022: undrafted

Career history
- New York Jets (2022–2025); Seattle Seahawks (2026–present)

Career NFL statistics as of Week 6, 2026
- Total tackles: 15
- Stats at Pro Football Reference

Irvin DeVonta "Irv" Charles (born April 13, 1997) is an American professional football wide receiver and gunner for the Seattle Seahawks of the National Football League (NFL). He played college football for the Penn State Nittany Lions and IUP Crimson Hawks. He previously played for the New York Jets.

== Early life ==
Charles grew up in Sicklerville, New Jersey, located about 23 miles away from Philadelphia. He and his father were Jets fans growing up, and Charles cites Brandon Marshall as an inspiration, wearing his number 15 while playing football at Paul VI High School. He was rated a four-star recruit by 247Sports.com.

College recruiting
Name	Hometown	School	Height	Weight	40^{‡}	Commit date
Irvin Charles; WR	Haddonfield, New Jersey	Paul VI	6 ft 4 in (1.93 m)	224 lb (102 kg)	4.50	Feb 4, 2015
Irvin Charles; WR	Recruit ratings: 247Sports: (79)					
Overall recruit ranking:
‡ Refers to 40-yard dash; Note: In many cases, Scout, Rivals, 247Sports, On3, and ESPN may conflict in their listings of height, weight and 40 time.; In these cases, the average was taken. ESPN grades are on a 100-point scale.; Sources: "2015 Team Ranking". Rivals.com.

== College career ==
Charles saw sporadic playing time for the Penn State Nittany Lions over the course of two seasons; he played primarily on special teams. He was kicked off the team for violating team rules prior to the team's game in the 2017 Fiesta Bowl. He transferred to Indiana University of Pennsylvania as a graduate transfer after finishing his degree at Penn State. He returned to football in 2021 and saw playing time at wide receiver, recording 39 catches for 792 yards along with 12 touchdowns.

=== College statistics ===
Season	Team	GP	Receiving					Tackles		
Season	Team	GP	Rec	Yds	Avg	Lng	TD	Cmb	Solo	Ast
2016	Penn State	13	2	106	53.0	80	1	5	5	0
2017	Penn State	11	1	4	4.0	4	0	7	5	2
2021	Indiana (PA)	9	39	792	20.3	85	12	3	2	1
Career		33	42	902	21.5	85	13	15	12	3

== Professional career ==
Pre-draft measurables
Height	Weight	Arm length	Hand span	Wingspan	40-yard dash	10-yard split	20-yard split	20-yard shuttle	Three-cone drill	Vertical jump	Broad jump	Bench press
6 ft 4 1/8 in (1.93 m)	228 lb (103 kg)	33 in (0.84 m)	9 1/2 in (0.24 m)	6 ft 8 1/4 in (2.04 m)	4.66 s	1.56 s	2.63 s	4.31 s	6.97 s	32.5 in (0.83 m)	10 ft 7 in (3.23 m)	19 reps
All values from Pro Day

=== New York Jets ===
On May 6, 2022, the New York Jets signed Charles to a three-year, $2.565 million contract as an undrafted free agent. On August 29, he was waived by the Jets. Two days later, Charles was re-signed to the team's practice squad.

On January 7, 2023, the Jets signed Charles to their active roster on a one-year, $705,000 contract. He made the team's final roster entering the regular season. Charles was waived on September 16 and was subsequently re-signed to the practice squad. He was promoted back to the active roster on October 11. Charles appeared in 12 games for the 2023 Jets, recording seven total tackles on special teams and receiving one target as a receiver with no catches.

Charles made the Jets’ roster for the 2024 season. He made two special teams tackles and blocked a punt from Ryan Stonehouse in a 24-17 win over the Tennessee Titans in the second game of the season. In Week 14, Charles sustained a season-ending ACL injury in the team's loss against the Miami Dolphins.

On March 28, 2025, Charles signed an exclusive rights tender with the Jets.

=== Seattle Seahawks ===
On May 27, 2026, Charles was traded to the Seattle Seahawks in exchange for a 2028 conditional seventh-round pick. He was placed on injured reserve on August 30, as he continued to recover from his ACL injury. He was activated off of injured reserve on October 13, but released the next day and re-signed to the practice squad. On October 23, he was signed onto the active roster.
