= Holy Family High School (Union City, New Jersey) =

Defunct Catholic high school in Hudson County, New Jersey, US

Holy Family High School was a private Roman Catholic college preparatory school in Union City, in Hudson County, in the U.S. state of New Jersey, United States. The school closed at the end of the 1971-72 school year.

== Athletics ==
The boys basketball team won the Non-Public B title in 1948 (defeating St. Mary's High School of South Amboy in the tournament final), and won the Non-Public C state title in 1955 (vs. Wildwood Catholic High School), 1956 (vs. Wildwood Catholic), 1962 (vs. St. Joseph High School of Hammonton), 1964 (vs. Wildwood Catholic), 1965 (vs. Wildwood Catholic). The 1965 team won the Parochial C state title with a 68-60 victory against Wildwood Catholic in the championship game. The 1955 team won the Class C state title with a 79-37 win against Wildwood Catholic in the playoff finals at the Elizabeth Armory. The 1956 team won the Catholic C state title with a 56-48 win against Wildwood Catholic in the championship game played at Rutgers University.

== Notable alumni ==
- Hank Finkel (born 1942), former professional basketball player
