= J. D. DiRenzo =

American football player (born 1998)

No. 54 – Louisville Kings
- Position: Offensive tackle
- Roster status: Active

Personal information
- Born: July 27, 1998 (age 28); Hammonton, New Jersey, U.S.
- Listed height: 6 ft 5 in (1.96 m)
- Listed weight: 310 lb (141 kg)

Career information
- High school: St. Joseph Academy (NJ)
- College: Sacred Heart (2017–2021); Rutgers (2022)
- NFL draft: 2023: undrafted

Career history
- Carolina Panthers (2023–2024); Arlington Renegades (2025); Louisville Kings (2026–present)

Awards and highlights
- UFL champion (2026)

Career NFL statistics as of 2023
- Games played: 3
- Stats at Pro Football Reference

J. D. DiRenzo (born July 27, 1998) is an American football offensive tackle for the Louisville Kings of the United Football League (UFL). He played college football for the Sacred Heart Pioneers and Rutgers Scarlet Knights and was signed by the Panthers as an undrafted free agent in 2023.

== Early life ==
DiRenzo was born on July 27, 1998, in Hammonton, New Jersey. His grandfather, Dan DiRenzo, was reportedly a member of the Philadelphia Eagles during their 1948 and 1949 championship run. He attended St. Joseph Academy and helped them win state championships in 2013, 2014 and 2015 while being a four-year letterman; he was selected third-team all-state and was first-team All-South Jersey and first-team all-conference in his senior year.

== College career ==
DiRenzo began his collegiate career with the Sacred Heart Pioneers, appearing in no games as a true freshman in 2017. He then became a starter in 2018, starting all 11 games while helping the Pioneers have the best rushing offense in the conference. Having been a right tackle in 2018, he shifted to left tackle in 2019 and started all 12 games while being named first-team All-Northeast Conference (NEC).

In the spring 2021 season, postponed from 2020 due to the COVID-19 pandemic, DiRenzo started all five games and was named first-team All-American by the American Football Coaches Association (AFCA), first-team all-conference and All-New England as he helped Sacred Heart reach the FCS playoffs while winning the NEC championship. He was a third-team All-American in 2021 while starting all 12 games at left tackle, additionally being chosen first-team All-NEC and All-New England.

After having started 40 games for Sacred Heart, DiRenzo entered the NCAA transfer portal and transferred to play for the Rutgers Scarlet Knights in 2022, using a final year of eligibility granted to him due to the COVID-19 pandemic. He started all 12 games – nine at left guard and three at left tackle – and was named the team's offensive most valuable player. He was invited to the Hula Bowl after the season.

== Professional career ==
Pre-draft measurables
Height	Weight	Arm length	Hand span	Wingspan	40-yard dash	10-yard split	20-yard split	20-yard shuttle	Three-cone drill	Vertical jump	Broad jump
6 ft 4 5/8 in (1.95 m)	306 lb (139 kg)	32 5/8 in (0.83 m)	10 1/8 in (0.26 m)	6 ft 7 1/4 in (2.01 m)	5.31 s	1.84 s	2.88 s	4.69 s	7.45 s	33.5 in (0.85 m)	9 ft 2 in (2.79 m)
All values from Pro Day

=== Carolina Panthers ===
DiRenzo was not invited to the NFL Scouting Combine and was not selected in the 2023 NFL draft, but was signed by the Carolina Panthers as an undrafted free agent. He appeared on 102 snaps in preseason but was released at the final roster cuts, then re-signed to the practice squad. He was elevated to the active roster for the team's Week 15 game against the Atlanta Falcons, and made his NFL debut in the 9–7 win, playing seven total snaps. DiRenzo was signed to the active roster on January 2, 2024. He finished the season having appeared in three games.

On August 6, 2024, DiRenzo was waived with an injury designation.

=== Memphis Showboats ===
On February 14, 2025, DiRenzo signed with the Memphis Showboats of the United Football League (UFL).

=== Arlington Renegades ===
On April 21, 2025, DiRenzo was traded to the Arlington Renegades in exchange for OT Kellen Diesch.

=== Louisville Kings ===
On January 13, 2026, DiRenzo was selected by the Louisville Kings in the 2026 UFL Draft.
