= Ann Morhauser =

American glass artist (born 1957)

- Born: 1957 (age 68–69); Camden, New Jersey, U.S.
- Education: California College of the Arts
- Known for: Handmade glass art
- Website: annieglass.com

Ann Morhauser (also known as Annie Morhauser, born 1957) is an American glass artist based in California. She is the founder of Annieglass, a glassware, tableware and glass sculpture company. Her work is held in the permanent collection of the Smithsonian American Art Museum. In 2022, she was recognized as the Santa Cruz County Artist of the Year.

== Early life and education ==
Morhauser was born in Camden, New Jersey. Raised in Collingswood, New Jersey, She attended Paul VI High School. She studied glassmaking and graduated from California College of the Arts in 1979.

== Career ==
=== Artistic work ===
After graduation, Morhauser started her career making and selling glass plates at craft fairs and museum shops. Later, she worked in a glass gallery in California.

Morhauser started Annieglass, a glassware, tableware and glass sculpture company in 1983 in Santa Cruz, California, and then moved her headquarters to Watsonville in 1996. She hand-crafts her pieces and utilizes a technique called slumped glass to mold the pieces. She applies gold, color, or platinum to glass and fires it in a ceramic kiln over a ceramic mold. The heat and gravity make the precious metals or color fuse to the glass as well as making the glass slump into the mold. She has received a patent and FDA approval for this technique. She also has a technique to fuse recycled glass together and shape it with a waterjet, for which she has applied for a patent.

Some of her pieces have also displayed at the Corning Museum of Glass in New York

=== Public collections ===
Morhauser’s artworks are a part of the Luce Foundation Collection of American Craft, an exhibit assembled for the study of American folk artists and contemporary craft, at the Smithsonian American Art Museum.

== Awards ==
In 2022, Morhauser was recognized as the Artist of the Year by the Santa Cruz County Arts Commission.
