= Anthony Gargiulo =

American gridiron football player (born 1984)

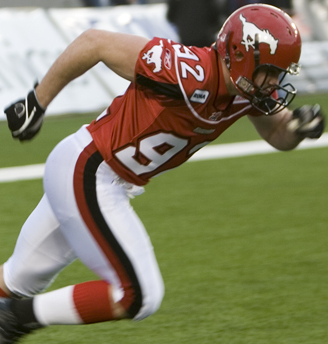
- Gargiulo with the Calgary Stampeders in 2007

Profile
- Position: Defensive end

Personal information
- Born: November 20, 1984 (age 41)
- Listed height: 6 ft 3 in (1.91 m)
- Listed weight: 235 lb (107 kg)

Career information
- High school: Immaculata (Somerville, New Jersey)
- College: Dartmouth

Career history
- 2007–2008: Calgary Stampeders

Awards and highlights
- 2× All-Ivy League (2004, 2005)

Career statistics
- Tackles: 21
- Sacks: 5

Anthony Gargiulo (born November 20, 1984) is an American former professional football defensive end who played for the Calgary Stampeders of the Canadian Football League (CFL). He played college football at Dartmouth.

== Early life ==
Gargiulo grew up in the Neshanic Station section of Branchburg, New Jersey and attended Immaculata High School in Somerville, New Jersey, where he played football and lacrosse. He was named first team All-Skyland Conference and second team All-State in football as a senior.

== College career ==
Gargiulo was a member of the Dartmouth Big Green for four seasons. Gargiulo began to see significant playing time as a sophomore and was named honorable mention All-Ivy League after recording five sacks. He was named first team All-Ivy after leading the conference with twelve sacks and the team with 14 tackles for loss. Gargiulo was named first team All-Ivy again as a senior after recording 58 tackles, 21 tackles for a loss, and eight sacks with one fumble recovery and one forced fumble. Gargiulo finished his collegiate career with a school record 25 sacks.

After his senior season, Gargiulo joined the Dartmouth Rugby team and was a member of the club's 2006 Ivy Rugby Conference squad.

== Professional career ==
Gargiulo was signed by the Calgary Stampeders of the Canadian Football League on Ma7 15, 2007. He finished his rookie season with 21 tackles, five sacks and one fumble recovery in 10 games played before breaking and tearing ligaments and tendons in his leg on an illegal block against the BC Lions on November 3, 2007. Gargiulo temporarily retired in 2008 due to his injury. He later returned from retirement and was signed to the Stampeders' practice roster on July 14, 2008. Gargiulo was released two weeks later on July 29, 2008.
