= Serena Bocchino =

American artist (born 1960)

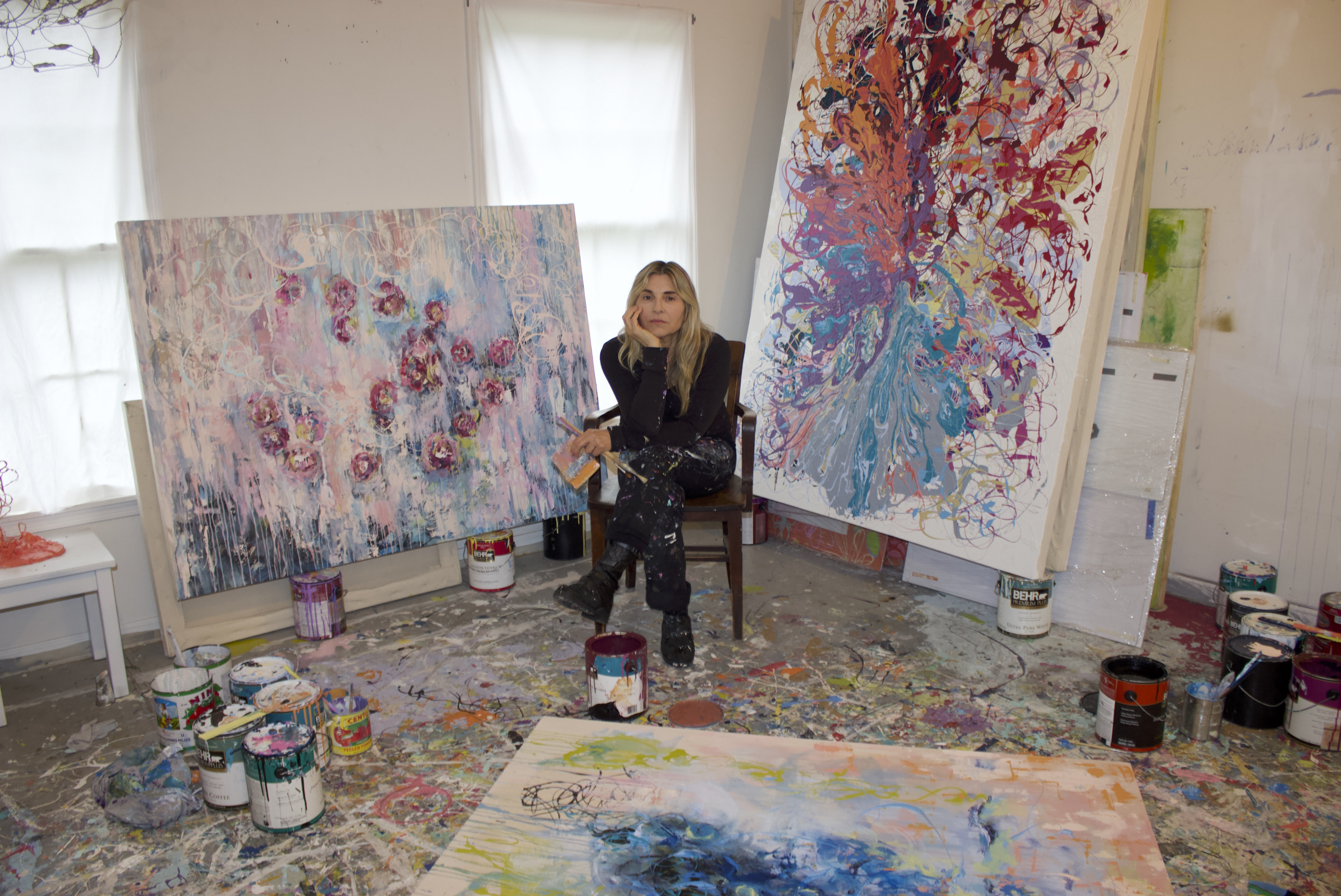
- Bocchino in her studio, July 2020
- Born: March 22, 1960 (age 66); Englewood, New Jersey, U.S.
- Occupation: Artist

Serena Bocchino (born March 22, 1960) is an American contemporary abstract artist working primarily in the realm of painting. Her highly expressionistic style shows a variety of influences from Abstract Expressionism and dance, to Fluxus and jazz music. Like her varied influences, her process is highly improvisational yet technically informed – consisting of language created through an intermingled vocabulary of color, media and technique.

== Early life and education ==
Bocchino was born in Englewood, New Jersey, a suburb of New York City. She is one of six children. Her mother, Lucia Confalone Bocchino, was an artist and attended the Cooper Union College on a full scholarship, later working as an art director at Condé Nast Publications. Surrounded by music and art in a lively household, like her mother, Bocchino was drawn to the arts. She graduated from Immaculate Heart Academy in 1978 and enrolled at Fairleigh Dickinson University in Teaneck, New Jersey, receiving a bachelor of arts degree with honors. There she studied with Polish colorist, Wojciech Fangor who later in his career moved toward abstraction. Attending New York University in the 1980's where she earned her Master of Arts, the university's proximity to the East Village exposed Bocchino to a fertile vortex of influences that shaped a generation of young artists like her who came of age surrounded by the rough street aesthetics of graffiti, collage and assemblage playing out against the backdrop of the punk, new wave and underground club scenes and that intertwined with film, art and music sub-cultures. Bocchino was mentored by a number of professors while studying at NYU. Among the art faculty, she was particularly encouraged and influenced by; John Kacere, who pioneered abstract painting before becoming more well-known as a photo-realist, expressionist painter Idelle Weber who associated with AbEx, Pop and Neo-Dada artists such as Jasper Johns, Roy Lichtenstein, Andy Warhol, and James Rosenquist, and painter Robert Kaupelis, who authored the ground-breaking book "Experimental Drawing" and member of the James Gallery, part of the 10th Street galleries cooperative.

== Career ==
While still a student at NYU, Bocchino became a studio assistant to painter Susan Rothenberg, whose symbolic figurative works were full of color and movement. Teetering along the divide between symbolism and abstraction while exploring the formal properties of paint, Rothenberg's interest in texture and luminosity - along with dance and movement, begin to impact Bocchino's artistic language. Bocchino's association with Rothenbergn lasted through the late 1980's. During this time Bocchino was also studio assistant to painter/printmaker Pat Steir, whose abstract "Waterfall" paintings included techniques such as dripping, splashing and pouring paint. These energetic properties seem to have resonated with the young painter whose unconventional approach to painting seems indelibly influenced by such techniques. In 1986 Susan Rothenberg selected Bocchino for the "4X4 Artists Choose Artists" exhibition at the Jus de Pomme Gallery, her first official show in the East Village scene of her mentors and idols. By 1987, Bocchino was selected for a residency at PS1MoMA (then PS1) which led to a meeting with Italian Vice-Prime Minister Gianni DeMichelis who invited her to show in a solo exhibition in Rome. These early successes positioned Bocchino for a series of increasingly high profile shows and television spots. Bocchino's work is in a number of important museum and private collections and she has numerous solo exhibitions at commercial galleries and museums. Today, Bocchino's artistic investigations are increasingly concerned with color, space and gesture. Critic John Eischeid astutely articulated the relationship of her work to jazz music "lines come and go, sometimes picking up where another left off, sometimes not. By working with such pure abstraction, (Bocchino) elegantly and intuitively reveals this structural similarity between music and painting." In this same review, Eischeid also invokes comparisons to artists Jackson Pollock, Agnes Martin and Joan Mitchell for the way the use they use abstraction as a language which is similar in structure to jazz music.

== Selected Awards and Recognitions ==
- International Invitational Exhibition - Czong Institute for Contemporary Art (CICA), Gyeonggi-do, Korea, 2020
- Public Art Commission - Newark Penn Station, New Jersey Transit, 2019
- Residency - The ESKFF Foundation at Mana Contemporary, Jersey City, NJ, 2017
- Public Art/Site Specific Installation - Central Academy of Fine Arts Museum, Beijing, China, 2017
- Residency - The Brodsky Center for Innovative Print and Paper, Rutgers University, New Brunswick, NJ, 2002
- Grant - New Jersey State Council on the Arts - Artist in Education, Trenton, NJ, 1994
- Grant - Artists' Space, New York, NY, 1990
- Grant - Pollock-Krasner Foundation, New York, NY, 1989
- Residency - PS1 Museum, Queens, NY, 1987

== Collections ==
- Art In Embassies, Washington D.C.
- The Brodsky Center, Philadelphia, PA
- The Bronx Museum of the Arts, Bronx, NY
- Central Academy of Fine Arts Museum, Beijing, China
- Czong Institute for Contemporary Art, South Korea
- Islip Art Museum, East Islip, NY
- Lotus Art Museum, Beijing, China
- Montclair Art Museum, Montclair, NJ
- Museo Italo Americano, San Francisco, CA
- National Gallery of Art, Washington D.C.
- National Museum of Poland
- The Newark Museum of Art, Newark, NJ
- Nicolaysen Art Museum, Casper, WY
- Springfield Museum of Art, Springfield, OH
- St. Louis Museum of Art, MO
- New Jersey State Museum, Trenton, NJ
- Zimmerli Art Museum, New Brunswick, NJ
