= Immaculate Conception High School (Lodi, New Jersey) =

Catholic high school in Bergen County, New Jersey, US

Location
- 258 South Main Street; Lodi, (Bergen County), New Jersey 07644; United States
- 40°51′58″N 74°5′38″W

Information
- Type: Private, All-Female
- Religious affiliation: Roman Catholic
- Established: 1915
- Status: closed
- Closed: 2023
- School district: Archdiocese of Newark
- NCES School ID: 00862642
- Head of school: Jessica Cutrona
- Faculty: 17.8 FTEs
- Grades: 9–12
- Enrollment: 145 (as of 2019–20)
- Student to teacher ratio: 8.1:1
- Colors: Blue and white
- Athletics conference: North Jersey Interscholastic Conference
- Sports: Softball, Basketball, Volleyball, Cheerleading, Tennis, Swimming, Track and Field, Soccer
- Mascot: Wolf
- Nickname: Blue Wolves
- Accreditation: Middle States Association of Colleges and Schools
- Yearbook: The Felician
- Tuition: $14,330 (2021-22)
- Website: www.ichslodi.org

Immaculate Conception High School (ICHS) was an American private, Roman Catholic, all-girls college-preparatory high school located in Lodi, in Bergen County, in the U.S. state of New Jersey. The school operated under the jurisdiction of the Roman Catholic Archdiocese of Newark. The school was founded in 1915 by the Felician Sisters and closed at the end of the 2022-23 school year. ICHS was accredited by the Middle States Association of Colleges and Schools Commission on Elementary and Secondary Schools from 1961 until its closure in 2023.

As of the 2019–20 school year, the school had an enrollment of 145 students and 17.8 classroom teachers (on an FTE basis), for a student–teacher ratio of 8.1:1. The school's student body was 62.1% (90) White, 26.2% (38) Hispanic, 10.3% (15) Black and 1.4% (2) Asian. The average class size was 15 students. The administration, faculty and staff consisted of three Felician Sisters, 19 women, and 8 men. About 98% of seniors pursued higher education.

== History ==
Established in 1915, the state approved the school in November 1923 to operate as a secondary school. Constructed at the cost of $1 million (equivalent to $11.5 million in 2025), Newark Diocese Archbishop Thomas Aloysius Boland officiated at ceremonies in September 1957 dedicating the new school, which had a student body of 500, including an incoming ninth-grade class of nearly 150.

In March 2023, after 107 years of the school running, the Board of Directors announced Immaculate Conception's closure as of June 30, 2023.

== Athletics ==
The Immaculate Conception High School Blue Wolves participated in the North Jersey Interscholastic Conference, which comprises small-enrollment schools in Bergen, Hudson County, Morris County and Passaic County counties, and was created following a reorganization of sports leagues in Northern New Jersey by the New Jersey State Interscholastic Athletic Association (NJSIAA). Before league realignment in the fall of 2010, Immaculate Conception was part of the smaller Bergen-Passaic Scholastic League (BPSL). With 320 students in grades 10-12, the school was classified by the NJSIAA for the 2019–20 school year as Non-Public B for most athletic competition purposes, which included schools with an enrollment of 37 to 366 students in that grade range (equivalent to Group I for public schools).

Sports offered included soccer, volleyball, tennis, cross country, basketball, softball, cheerleading, swimming and track.

Athletic accomplishments:

- 2004 Bowling Team: State Tournament Non-Public B sectionals
- 2005-06 Basketball Team: 2nd Place BPSL Carpenter, County Tournament, State Tournament Non-Public B semifinalist
- 2006 Softball Team: 2nd Place BPSL Carpenter, County Tournament, State Tournament Non-Public B semifinalist
- 2006-07 Basketball Team: 1st Place BPSL Carpenter, County Tournament, State Tournament Non-Public B finalist

=== Softball ===
The team won the Non-Public B state championship each year from 2013 to 2019. The seven consecutive titles are the longest streak in the state and the seven state titles are tied for fifth among all programs in New Jersey.

The softball team won its first state championship in 2013, defeating Sacred Heart High School by a score of 6–4 in the tournament final; Sacred Heart had defeated Immaculate Conception by a 3–1 score in the finals the previous season and was playing its final softball game before the school's closure at the end of the 2012–13 school year.

The team repeated as Non-Public B champion in 2014, with a 5–0 win against St. Joseph High School (Hammonton) in the final game of the tournament, finishing with a 27–2 record for the season.

The team won their third consecutive title in 2015 with a 2–1 win in a rematch against St. Joseph, coming from behind to win the tournament final by scoring one run in the bottom of the sixth inning and a walk-off run on a single with one out in the seventh, finishing the season with a 22–5 record.

In a game that marked Jeff Horohonich's 600th career victory as a coach, the team won its fourth title with a 3–0 win against Benedictine Academy in the 2016 final, to finish the season with a 20–9 record and become the third program to win four straight group titles.

In 2017, the softball team won the Non-Public B championship, defeating Wildwood Catholic High School by a score of 8–2 in the tournament final; the win was the program's fifth consecutive Non-Public B title, setting a state record for consecutive softball state group championships. The team advanced to the inaugural New Jersey State Interscholastic Athletic Association softball Tournament of Champions and made it to the final, where the team lost by a score of 7–6 in extra innings against Immaculate Heart Academy in the tournament final.

In 2018, after winning the program's sixth consecutive Non-Public B title with a 3-0 win against Wildwood Catholic, the team came into the state Tournament of Champions as the sixth and lowest seeded, and won the quarterfinals against third-seed North Hunterdon High School by a score 5-3 and second-seed Robbinsville High School in the semis by 12-2 before losing in the finals by a score of 9–0 to fourth-seed Steinert High School.

The team won its seventh straight Non-Public B state championship in 2019 with a 4-0 win against St. Joseph High School (Hammonton) in the playoff finals.

== Notable alumni ==
- Rachel Zegler (born 2001, class of 2019), actress starring in Steven Spielberg's film adaptation of West Side Story.
