= St. Aloysius High School (Jersey City, New Jersey) =

Defunct Catholic high school in Jersey City, New Jersey, United States

Location
- 721 West Side Avenue; Jersey City, Hudson County, New Jersey 07304; United States; 40.725124°N 74.0776027°W

Information
- Type: Private, coed
- Religious affiliation: Roman Catholic
- Founded: 1897
- Status: Closed
- Closed: 2007
- Grades: 9-12
- Team name: Cardinals

The St. Aloysius High School was a private co-ed high school located in Jersey City, in Hudson County, in the U.S. state of New Jersey, operated by the Roman Catholic Archdiocese of Newark.

The school closed at the end of the 2006-07 school year. The school, which first opened in 1897, had faced an annual deficit of $500,000 and would have had to raise tuition by more than 25% to remain in fiscal balance.

== Athletics ==
The St. Aloysius High School Cardinals competed in the Hudson County Interscholastic Athletic Association (HCIAA), which includes public and private high schools in Hudson County. The league operates under the supervision of the New Jersey State Interscholastic Athletic Association (NJSIAA).

The spring / outdoor track team won the Non-Public A state title in 1954, 1956 and 1958.

The boys basketball team won the NJSIAA Non-Public B state championship in 1956 (defeating St. Rose High School in the tournament final), 1958 (vs. Gloucester Catholic High School) and 1959 (vs. Gloucester Catholic). The 1956 team won the Catholic B state title with a 78-63 win against St. Rose in the championship game played at Rutgers University.

The boys cross country running team won the Non-Public A state title in 1959.

The boys soccer team won the Non-Public C state title in 1974 and 1975, defeating runner-up St. Cecilia High School both years.
