= Max Valles =

American football player (born 1994)

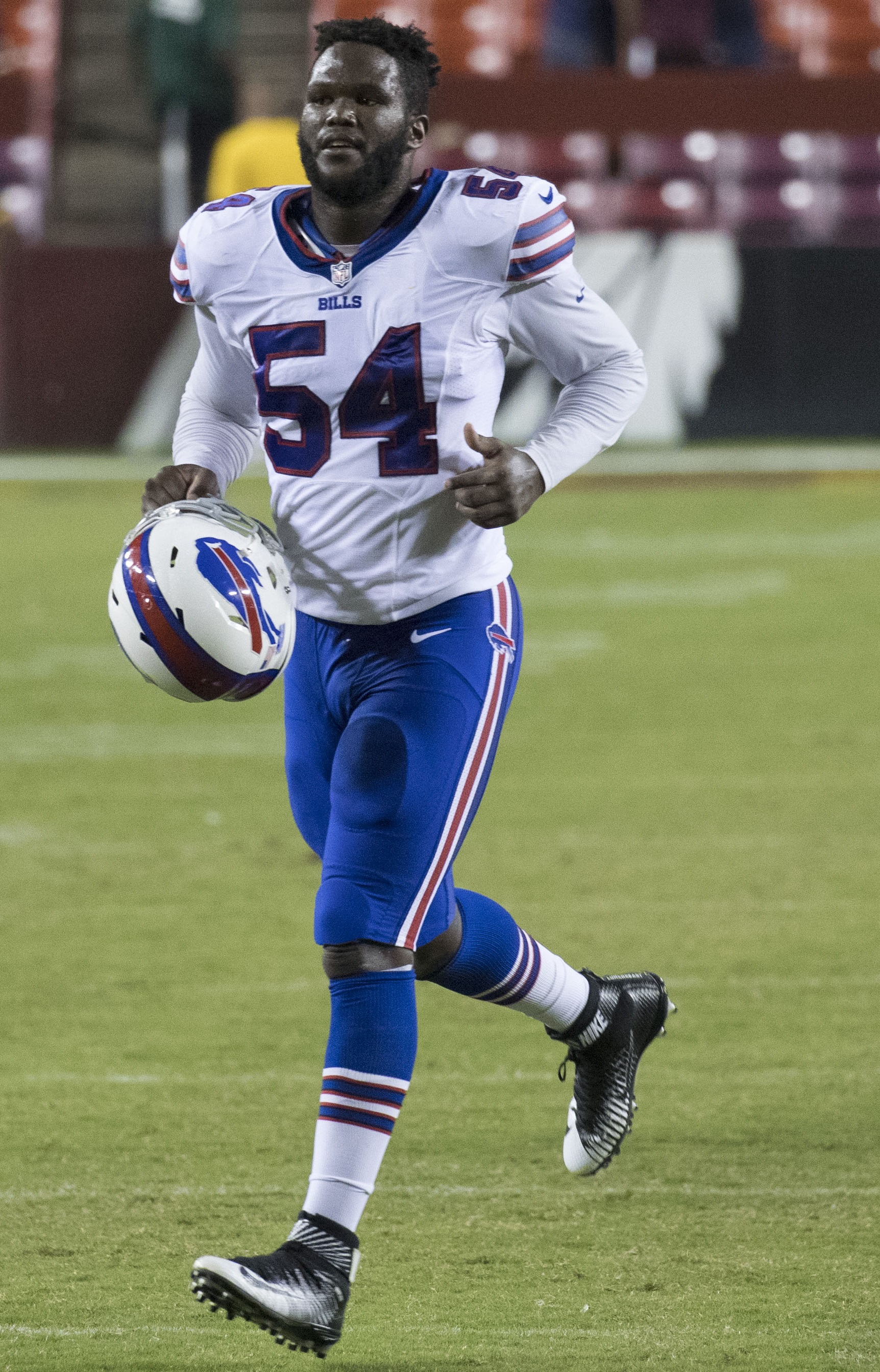
- Valles with the Buffalo Bills in 2016

No. 54, 90
- Position: Linebacker

Personal information
- Born: August 5, 1994 (age 32); Sicklerville, New Jersey, U.S.
- Listed height: 6 ft 5 in (1.96 m)
- Listed weight: 240 lb (109 kg)

Career information
- High school: Hammonton (NJ) St. Joseph
- College: Virginia
- NFL draft: 2015: 6th round, 179th overall pick

Career history
- Oakland Raiders (2015)*; Buffalo Bills (2015–2017); Oakland Raiders (2017)*; Ottawa Redblacks (2019)*
- * Offseason or practice squad member only
- Stats at Pro Football Reference

Max Valles (born August 5, 1994) is an American former football linebacker. He played college football at Virginia. He was selected by the Oakland Raiders in the sixth round of the 2015 NFL draft.

== Early life ==
Valles grew up in the Sicklerville section of Winslow Township, New Jersey and played high school football at St. Joseph High School in Hammonton, New Jersey, where he played wide receiver, defensive end and safety. Valles committed to the University of Virginia to play college football. He also played baseball in high school. After high school, he attended Fork Union Military Academy for a year.

== College career ==
Valles attended Virginia from 2013 to 2014. As a freshman in 2013, he played in 10 games, making four starts. He had 23 tackles and four sacks. Valles started all 12 games as a sophomore in 2014. He finished the year with 55 tackles and nine sacks.

After his redshirt sophomore season, Valles entered the 2015 NFL draft.

== Professional career ==
=== Oakland Raiders (first stint) ===
Valles was selected with the 179th overall pick of the 2015 NFL draft by the Oakland Raiders, who announced he would play defensive end. On September 5, 2015, he was waived by the Raiders and was re-signed to the practice squad.

=== Buffalo Bills ===
On December 16, 2015, the Buffalo Bills signed Valles off the Raiders' practice squad.

On September 2, 2016, he was released by the Bills as part of final roster cuts and was re-signed to the practice squad. He signed a reserve/future contract with the Bills on January 2, 2017.

On September 2, 2017, Valles was waived by the Bills.

=== Oakland Raiders (second stint) ===
Valles was signed to the Raiders' practice squad on September 3 and was released on September 8, 2017. He was re-signed on September 12, 2017. He was released on September 28, 2017.

=== Ottawa Redblacks ===
On May 21, 2019, Valles signed with the Ottawa Redblacks of the Canadian Football League.

== Personal life ==
His older brother, Hakeem, also played in the NFL.
