= Henry Finkel =

American basketball player (born 1942)

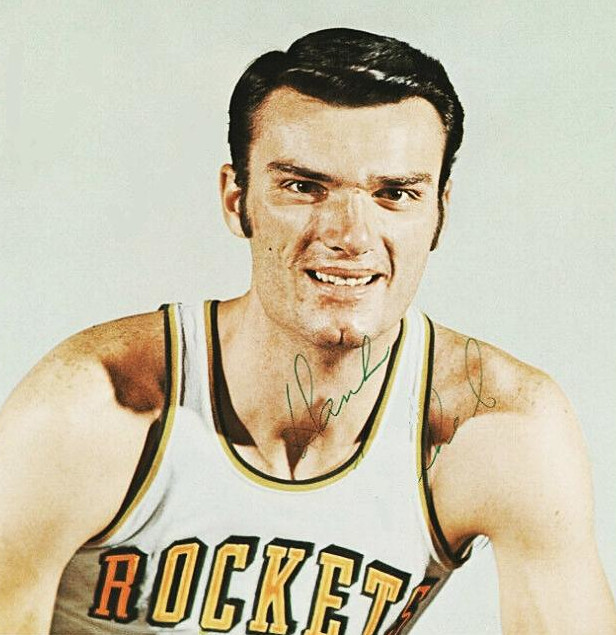
- Finkel, circa 1969

Personal information
- Born: April 20, 1942 (age 84) Union City, New Jersey, U.S.
- Listed height: 7 ft 0 in (2.13 m)
- Listed weight: 240 lb (109 kg)

Career information
- High school: Holy Family (Union City, New Jersey)
- College: Dayton (1963–1966)
- NBA draft: 1966: 2nd round, 17th overall pick
- Drafted by: Los Angeles Lakers
- Playing career: 1966–1975
- Position: Center
- Number: 15, 17, 29

Career history
- 1966–1967: Los Angeles Lakers
- 1967–1969: San Diego Rockets
- 1969–1975: Boston Celtics

Career highlights
- NBA champion (1974); Third-team All-American – AP, NABC, UPI (1966)

Career statistics
- Points: 2,790 (5.1 ppg)
- Rebounds: 2,151 (3.9 rpg)
- Assists: 426 (0.8 apg)
- Stats at NBA.com
- Stats at Basketball Reference

Henry J. Finkel (born April 20, 1942) is an American basketball player whose professional career lasted from 1966 to 1975. Selected by the Los Angeles Lakers in second round of the 1966 NBA draft he remained with the team through 1966–67, then played with the San Diego Rockets from 1967 to 1969 and spent the remaining years with the Boston Celtics, when, during his next to last season, the Celtics won the 1974 NBA Championship.

== Early life ==
Finkel was born in Union City, New Jersey and attended Holy Family High School. He enrolled at nearby Saint Peter's University in Jersey City, New Jersey, but dropped out and worked as a sandblaster in a shipyard after his father died of cancer. He was spotted at a Dairy Queen out with some friends by Harry Brooks, who had seen Finkel play in high school. Brooks was a "bird dog" (an independent scout) for the University of Dayton, which had just won the 1962 National Invitation Tournament (NIT) in Madison Square Garden. Soon, Finkel enrolled at Dayton.

== College career ==
A 6'11" center (at times listed as 7'0"), Finkel attended Dayton to play for Tom Blackburn, Dayton's coach since 1947. Finkel redshirted his first year, and eligibility-wise was a sophomore the following year. As a sophomore in 1963–64, Finkel averaged 23.0 points and 13 rebounds per game as the Flyers had a record of 15–10. However, Blackburn, who had been battling cancer, died eight days after the Flyers' final game of the season. Assistant coach Don Donoher was then named head coach.

As a junior, Finkel averaged 25.3 points and 14.9 rebounds for the 22–7 Flyers.

As a senior in 1965–66, he averaged 22.7 points and 12.1 rebounds per game as the Flyers were 23–6. On December 30, 1965, he had a career-high 44 points against the University of Maryland. He was named All-American by the Helms Foundation. He was co-MVP of the team in 1963–64 and the outright winner in 1964–65 and 1965–66.

He led the Flyers to the NCAA tournament's Sweet Sixteen in both his junior and senior seasons, with the Flyers eventually losing to the #1-ranked team both years.

He remains the third-leading scorer in UD history with 1,968 points, behind only 1965–66 teammate Don May and four-year player Roosevelt Chapman. He holds the Dayton record for scoring average in a single season (25.3 as a junior) and career (23.7). His career field goal percentage of .619 is third all-time and first among players with 500 or more field goals made.

He received a bachelor's degree in Education. In 1974 he was inducted into the University of Dayton Hall of Fame.

Due to Finkel's age (22), after his sophomore year he was eligible for the 1964 NBA draft and was chosen in the fourth round by the Los Angeles Lakers, but he chose to remain in school. He was selected again in the 1965 NBA draft, again in the fourth round, by the Philadelphia 76ers, but he returned to Dayton for his senior year.

== NBA career ==
Finkel was drafted in the second round (17th overall) in the 1966 NBA draft by the Los Angeles Lakers. In his first year, he played sparingly—in 27 games he averaged 5.2 minutes, 1.5 points and 2.4 rebounds per game, mostly as a backup to center Darrall Imhoff.

On May 1, 1967, he was drafted by the San Diego Rockets in the NBA expansion draft. His playing time and production greatly increased from his rookie year. In 53 games, he averaged 21.1 minutes, a career-high 11.6 points, 7.1 rebounds, and a career-high 1.4 assists per game. He also had a career-best .492 field goal percentage.

During the season, he set personal single-game highs of 21 points, then 24, and finally 26 on March 6, 1968. One night later, on March 7, he exploded for 42 points against the Lakers as he made 13 field goals and was 16-for-18 from the free throw line. His scoring barrage continued the following night with another 35 against the Lakers.

The following season, his third in the NBA, his playing time dipped again. In 35 games he averaged 9.5 minutes, 3.7 points and 3.1 rebounds.

On August 22, 1969, Finkel was traded to the defending NBA champion Boston Celtics, coached by future Hall-of-Famer Bill Russell. Russell had been player-coach for the Celtics' championship season, but he stepped away from both roles after the season.

With Russell no longer playing and the Celtics' roster aging, in 1969–70 the perennial NBA champion's record fell to an uncharacteristic 34–48 under new coach Tom Heinsohn; who, just like Finkel, grew up in Union City, New Jersey. Although Finkel had one of his best seasons statistically, he took criticism from Celtics fans who were missing Russell as the team was rebuilding. With career highs in games (80) and minutes per game (23.3, seventh on the team), Finkel averaged 9.7 points and a career-best 7.7 rebounds per game.

In 1970–71, help arrived as the Celtics drafted future hall-of-famer Dave Cowens. In 15.4 minutes per game backing up Cowens, Finkel averaged 6.5 points and 4.3 rebounds per game in 80 games as the Celtics again found their winning ways with a 44–38 record.

In 1971–72, his sixth in the NBA, in 78 games his minutes dropped to 9.4 per game with averages of 3.2 points and 3.2 rebounds per game. He played three more seasons with the Celtics, averaging about seven minutes per game and just over two points and two rebounds per game.

In 1973–74, he won an NBA championship ring as the Celtics defeated the Milwaukee Bucks four games to three in the NBA Finals. Finkel played in all seven games, totalling 17 points and 10 rebounds.

In November 1975, the Celtics released Finkel, ending his NBA career. Finkel averaged 5.1 points per game and 3.9 rebounds per game in his nine-year career.

== Personal life ==
After his playing days ended, Finkel remained in the Boston area, where he was a broadcaster for the Celtics and for SportsChannel, and later he was an advance scout for the Cleveland Cavaliers. He established his own office furniture company, Hank Finkel Associates, in Woburn, Massachusetts. He resides in nearby Lynnfield.

== Career statistics ==
Legend
GP	Games played	GS	Games started	MPG	Minutes per game
FG%	Field goal percentage	3P%	3-point field goal percentage	FT%	Free throw percentage
RPG	Rebounds per game	APG	Assists per game	SPG	Steals per game
BPG	Blocks per game	PPG	Points per game	**Bold**	Career high

=== NBA ===
==== Regular season ====
Year	Team	GP	MPG	FG%	FT%	RPG	APG	STL	BLK	PPG
1966–67	L.A. Lakers	27	5.2	.362	.583	2.4	.2			1.5
1967–68	San Diego	53	21.1	**.492**	.686	7.1	**1.4**			**11.6**
1968–69	San Diego	35	9.5	.441	**.756**	3.1	.6			3.7
1969–70	Boston	**80**	**23.3**	.454	.670	**7.7**	1.3			9.7
1970–71	Boston	**80**	15.4	.438	.732	4.3	1.0			6.5
1971–72	Boston	78	9.4	.406	.581	3.2	.8			3.2
1972–73	Boston	76	6.5	.451	.538	2.0	.3			2.4
1973–74†	Boston	60	7.1	.462	.651	2.3	.5	**.1**	**.1**	2.5
1974–75	Boston	62	8.4	.403	.535	1.8	.5	**.1**	.0	2.0
Career		551	12.5	.449	.662	3.9	.8	.1	.1	5.1

==== Playoffs ====
Year	Team	GP	MPG	FG%	FT%	RPG	APG	SPG	BPG	PPG
1967	L.A. Lakers	1	1.0	–	–	.0	.0			.0
1969	San Diego	2	6.0	.000	–	**3.5**	.0			.0
1972	Boston	**8**	**8.5**	.455	–	3.0	.4			**2.5**
1973	Boston	7	3.3	**.667**	–	.9	.4			1.7
1974†	Boston	**8**	5.8	.444	**1.000**	1.3	.4	**.1**	.0	2.1
1975	Boston	7	3.6	.429	.600	.9	**.6**	.0	.0	1.3
Career		33	5.3	.458	.667	1.6	.4	.1	.0	1.8
