= Jim Ryan (linebacker) =

American football player and coach (born 1957)

No. 50
- Position: Linebacker

Personal information
- Born: May 18, 1957 (age 69); Bellmawr, New Jersey, U.S.
- Listed height: 6 ft 1 in (1.85 m)
- Listed weight: 220 lb (100 kg)

Career information
- High school: Bishop Eustace (Pennsauken Township, New Jersey)
- College: William & Mary
- NFL draft: 1979: undrafted

Career history
- Denver Broncos (1979–1988)

Career NFL statistics
- Sacks: 10
- Fumble recoveries: 7
- Interceptions: 5
- Stats at Pro Football Reference

James Joseph Ryan (born May 18, 1957) is an American former linebackers coach and former National Football League (NFL) linebacker for the Denver Broncos.

Born in Bellmawr, New Jersey, Ryan played high school football at Bishop Eustace Preparatory School.
