= Hakeem Valles =

American football player (born 1992)

No. 89, 84
- Position: Tight end

Personal information
- Born: November 23, 1992 (age 33); Sicklerville, New Jersey, U.S.
- Listed height: 6 ft 5 in (1.96 m)
- Listed weight: 260 lb (118 kg)

Career information
- High school: Peddie (Hightstown, New Jersey)
- College: Monmouth (2012–2015)
- NFL draft: 2016: undrafted

Career history
- Arizona Cardinals (2016); Detroit Lions (2017–2018); New York Giants (2018)*; TSL Blues (2021)
- * Offseason or practice squad member only

Career NFL statistics
- Receptions: 2
- Receiving yards: 11
- Stats at Pro Football Reference

Hakeem Valles (born November 23, 1992) is an American former professional football player who was a tight end in the National Football League (NFL). He played college football for the Monmouth Hawks and was signed by the Arizona Cardinals as an undrafted free agent in 2016.

== Early life ==
Valles was born in the Sicklerville section of Winslow Township, New Jersey.

He played high school football at Peddie School in Hightstown, New Jersey as a wide receiver. He garnered First-team All-New Jersey Prep accolades his junior year. He also spent some time at quarterback and defensive back while at Peddie.

== College career ==
Valles played for the Monmouth Hawks of Monmouth University from 2012 to 2015. He was redshirted in 2011. He majored in Business Administration at Monmouth.

He was a wide receiver from 2011 to 2013. He played in four games in 2012 and 12 games in 2013.

He converted to tight end during training camp in 2014. He appeared in 11 games, starting nine, during the 2014 season. He caught 18 passes for 255 yards and three touchdowns. He played in 11 games, all starts, his senior year in 2015. He recorded 22 receptions for 236 yards. He was also a team captain as a senior.

He played in 38 games, starting 20, during his college career. He recorded career totals of 40 receptions for 491 yards and three touchdowns.

== Professional career ==
Valles was rated the 30th best tight end in the 2016 NFL draft by NFLDraftScout.com. Lance Zierlein of NFL.com predicted that he would be selected in the seventh round or be a priority free agent. Zeriein said that Valles was an "Intriguing prospect due to combination of size and speed and an apparent willingness to scrap it out as a blocker." He also said Valles "Has an outside shot of being drafted and might kick around on a practice squad a year or two while he hones his skill at the position."

Pre-draft measurables
Height	Weight	40-yard dash	10-yard split	20-yard split	20-yard shuttle	Three-cone drill	Vertical jump	Broad jump	Bench press
6 ft 3 in (1.91 m)	242 lb (110 kg)	4.69 s	1.64 s	2.62 s	4.46 s	7.28 s	33 1/2 in (0.85 m)	9 ft 10 in (3.00 m)	15 reps
All values from Monmouth Pro Day

=== Arizona Cardinals ===
Valles signed with the Arizona Cardinals on May 2, 2016, after going undrafted in the 2016 NFL draft. He was released by the team on September 3, 2016, and was signed to the practice squad the next day. He was promoted to the active roster on October 6, 2016. He made his NFL debut, and first start in Week 5 against the San Francisco 49ers. He played in 11 games, starting 1, during the 2016 season and recorded three solo tackles.

On September 2, 2017, Valles was waived by the Cardinals.

=== Detroit Lions ===
On September 6, 2017, Valles was signed to the Detroit Lions' practice squad. He was promoted to the active roster on December 26, 2017.

On October 6, 2018, Valles was waived by the Lions and was re-signed to the practice squad. He was released on November 7, 2018.

=== New York Giants ===
On November 27, 2018, Valles was signed to the New York Giants practice squad.

== Personal life ==
His younger brother, Max, also plays in the NFL. Hakeem now invests in real estate and was on the "Bigger Pockets Real Estate" podcast in February 2021.
