= Tashawn Bower =

American football player (born 1995)

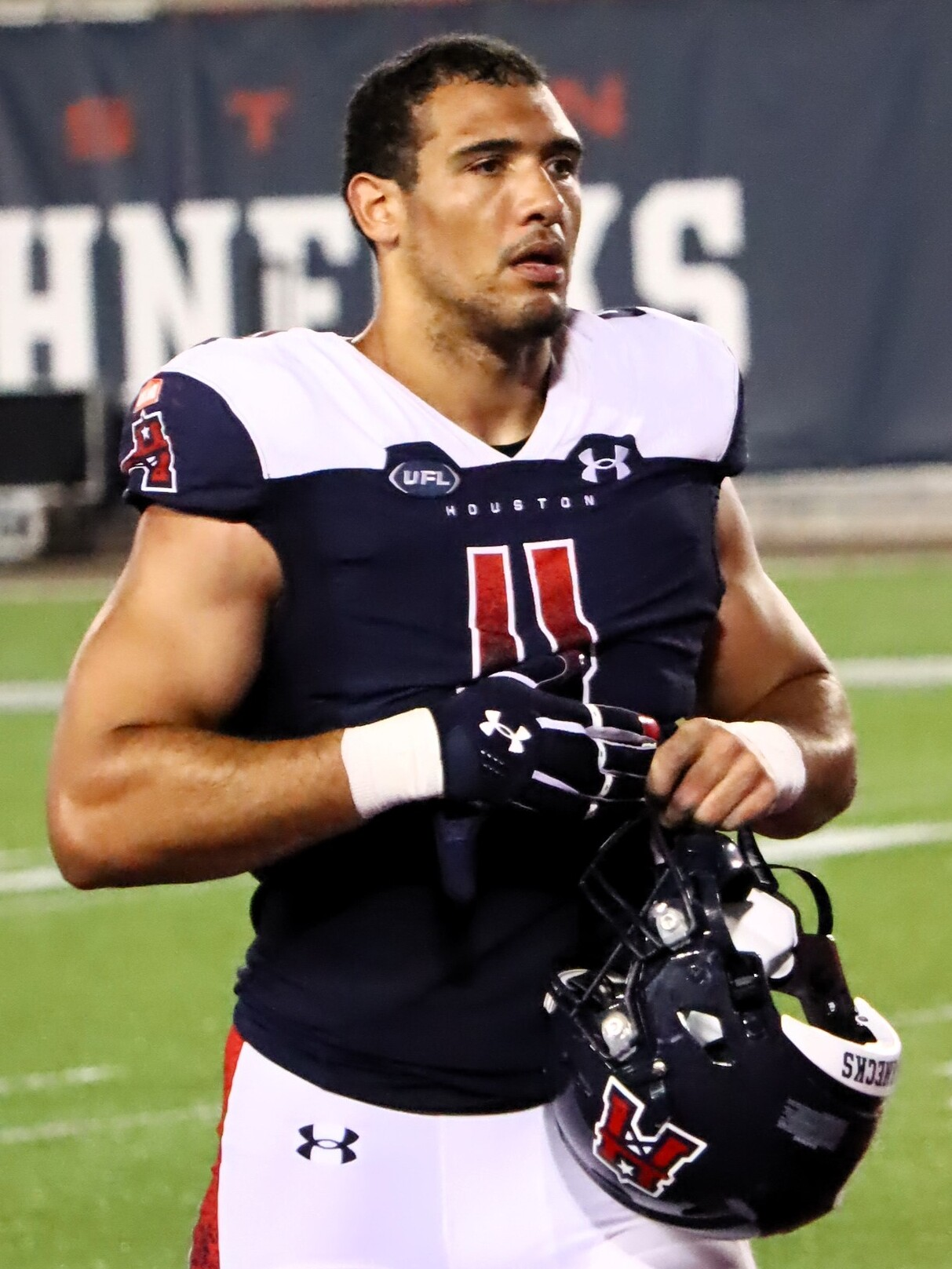
- Bower with the Houston Roughnecks in 2025

Profile
- Position: Linebacker

Personal information
- Born: February 18, 1995 (age 31); Livingston, New Jersey, U.S.
- Listed height: 6 ft 5 in (1.96 m)
- Listed weight: 250 lb (113 kg)

Career information
- High school: Immaculata (Somerville, New Jersey)
- College: LSU
- NFL draft: 2017: undrafted

Career history
- Minnesota Vikings (2017–2019); New England Patriots (2019–2021); Minnesota Vikings (2021); Las Vegas Raiders (2022); New York Giants (2023)*; Houston Roughnecks (2025); Dallas Renegades (2026)
- * Offseason or practice squad member only

Career NFL statistics
- Total tackles: 23
- Sacks: 2.0
- Pass deflections: 1
- Stats at Pro Football Reference

Tashawn Alexander Bower (born February 18, 1995) is an American professional football linebacker. He played college football at LSU.

== Early life ==
Bower grew up in Kenilworth, New Jersey and attended Immaculata High School in Somerville, New Jersey.

== Professional career ==
Pre-draft measurables
Height	Weight	Arm length	Hand span	Wingspan	40-yard dash	10-yard split	20-yard split	20-yard shuttle	Three-cone drill	Vertical jump	Broad jump	Bench press
6 ft 4 3/4 in (1.95 m)	250 lb (113 kg)	33 3/8 in (0.85 m)	9 7/8 in (0.25 m)	6 ft 7 3/4 in (2.03 m)	4.82 s	1.66 s	2.77 s	4.37 s	7.20 s	31.5 in (0.80 m)	9 ft 11 in (3.02 m)	20 reps
All values from NFL Combine

=== Minnesota Vikings (first stint) ===
Bower signed with the Minnesota Vikings as an undrafted free agent on May 1, 2017. Despite being undrafted, he made the Vikings 53 man roster. On October 29, he made his NFL debut against the Cleveland Browns, seeing action on special teams. On November 19, in his second game played, he saw his first defensive action of his career against the Los Angeles Rams and recorded his first career sack, on the Rams' quarterback, Jared Goff.

During the 2019 offseason, Bower suffered a torn Achilles and was placed on the non-football injury list. He was waived from the non-football injury list on October 15, 2019.

=== New England Patriots ===
On November 21, 2019, Bower was signed to the practice squad of the New England Patriots. He signed a reserve/future contract with the Patriots on January 7, 2020.

On September 5, 2020, Bower was waived by the Patriots and signed to the practice squad the next day. He was elevated to the active roster on October 24 and 31 for the team's weeks 7 and 8 games against the San Francisco 49ers and Buffalo Bills, and reverted to the practice squad after each game. He was promoted to the active roster on November 9. On December 31, 2020, Bower was placed on injured reserve.

On August 31, 2021, Bower was waived by the Patriots and re-signed to the practice squad.

=== Minnesota Vikings (second stint) ===
On November 25, 2021, Bower was signed by the Vikings off the Patriots practice squad.

=== Las Vegas Raiders ===
On April 11, 2022, the Las Vegas Raiders signed Bower.

=== New York Giants ===
On July 25, 2023, Bower signed with the New York Giants. He was released on August 27.

=== Houston Roughnecks ===
On April 1, 2025, Bower signed with the Houston Roughnecks of the United Football League (UFL).

=== Dallas Renegades ===
On January 26, 2026, Bower signed with the Dallas Renegades of the United Football League (UFL).
