= Tom Pajic =

American football coach (born 1969)

Biographical details
- Born: January 1, 1969 (age 57)

Playing career
- 1988–1992: Bloomsburg
- Position: Wide receiver

Coaching career (HC unless noted)
- 1993: Paul VI HS (NJ) (WR)
- 1994: Gettysburg (WR)
- 1995–1997: Fordham (TE/assistant ST)
- 1998: Hofstra (ST/WR)
- 1999: Wilkes (OC/QB)
- 2000–2003: South Florida (WR)
- 2004–2011: Bloomsburg (OC/QB/WR)
- 2012–2016: Quincy
- 2017: Temple (DPP)
- 2018–2019: Temple (sr. off. analyst)
- 2024: Albright (OC/WR)

Head coaching record
- Overall: 19–35

Accomplishments and honors

Awards
- First-team All-PSAC (1990)

Tom Pajic (born January 1, 1969) is an American former college football coach. He was the head football coach at Quincy University from 2012 to 2016. He also coached for Paul VI High School, his alma mater, and collegiately at Gettysburg, Fordham, Hofstra, Wilkes, South Florida, Bloomsburg, Temple, and Albright.

Pajic graduated in 1987 from Paul VI High School. He played college football for Bloomsburg as a wide receiver.

== Head coaching record ==
Year	Team	Overall	Conference	Standing	Bowl/playoffs
Quincy Hawks (Great Lakes Valley Conference) (2012–2016)
2012	Quincy	3–8	3–5	T–6th	
2013	Quincy	2–9	1–6	7th	
2014	Quincy	6–5	4–4	6th	
2015	Quincy	3–7	3–5	T–6th	
2016	Quincy	5–6	3–5	T–6th	
Quincy:		19–35	14–25		
Total:		19–35			
