= Immaculate Heart Academy =

High school in Bergen County, New Jersey, US

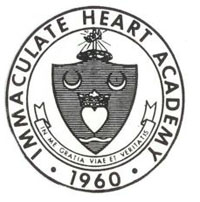

Location
- 500 Van Emburgh Avenue; Township of Washington, (Bergen County), New Jersey 07676; United States; 40.991601°N 74.078059°W

Information
- Type: Private, College-prep Day school
- Religious affiliation: Roman Catholic
- Established: 1960
- Oversight: Roman Catholic Archdiocese of Newark
- NCES School ID: 00863599
- President: Jason Schlereth
- Principal: Kerry Carroll '04
- Faculty: 62.5 FTEs
- Grades: 9–12
- Gender: Girls
- Enrollment: 638 (as of 2023–24)
- Student to teacher ratio: 10.2:1
- Colors: Navy blue and white
- Athletics conference: Big North Conference
- Mascot: Rosie the Blue Eagle
- Team name: Blue Eagles
- Accreditation: Middle States Association of Colleges and SchoolsNew Jersey Association of Independent Schools
- Publication: ORB (literary magazine)
- Newspaper: Accents
- Yearbook: Halcyon
- School fees: $700 (registration)
- Tuition: $21,000 (2025–26)
- Website: www.ihanj.com

Immaculate Heart Academy (IHA) is an all-girls college preparatory private Roman Catholic high school located in Washington Township, in Bergen County, in the U.S. state of New Jersey.

Immaculate Heart Academy has been accredited by the Commission on Secondary Schools of the Middle States Association of Colleges and Schools since 1971 and is accredited until January 2034. The school is also accredited by the New Jersey Association of Independent Schools.

As of the 2023–24 school year, the school had an enrollment of 638 students and 62.5 classroom teachers (on an FTE basis), for a student–teacher ratio of 10.2:1.

The school colors are blue and white, and the school's athletes are known as the Blue Eagles.

== History ==
The school was founded in 1960 by the Sisters of St. Joseph of Peace as the first regional high school for girls in the Roman Catholic Archdiocese of Newark. From 1990 to 2008, administration shifted to the Apostles of the Sacred Heart of Jesus.

The school opened in 1960 with 180 students in ninth grade in an interim site at a church in Paramus, having received approval to build a Permanent facility on almost 11 acres (4.5 ha) in Washington Township that would accommodate a maximum enrollment of one thousand students.

For the 1996–97 school year, Immaculate Heart Academy was recognized with the National Blue Ribbon Award of Excellence from the United States Department of Education, the highest honor that an American school can achieve.

== Consultative Board ==
The Immaculate Heart Academy Consultative Board began its duties on July 1, 2009. In prior years, a Finance Committee had been established and was effectively providing financial advice and direction to the school.

== Athletics ==
The Immaculate Heart Academy Blue Eagles play in the Big North Conference, a super conference that includes 40 public and private high schools in Northern New Jersey and operates under the supervision of the New Jersey State Interscholastic Athletic Association (NJSIAA).

Immaculate Heart Academy has a longstanding rivalry with Academy of the Holy Angels.

Immaculate Heart Academy has 17 athletic teams which include basketball, bowling, cross country, dance, field hockey, flag football, golf, ice hockey, lacrosse, ski racing, soccer, softball, spring track & field, swimming, tennis, volleyball, and winter track & field. IHA added a varsity flag football team to its roster for the 2025–26 season.

=== Softball ===
The softball team won the Non-Public A state title in 1993 (defeating runner-up Paul VI High School in the finals), 1994 (vs. St. John Vianney High School), 1995 (vs. Notre Dame High School), 1996 (vs. Bishop Ahr High School), 1999 (vs. Eustace Preparatory School), 2000 (vs. Bishop Ahr), 2003 (vs. St. John Vianney), 2009 (vs. Bishop Ahr), 2012 (vs. St. John Vianney), 2015 (vs. Pope John XXIII Regional High School), 2016 (vs. Donovan Catholic High School) and 2017 (vs. Donovan Catholic). The program's 12 state titles are the most of any school in the state.

NJ.com / The Star-Ledger ranked Immaculate Heart as their number-one softball team in the state in 1999, 2000, 2009 and 2012. The team earned recognition as the top-ranked team in the state on the inaugural "NJ.com Top 50".

The 2017 team won the Non-Public A state title with a victory against Donovan Catholic in the finals. In the inaugural softball Tournament of Champions, the team won the first ToC title with a 5–4 victory in extra innings against Immaculate Conception High School of Lodi to finish the season with a record of 30-4. For the second straight year, Immaculate Heart was recognized as the number-one softball team in the state on the "NJ.com Top 50".

=== Swimming ===
The swimming team won the Division A state championship in 1994 and won the Non-Public A title in 1995-2005 and 2008-2020. The program's 24 state titles are the most of any school in New Jersey. The streaks of 13 consecutive titles from 2008 to 2020 and of 12 straight wins from 1994 to 2005 are the longest such streaks in the state.

The 2000 team finished the season with an 11-0 record after winning the program's seventh title in a row with a 114-56 win in the Parochial A final against Bishop Ahr High School (since renamed as St. Thomas Aquinas High School).

The 2011 team scored 386 1/2 points at the Bergen Meet of Champions to win its 12th consecutive Bergen County title by a 177-point margin. Later, the team, seeded #2 in the New Jersey Non-Public Group A Tournament, defeated Holy Spirit High School in the state quarterfinals 118-52, Red Bank Catholic in the state semi-finals 107-63 and top-seeded Bishop Eustace High School 108-62 in the finals to win its fourth straight, and a record 16th, state championship.

=== Tennis ===
The tennis team won the Non-Public A state championship in 1995 (defeating runner-up Notre Dame High School in the tournament's final round), 1996 (vs. Notre Dame), 2005 (vs. Holy Spirit High School), 2006 (vs. Red Bank Catholic High School), 2007 (vs. Holy Spirit) and 2008 (vs. Holy Spirit)

In 2006, the team won the Non-Public A title after defeating Red Bank Catholic 4–1 in the finals at Mercer County Park.

The 2008 team won the program's fourth consecutive Non-Public A title with a 3–2 win against Holy Spirit in the finals.

=== Basketball ===
The basketball team won the Non-Public A state championship in 2002 (defeating Red Bank Catholic High School in the finals of the tournament), 2014 (vs. St. John Vianney High School (New Jersey)) and 2023 (vs. St. John Vianney).

The 2004 basketball team won the North Parochial A state championship, defeating Paramus Catholic High School by 36-21 in the tournament final.

In 2005, the NJSIAA stripped the IHA basketball team of 22 of its victories and eliminated the team from the North Non-Public A girls basketball tournament for the use of an ineligible player. The athlete in question had played high school-level basketball at a New York State high school as an eighth grader, a practice that would allow the student to participate in all four years of high school sports in New York, but is not permitted in New Jersey.

=== 2003-08 academic years ===
In 2003, the IHA cross-country team was disqualified from the Northern New Jersey Interscholastic League (NNJIL) C championship for violating High School Federation Rules limiting the number of runners each team could enter in its varsity race to seven, while the coaches had entered nine runners into the race.

In 2007, the soccer team won the Non-Public North Group A sectional championship with a 3–1 win over Morris Catholic High School in the tournament final, the team's first sectional title in four years.

=== 2009-10 academic year ===
During the 2009-10 academic year, Immaculate Heart Academy won the Non-Public Group A state championship in soccer, swimming, winter track and volleyball, where the team also won the New Jersey State Tournament of Champions, gaining the title of best volleyball team in New Jersey by defeating Bridgewater-Raritan High School 25-14, 25-15 in the tournament final The Blue Eagles also won the Non-Public North A sectional titles in basketball (finishing 2nd overall in the state) and spring track (finishing 3rd overall.)

=== 2010-11 academic year ===
The soccer team won its fourth straight Bergen County championship, only the second team in the county to win in four consecutive years. In the state tournament, the Blue Eagles defeated Pingry School for the Non-Public Group A North sectional championship in double overtime by a score of 1-0. The team advanced shared the Non-Public Group A state title with Red Bank Catholic after a 1–1 tie, giving IHA a third straight state title. With this championship, the 2010-11 Blue Eagles Senior Class won 11 out of a possible 12 titles (County, Sectional and State) in their four-year career at IHA.

In volleyball, despite losing in the Bergen County tournament, the Blue Eagles won the Non-Public Group A state championship for the fourth straight year. The team defeated Union Catholic in the state tournament, the third straight year IHA defeated Union Catholic for the state crown. The team advanced to the Tournament of Champions, where they lost in the semifinal round to Ramapo High School.

The basketball team finished the season with a 27-1 record (the most wins in school history), winning the championship at the Joe Poli Tournament and Bergen County Championship and earning the top spot in the final Bergen Record Top 25 poll.

By the end of the 2010-11 academic year, Blue Eagles squads were named by the Bergen Record as the North Jersey Team of the Year in girls' soccer, Bowling, Basketball, and Softball, while The Star-Ledger named the IHA Swimming team the North Jersey Team of the Year.

=== 2011-12 academic year ===
In cross country, IHA won the Big North Conference United Division championship, finished third in the Bergen County Championships, third in the North Non-Public Group A sectional meet, and fifth in the Non-Public Group A state meet to champion Mount Saint Dominic Academy.

In volleyball, IHA won the BCWCA Bergen County tournament by defeating Bogota High School and also won the Non-Public Group A state championship for the fifth straight year, defeating Union Catholic in the state tournament for the fourth consecutive time. The team later won the school's fourth Tournament of Champions title by defeating River Dell High School in the semifinals and Demarest High School in the championship round.

=== 2016-17 academic year ===
The softball team won its third consecutive Non-Public A state championship with a 5–1 win in the final against Donovan Catholic High School. The team won the inaugural New Jersey State Interscholastic Athletic Association softball Tournament of Champions with a 7–6 win in extra innings against Immaculate Conception High School in the tournament final. The program has won the Non-Public A state championship in 1993-96, 1999, 2000, 2003, 2009, 2012 and 2015–2017; the 12 state championships and 19 appearances in tournament finals are the most of any school in the state.

=== The ShopRite Cup ===
Immaculate Heart Academy received the NJSIAA Group A ShopRite Cup for the 2007-08 athletics season, which is awarded annually to the school with the top athletics program in each statewide grouping. The school received this honor for the second consecutive year for its 2008-09 athletics season, and again for the 2009-10 season.

== Notable alumnae ==
- Serena Bocchino (born 1960, class of 1978), artist working primarily in the realm of abstract painting
- Katrina Bowden (born 1988), 30 Rock actress
- Carol Higgins Clark (1956–2023), mystery author and actress
- Mary Jane Clark (born 1954), crime novel author and CBS journalist
- Erin C. Conaton (born 1970), United States Under Secretary of Defense for Personnel and Readiness and 2010 Commencement Speaker
- Chrissy Costanza (born 1995), singer-songwriter and lead vocalist for Against the Current
- Gabriella Cuevas (born 1993), footballer who plays as a centre back for Finnish Kansallinen Liiga club Kuopion Palloseura and the Dominican Republic women's national team
- Mary Beth Keane (born 1977), author of The Walking People
- Bridget Anne Kelly (born 1972), former Deputy Chief of Staff to Governor of New Jersey Chris Christie
- Alyssa Monks (born 1977, class of 1995), painter
- Krysten Moore (born 1989), beauty pageant participant and founder of "S.H.I.N.E." (Students Helping Instill New Esteem)
- Mary Gordon Murray (born 1953), actress and singer who was nominated for a Tony Award for Best Actress in a Musical for Little Me
- Sarah Pagano (born 1991), long-distance runner
- Nia Reed (born 1996), professional volleyball player and member of United States women's national volleyball team
- Tracey Wigfield (born 1983), Emmy Award-winning writer for 30 Rock
