= Immaculata High School (New Jersey) =

Private high school in Somerset County, New Jersey, US

Location
- 240 Mountain Avenue; Somerville, (Somerset County), New Jersey 08876; United States; 40°34′48″N 74°37′7″W

Information
- Type: Private coed high school
- Motto: Faith. Scholarship. Service. Friendship.
- Religious affiliation: Catholic
- Established: 1962
- Founder: Msgr. Eugene Kelly
- School district: Diocese of Metuchen
- Superintendent: Barbara Stevens
- NCES School ID: 01603041
- Principal: Edward Webber
- Faculty: 76.9 FTEs
- Grades: 9–12
- Enrollment: 487 (as of 2021–22)
- Average class size: 23
- Student to teacher ratio: 6.3:1
- Colors: Blue white
- Slogan: Unitas Caritas: “Unity through Charity”
- Athletics conference: Skyland Conference (general); North Jersey Super Football Conference (football)
- Mascot: Joe Spartan
- Nickname: Spartans
- Accreditation: Cognia
- Newspaper: The Spartan Spirit
- Yearbook: Magnificat
- School fees: $300 new / $150 returning (registration)
- Tuition: $16,275 (grades 9-11 for 2022-23)
- Feeder schools: Immaculate Conception School
- Website: www.immaculatahighschool.org

Immaculata High School (also known as Immaculata, Lata, or IHS) is a private, coeducational, Roman Catholic high school in Somerville, in Somerset County, in the U.S. state of New Jersey. Founded in 1962, Immaculata High School operates within the Roman Catholic Diocese of Metuchen. The school was also served by a group of Sisters, Servants of the Immaculate Heart of Mary (from opening through the end of the 2018–19 school year), who lived in a convent attached to the main building of the school. Many of the Sisters taught different subjects in the school's curriculum. Immaculata High School has been accredited by Cognia since 2012.

As of the 2021–22 school year, the school had an enrollment of 487 students and 76.9 classroom teachers (on an FTE basis), for a student–teacher ratio of 6.3:1. The school's student body was 78.4% (382) White, 7.6% (37) Black, 5.7% (28) two or more races, 5.1% (25) Asian, 2.7% (13) Hispanic and 0.4% (2) American Indian / Alaska Native.

== History ==
The Immaculate Conception parish in Somerville had opened an elementary school, which would have its first class graduate from the school in June 1962. Plans were undertaken to have a high school open in time for the graduates of the grammar school. When the school opened in September 1962, there was a 90-student freshman class and a building under construction estimated to cost $1.15 million (equivalent to $12.2 million in 2025).

From the school's founding in 1962 until the end of the 2018–19 school year, when they were assigned to other duties, the school had been staffed by nuns from the Sisters, Servants of the Immaculate Heart of Mary.

== Awards, recognition and rankings ==
During the 1997–98 school year, Immaculata High School was recognized with the Blue Ribbon School Award of Excellence by the United States Department of Education, the highest award an American school can receive.

== Academics ==
Beginning with the 2019–2020 school year, Immaculata students have the option of enrolling in the school's Chesterton Classical Studies program. This program, named for G. K. Chesterton, provides a traditional foundation of studies in the humanities, namely philosophy, theology, language and the other liberal arts. Students in the program take Latin, and study the works of Homer, Socrates, Chaucer, Plato, Aristotle, St. Francis of Assisi, St. Thomas Aquinas, St. Teresa of Avila and others, while engaging in Socratic dialogue and discussion. The goal of the program is to form students intellectually and morally, so that they are capable of navigate the whole of life with prudence and wisdom.

Students are offered many levels of classes, which include AP courses, Honors courses, and College Prep courses.

Immaculata's Unitas Prosperitas (U.P.) program supports students who are classified with learning disabilities and other academic challenges.

== Athletics ==
The Immaculata Spartans compete in the Skyland Conference, which is comprised of public and private high schools in Hunterdon, Somerset and Warren counties in west Central Jersey and operates under the supervision of the New Jersey State Interscholastic Athletic Association. With 354 students in grades 10–12, the school was classified by the NJSIAA for the 2019–20 school year as Non-Public B for most athletic competition purposes, which included schools with an enrollment of 37 to 366 students in that grade range (equivalent to Group I for public schools). The football team competes in the United Blue division of the North Jersey Super Football Conference, which includes 112 schools competing in 20 divisions, making it the nation's biggest football-only high school sports league. The school was classified by the NJSIAA as Non-Public Group B (equivalent to Group I/II for public schools) for football for 2024–2026, which included schools with 140 to 686 students. Immaculata's school colors are blue and white.

Interscholastic sports offered at Immaculata include:

Fall sports

- Cheerleading
- Boys' Cross Country
- Girls' Cross Country
- Football
- Boys' Soccer
- Girls' Soccer
- Girls' Tennis
- Girls' Volleyball
- Marching Band

Winter sports

- Boys' Basketball
- Girls' Basketball
- Bowling
- Girls Cheerleading
- Cheerleading Competition Team JV and Varsity
- Swimming
- Indoor Track
- Wrestling

Spring sports

- Baseball
- Golf
- Boys' Lacrosse
- Girls' Lacrosse
- Softball
- Boys' Tennis
- Track

The 1981 softball team finished the season with a 23-5-1 record after winning the Group I state title with a 2-0 one-hitter against Becton Regional High School in the championship game.

The 1987 girls' basketball team finished the season with a 24–4 record after winning the Non-Public Group B state title with a 54–40 victory against runner-up Bishop Eustace in the championship game played at Brookdale Community College.

The baseball team won the Non-Public B state championship in 1995 (defeating Gloucester Catholic High School in the tournament final) and won the Non-Public A title in 2010 (vs. St. Joseph High School). The 2010 team finished the season 22–5 after coming back from a 5–1 seventh-inning deficit to tie the game and then win the Non-Public A title with a 7–5 walk-off win in extra innings against St. Joseph in the championship game. The team has won the Somerset County Tournament in 1991, 1994, 1997–2002, 2004, 2006-2008 and 2018; the 13 titles (through 2018) are the most in the tournament's history since it was established in 1973.

The boys' lacrosse team won the Non-Public B state championship in 2007 (vs. Pingry School), 2009 and 2010 (vs. Pingry both years), 2011 (vs. Montclair Kimberley Academy) and 2014 (vs. Morristown-Beard School). The program's five state titles are tied for eighth in the state.

The boys basketball team won the Non-Public Group A title in 2008 vs. Camden Catholic High School and in 2009 vs. Christian Brothers Academy. The 2009 team won the program's second consecutive Non-Public A title with a 61–50 win against Christian Brothers at the Ritacco Center in Toms River.

The bowling team won the Group I state championship in 2014.

=== Cross country / track ===
The boys indoor track team won the Non-Public B state championship in 2020.

The boys outdoor track team won the Non-Public B state championship in 2021.

=== Football ===
The football team won the Non-Public B North state sectional championships in 1984 and 1985, and won in Non-Public Group II in 1994 and in Non-Public Group III in 2006; the team appeared in the state finals on six other occasions (1998, 2001, 2007, 2008, 2009, 2012). The 1984 team finished the season with a record of 11-0 after winning the Parochial B North sectional title after defeating Pope John XXIII Regional High School by a score of 12–0 in the championship game. The 1994 team finished the season with a 10–1 record after winning the Non-Public II title with a 27–7 win in the group finals against Delbarton School. In 2006, Immaculata's football team faced Delbarton in the Non-Public Group III final at Rutgers University, winning 22–14, and finishing the season with a record of 12–0, the first team in school history to finish their season with 12 wins, and were ranked in the top 5 in the state by various Top 20 polls.

Pierce G. Frauenheim coached the Spartans since the high school formed a team in 1966 through the 2012 season. Frauenheim coached his 400th career game on November 17, 2006, when the Spartans defeated Holy Spirit High School in the NJSIAA semifinals by a score of 35–6. In January 2013, John Hack, assistant coach and 2000 graduate of the school, was named Immaculata's head football coach after Frauenheim's retirement. Frauenheim had served as head football coach for 47 years, starting when the school opened in 1962, finishing with four state titles and an overall record of 332–137–2.

The Spartans won 23 consecutive games in the 2006–2007 seasons (12 in 2006, 11 in 2007), the longest streak in team history, before losing in the NJSIAA Non-Public Group III state final by a score of 26–13 to Holy Spirit High School on December 1, 2007, at Rutgers University.

== Performing and Visual Arts ==
=== Marching Band ===
The Immaculata High School Spartan Marching Band is one of the cornerstones of the school, consisting of over 90 wind, percussion and color guard members. The band performs at all school football games and competes in United States Scholastic Band Association (USSBA) competitions in the New Jersey area. Among the many accolades the band has achieved are: marching in the 1989 Presidential Inaugural Parade in Washington DC, and traveling to Canada, Virginia, and Florida, and all over the Northeastern United States. In 2008, the band placed first in USSBA National Competition at the Annapolis Naval Academy winning Best Music, Percussion, Colorguard, and Overall Effect with their show called "Heroes".

In the 2011 competition season, the band won the USSBA (now USBands) Group 6 Open New Jersey state championships with a score of 96.925 with their show "The Planetarium", taking the captions for Best Visual, Best Effect, Best Color Guard, Best Percussion, and The Cadets Award for Excellence. They also placed second in National Competition at the United States Naval Academy in Annapolis with a score of 97.988, winning awards for Best Music, Best Effect, Best Color Guard & Best Percussion.

While celebrating the 50th anniversary of the school during the 2012 season with their "We Are Spartans" show, the band captured the USBands NJ State and National titles. At States, the band took all special awards (Music, Visual, Effect, Color Guard and Percussion) and had a score of 97.375. At National, IHS came out first over 15 band, taking home the Best Music special award and scored a 96.587, narrowly winning the title by .049 points over their nearest competitor.

== Clubs ==
=== Robotics ===
Cold Fusion 1279 is Immaculata's robotics team. Cold Fusion participates in FIRST robotics competitions. In 2019, Cold Fusion appeared in the finals of the Mid-Atlantic Regional Championship.

== Legal controversy ==
In November 2013, former Immaculata volunteer coach Patrick Lott was sentenced to six years in prison after he pleaded guilty to multiple counts of child endangerment and invasion of privacy. Between 2007 and 2011, Lott had videotaped male students in the showers at Immaculata High.

== Notable alumni ==
- Wade Baldwin IV (born 1996), professional basketball player for Maccabi Tel Aviv of the Israeli Basketball Premier League, formerly for the Portland Trail Blazers of the National Basketball Association (NBA), on a two-way contract with the NBA G League.
- Tashawn Bower (born 1995), defensive end for the Minnesota Vikings, New England Patriots, and Las Vegas Raiders of the National Football League (NFL). He played college football at LSU.
- Tom Brislin (born 1973), keyboardist, vocalist, songwriter and producer; he was inducted in the school's hall of fame in 2016.
- Jack Cust (born 1979), Major League Baseball player, mostly with the Oakland Athletics.
- Anthony Gargiulo (born 1984). defensive end who played in the Canadian Football League for the Calgary Stampeders.
- Theo Riddick (born 1991), running back for the Denver Broncos. In June 2016 Immaculata's football field was named for Riddick.
- Jason Ryan (born 1976), pitcher who played two seasons for Minnesota Twins.
- Gordon Sammis, college football coach
- Brandon Wagner (born 1995), professional baseball player.
