= Sicklerville, New Jersey =

Place in Camden County, New Jersey, United States

- Census-designated place
- Location in Camden County Location in New Jersey Location in the United States
- Coordinates: 39°43′02″N 74°58′10″W
- Country: United States
- State: New Jersey
- County: Camden
- Township: Winslow
- Established: 1851
- Named after: John Sickler

Area
  - Total: 17.52 sq mi (45.37 km^{2})
  - Land: 17.36 sq mi (44.97 km^{2})
  - Water: 0.16 sq mi (0.41 km^{2})
- Elevation: 141 ft (43 m)

Population (2020)
  - Total: 45,084
  - Density: 2,596.6/sq mi (1,002.55/km^{2})
- Time zone: UTC−05:00 (Eastern (EST))
  - Summer (DST): UTC−04:00 (Eastern (EDT))
- ZIP Code: 08081
- FIPS code: 34-67470
- GNIS feature ID: 880588

Sicklerville is an unincorporated community and census-designated place (CDP) located within Winslow Township in Camden County, in the U.S. state of New Jersey. As of the 2020 census, Sicklerville had a population of 45,084. It was founded in 1851 by John Sickler, who lived in the area when the present-day town was located within Gloucester Township. The area is served as United States Postal Service ZIP Code 08081.

== History ==
In 1874, the Sicklerville Post Office was established. Paul H. Sickler (his descendants still live in Winslow Township) was appointed the first Postmaster. Today, the Post Office is located near the original location on Sicklerville Road. The Post Office also services contiguous addresses in portions of Gloucester Township and Washington Township.

Sicklerville was founded as "Sickler Town". In 1886, there were only ten residences in Sicklerville.

== Demographics ==
Historical population
Census	Pop.	Note	%±
2020	45,084		—
U.S. Decennial Census

Sicklerville was first listed as a census designated place in the 2020 U.S. census.

=== 2020 census ===
As of the 2020 census, Sicklerville had a population of 45,084. The median age was 38.3 years. 23.8% of residents were under the age of 18 and 12.9% of residents were 65 years of age or older. For every 100 females there were 90.9 males, and for every 100 females age 18 and over there were 86.3 males age 18 and over.

100.0% of residents lived in urban areas, while 0.0% lived in rural areas.

There were 15,726 households in Sicklerville, of which 36.7% had children under the age of 18 living in them. Of all households, 49.4% were married-couple households, 13.6% were households with a male householder and no spouse or partner present, and 29.8% were households with a female householder and no spouse or partner present. About 19.9% of all households were made up of individuals and 8.0% had someone living alone who was 65 years of age or older.

There were 16,452 housing units, of which 4.4% were vacant. The homeowner vacancy rate was 2.0% and the rental vacancy rate was 4.5%.

Racial composition as of the 2020 census
Race	Number	Percent
White	19,481	43.2%
Black or African American	18,045	40.0%
American Indian and Alaska Native	203	0.5%
Asian	2,057	4.6%
Native Hawaiian and Other Pacific Islander	11	0.0%
Some other race	1,940	4.3%
Two or more races	3,347	7.4%
Hispanic or Latino (of any race)	4,691	10.4%

Sicklerville CDP, New Jersey – Racial and ethnic composition Note: the US Census treats Hispanic/Latino as an ethnic category. This table excludes Latinos from the racial categories and assigns them to a separate category. Hispanics/Latinos may be of any race.
Race / Ethnicity (NH = Non-Hispanic)	Pop 2020	2020
White alone (NH)	18,675	41.42%
Black or African American alone (NH)	17,356	38.50%
Native American or Alaska Native alone (NH)	110	0.24%
Asian alone (NH)	2,043	4.53%
Native Hawaiian or Pacific Islander alone (NH)	9	0.02%
Other race alone (NH)	230	0.51%
Mixed race or Multiracial (NH)	1,970	4.37%
Hispanic or Latino (any race)	4,691	10.41%
Total	45,084	100.00%

=== 2010 census ===
At the 2010 census, there were 50,589 people, 17,007 households, and 13,209 families living in the corresponding ZIP Code Tabulation Area. The population density was 1,900 inhabitants per square mile (730/km^{2}). There were 17,805 housing units at an average density of 172.8/sq mi (66.7/km^{2}). The racial make-up of the town is 45.3% White, 44.9% African American, 0.3% Native American, 4.1% Asian, 0.0% Pacific Islander, 2.3% from other races, and 3.1% from two or more races. Hispanic or Latino of any race were 7.0% of the population.

Of the 6,873 households 40.4% had children under the age of 18 living with them, 55.7% were married couples living together, 16.7% had a female householder with no husband present, and 22.3% were non-families. 17.9% of households were one person and 5.4% were one person aged 65 or older. The average household size was 2.97 and the average family size was 3.37.

The age distribution was 31.4% under the age of 19, 6.1% from 19 to 24, 27.7% from 25 to 44, 27.3% from 45 to 64, and 7.5% 65 or older. The median age was 35.3 years. The population is 51.9% female and 48.1% male.

The median household income was $79,746 and the median family income was $90,510. Males had a median income $63,818 versus $50,935 for females. The per capita income for the town was $31,468. About 5.4% of families and 7.3% of the population were below the poverty line, including 11.8% of those under age 18 and 5.5% of those age 65 or over.

=== 2000 census ===
At the 2000 census, there were 42,891 people, 14,066 households, and 11,342 families living in the corresponding ZIP Code Tabulation Area. The population density was 1,847 inhabitants per square mile (713/km^{2}). There were 14,811 housing units at an average density of 172.8/sq mi (66.7/km^{2}). The racial make-up of the town is 68.2% White, 26.3% African American, 0.3% Native American, 2.1% Asian, 0.0% Pacific Islander, 1.1% from other races, and 1.9% from two or more races. Hispanic or Latino of any race were 3.5% of the population.

Of the 5,483 households 49.1% had children under the age of 18 living with them, 62.5% were married couples living together, 13.8% had a female householder with no husband present, and 19.4% were non-families. 15.5% of households were one person and 4.2% were one person aged 65 or older. The average household size was 3.05 and the average family size was 3.41.

The age distribution was 21.8% under the age of 18, 4.8% from 18 to 24, 35.5% from 25 to 44, 18.8% from 45 to 64, and 5.5% 65 or older. The median age was 38 years. For every 100 females, there were 88.7 males. For every 100 females age 18 and over, there were 85.4 males.

The median household income was $61,366 and the median family income was $66,234. Males had a median income of $46,143 versus $32,420 for females. The per capita income for the town was $21,903. About 4.8% of families and 5.8% of the population were below the poverty line, including 7.3% of those under age 18 and 5.0% of those age 65 or over.

== Houses of worship ==
Places of worship in Sicklerville include:

- Two Baptist churches
- The Sicklerville Methodist Episcopal (oldest church, constructed over 131 years ago)
- One other Methodist church
- One Catholic church – St. Charles Borromeo
- R.S. Fink Shrine (second-oldest church, constructed over 127 years ago)
- Iglesia ni Cristo Church
- Stagecoach Road Christian Fellowship

== Notable people ==
People who were born in, residents of, or otherwise closely associated with Sicklerville include:

- Jordan Burroughs (born 1988), Olympic gold medalist 2012 – freestyle wrestling
- Damiere Byrd (born 1993), wide receiver for the Chicago Bears
- Irvin Charles (born 1997), American football wide receiver for the New York Jets
- Ed Forchion (born 1964), marijuana rights activist who uses the name "NJWEEDMAN"
- Priscilla Frederick (born 1989), high jumper and silver medalist at the 2015 Pan American Games
- Shonn Greene (born 1985), former running back for the New York Jets
- Kyle Hines (born 1986), one of only six players in NCAA basketball history to amass 2,000 points, 1,000 rebounds and 300 blocks in a collegiate career
- Tziarra King (born 1998), professional soccer player who plays as a forward for National Women's Soccer League (NWSL) club Utah Royals FC
- Devin Leary, American football quarterback for the NC State Wolfpack
- Brendan McHugh (born 1990), swimmer who specializes in breaststroke events
- Mike Rozier (born 1961), former football Heisman Trophy-winning running back who played in the United States Football League and the National Football League
- Tarheeb Still (born 2002), attended University of Maryland as a defensive back and was drafted in 2024 to National Football League by the Los Angeles Chargers
- Hakeem Valles (born 1992), tight end for the Arizona Cardinals
- Max Valles (born 1994), defensive end for the Buffalo Bills
