= Brandon Wagner (baseball) =

American baseball player (born 1995)

Free agent
- Infielder
- Born: August 24, 1995 (age 30); Princeton, New Jersey, U.S.
- Bats: Left Throws: Right
- Stats at Baseball Reference

Brandon Michael Wagner (born August 24, 1995) is an American professional baseball infielder who is a free agent. He was drafted by the New York Yankees in the sixth round of the 2015 Major League Baseball draft.

== Career ==
Raised in Hopewell Township, Wagner attended Immaculata High School in Somerville, New Jersey. The Philadelphia Phillies selected him in the 39th round, with the 1,171st overall selection, of the 2013 MLB draft. He did not sign with Philadelphia, enrolling at Howard College to play college baseball for the Howard Hawks.

=== New York Yankees ===
The New York Yankees selected Wagner in the sixth round, with the 183rd overall selection, of the 2015 MLB draft. Wagner made his professional debut with the Low-A Staten Island Yankees, hitting .228 in 52 weeks. In 2016, he split the year between the Gulf Coast Yankees and the rookie-level Pulaski Yankees, slashing .267/.369/.471 with 8 home runs and 24 RBI. He played with the Single-A Charleston RiverDogs in 2017, batting .277/.380/.393 with 7 home runs and 51 RBI in 110 games. In 2018, he began the season with the Tampa Tarpons of the High-A Florida State League and was promoted to the Trenton Thunder of the Double-A Eastern League in July. He hit .267/.380/.461 in 124 total contests between the two teams.

In 2019, Wagner spent the year with Trenton, also playing in two games for the Triple-A Scranton/Wilkes-Barre RailRiders, but struggled to a .179/.290/.280 slash in 119 games. Wagner did not play in a game in 2020 due to the cancellation of the minor league season because of the COVID-19 pandemic. In 2021, he appeared in 63 games for the Double-A Somerset Patriots and Scranton, slashing .168/.305/.258 with 4 home runs and 18 RBI. He elected minor league free agency following the season on November 7, 2021.

=== Staten Island FerryHawks ===
On April 20, 2022, Wagner signed with the Staten Island FerryHawks of the Atlantic League of Professional Baseball. He appeared in 40 games for Staten Island, slashing .198/.315/.278 with 2 home runs, 6 RBI, and 2 stolen bases. He was released by the team on June 11.

=== Lancaster Stormers ===
On May 9, 2025, after two years of inactivity, Wagner signed with the Lancaster Stormers of the Atlantic League of Professional Baseball. In 15 appearances for Lancaster, he batted .182/.316/.318 with two home runs and eight RBI. Wagner was released by the Stormers on June 9.

=== Cleburne Railroaders ===
On January 5, 2026, Wagner signed with the Cleburne Railroaders of the American Association of Professional Baseball. However, he was released prior to the start of the regular season on April 14.
