= Paul VI High School =

Catholic high school in Camden County, New Jersey, US

Location
- 901 Hopkins Road; Haddon Township, Camden County, New Jersey 08033; United States
- 39.896979°N 75.062166°W

Information
- Type: Private, Coeducational
- Motto: Fortis In Fide (Strength In Faith)
- Religious affiliation: Catholic Church
- Established: 1966
- Authority: Diocese of Camden
- CEEB code: 310473
- NCES School ID: 00864388
- President: Michael Chambers
- Rector: Fr. Philip Ramos
- Principal: Philip J. Gianfortune
- Faculty: 60.4 FTEs
- Grades: 9–12
- Enrollment: 1,049 (as of 2023–24)
- Student to teacher ratio: 17.4:1
- Campus size: 35 acres (14 ha)
- Campus type: Shaped like an eagle; Letter 'W'
- Colors: Royal blue and white
- Song: "Soar Eagle, Soar!" adapted from Jean Sibelius's Finlandia Hymn
- Athletics: See Athletics
- Athletics conference: Olympic Conference (general); West Jersey Football League (football)
- Mascot: The Paul VI Eagle
- Team name: Eagles
- Rivals: Camden Catholic High School; Eustace Preparatory School
- Accreditation: Middle States Association of Colleges and Schools
- Publication: Aerie (literary/art magazine)
- Newspaper: The Talon
- Yearbook: Shalom
- Tuition: $12,845 (for 2025–26)
- Website: www.pvihs.org

Paul VI High School is a private Catholic high school located in Haddon Township, in Camden County, in the U.S. state of New Jersey. As there is no post office in Haddon Township, the mailing address is Haddonfield. The school, founded in 1966, is named in honor of Pope Paul VI and is overseen by the Diocese of Camden. The school has been accredited by the Middle States Association of Colleges and Schools Commission on Elementary and Secondary Schools since 1979 and is accredited until July 2030.

As of the 2023–24 school year, the school had an enrollment of 1,049 students and 60.4 classroom teachers (on an FTE basis), for a student–teacher ratio of 17.4:1. The school's student body was 76.0% (797) White, 8.3% (87) Black, 7.4% (78) Hispanic, 4.4% (46) two or more races, 3.4% (36) Asian and 0.5% (5) Native Hawaiian / Pacific Islander.

The 244-meet win streak by the boys cross country team, which ended in October 2007 after 28 years, was cited by The Philadelphia Inquirer as "an epic achievement".

== History ==
Construction on the school, convent and parish building began in January 1965. The school, designed by Armond Nasuti of Haddon Heights, and built by Cresco Builders of Pennsauken, at an estimated cost of $2 million (equivalent to $20.4 million in 2025), is designed like a large “W” with common facilities such as the cafeteria and gym in the center area and classrooms along the extremities. When the school was first opened, boys and girls were in the separate wings, sharing facilities such as library, cafeteria and gym.

The school was built with 50 homerooms, a 1,000-seat auditorium, a 1,500-capacity gym, a 50-seat chapel, and a large library for a capacity enrollment of 2,000 students. Constructed on the 35-acre (14 ha) campus of St. Vincent Pallotti parish, the school opened in 1966 with more than 600 students. It was staffed at the time by 10 priests of the Camden Diocese, 18 sisters and 10 lay teachers. The sisters were members of the Religious Teachers Filippini.

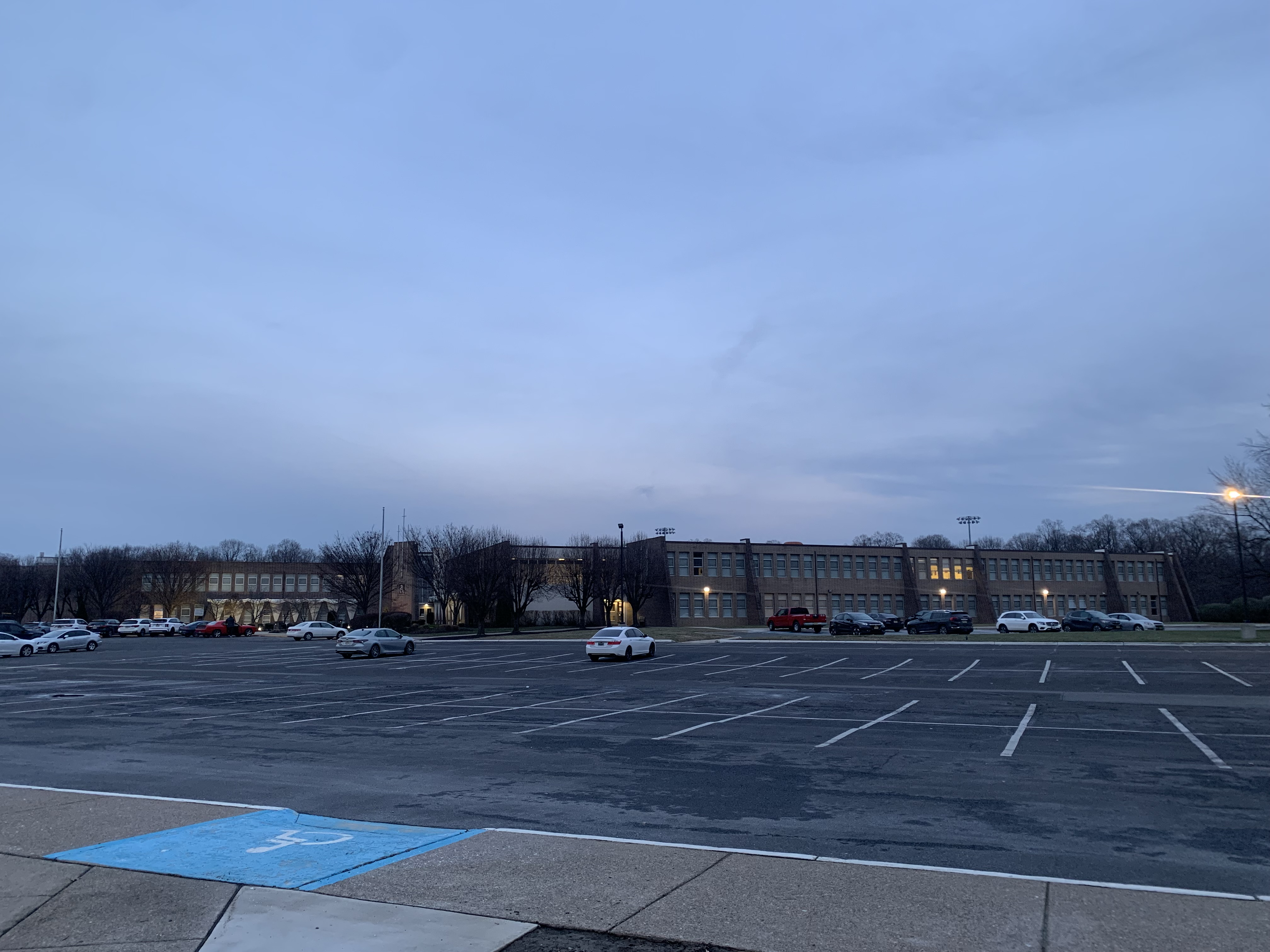
Looking toward the main entrance and south wing of the school.

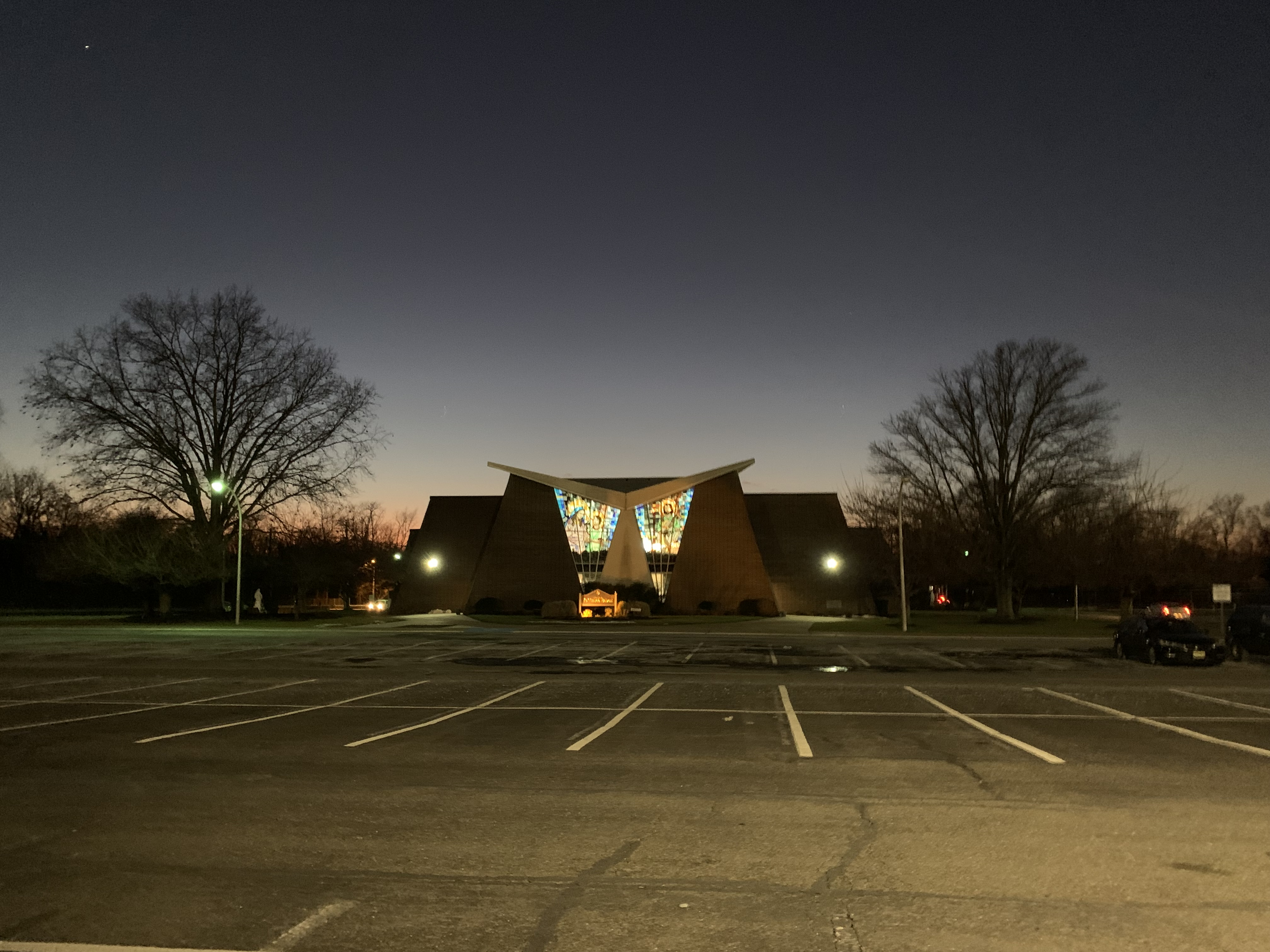
Looking at the entrance of St. Vincent Pallotti Church with the church/school parking lot in the foreground.

== Student life ==
Paul VI is separated into four classes: Freshmen, Sophomores, Juniors, and Seniors. The school year begins in early September, and ends in the middle of June (Seniors graduate in late May or early June). Extended periods of vacation are given at Christmas and Easter.

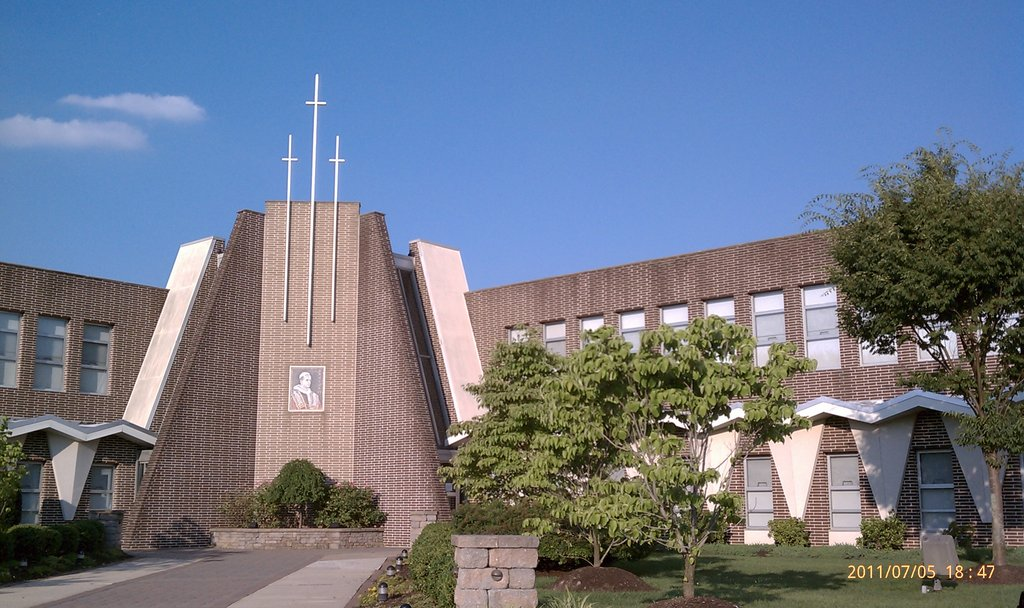
Main entrance to Paul VI High School

Students are required to wear the designated school uniforms for the entirety of the day, except during casual days. Separate gym uniforms are required for Physical Education. Discipline is organized into a system of demerits, whereby demerits are given out to students who break the school code of conduct as published annually in the student handbook. The number of demerits given depends on the severity of the infraction. Ten demerits result in a student receiving a detention. As Paul VI is a Catholic high school, students are expected to act according to Catholic teaching.

Students are required to take four years of math, English/Literature and religion in order to graduate. Three years of science and history are also required, as are two years of a foreign language, and freshman/sophomore year physical education.

== Athletics ==
The Paul VI Eagles compete in the Patriot Division of the Olympic Conference, which operates under the supervision of the New Jersey State Interscholastic Athletic Association. With 803 students in grades 10-12, the school was classified by the NJSIAA for the 2019–20 school year as Non-Public A for most athletic competition purposes, which included schools with an enrollment of 381 to 1,454 students in that grade range (equivalent to Group III for public schools). The football team competes in the National Division of the 94-team West Jersey Football League superconference and was classified by the NJSIAA as Non-Public Group B (equivalent to Group I/II for public schools) for football for 2024–2026, which included schools with 140 to 686 students.

The school participates as the host school / lead agency in a joint ice hockey team with Camden Catholic High School. The co-op program operates under agreements scheduled to expire at the end of the 2023–24 school year.

The Eagles' main rival is Camden Catholic High School, whom they play in football every Thanksgiving. Eustace Preparatory School is another rival.

Sports offered at Paul VI include:

- Boys
  - Fall – soccer, football, cross country
  - Winter – basketball, indoor track, ice hockey, swimming, wrestling
  - Spring – lacrosse, track & field, golf, baseball, tennis, volleyball
- Girls
  - Fall – soccer, tennis, cross country, field hockey, cheerleading, volleyball, dance/drill team
  - Winter – basketball, indoor track, swimming, cheerleading, dance/drill team
  - Spring – lacrosse, track & field, softball, dance/drill team

The boys track team won the Non-Public Group B spring / outdoor track state championship in 1970, and won the Non-Public A title in 1974, 1989-1991. The 1989 team edged second-place finisher and defending champion Christian Brothers Academy by a score of 33.5 to 33 to take the Parochial A title.

The girls' spring / outdoor track and field team won the Group III state championship in 1978, and the Non-Public A title in 1986 and 2001.

The boys' basketball team won the Non-Public Group A state championship in 1980 (defeating runner-up Marist High School in the finals), 1983 (vs. Immaculata High School) and 1988 (vs. Bergen Catholic High School). The 1980 team won the Parochial A title by a score of 37-36 against Marist on a shot scored with seconds left in the game. The team won the 1983 Parochial A state championship with a 55-54 win against Immaculata on a last-second tip-in scored in the tournament final at the Meadowlands Arena.

The boys wrestling team won the Parochial A South state sectional championships every year from 1981 to 1992. The team won the Parochial A state championships in 1982, 1984–1990 and 1992. The team's nine state group titles are tied for fourth-most in the state and the streak of seven consecutive group titles is tied for the state's third longest.

The football team won the Non-Public A South state sectional championships in 1981.

The girls cross country running team won the Non-Public Group A state championship in 1982, 1984, 1985, 1994, 1995, and won the Group IV title in 1986. The program's six state titles are ranked ninth statewide

The ice hockey team won the Monsignor Kelly Cup in 2010.

The boys' soccer team won the 2003 NJSIAA Parochial A state sectional championship with a 3–1 win over Notre Dame High School.

=== Boys' cross country and winning streak ===
The Paul VI boys' cross country team had a dual meet unbeaten streak that started in 1979 and ended at 244 straight wins after 28 years. On October 10, 2007, Camden Catholic High School beat them 21–36 and took the division championship, ending the longest unbeaten streak in recent memory. In an editorial, The Philadelphia Inquirer cited the streak, which started when Jimmy Carter was president, as "an epic achievement". They have not lost since, and beat Camden Catholic High School in a dual meet during the 2008 season. Haddonfield High School now owns the current longest streak for South Jersey at 102 wins.

The boys cross country running team won the Non-Public Group A state championship in 1983-1985, 1988-1990 and 1994. The program's seven state titles are tied for tenth in the state. The team won the Meet of Champions in 1984, 1988, 1989 and 1994. The four MoC titles are the second-most of any school in the state.

== Administration ==
Core members of the school's administration are:

- Michael Chambers, president
- Philip Gianfortune, principal

== Notable alumni ==
- Andrew Bailey (born 1984), former MLB relief pitcher who has been a pitching coach for the Boston Red Sox
- Irvin Charles (born 1997), American football wide receiver for the New York Jets
- James F. Checchio (born 1966, class of 1984), former rector of the Pontifical North American College who is coadjutor archbishop of New Orleans since 2025
- Ron Curry (born 1993), professional basketball player for MKS Dąbrowa Górnicza of the Polish Basketball League
- Jonathan Grimes (born 1989), NFL running back who last played for the Houston Texans
- Hannah Hidalgo (born 2005, class of 2023), college basketball player for the Notre Dame Fighting Irish women's basketball team
- Ann Morhauser (born 1957), glass artist
- Tom Pajic (born 1969, class of 1987), former college football coach who was the head football coach of the Quincy Hawks from 2012 to 2016
- Brittany Ratcliffe (born 1994, class of 2012), professional soccer player for the Washington Spirit in the National Women's Soccer League
