= Krysten Moore =

- Born: November 22, 1989 (age 36); Mahwah, New Jersey
- Education: University of Massachusetts Amherst
- Employer: Raytheon
- Board member of: Founder, S.H.I.N.E. (Students Helping Instill New Esteem)
- Awards: 2007 Miss Teen New Jersey International; 2008 National American Miss New Jersey Teen; Miss South Jersey 2010; Miss Columbus Day 2011; Miss Bergen County 2012; Miss Gateway 2013

Krysten Moore (born November 22, 1989) is from Mahwah, New Jersey and is the founder of "S.H.I.N.E." (Students Helping Instill New Esteem), the winner of the 2007 Miss Teen New Jersey International pageant, the 2008 National American Miss New Jersey Teen pageant, and is the National Youth Ambassador and spokesperson for Love Our Children USA and STOMP Out Bullying.

== Bullied past ==
Bullied in her youth because of her weight, she went on to founded S.H.I.N.E. as a means to educate others as to the harmful effects of bullying and how to overcome its effects. Through her organization she has been able to speak to thousands of students worldwide. As an honor student at Immaculate Heart Academy recognized by the 2004/2005 Who's Who Among American High School Students, she entered the Miss Teen International pageant, received the "Congeniality Award", and was chosen "Miss Teen New Jersey International". She is now the National Bully Prevention spokesperson for Love Our Children USA and has accumulated more than 15,000 hours of community service by volunteering with organizations such as Habitat for Humanity MDA and the Juvenile Diabetes Research Fund. She has been featured on national and local TV, including the Rachael Ray Show, CBS Early Show, Access Hollywood, Good Day Street Talk, New Jersey News 12, New Jersey FIOS News One, MTV Documentary Bullied, Cake Boss and rang the NASDAQ closing bell.

Moore participated as a special presenter on the subject of bullying at the 3rd and 14th Annual New York State Cyber Security Awareness Conference in Albany, New York.

== Pageant history ==
Krysten has been involved in the pageant circuit for several years and won Miss South Jersey 2010, Miss Columbus Day 2011, Miss Bergen County 2012, Miss Gateway 2013 which enabled her to compete for Miss New Jersey. Moore is actively fundraising for S.H.I.N.E, Children's Miracle Network, STOMP Out Bullying, and Love Our Children USA.
