= Phillipsburg Catholic High School =

Defunct Catholic high school in Warren County, New Jersey, US

Location
- 137 Roseberry Street (1961–1994); Phillipsburg, Warren County, New Jersey 08865; United States; 40.698470°N 75.176482°W

Information
- Type: Private, Coeducational
- Religious affiliation: Roman Catholic
- Established: 1875
- Closed: 1994
- Grades: 9–12

Phillipsburg Catholic High School was a parochial high school in Phillipsburg, New Jersey. It was operated by the Roman Catholic parish of Saints Philip and James Church in Phillipsburg.

== History ==
The school originally opened in 1923 as Sts. Philip and James Parochial School and shared a building on South Main Street with Sts Philip and James Elementary School. As enrollment increased, by 1958 the need for a new high school location was evident. Twenty-one acres of land on Roseberry Street were purchased and after an ambitious campaign drive led by Reverend Joseph V. Kozak, the new high school was dedicated on August 20, 1961, as Phillipsburg Catholic High School.

In 1989 the parish turned over the operation of the school to the Diocese of Metuchen to be operated as a regional school named All Saints Regional School. The Sisters of Mercy left at the end of the 1989–90 school year, bringing to an end over 100 years of service given to the Phillipsburg community. The Diocese arranged for the services of another order, the Sister Servants of the Most Sacred Heart of Jesus. In 1994 the high school was closed, citing low enrollment and fiscal expenses. The elementary school was moved to the high school building.

In 1999 the elementary school was converted back to a parish school associated with Sts. Philip and James Church. It was renamed Sts. Philip and James School.

== Athletics ==
The baseball team won the Non-Public Group C state championship in 1975, defeating St. Peter the Apostle High School in the tournament final.

The field hockey team won the Parochial B North title in 1982 and went on to be named as Parochial B co-champion with Eustace Preparatory School after a scoreless tie in the championship game.

== Notable alumni ==
- Tom Brennan (born 1949), radio and television sportscaster and former men's basketball head coach, most notably at the University of Vermont from 1986 to 2005.
- Dick Lynch (1936–2008), football player for University of Notre Dame and the New York Giants from 1959 to 1966.
