= St. Joseph Academy (New Jersey) =

Catholic high school in Atlantic County, New Jersey, US

Location
- 328 Vine Street; Hammonton, Atlantic County, New Jersey 08037; United States; 39.637115°N 74.800189°W

Information
- Type: Private, Coeducational
- Religious affiliation: Roman Catholic
- Established: 1942 (as St. Joseph High School); 2021 (as St. Joseph Academy)
- School district: Diocese of Camden
- NCES School ID: 00864708
- President: Stephen Cappuccio
- Chairperson: Nancy McHugh
- Faculty: 17.4 FTEs
- Grades: 9-12
- Student to teacher ratio: 9.7:1
- Colors: Red and white
- Athletics conference: Cape-Atlantic League (general); West Jersey Football League (football)
- Team name: Wildcats
- Rival: Hammonton High School; Holy Spirit High School
- Accreditation: Middle States Association of Colleges and Schools
- Newspaper: The Voice
- Tuition: $12,450 (2025–26)
- Website: stjosephacademy.com

St. Joseph Academy is a four-year co-educational high school located in Hammonton, in Atlantic County, in the U.S. state of New Jersey, serving students in grades 9–12. The Academy was established for the 2020-21 school year, replacing St. Joseph High School, which had operated since 1942 under the auspices of the Roman Catholic Diocese of Camden. The school is accredited by the Middle States Association of Colleges and Schools Commission on Elementary and Secondary Schools through December 2025; The school's accreditation status was extended for seven years in Fall 2018. In 2020, the former school permanently closed because of financial problems that were exacerbated by the coronavirus pandemic and the request from the Diocese of Camden.

As of the 2023–24 school year, the school had an enrollment of 168 students and 17.4 classroom teachers (on an FTE basis), for a student–teacher ratio of 9.7:1. The school's student body was 74.4% (125) White, 13.1% (22) Hispanic and 12.5% (21) Black.

== History ==
After being established in 1935 as a combination preparatory school and seminary, the high school was opened to all attendees in 1942.

The school had seen enrollment decline from 331 students in 2015 down to 206 in 2020, a 38% decline, and was carrying more than $6 million in debt.

In April 2020, the Diocese of Camden announced that, despite its status as a football powerhouse, St. Joseph was one of five Catholic schools in New Jersey which would close permanently at the end of the school year on June 30, 2020, due to financial problems caused by lack of sufficient enrollment in recent years and lack of community fundraising, which the school reliant on less significant diocesan and parish fundraising. An offer which was made by fundraisers in June 2020 to purchase the school facility was rejected by the Diocese of Camden.

Hammonton Public Schools acquired the building, which it leased to the independent St. Joseph Academy. The academy, which opened in 2020, is not affiliated with the diocese.

== Athletics ==
The St. Joseph Academy Wildcats compete in the National Division of the Cape-Atlantic League, an athletic conference comprised of public and private high schools located in Atlantic, Cape May, Cumberland, and Gloucester counties, that operates under the aegis of the New Jersey State Interscholastic Athletic Association. With 203 students in grades 10-12, the school was classified by the NJSIAA for the 2019–20 school year as Non-Public B for most athletic competition purposes, which included schools with an enrollment of 37 to 366 students in that grade range (equivalent to Group I for public schools). The football team competes in the Independence Division of the 94-team West Jersey Football League superconference and was classified by the NJSIAA as Non-Public Group B (equivalent to Group I/II for public schools) for football for 2024–2026, which included schools with 140 to 686 students.

St. Joseph's football team won 28 state championships in the playoff era that started in 1974, including in Non-Public B South in 1977 (awarded by NJSIAA), 1983, 1985 and 1989–1993; in Non-Public I in 1996, 1997, 1999–2002, 2004 and 2011–2015; in Non-Public II in 2003, 2005, 2006, 2009, 2017 and 2018; and in Non-Public I/II in 2010. The team won the 1985 South Jersey Group B state sectional title with a 33-8 win against Saint James High School in the championship game. The 1989 team won the Parochial B South title with a 19-0 win in the playoff final against three-time defending champion Bishop Eustace. The team won the Non-Public Group I title in 1996 with a 28-16 win in the championship game against Marist High School played at The College of New Jersey. The 2000 team won the Non-Public Group I title against St. Mary High School by a score of 47-7 in the championship game played at Kean University. The team finished at 10-1 in 2001 after winning the Non-Public Group I state title with a 49-0 victory against Immaculate Conception High School of Montclair in the playoff finals. The team won its seventh consecutive sectional title in 2015 with a 19–6 win against Hudson Catholic Regional High School in the Non-Public Group II playoff championship game. In 2017, the team finished the season with a 12–0 record and won the Non-Public Group II state championship with a 30–14 win against third-seeded Mater Dei High School in the tournament final; the victory was the program's eighth in nine seasons, the only exception being in 2016, when Mater Dei won its first state championship with a 26–0 win against St. Joseph. Though only dating to 2000, NJ.com ranked the "Holy War" rivalry between St. Joseph and Holy Spirit High School 11th on its list "Ranking the 31 fiercest rivalries in N.J. HS football", with St. Joseph winning 12 of the 18 games played through 2017. Head coach Paul Sacco finished the 2019 season with 20 state championships and an overall career record of 336-66-5 in his 39 years at St. Joseph, ranking him second in wins among active football coaches.

The field hockey team won the South Jersey Group I state sectional championship in 2003, 2005, 2010, 2012. Under Coach John DeMarco, the team had won the Cape Atlantic League title for over 16 years, while also winning five South Jersey Non-Public state titles, and also making three state championship appearances. In 2013, the team had a string of victories including beating both state powerhouses including Camden Catholic High School and Bishop Eustace Prep.

The wrestling team won the Non-Public B South state sectional championship in 1991, 1997, 1998 and 2006. The team won the Non-Public B state championship in 1998. The wrestling team won the Non-Public, South B sectional title in 2006 with a 45–31 win over Sacred Heart High School in the tournament final.

The softball team won the 2007 Non-Public South B state sectional championship with a string of shutout victories over Timothy Christian School (15-0) in the first round, St. Rose High School (6-0) n the semifinals and Gloucester Catholic High School (2-0) in the tournament final.

The boys track team won the Non-Public Group B spring / outdoor track state championship in 2011 and 2013-2015. The team won the South Jersey Non-Public B sectional title in 2011 for the first time in school history, edging the Pingry School by a single point after winning the 4x400-meter relay, the final event held at the meet. One week later, the boys won the state championship for the first time ever at South Plainfield High School.

== Teacher controversy ==
In June 2005, religion teacher and athletics coach Michael McColgan was arrested on charges brought against him in relation to child pornography traced back to his online account. Upon searching his home, authorities discovered dozens more images on his personal computer and also copied onto disk. McColgan pleaded guilty and was sentenced in a federal court in May 2006 to 48 months in prison for possession of child pornography.

== Notable alumni ==
- Tyler Bellamy (born 1988), defender, who played in the USL for the Ocean City Barons and Rochester Rhinos.
- Dave Calloway (born 1968), college basketball coach, who coached the NCAA Division I Monmouth Hawks men's basketball team.
- Kellyanne Conway (born 1967, class of 1985), senior counselor to president Donald Trump.
- J. D. DiRenzo (born 1998, class of 2017), American football offensive lineman for the Carolina Panthers
- Gordon Hill (born 1993), safety who played in the NFL for the San Diego Chargers.
- Rita Myers (born 1947, class of 1965), video installation artist.
- Brian E. Rumpf (born 1964), politician who has represented the 9th Legislative District in the New Jersey General Assembly since 2003.
- Max Valles (born 1994, class of 2012), defensive end, who played in the NFL for the Oakland Raiders and Buffalo Bills.
