= Saint Vincent Academy =

Catholic high school in Newark, New Jersey, United States

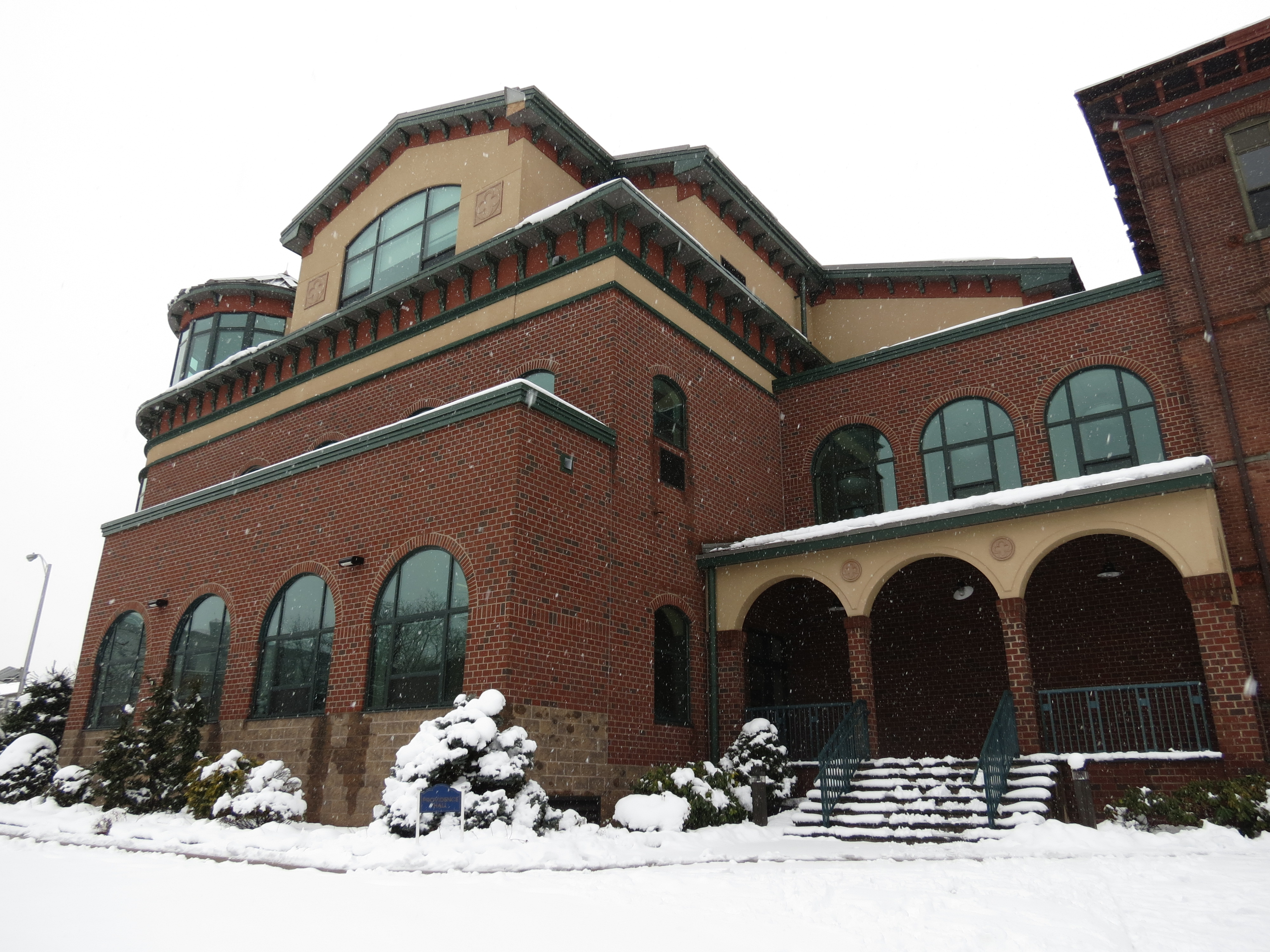

Location
- 228 West Market Street; Newark, Essex County, New Jersey 07103; United States; 40°44′36″N 74°11′14″W

Information
- Type: Private, All-Girls
- Motto: Classmate by Chance, Sister by Choice
- Religious affiliation: Roman Catholic Church
- Established: 1869
- Founder: Sisters of Charity
- Sister school: Saint Benedict's Preparatory School
- NCES School ID: 00861638
- President: Sister June Favata, SC
- Principal: Joan M. Tyburczy
- Student Services Director: Mary F. Nolan
- Faculty: 20.9 FTEs
- Grades: 9–12
- Enrollment: 197 (as of 2023–24)
- Student to teacher ratio: 9.4:1
- Campus type: Urban
- Colors: Blue and gold
- Athletics: 5 sports
- Athletics conference: North Jersey Catholic Girls League; Super Essex Conference (2009)
- Mascot: Panther
- Team name: Lady Panthers
- Accreditation: Middle States Association of Colleges and Schools
- Publication: Expressions (literary magazine)
- Newspaper: Connections
- Yearbook: Vincentian
- Tuition: $5,800 (2025–26)
- Athletic Director: Leanne Sleboda
- Website: www.svanj.org

Saint Vincent Academy (SVA), is a four-year, Catholic, college preparatory school for women located on West Market Street in Newark, New Jersey, United States. It operates under the supervision of the Sisters of Charity of Saint Elizabeth. The school has been accredited by the Middle States Association of Colleges and Schools Commission on Secondary School since 1990.

As of the 2023–24 school year, the school had an enrollment of 197 students and 20.9 classroom teachers (on an FTE basis), for a student–teacher ratio of 9.4:1.

== Background ==
The academy was founded in 1869 by the Sisters of Charity of Saint Elizabeth, and named for St. Vincent de Paul. Saint Vincent Academy currently holds the distinction of being the only private high school for women in the city of Newark in New Jersey. The current administrative team consists of Sister June Favata, S.C. Sr. Margaret Killough, S.C., and Ms. Mary F. Nolan. This school describes itself as having one of the highest graduation rates of any school in Newark and Essex County. schools located near Saint Vincent Academy include Science Park High School, Essex County College, American History High School, Saint Benedict's Preparatory School and Newark Arts High School.

== Athletics ==
The Saint Vincent Academy Panthers compete in the Super Essex Conference, which was established following a reorganization of sports leagues in Northern New Jersey by the New Jersey State Interscholastic Athletic Association (NJSIAA). With 366 students in grades 10-12, the school was classified by the NJSIAA for the 2019–20 school year as Non-Public B for most athletic competition purposes, which included schools with an enrollment of 37 to 366 students in that grade range (equivalent to Group II for public schools).
