= Bergen County Technical Schools =

County technical school district in Bergen County, New Jersey, US

Address
- 540 Farview Avenue Paramus, Bergen County, New Jersey, 07652; United States
- Coordinates: 40.956628°N 74.056933°W

District information
- Grades: Vocational
- Superintendent: Howard Lerner
- Business administrator: John Susino
- Schools: 5

Students and staff
- Enrollment: 2,449 (as of 2021–22)
- Faculty: 245.8 FTEs
- Student–teacher ratio: 10.0:1

Other information
- District Factor Group: NA
- Website: www.bergen.org/site/Default30cc.html
Ind.	Per pupil	District spending	Rank (*)	Vocational average	%± vs. average
1A	Total Spending	$33,685	21	$18,891	78.3%
1	Budgetary Cost	27,205	21	17,296	57.3%
2	Classroom Instruction	13,399	21	9,045	48.1%
6	Support Services	5,164	21	2,269	127.6%
8	Administrative Cost	2,847	14	2,353	21.0%
10	Operations & Maintenance	4,441	20	3,014	47.3%
13	Extracurricular Activities	877	18	464	89.0%
16	Median Teacher Salary	77,388	20	65,035
Data from NJDoE 2014 Taxpayers' Guide to Education Spending. *Of Vocational districts with any number of students. Lowest spending=1; Highest=21

Bergen County Technical Schools (BCTS) is a county technical school district that serves as the vocational / technical education arm of all the school districts within the 70 municipalities in Bergen County, in the U.S. state of New Jersey. The primary programs offered are the Bergen County Academies and Bergen County Technical High School. It has its headquarters in Paramus.

As of the 2021–22 school year, the district, composed of five schools, had an enrollment of 2,449 students and 245.8 classroom teachers (on an FTE basis), for a student–teacher ratio of 10.0:1.

== History ==
The district was established in 1942 and the initial trade courses were offered in Hackensack in 1942.

In 1995, the administration of the technical school district and the Bergen County Special Services School District were combined.

== Awards and recognition ==
In 2015, Bergen County Academies was one of 15 schools in New Jersey, and one of nine public schools, recognized as a National Blue Ribbon School in the exemplary high performing category by the United States Department of Education.

For the 1997-98 school year, the Academy for the Advancement of Science and Technology of Bergen County Academies was named a "Star School" by the New Jersey Department of Education, the highest honor that a New Jersey school can achieve.

== Schools ==
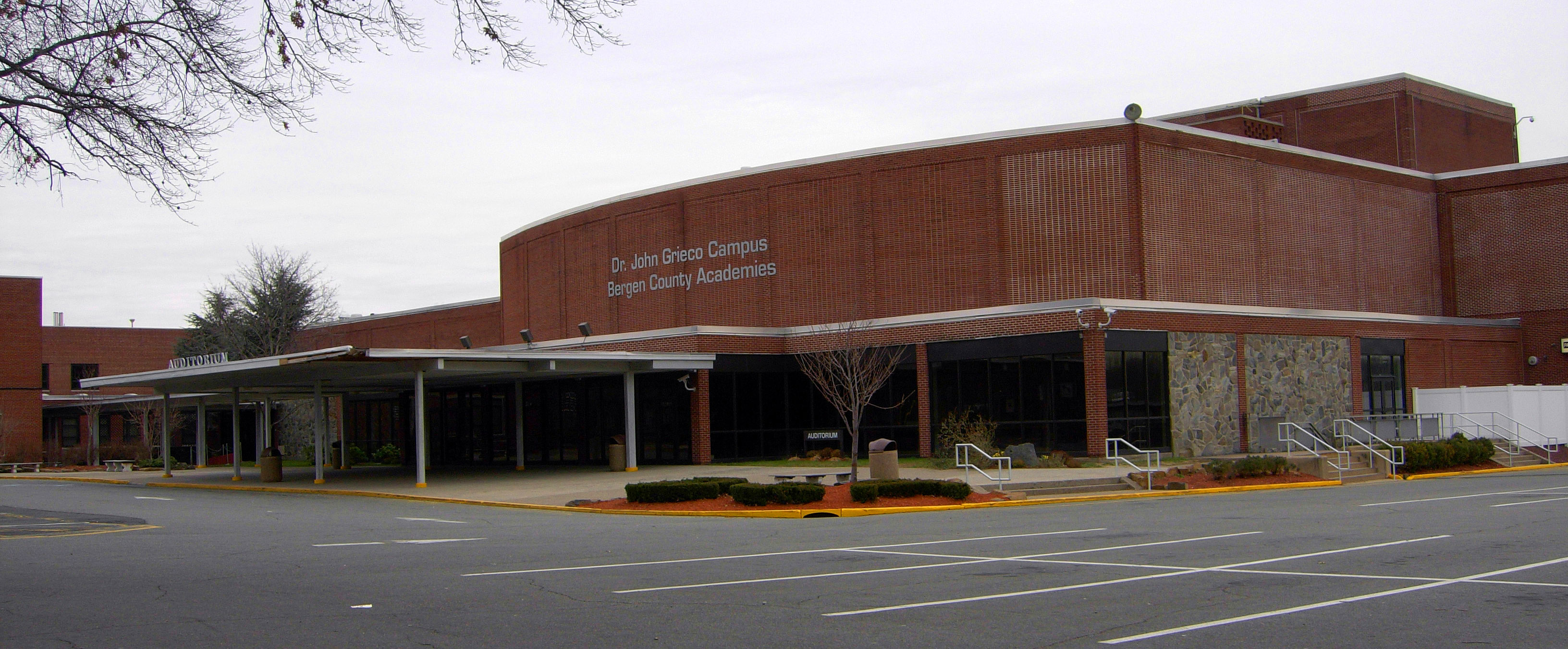
Bergen County Academies, Dr. John Grieco Campus

Schools in the district (with 2021–22 enrollment data from the National Center for Education Statistics) are:

- Applied Technology High School (with 273 students in grades 9-12) focuses and offers hands on experiences in the engineering, healthcare, and cybersecurity field in its facility at Bergen Community College in Paramus.
- Bergen County Academies, Dr. John Grieco Campus (1,109 students in grades 9-12) offers seven public magnet high school programs. The Academies prepare students to meet the academic rigors of college and the corporate world beyond through a blend of professional, technical and academic courses.
- Bergen County Technical High School, Paramus Campus (293 students in grades 9-12) is a shared-time vocational and technical training facility for Bergen County residents located in Paramus.
- Bergen County Technical High School, Teterboro Campus (678 students in grades 9-12) is a full-time public high school that provides a challenging, project-driven curriculum in a technology-infused environment. The curriculum is structured around a core of interdisciplinary technical and academic disciplines that prepare students for post-secondary education and career development work-based experiences.

== Athletics ==
Bergen Tech sports teams include athletes from all four campuses. The Bergen County Technical High School Knights now competes in the Big North Conference, following a reorganization of sports leagues in Northern New Jersey by the New Jersey State Interscholastic Athletic Association. In the 2009-10 school year, the school competed in the North Jersey Tri-County Conference, which was established on an interim basis to facilitate the realignment. Prior to the realignment, the teams had previously competed in the Northern New Jersey Interscholastic League (NNJIL), starting with the 2006-07 school year. With 1,571 students in grades 10-12, Bergen Tech was classified by the NJSIAA for the 2015-16 school year as North I, Group IV for most athletic competition purposes, which included schools with an enrollment of 1,090 to 2,568 students in that grade range.

In 2006, the Bergen Tech football team won their first NNJIL Division Championship. They also participated in the state playoffs for the first time in the school's history. They lost in the first round to Randolph High School by a score of 29-0.

In 2007, the girls' tennis team won the North I, Group IV state sectional championship with a 4-1 win over Ridgewood High School in the tournament finals. The win was the team's second consecutive title, and their third since 2003.

== Administration ==
Core members of the district's administration are:

- Howard Lerner, superintendent
- John Susino, business administrator and board secretary

== Board of education ==
The district's board of education is comprised of five members. Four of the members are appointed by the Bergen County Executive after confirmation by the Board of Commissioners, with each member serving a four-year term. The other member is the County Superintendent of Schools. The board appoints a superintendent to oversee the district's day-to-day operations and a business administrator to supervise the business functions of the district.
