= Super Essex Conference =

The Super Essex Conference (SEC) is a high school athletic conference located in Essex County, New Jersey. The conference was formed in 2009 by the New Jersey State Interscholastic Athletic Association and was a result of a larger realignment that swept through North Jersey. The Super Essex Conference was formed by all of Essex County's high schools, the majority of which either came from the NNJIL, Iron Hills, Northern Hills, or Colonial Hills conferences. Several schools were members of either the Mountain Valley or Watchung conferences, while several further were independent. The only school that did not participate was St. Benedict's Preparatory School, which is not part of the NJSIAA's jurisdiction.

== Divisions ==
The Super Essex Conference, has adopted a strength of program alignment that places all the stronger programs in the top division and the weaker programs in the lower division with schools moving up or down every two years based on performance. It's similar to the system used statewide for hockey and lacrosse.

== Member schools ==
School	Location	Team name	Colors	Prior Conference
Arts High School	Newark	Jaguars		Colonial Hills
Barringer High School	Newark	Blue Bears		NNJIL
Belleville High School	Belleville	Buccaneers		NNJIL
Bloomfield High School	Bloomfield	Bengals		NNJIL
Bloomfield Tech High School (defunct)	Bloomfield	Spartans		Independent
Cedar Grove High School	Cedar Grove	Panthers		Colonial Hills
Central High School	Newark	Blue Devils		Mountain Valley
Christ the King Prep (defunct)	Newark	Knights		
Columbia High School	Maplewood	Cougars		Iron Hills
East Orange Campus High School	East Orange	Jaguars		Iron Hills
East Side High School	Newark	Red Raiders		Watchung
Glen Ridge High School	Glen Ridge	Ridgers		Colonial Hills
Golda Och Academy (formerly Solomon Schechter)	West Orange	Roadrunners		Independent
Immaculate Conception High School	Montclair	Lions		Colonial Hills
Irvington High School	Irvington	Knights		Watchung
James Caldwell High School	West Caldwell	Chiefs		Northern Hills
Livingston High School	Livingston	Lancers		Iron Hills
Malcolm X Shabazz High School	Newark	Bulldogs		Watchung
Marylawn of the Oranges High School (defunct)	South Orange	Knights		
Millburn High School	Millburn	Millers		Northern Hills
Montclair High School	Montclair	Mounties		NNJIL
Montclair Kimberley Academy	Montclair	Cougars		Colonial Hills
Mount Saint Dominic Academy	Caldwell	Lady Lions		Northern Hills
Newark Academy	Livingston	Minutemen		Colonial Hills
Newark Collegiate Academy	Newark	Panthers		
Newark Tech High School	Newark	Terriers		Mountain Valley
North 13th Street Tech (defunct)	Newark	Cougars		
Nutley High School	Nutley	Maroon Raiders		NNJIL
Orange High School	Orange	Tornadoes		Northern Hills
Saint Vincent Academy	Newark	Panthers		
Science Park High School	Newark	Chargers		Colonial Hills
Seton Hall Prep	West Orange	Pirates		Iron Hills
Technology High School	Newark	Panthers		Colonial Hills
University High School	Newark	Phoenix		Colonial Hills
Verona High School	Verona	Hillbillies		Colonial Hills
Weequahic High School	Newark	Indians		Iron Hills
West Essex High School	North Caldwell	Knights		Iron Hills
West Orange High School	West Orange	Mountaineers		Northern Hills
West Side High School	Newark	Roughriders		Northern Hills
Donald M. Payne Tech High School	Newark	Lions		

== Recent Additions ==
For the 2011-2012 school year the conference added three new members in Christ the King Prep, Newark Tech High School, and North 13th Street Tech. All three schools are located in Newark, New Jersey.
