= Bergen County Technical High School, Paramus Campus =

High school in Bergen County, New Jersey, US

Bergen County Technical High School - Paramus Campus

Location
- 285 Pascack Road; Paramus, Bergen County, New Jersey 07652; United States
- Coordinates: 40.959763°N 74.059929°W

Information
- Type: Technical Public high school
- School district: Bergen County Technical Schools
- NCES School ID: 340147000252
- Principal: Jeremy Wertheim
- Faculty: 46.0 FTEs
- Grades: 9–12
- Enrollment: 288 (as of 2024–25)
- Student to teacher ratio: 6.3:1
- Colors: Black; Gold
- Athletics conference: Big North Conference
- Team name: Knights
- Website: www.bergen.org/bcthspc

Bergen County Technical High School, Paramus Campus is a tuition-free public magnet high school in Paramus, serving students in Bergen County, in the U.S. state of New Jersey. The school is part of the Bergen County Technical Schools, which also includes Bergen County Academies in Hackensack and the Bergen County Technical High School, Teterboro Campus.

As of the 2024–25 school year, the school had an enrollment of 288 students and 46.0 classroom teachers (on an FTE basis), for a student–teacher ratio of 6.3:1. There were 86 students (29.9% of enrollment) eligible for free lunch and 15 (5.2% of students) eligible for reduced-cost lunch.

== Athletics ==
The school offers various sports, where students play together with the other campuses of the Bergen County Technical Schools district under one consolidated set of teams. The boys' teams, called the Bergen Tech Knights, and the girls' teams, the Bergen Tech Lady Knights, compete in the Big North Conference, which is comprised of public and private high schools in Bergen and Passaic counties, and was established following a reorganization of the Northern New Jersey sports leagues by the New Jersey State Interscholastic Athletic Association. In the 2009–2010 school year, the school competed in the North Jersey Tri-County Conference, which was established on an interim basis to facilitate the realignment. Before the realignment, Bergen Tech had been placed in the Northern New Jersey Interscholastic League (NNJIL) at the start of the Fall 2006 athletic season. With 1,669 students in grades 10-12, the school was classified by the NJSIAA for the 2019–20 school year as Group IV for most athletic competition purposes, which included schools with an enrollment of 1,060 to 5,049 students in that grade range. The school was classified by the NJSIAA as Group V North for football for 2024–2026, which included schools with 1,317 to 5,409 students. Sports offered include: cross country, football, soccer, tennis, volleyball, cheerleading, basketball, bowling, indoor track, fencing, baseball, golf, lacrosse, softball, and track & field. Students who wish to play a high school sport that is not offered can make accommodations with their town of residence, as appropriate.

== Administration ==
The school's principal is Jeremy Wertheim. His core administration team includes two vice principals.
