= Technology High School (New Jersey) =

High school in Newark County, New Jersey, US

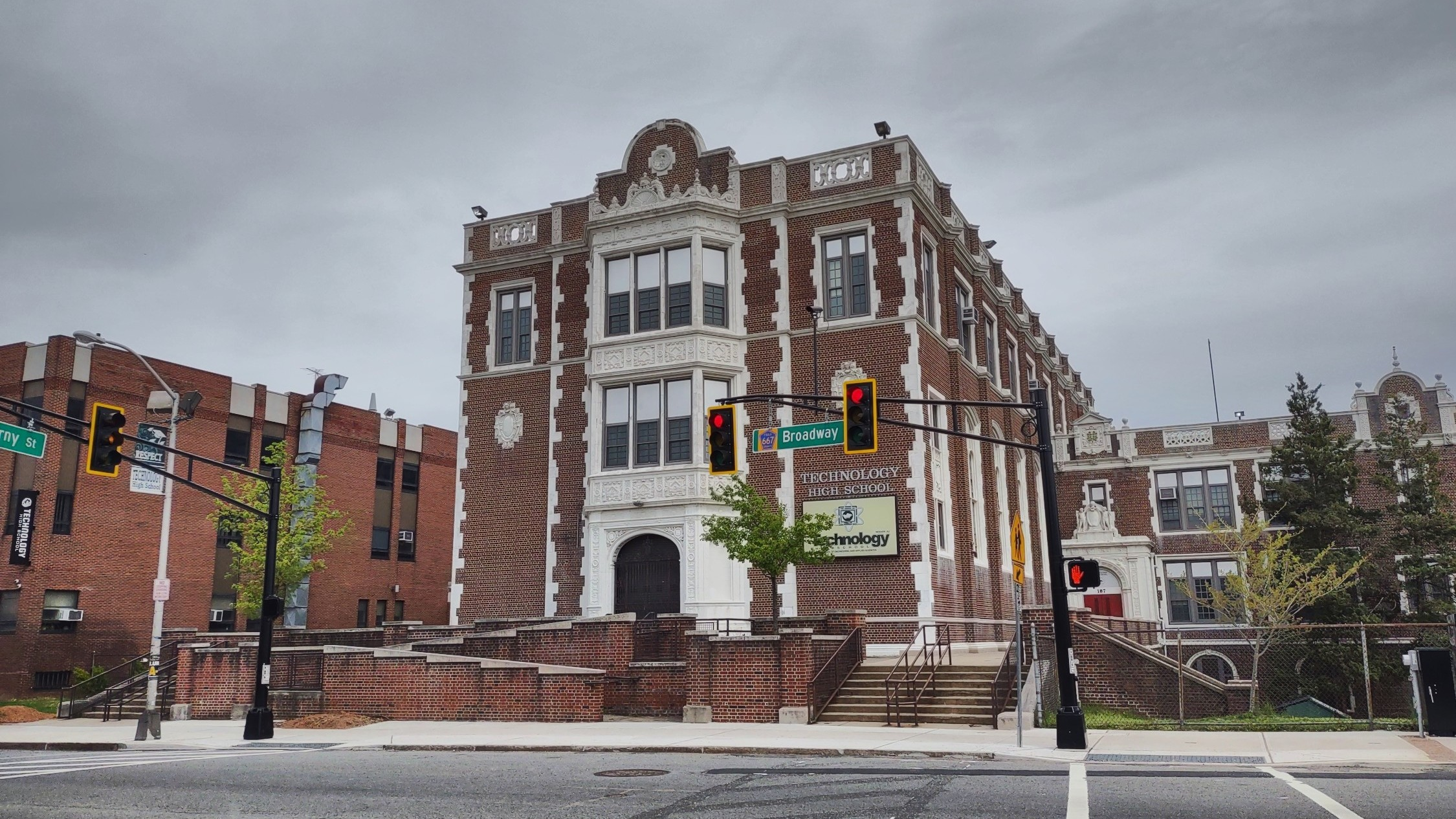

Location
- 187 Broadway; Newark, Essex County, New Jersey 07104; United States; 40.7574°N 74.1691°W

Information
- Type: Magnet public high school
- Established: 1996
- School district: Newark Public Schools
- NCES School ID: 341134000139
- Principal: Edwin Reyes
- Faculty: 48.5 FTEs
- Grades: 9-12
- Enrollment: 654 (as of 2023–24)
- Student to teacher ratio: 13.5:1
- Campus: Urban
- Colors: Black and silver
- Team name: Panthers
- Website: www.nps.k12.nj.us/TEC/

Technology High School is a magnet public high school serving students in ninth through twelfth grades, located in the Broadway neighborhood in Newark, New Jersey's north ward. The school was integrated into the Newark Public School system in 1996 after formerly serving as a Newark State Teachers College (now Kean University) and the Center of Occupations and Education Development (COED) and is located in a building designed by the architectural firm of Guilbert and Betelle in 1913.

As of the 2023–24 school year, the school had an enrollment of 654 students and 48.5 classroom teachers (on an FTE basis), for a student–teacher ratio of 13.5:1. There were 439 students (67.1% of enrollment) eligible for free lunch and 82 (12.5% of students) eligible for reduced-cost lunch.

== Awards, recognition and rankings ==
In 2023, Technology High School was one of nine schools in New Jersey that was recognized as a National Blue Ribbon School by the United States Department of Education.

The school was the 199th-ranked public high school in New Jersey out of 339 schools statewide in New Jersey Monthly magazine's September 2014 cover story on the state's "Top Public High Schools", using a new ranking methodology. The school had been ranked 190th in the state of 328 schools in 2012, after being ranked 156th in 2010 out of 322 schools listed.

Schooldigger.com ranked the school tied for 120th out of 381 public high schools statewide in its 2011 rankings (a decrease of 49 positions from the 2010 ranking) which were based on the combined percentage of students classified as proficient or above proficient on the mathematics (85.0%) and language arts literacy (95.6%) components of the High School Proficiency Assessment (HSPA).

== Athletics ==
The Technology High School Panthers compete in the Super Essex Conference, which is comprised of public and private high schools in Essex County and was established following a reorganization of sports leagues in Northern New Jersey by the New Jersey State Interscholastic Athletic Association (NJSIAA). Prior to the 2010 realignment, the school had participated in the Mountain Valley Conference. With 449 students in grades 10-12, the school was classified by the NJSIAA for the 2019–20 school year as Group I for most athletic competition purposes, which included schools with an enrollment of 75 to 476 students in that grade range. The school's main rivalry is with Science Park High School.

== Courses ==
9th grade	10th grade	11th grade	12th grade
Art or Music	Geometry or Honors Geometry	Ethics/Financial Literacy	Elective (a)
Intro to Engineering	1st year of Cluster- 1 period (b)	2nd year of Cluster- 2 periods (b)	3rd year of Cluster- 2 periods (b)
English I or Honors English I	English II	English III or AP English Language	English IV or AP English Literature
Algebra I or Honors Algebra I	Algebra II or Honors Algebra II	Pre-Calculus or Honors Pre-Calculus	Calculus, ECC Math or AP Calculus AB
Physics	Chemistry (AP Physics) (c)	Biology (AP Chemistry) (c)	Forensics (AP Biology) (c)
Physical Education/Health I	Physical Education/Health II	Physical Education/Health III and Drivers Ed (1 quarter)	Physical Education/Health IV
Spanish/French I	Spanish/French II		(AP Spanish as Elective)
World History	US History I	US History II	African American History

a. Possible electives for Seniors: ECC Criminal Justice/Sociology/Psychology, Journalism, Drama, AP Spanish, or Cooking.

b. Cluster Course choices are: Computer Science (AP Computer Science in 12th grade), Office Systems, Pathways to Engineering, CISCO Networking, Graphic Design, Bio-medical Science, CADD/Architecture, and HVAC.

c. Science courses in parentheses can be taken (not required) alongside the other course listed. Example: Sophomores who choose AP Physics would also take Chemistry.

Note: By senior year, students will have completed 4 or 5 years of Math, 4 or 5 years of Science, 4 years of English, 4 years of Health/Phys Ed, 2 or 3 years of a foreign language, 3 years of their cluster, 1 year of Ethics/Financial Literacy, and possible 1 year of an elective.

== Administration ==
The school's principal is Edwin Reyes. His core administration team includes two vice principals.

== Notable alumni ==
- Kenneth Faried (born 1989, class of 2007), basketball player for the Denver Nuggets who is the NCAA Division I modern era's all-time leading rebounder
