= Newark Collegiate Academy =

Charter school in Newark, New Jersey, United States

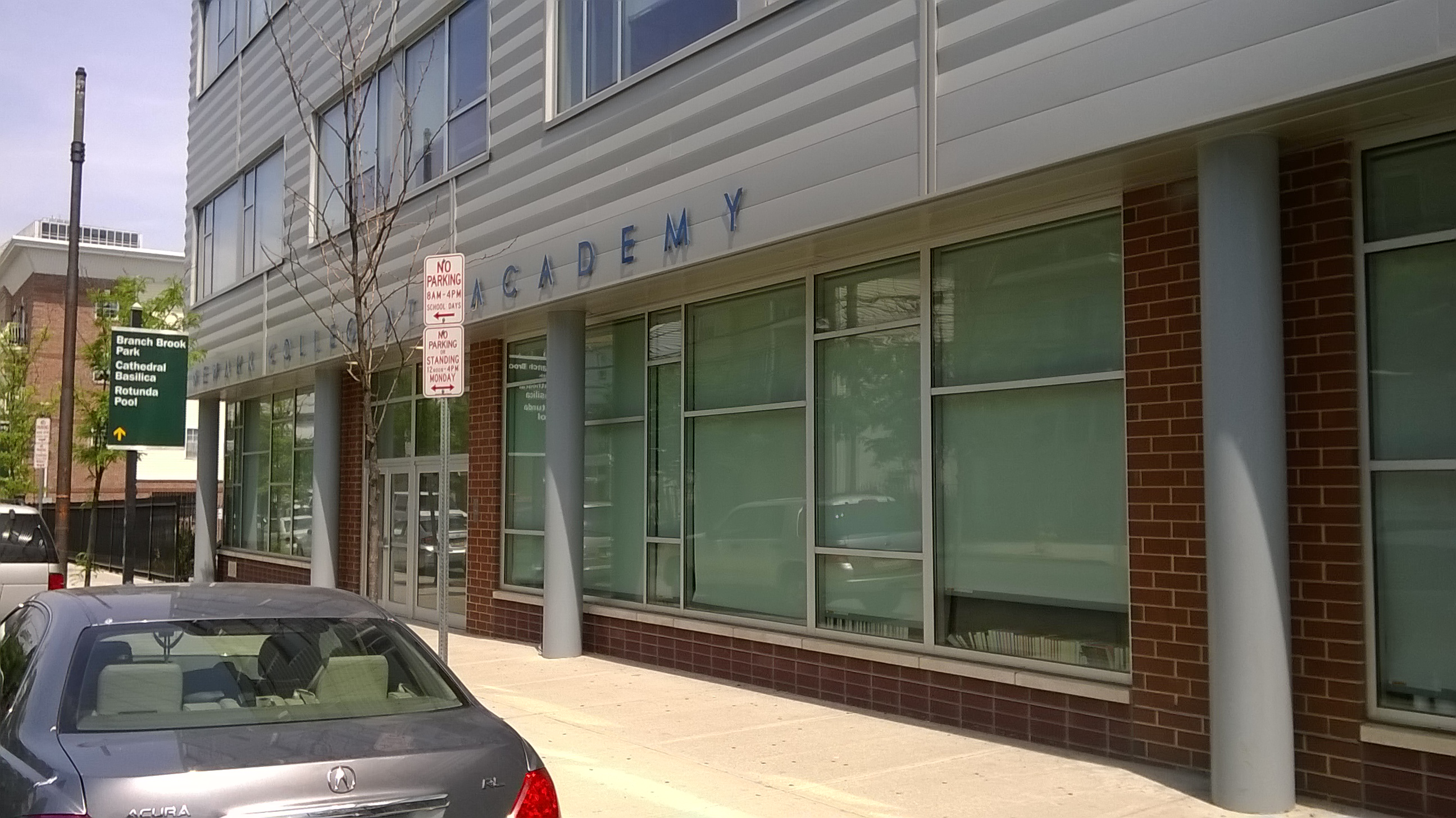

Location
- 129 Littleton Avenue; Newark, Essex County, New Jersey 07103; United States
- 40.732333°N 74.174577°W

Information
- Type: Charter high school
- Motto: "At Newark Collegiate Academy we develop our habits of mind and character, preparing to lead principled, productive lives, that kindle a respect for Human dignity."
- Established: 2007
- Authority: Knowledge Is Power Program (KIPP)
- NCES School ID: 340007000529
- Principal: Bridgett Hitchings; Lindsay Schambach; Sean Larry Stevens
- Faculty: 270.0 FTEs
- Grades: 9-12
- Enrollment: 6,096 (as of 2022–23)
- Student to teacher ratio: 22.6:1
- Colors: Navy Blue; Sky Blue white
- Slogan: "Work Hard Be Nice."
- Athletics conference: Super Essex Conference (general); North Jersey Super Football Conference (football)
- Sports: Football, Soccer, Basketball, Track and Field, Majorette, Cheerleading, and Boys and Girls Volleyball
- Team name: Panthers
- Website: School website

Newark Collegiate Academy (NCA) is a four-year charter public high school located in Newark in Essex County, in the U.S. state of New Jersey, operating as part of the TEAM Academy Charter School network of charter schools in Newark run by the Knowledge Is Power Program (KIPP) which serves students in kindergarten through twelfth grade. NCA opened in August 2007 with plans to ultimately serve over 570 students, mostly matriculating from TEAM's middle schools, Rise and TEAM Academies.

As of the 2022–23 school year, the school had an enrollment of 6,096 students and 270.0 classroom teachers (on an FTE basis), for a student–teacher ratio of 22.6:1. There were 4,596 students (75.4% of enrollment) eligible for free lunch and 805 (13.2% of students) eligible for reduced-cost lunch.

== Awards, recognition and rankings ==
The school was the 288th-ranked public high school in New Jersey out of 339 schools statewide in New Jersey Monthly magazine's September 2014 cover story on the state's "Top Public High Schools".

== Athletics ==
The Newark Collegiate Academy Panthers compete in the Super Essex Conference, which consists of public and private high schools in Essex County and was established following a reorganization of sports leagues in Northern New Jersey under the auspices of the New Jersey State Interscholastic Athletic Association (NJSIAA). With 552 students in grades 10-12, the school was classified by the NJSIAA for the 2019–20 school year as Group II for most athletic competition purposes, which included schools with an enrollment of 486 to 758 students in that grade range. The football team competes in the National White division of the North Jersey Super Football Conference, which includes 112 schools competing in 20 divisions, making it the nation's biggest football-only high school sports league. The school was classified by the NJSIAA as Group II North for football for 2024–2026, which included schools with 484 to 683 students.

School colors are navy blue and white. Sports offered by the school include volleyball (women), basketball (men), basketball (women), cross country (men), cross country (women), football, soccer (women), soccer (men), track and field spring (men), track and field spring (women), track and field winter (men) and track and field winter (women).
