= Northern Hills Conference =

The Northern Hills Conference, was an athletic conference of nineteen private and public high schools located in Essex, Morris and Passaic counties in Northern New Jersey.

There were nineteen member Northern Hills Conference schools, split into two divisions: Skyline and Suburban. The uneven number resulted from Passaic County Technical Institute's joining the conference; the school, long a member of the Bergen-Passaic Scholastic League, left that conference to join the Northern Hills after years of being the only Group IV school in a conference made up largely of Group I and Group II schools.

The conference was split up as a result of the realignment of conferences by the New Jersey State Interscholastic Athletic Association. The Passaic County schools joined the Big North Conference with members of the North Bergen Interscholastic Athletic League and the former Northern New Jersey Interscholastic League schools that were in Passaic and Bergen County. The Essex County schools joined with the schools in the Iron Hills, Colonial Hills, NNJIL, and Watchung Conferences from the same county to form the Super Essex Conference. The Morris County schools joined with members of the Iron Hills Conference and the Sussex County Interscholastic League to form the Northwest Jersey Athletic Conference.

== Skyline Division ==
| School | Location | School District | Team Name | Colors | Classification | Current Conference |
| Mount Saint Dominic Academy | Caldwell | | Lions | | Non-Public North A |
| Orange High School | Orange | Orange Board of Education | Tornadoes | Orange/ Black | North II, Group II | Super Essex Conference |
| Passaic County Technical Institute | Wayne | | Bulldogs | Blue/ White | North I, Group IV | Big North Conference |
| Passaic Valley Regional High School | Little Falls | Passaic Valley Regional High School | Hornets | Green/ White | North II, Group III | Big North Conference |
| Wayne Valley High School | Wayne | Wayne Public Schools | Indians | Blue/ White | North I, Group III | Big North Conference |
| West Milford High School | West Milford | West Milford Township Public Schools | Highlanders | Black/ Gold | North I, Group III | Big North Conference |
| West Orange High School | West Orange | West Orange Public Schools | Mountaineers | Navy/ White | North I, Group IV | Super Essex Conference |
| West Side High School | Newark | Newark Public Schools | Roughriders | Green/ White | North II, Group III | Super Essex Conference |

== Suburban Division ==
| School | Location | School District | Team Name | Colors | Classification | Current Conference |
| Butler High School | Butler | Butler Public Schools | Bulldogs | Royal Blue/ Gold | North I, Group I | Northwest Jersey Athletic Conference |
| James Caldwell High School | West Caldwell | Caldwell-West Caldwell Public Schools | Chiefs | Royal Blue/ White | North II, Group II | Super Essex Conference |
| Delbarton School (Boys) | Morris Township | | Green Wave | Green/ White | Non-Public North A | Northwest Jersey Athletic Conference |
| DePaul Catholic High School | Wayne | | Spartans | Green/ White | Non-Public North A | Big North Conference |
| Madison High School | Madison | Madison Public Schools | Dodgers | Maroon/ White/ Gold | North II, Group II | Northwest Jersey Athletic Conference |
| Millburn High School | Millburn | Millburn Township Public Schools | Millers | Royal/ White | North II, Group III | Super Essex Conference |
| Montville Township High School | Montville | Montville Township School District | Mustangs | Green/ White | North 2, Group II | Northwest Jersey Athletic Conference |
| Pequannock Township High School | Pequannock Township | Pequannock Township School District | Golden Panthers | Navy Blue/ Gold | North I, Group II | Northwest Jersey Athletic Conference |
| Academy of Saint Elizabeth (Girls) | Convent Station | | Panthers | Blue/ Gold | Non-Public North A |
| Villa Walsh Academy (Girls) | Morristown | | Vikings | Green/ White | Non-Public North B |
| Lakeland Regional High School | Wanaque | Lakeland Regional High School | Lancers | Red/Gray | North I, Group III | Big North Conference |
