= Seton Hall Preparatory School =

Private high school in Essex County, New Jersey, US

Location
- 120 Northfield Avenue; West Orange, New Jersey 07052; United States; 40°46′30″N 74°14′52″W

Information
- Type: Private
- Motto: Hazard Zet Forward (No matter the risk, keep moving forward)
- Religious affiliation: Roman Catholic
- Patron saint: St. Elizabeth Ann Seton
- Established: 1856
- NCES School ID: 00864184
- President: Michael Kelly '57
- Headmaster: Michael Gallo '79
- Faculty: 78.5 FTEs
- Grades: 9–12
- Gender: Boys
- Student to teacher ratio: 12.5:1
- Campus: Suburban
- Campus size: 55 acres (220,000 m^{2})
- Colors: Royal Blue and white
- Athletics conference: Super Essex Conference (general); North Jersey Super Football Conference (football)
- Mascot: Pirate
- Nickname: SHP or The Prep
- Team name: Pirates
- Rivals: Delbarton School
- Accreditation: Middle States Association of Colleges and Schools
- Publication: Spectrum (literary magazine)
- Newspaper: The Pirate
- Yearbook: Tower
- School fees: $1,450
- Tuition: $24,200 (2025–26)
- Affiliation: Roman Catholic Archdiocese of Newark; New Jersey Association of Independent Schools
- Website: shp.org

Seton Hall Preparatory School, generally called Seton Hall Prep, SHP, or "The Prep", is a Roman Catholic all boys' high school located in the suburban community of West Orange in Essex County, in the U.S. state of New Jersey, operating under the supervision of the Archdiocese of Newark. Founded in 1856 with an original enrollment of five boys, Seton Hall Prep was originally located on the campus of Seton Hall University, where it became commonly known as "The Prep" as a way to distinguish it from "The University." In 1985, the school moved to its present location which was, at the time, West Orange High School. Seton Hall is the oldest Catholic college preparatory school in New Jersey.

As of the 2023–24 school year, the school had an enrollment of 981 students and 78.5 classroom teachers (on an FTE basis), for a student–teacher ratio of 12.5:1.

Seton Hall students follow a college preparatory program, with four-year requirements in the English language, mathematics, and theology. After completing a traditional core program during the first two years, students may establish a curriculum geared to their college and career plans from a wide selection of courses in science, history, language, fine arts, English and physical education. Seton Hall plans to offer college-level Advanced Placement (AP) courses in 26 areas during the 2019–20 school year.

"The Prep" is accredited by the Middle States Association of Colleges and Schools Commission on Elementary and Secondary Schools and is a member of the New Jersey Association of Independent Schools.

== History ==
Founded in 1856, Seton Hall Preparatory School is the oldest Catholic college preparatory school in New Jersey.

Bishop James Roosevelt Bayley, first Bishop of Newark and nephew of Elizabeth Ann Seton, purchased an estate in Madison, New Jersey using money donated by Catholic charities that would become the site of Seton Hall Prep. Five priests and eight laymen formed a Board of Directors to establish a Catholic preparatory school, college, and seminary. The inaugural class of five students first met on December 1, 1856.

Seton Hall President Rt. Rev. Bernard McQuaid purchased an estate in South Orange in 1857, to which the school moved in 1860 to accommodate a larger student body. The Prep would spend the next 125 years on the institution's South Orange campus.

Until 1928, the President of Seton Hall College was also the head of the Preparatory Division. At that time, Rev. D.A. Mulcahy became the high school's first director. The following year, Rev. William Bradley was named director, then principal, and ultimately the school's first headmaster in 1938.

The prep school's population grew further over the next decades, with peaks in enrollment during World War II and in the mid 1970s. The school occupied three main buildings on the university campus: Mooney Hall, Duffy Hall, and Stafford Hall. A significant portion of the student body lived on campus until the last of the boarding students graduated in the mid-1950s.

In the early and mid twentieth century Prep drew its students principally from Essex and Union counties, but as the state's transportation system expanded in the 1960s and 1970s, the school began to draw students from Morris, Bergen, Hudson, Passaic and Middlesex counties. This led to growth in the number of students attending the school — in 1975, enrollment surpassed 1,100.

In 1980, Rev. Michael E. Kelly became the first alumnus headmaster. Five years later, the Prep acquired an 11-acre (45,000 m^{2}) campus of its own in nearby West Orange.

Expansion continued to be a priority for the Prep as the 21st century arrived. In 1993, the school purchased a 44-acre (180,000 m^{2}) tract of land on nearby Prospect Avenue, overlooking the New York City skyline. Seton Hall Prep broke ground for construction of the Edward D. and Helen M. Kelly Athletic Complex (KAC) on this site in 1999. The project would span several years; the final phase of construction would not begin until 2014. In 2013, the John J. Murphy '52 Science Center was opened, adding a new wing of classrooms and science labs to the school.

In 2014, Rev. Kelly became the school's first president. Rev. Msgr. Robert Harahan was appointed headmaster in his place. In 2015, as the now-open KAC was being completed, the school celebrated its 160th anniversary.

In 2019, alum Michael Gallo, class of 1979, was appointed as the first lay headmaster.

== Prep life ==
The Prep offers a co-curricular activities program, with numerous academic, service, performance, cultural, publication, and recreation clubs and activities. Additionally, the Prep offers 16 varsity sports, most with accompanying sub-varsity level teams. The school reports that around 70% of its students participate in athletics at some point during their time at The Prep. The main campus, accessible to Interstate 280 and several bus and train routes, is augmented by a nearby 44-acre (180,000 m^{2}) site, the Kelly Athletic Complex (KAC), providing auxiliary athletic facilities, including a 400m all-weather track, a game field for lacrosse and soccer, and practice fields.

== Demographics ==
The students attending Seton Hall Prep hail from several New Jersey counties, and some have even lived in Staten Island and New York City during their time at the school. The Prep draws its student population from points as far as Jamesburg and Edison, to Chester and Denville, to Lyndhurst and Montville, to Pompton Plains and Kinnelon as well as Paterson and Hoboken. At the same time more than 80 students come from West Orange itself, 75 from neighboring South Orange/Maplewood and East Orange, and large contingents from close by Bloomfield, Cedar Grove, The Caldwells, Verona, Morristown, Florham Park, East Hanover, Summit, Livingston and Morris Plains.

== Extracurricular activities ==
The Prep offers many activities. Most students are involved in some after-school program. Some of these clubs are as follows.

- Performing Arts — Band, Big Band, Brass/Wind Ensemble, C-Tonians A Cappella Group, Fall Drama, Jazz Band, Music Ministry, Spring Musical, Stations of the Cross.
- Interscholastic Competition Clubs — Chess Club, Forensics/Debate, Math Team, Mock Trial, Model UN Team, Quiz Bowl, Robotics Team, Stock Market Club.
- Student Organizations — Ambassadors, Gregory Elementary School/Hazel Avenue Elementary School Tutoring Program, Kairos, Math Honor Society, National Honor Society, Peer Leadership, Chinese National Honor Society, Italian Honor Society, National Latin Honor Society, Spanish Honor Society, Student Council.
- Publishing — Pirate (School Newspaper), Spectrum (Literary Publication), Tower (Yearbook).
- Recreational Activity Clubs — Aerospace Club, Aquarium Society, Car Club, Cinema Club, Fishing Club, Guitar Club, Martial Arts Club, Museums Club, Ping Pong Club, SHP Eagles Club, Ski/Snowboard Club, Sports Analytics Club, Video Game Club.
- Science Clubs — Engineering Club, Environmental Club.
- Culture Clubs — Chinese Club, Gaelic Society, Italian Club, Japanese Club, Spanish Club, West Indian Organization.
- Service Organizations — Autism Big Brothers, Eucharistic Ministry, Knights of Setonia, Operation Smile, Service Club, Wounded Warrior Project.
- Career Clubs — Future Business Leaders of America, Future Lawyers Club, Future Medical Leaders.
- Political Organizations — Conservative Society, Democratic Society, Free Thinkers Society.
- Athletic Organizations — Pirate Nation, Seton Hall Prep Network (SHPN).

In 1958–59, 1964–66, and again in 1968, the school's chess team was the New Jersey high school team champion, winning the Father Casimir J. Finley Trophy.

Most of the school's clubs are run almost entirely by students. A notable example is SHPN, a sports news and information network dedicated to the coverage of Prep athletics. Founded by four seniors in 2016, The students involved with the club have produced highlight videos and even full-length documentary vlogs chronicling the successes and failures of the school's athletic program.

=== Athletics ===
The Seton Hall Prep Pirates compete in the Super Essex Conference, which is comprised of public and private high schools in the county and was established following a reorganization of sports leagues in Northern New Jersey by the New Jersey State Interscholastic Athletic Association (NJSIAA). Prior to the NJSIAA's 2010 realignment, the school had competed as part of the Iron Hills Conference, which included public and private high schools in Essex, Morris and Union counties. With 1,454 students in grades 10-12, the school was classified by the NJSIAA for the 2019–20 school year as Non-Public A for most athletic competition purposes, which included schools with an enrollment of 381 to 1,454 students in that grade range (equivalent to Group II for public schools). The football team competes in the Patriot Blue division of the North Jersey Super Football Conference, which includes 112 schools competing in 20 divisions, making it the nation's biggest football-only high school sports league. The school was classified by the NJSIAA as Non-Public Group A (equivalent to Group III/IV/V for public schools) for football for 2024–2026, which included schools with 738 to 1,404 students.

==== Football ====
Seton Hall Prep's football program was its first sport that was run without influence from the university. After gaining independence following the 1907 season, the team, often referred to as "The Olympians," was disbanded and replaced by a rugby team. Football returned to the Prep in 1912 and has remained in place ever since.

In 1926, the Prep shut out St. Benedict's on their way to their first ever championship — the fittingly named Catholic Prep School Championship. Twenty years later, newly appointed headmaster Rev. William J. Duffy brought substantial changes to the Prep's entire athletic program. Faced with an unheard of enrollment of 1,300 students, Rev. Duffy banned postgraduates from competing for any of Seton Hall Prep's teams. As a result of the upheaval that followed, several new coaches were brought into the program, including Anthony J. Verducci in 1950.

In the playoff era that started in 1974, the football team has won the Non-Public A North state sectional championship in 1974 (awarded by the NJSIAA), and won the playoffs in 1976-1978, 1981 and 1985.

In 1954, Verducci became head coach, a position that he would hold until 1988. His tenure was highlighted by 11 of the Prep's 12 NJSIAA Parochial A North championships and seven undefeated seasons. 1976–77 was perhaps the best season in program history, as the team finished 11–0 for the first time in school history and won the first of three straight state championships, having shut out their opponents eight times that season.

The 1977 team finished the season with a 10–0–1 record and outscored their opponents 290–6, including a state record ten shutouts, among them a 15–0 win over Bergen Catholic in the state championship game. The Prep was undefeated again in 1978, as Verducci finished with an 11-0 record and extended his winning streak to 38 games with a 22-10 win against Bergen Catholic in the Parochial A North championship game. The Pirates surrendered only 72 points in their three consecutive championship seasons. Verducci would retire with a 214-75-16 record, including 104 shutouts.

The 1981 team finished the season with an 11-0 record after winning the Parochial A North title with a 20-12 defeat of Bergen Catholic High School in the championship game.

The Pirates' best season since Verducci's retirement came 1997–98, when they went 10–1, losing only to St. Joe's of Montvale in the Parochial A title game. In 2005, the team started 0–2 before winning their next eight games, losing the state championship game to powerhouse Don Bosco.

Former Prep players who reached the NFL include John Schmitt, Chet Parlavecchio, Stanley Anthony "Tony" Woods, and Jarrod Johnson.

==== Baseball ====
Seton Hall Prep currently has 30 state baseball championships, including 15 in a 17-year period between 1948 and 1964. The baseball team won the Non-Public Group A North state championship in 1959-1962, 1964, 1969 and 1970, and won the Non-Public Group A state championship in 1971 (defeating Holy Cross High School in the tournament final), 1995 (vs. Paul VI High School), 2001 (vs. Christian Brothers Academy), 2003 (vs. Christian Brothers), 2005 (vs. Christian Brothers), 2006 (vs. Bishop Ahr High School), 2007 (vs. St. Joseph High School of Metuchen) and 2016 (vs. Saint Augustine Preparatory School). The program's eight state group titles are tied for second-most in the state. The 1971 team won the Parochial A title with a6-1 win against Holy Cross in the tournament final.

The 2003 team finished the season with a 30-1 record after tying the game with three runs in the bottom of the seventh and scoring the winning run in the 11th to defeat Christian Brothers by a score of 6-5 in the Parochial A championship game.

Following the 2007 season, the Pirates were ranked as the top team in the country by a number of media outlets. They were led by pitcher Rick Porcello, who was considered by some to be the best high school prospect in the country, ahead of future MLB all-stars such as Jason Heyward and Madison Bumgarner. Porcello was selected by the Detroit Tigers as the 27th pick overall in the first round of the 2007 Major League Baseball draft. He signed a contract with the Tigers in August for $7 million, the richest deal ever for a high school player. In its May 28, 2007 update, Baseball America ranked Seton Hall Prep third in the country, the only New Jersey school on its Top 50 ranking. The team won the North A state sectional championship with a 3–0 shutout of Immaculata High School in the tournament final. They would later win the North A state championship with a 10–1 win against St. Joseph High School. Porcello would go on to pitch for the Tigers and the Boston Red Sox, with whom he won the 2016 American League Cy Young Award.

Porcello is not the only former Pirate to be drafted by a major league team. In 2003, second baseman Eric Duncan was selected in the first round by the New York Yankees. Like Porcello, Duncan was considered one of the country's best high school prospects and was taken 27th overall. Another pitcher on the 2007 team, Evan Danieli, was selected by the Minnesota Twins in the 33rd round in 2007; he opted to attend Notre Dame instead of signing and was later drafted in the 24th round of the 2010 draft by the Atlanta Braves. Other draftees include students who graduated in 1969, 1983, 2001 (Joe Martinez), 2009, 2011, 2012 and 2015.

The team won the Greater Newark Tournament in 1971, 1983, 1990, 1997-2000, 2003, 2005, 2007, 2008 and 2013-2017. The program's 17 titles are the most in tournament history. The team won the 2017 Greater Newark Tournament title won the program's fifth straight championship, defeating Nutley High School 4-2 in the finals.

==== Basketball ====
Seton Hall Prep was a basketball powerhouse for many years, winning the Iron Hills Conference title 20 consecutive times before joining the Super Essex Conference in 2010. The Pirates have won 14 Non-Public A state titles. The team has only had three head coaches since 1948: Frank "Finn" Tracey, Prep legend Bob Farrell, and current head coach Kevin Williams.

The boys' basketball team won the Non-Public Group A state title in 1961 (defeating runner-up Trenton Catholic High School in the tournament final), 1964 (vs. St. Joseph's High School of Camden), 1986 (vs. Christian Brothers Academy), 1991 (vs. McCorristin Catholic High School), 1992 (vs. St. Joseph High School of Metuchen), 1993 (vs. Camden Catholic High School), 1996 (vs. Camden Catholic), 1997 (vs. Eustace Preparatory School), 1998 (vs. St. Joseph of Metuchen), 1999 (vs. St. Joseph of Metuchen), 2000 (vs. Christian Brothers), 2005 (vs. Christian Brothers), 2006 (vs. Christian Brothers) and 2007 (vs. Christian Brothers). The program's 14 state titles are tied for second-most in the state. The team was the 2005 Non-Public North A state sectional champion, defeating Saint Joseph Regional High School, 63–54 in the final game. The team went on to win the state championship and the 2005 Tournament of Champions, with a 63–60 win over St. Patrick's High School, in a game played at Continental Airlines Arena. This would be the Pirates' second TOC victory, with the other triumph occurring in 1999.

Coach Bob Farrell achieved his 700th career win during the 2007–08 season, the same night that then-senior Ashton Gibbs broke Keven McDonald's all-time over 30-year-old scoring record of 1,774 points. Gibbs attended the University of Pittsburgh and saw considerable playing time as a freshman, including in the Elite Eight loss to Villanova University on March 28, 2009. Farrell finished his coaching career in 2011 with 777 wins.

Seton Hall Prep alumni — including Ira Bowman, Brevin Knight, and Brandin Knight — have gone on to play in the National Basketball Association, and Spencer Weisz has gone on to play in the Israeli Basketball Premier League. Once known as a feeder school for the Seton Hall University basketball program, the school now sends players to a variety of universities. Alumni Ira Bowman (Auburn), Brandin Knight (Rutgers), and Marcus Toney-El (Fairleigh Dickinson) are all currently Division I assistant basketball coaches, and Michael Malone is the head coach of the NBA's Denver Nuggets.

==== Cross country ====
The boys' cross country team won the Non-Public Group A state championship in 1946, 1948-1950, 1960 and 1961.

==== Lacrosse ====
Seton Hall Prep captured the 1992 Prep State B lacrosse championship, led by All-State players Matthew Lewis, Brad Corbett, and Greg Tears, under the leadership of head coach Patrick Tevlin.

The lacrosse team won the Group IV state championship in 2004, defeating Christian Brothers Academy in the championship game.

In 2019, the team won its seventh consecutive Essex County Tournament title, defeating Glen Ridge High School by a score of 12–4 in the final game of the tournament. Including the win in 2019, the program has won the Essex County Tournament in 10 of the 17 years it has been played since it was established in 2004.

The team has also had many Division 1 lacrosse players come through their program, including professional Jules Heningburg.

==== Soccer ====
The boys soccer team won the Non-Public Group A state championship in 2007 (defeating Christian Brothers Academy in the tournament final), 2009 (vs. Christian Brothers) and 2019 (vs, St. Augustine Preparatory School).

The soccer team won the 2005 North A state sectional championship with a 5–0 win over Don Bosco Preparatory High School. In 2007 the team achieved a number one statewide ranking from The Star-Ledger and a number five ranking in a national coaches' poll. The 2007 team won the North A state sectional championship with consecutive 3-2 wins over No. 1 ranked Don Bosco, and then the new No. 1 team and rival Delbarton in the North Jersey Final. The team moved on to win the Non-Public A state championship with a 2–0 win over Christian Brothers Academy. They finished the season at 22–1, with several school records: 16 shutouts, 22 wins and 95 goals.

In 2009, the Seton Hall Prep soccer won another state championship; defeating Christian Brothers Academy 1–0. SHP finished the season ranked number 1 in the state and ranked 8th in the nation. In 2010, the Seton Hall Prep soccer team was ranked first in the nation but failed to secure a championship.

In 2019, Seton Hall Prep soccer won another Non-Public A state title after beating St. Augustine, by a score of 1–0 in the finals. The Pirates also won the sectional title after defeating Pingry School 5–3, and won the Essex County Tournament after besting Montclair High School by a score of 1–0. In addition to county and state championships, the boys soccer team won the Super Essex Conference by finishing first in regular season play and thus completed the triple crown. Beyond trophies, the 2019 season was highlighted by program records where the team tied the school record of 22 wins in one season and set a new record with 20 shutout games.

==== Track ====
A number of former Pirates have competed on the international level for the United States and Jamaica.

The boys indoor / winter track team won the Non-Public state championship in 1938, 1939 and 1970, in Non-Public Group III/IV in 1940 in Non-Public A in 1980 and 2023; The program's 9 state championships are tied for sixth-most in the state.

The track team won the Non-Public Group A spring / outdoor track state championship in 1950, 1959, 1960, 1970, 1984, 1986 and 2007.

The boys track team won the Non-Public indoor relay state championship in 1970 and 1971.

==== Hockey ====
For decades, the Pirates have been among the elite of New Jersey high school hockey programs, along with long-standing rivalries with Bergen Catholic and Delbarton (which had even been mentioned in an episode of HBO's The Sopranos). Their home ice is South Mountain Arena at the Richard J. Codey Ice Rink in West Orange, the former practice facility of the NHL's New Jersey Devils. The ice hockey team won the Non-Public state championship in 1997-1999 and 2004, and won the overall state championship in 1998, 1999 and 2004. The team won the Gordon Cup in 1978, 1983, 1993, 1997, 1998, 2000-2002, 2006 Former coach Peter Herms, who had coached the team for 14 years until his resignation in 2010, was inducted into the inaugural class of the New Jersey High School Ice Hockey Hall of Fame. Herms, along with co-coach John Warchol (who is also a member of the inaugural class of the Hall of Fame), led Seton Hall to six Gordon Cups, four NJSIAA Non-Public titles, and three Tournament of Champions titles, which were won in 1998, 1999 and 2004. The 1997-98 team was inducted into the New Jersey High School Ice Hockey Hall of Fame in 2012.

==== Swimming ====
Swimming is arguably the Prep's most dominant sport. In 2019, Seton Hall won its 22nd consecutive Essex County Championship. Since 1980, the swim team has won 27 out of a possible 28 county championships (there was no championship meet in 1984, and from 1987 to 1997, team scoring was not used, and thus a team champion was not named). The Pirates have won a conference title every year since 1994, with two exceptions, 1997 and 2009. On February 26, 2022, Seton Hall Prep won the first NJSIAA Non-Public A state championship in school history, defeating Christian Brothers Academy by 93-77 in the finals.

Seton Hall Prep swimmers have been the recipient of the Cullen Jones Award, given annually to the most valuable swimmer at the Essex County Championships, seven times since the award's creation in 2009, Including a student who won the honor three consecutive times from 2017 to 2019, the award's second three-time winner.

==== Wrestling ====
The wrestling team won the Non-Public Group A North state sectional championship in 1981-1983, 1987 and 1989, and won the Non-Public A state championship in 1983.

Six Seton Hall Prep wrestlers have won individual state championships.
