= Immaculate Conception High School (Montclair, New Jersey) =

Private high school in Essex County, New Jersey, US

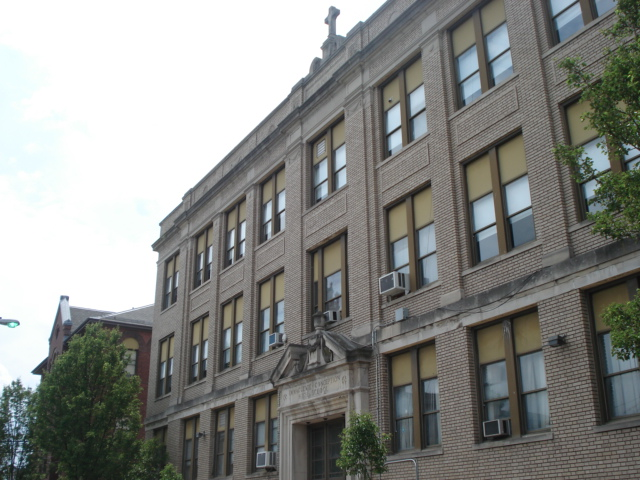
- The school building's front façade

Location
- 33 Cottage Place; Montclair, (Essex County), New Jersey 07042; United States
- 40.816295°N 74.216258°W

Information
- Other name: Immaculate Montclair
- Type: Private, Coeducational
- Religious affiliation: Roman Catholic
- Denomination: Sisters of Charity
- Patron saints: Immaculate Conception, St. Teresa of Calcutta, St. Elizabeth Ann Seton
- Established: 1925
- Founder: Rev. Fr. Edward Farrel
- Status: Closed (2025)
- School board: Board of Trustees
- School district: Archdiocese of Newark
- Category: High School
- Superintendent: Margaret Dames
- CEEB code: 310805
- NCES School ID: 00864005
- President: Mike Malkinski
- Principal: Michele Neves
- Faculty: 15 FTEs
- Grades: 9–12
- Enrollment: 164 (as of 2023–24)
- Student to teacher ratio: 10.9:1
- Colors: Navy blue White and Silver
- Athletics conference: Super Essex Conference (general); North Jersey Super Football Conference (football)
- Mascot: Lion
- Team name: Lions
- Accreditation: Middle States Association of Colleges and Schools
- Yearbook: Immaculata
- Tuition: $9,800 (2022-23)
- Alumni: Blue Lion Booster Club
- Website: www.ichspride.org

Immaculate Conception High School was a Roman Catholic co-educational college preparatory high school located in Montclair, in Essex County, in the U.S. state of New Jersey. The school operated under the supervision of the Roman Catholic Archdiocese of Newark. The school had been accredited by the Middle States Association of Colleges and Schools Commission on Elementary and Secondary Schools since 1957.

Immaculate Conception High School was established in 1925 as a parish school under the guidance of its founder, Rev. Edward M. Farrel. The Sisters of Charity of Saint Elizabeth began their connection to the school with the appointment of Mother Mary Alexandrine as the school's first principal. Facing financial challenges and a drop in enrollment, the Newark archdiocese announced that the school would close at the end of the 2024–25 school year.

As of the 2023–24 school year, the school had an enrollment of 164 students and 15.0 classroom teachers (on an FTE basis), for a student–teacher ratio of 10.9:1. The school's student body was 67.7% (111) Black, 17.1% (2) Hispanic, 11.6% (19) two or more races, 2.4% (4) White and 1.2% (2) Asian.

== History ==
By 2014, the school had debts of $900,000. That year NJ.com reported that the school was "fighting to stay open." Fundraisers that year generated about $500,000 helped to ensure the school's survival. The necessary money was generated in approximately one month.

== Athletics ==
The Immaculate Conception High School Lions compete in the Super Essex Conference, which is comprised of public and private high schools in Essex County and operates under the supervision of the New Jersey State Interscholastic Athletic Association (NJSIAA). Prior to the 2010 realignment of the NJSIAA, the school had previously participated in the Colonial Hills Conference; which included schools in Essex, Morris and Somerset counties in west Central Jersey. With 170 students in grades 10–12, the school was classified by the NJSIAA for the 2019–20 school year as Non-Public B for most athletic competition purposes, which included schools with an enrollment of 37 to 366 students in that grade range (equivalent to Group I for public schools). The football team competes in the United Blue division of the North Jersey Super Football Conference, which includes 112 schools competing in 20 divisions, making it the nation's biggest football-only high school sports league.

The boys basketball team won the Non-Public Group C state championship in 1978, defeating Sacred Heart High School by a score of 53–51 in the tournament finals.

The boys track team won the spring / outdoor track title in Non-Public B in 1980–1984, 1986–1988, 1998 and 2005. The program's 10 state titles are tied for eighth-most in the state.

The 1983 softball team finished the season with a 16–10 record after winning the Non-Public group B state championship in 1983, with a 9–6 victory against runner-up Gloucester Catholic High School in the finals.

The girls team won the NJSIAA spring / outdoor track state championship in Non-Public B in 1991.

The football team won the Non-Public B South state sectional championship in 1994 and the Non-Public Group I title in 1998. The 1994 team finished the season 11–0 after winning the Non-Public B South title against four-time defending champion St. Joseph High School by s score of 20–6 in the tournament final.

Dominique Booker won the 55 meter dash at the 2009 Meet of Champions with a time of 6.92 seconds, setting a meet record that was also the fastest time in the nation for the event that year. At the 2011 Meet of Champions, Mirabel Nkenke won a silver medal with a time of 56.21 in the 400 meter dash, setting a school record for the event.

== Notable alumni ==
- Tom Ammiano (born 1941), politician and LGBT rights activist who served as a member of the California State Assembly and on the San Francisco Board of Supervisors
- Rich Kenah (born 1970), middle-distance runner who represented the United States at the 2000 Summer Olympics in Sydney
- Jose L. Linares (born 1953), former Chief United States district judge of the United States District Court for the District of New Jersey
- Naturi Naughton (born 1984), actress and singer-songwriter who was one-third of the R&B trio 3LW
- Clifford Omoruyi (born 2001), college basketball player for the Alabama Crimson Tide
- Sophie Rain (born 2004), internet content creator
- Ron Simpson, former professional basketball player
- Ben Sirmans (born 1970), American football coach and former running back who is the running backs coach for the Green Bay Packers of the National Football League
- Dick Tarrant (born 1928, class of 1946), head men's basketball coach at the University of Richmond from 1981 to 1993
- Zakai Zeigler (born 2002), college basketball player for the Tennessee Volunteers
