= Colonial Hills Conference =

Defunct high school athletic association

The Colonial Hills Conference was a New Jersey high school sports association under the jurisdiction of the New Jersey State Interscholastic Athletic Association (NJSIAA). The conference comprised sixteen public, parochial, and private high schools covering Essex County, Morris County and Somerset County in north-central North Jersey.

Also known as the CHC, the conference disbanded after the 2008–09 school year as part of a major realignment of Northern New Jersey athletic leagues promulgated by the NJSIAA. Most member schools moved to the Northwest Jersey Athletic Conference or the Super Essex Conference.

The Conference had two divisions for most sports, the Colonial Division and the Hills Division.

== Colonial Division ==
School	Location	School District	Team Name
Arts High School	Newark	Newark Public Schools	Jaguars
Boonton High School	Boonton	Boonton Public Schools	Bombers
Kinnelon High School	Kinnelon	Kinnelon Public Schools	Colts
Mountain Lakes High School	Mountain Lakes	Mountain Lakes Schools	Lakers
Science Park High School	Newark	Newark Public Schools	Chargers
University High School	Newark	Newark Public Schools	Phoenix
Verona High School	Verona	Verona Public Schools	Hillbillies
Whippany Park High School	Hanover Township	Hanover Park Regional High School District	Wildcats

== Hills Division ==
School	Location	School District	Team Name
Cedar Grove High School	Cedar Grove	Cedar Grove Schools	Panthers
Glen Ridge High School	Glen Ridge	Glen Ridge Public Schools	Ridgers
Immaculate Conception High School	Montclair		Lions
Montclair Kimberley Academy	Montclair		Cougars
Morristown-Beard School	Morris Township		Crimson
Morris Catholic High School	Denville		Crusaders
Newark Academy	Livingston		Minutemen
Pingry School	Martinsville		Big Blue
