= Christopher Cerf =

Christopher Cerf may refer to:

- Christopher Cerf (producer) (born 1941), American writer, actor, and record and television producer
- Christopher Cerf (school administrator) (born c. 1954), American education administrator and lawyer
