= Bergen County Technical High School =

Bergen County Technical High School may refer to:

- Bergen County Technical High School, Paramus Campus
- Bergen County Technical High School, Teterboro Campus
