= Mount Saint Dominic Academy =

Catholic high school in Essex County, New Jersey, US

Location
- 3 Ryerson Avenue; Caldwell, (Essex County), New Jersey 07006; United States; 40°50′2″N 74°16′9″W

Information
- Type: Private, All-Girls
- Motto: "Empowering Young Women"
- Religious affiliations: Roman Catholic, Dominican Sisters
- Established: 1892
- NCES School ID: 00862664
- Dean: Chase Padusniak
- Head of school: Juliette M. Picciano
- Faculty: 32.5 FTEs
- Grades: 9–12
- Enrollment: 254 (as of 2023–24)
- Student to teacher ratio: 7.8:1
- Colors: Navy blue and white
- Athletics conference: Super Essex Conference
- Mascot: Leo the Lion
- Team name: Lady Lions
- Accreditation: Middle States Association of Colleges and Schools
- Publication: Golden Fleece (literary magazine)
- Newspaper: The Argosy
- Yearbook: Lumen
- School fees: $1,700
- Tuition: $22,323.60 (2025–26)
- Website: www.msdacademy.org

Mount St. Dominic Academy is a four-year Catholic college preparatory school for young women located in Caldwell, in Essex County, in the U.S. state of New Jersey, serving students in ninth through twelfth grades. The school was founded in 1892 by the Dominican Sisters of Caldwell. It is located within the Roman Catholic Archdiocese of Newark.

As of the 2023–24 school year, the school had an enrollment of 254 students and 32.5 classroom teachers (on an FTE basis), for a student–teacher ratio of 7.8:1.

== History ==
Founded in Jersey City, New Jersey in 1892, the school moved to Caldwell in 1912. A new building was completed in 1915, providing space for dormitories and other school facilities.

== Description ==
Mount St. Dominic Academy has been accredited by the Middle States Association of Colleges and Schools Commission on Elementary and Secondary Schools since 1934. MSDA is a member of the New Jersey Association of Independent Schools, the National Coalition of Girls' Schools (NCGS), and the Dominican Association of Secondary Schools. Juliette M. Picciano, is the Head of School. The school, whose motto is "empowering young women", has a graduation rate and a college acceptance rate of 100%. Students are accepted into and attend some of the most highly regarded colleges and universities nationwide.

The school shares a campus with Caldwell University and the Sisters of Saint Dominic that covers 21 acres (8.5 ha). Facilities include science labs, an athletic center and a 400+ seat performing arts center.

Study, prayer, community, and service are the basis of religious education at Mount St. Dominic Academy. The Siena Service Program is a four-year community service program that consists of a specific number of hours of approved service at in-school or outside agencies. The Mount not only focuses on college prep, but career readiness as well. The special academic programs include Senior Capstone, L.E.O. Program, Health Science & Social Justice Endorsements Program, Robotics, and optional participation with OneSchoolhouse.

Mount St. Dominic Academy provides students with a wide range of honors classes, including Mathematics, Literature, Biology, Chemistry, Physics, Anatomy, U.S. History, Modern World History, Spanish, and French. Advanced Placement AP Courses include Biology, Calculus AB, Calculus BC, Chemistry, English Literature and Composition, English Language and Composition, French Language and Culture, Physics, Psychology, Spanish, Spanish Language and Culture, Statistics, US Government and Politics, U.S. History, and World History. Graduates from the Mount's class of 2020 were accepted into over 100 schools and were awarded more than $17 million in scholarships and grants. A number of students receive commendation in the National Merit Scholarship Program and recognition in the National Hispanic Scholar Award.

== Athletics ==
The Mount St. Dominic Academy Lady Lions compete in the Super Essex Conference which is comprised of public and private high schools in Essex County and was established following a reorganization of sports leagues in Northern New Jersey by the New Jersey State Interscholastic Athletic Association (NJSIAA). Before the NJSIAA's 2010 realignment, the school had competed in the Northern Hills Conference an athletic conference which included schools located in Essex, Morris and Passaic counties. With 396 students in grades 10-12, the school was classified by the NJSIAA for the 2019–20 school year as Non-Public A for most athletic competition purposes, which included schools with an enrollment of 381-1,454 students in that grade range (equivalent to Group I for public schools). The Mount offers a variety of both Varsity and JV teams, including sports such as basketball, bowling, cross country, field hockey, golf, lacrosse, soccer, softball, swimming, tennis, track, and volleyball. Approximately one half of the students participate in athletics.

The softball team won the Non-Public B state championship in 1994 (defeating Gloucester Catholic High School in the finals) and 1995 (vs. Eustace Preparatory School), and won the Non-Public A title in 2014 (vs. Immaculata High School) and in 2025 (vs. Donovan Catholic). In 1994, the team beat Gloucester Catholic by a score of 12-2 to win the Parochial B championship game and finish the season at 24-3. The 1995 team finished the season with a record of 24-1 after defeating Bishop Eustace by a score of 7-0 in the championship game. NJ.com / The Star-Ledger ranked Mount St. Dominic as their number-one softball team in the state in 1994.

The basketball team won the Non-Public Group B state championship in 1994, defeating St. Rose High School in the tournament final. The team entered the 1994 Tournament of Champions as the third seed, and defeated number-six seed Haddonfield Memorial High School by a score of 57-32 in the quarterfinals, second seed St. John Vianney High School by 74-55 in the semis and went on to win the championship with a 52-45 win against fifth-seeded Delsea Regional High School in the finals played at the Jadwin Gymnasium.

The volleyball team won the Group I state championship in 1994, against runner-up Secaucus High School in the playoff finals.

The track team won the indoor relay state championship in Non-Public Group IV in 2011 and 2018. The 2011 indoor track team won the NJSIAA Non-Public Relays championship and the New Jersey Catholic Track Conference championship and finished second by a single point to perennial powerhouse Columbia High School at the Essex County Track Championships, where The Mount team set several records. The track team won the indoor track public state championship in Non-Public Group B in 2010-2012 and 2016.

The school's swim team won the Non-Public Group B state title in 2012, ending the season with a 13–0 record and winning conference and county titles in addition to the program's first state championship.

The spring track team was the Non-Public Group B state champion in 2012.

== Arts ==
Visual arts

Mount St. Dominic Academy offers a variety of arts courses, such as Drawing, Photography, Painting, and AP Studio Art; and extracurriculars such as Art Club, Choir, and Dance.

Performing arts

The Performing Arts Department features two annual productions: a Fall Drama and a Spring Musical.

== Notable alumnae ==
- Whitney Houston (1963–2012), singer and actress
- Donna Leon (born 1942), author of a series of crime novels set in Venice and featuring the fictional hero Commissario Guido Brunetti
- L. Grace Spencer (born 1968, class of 1986), judge of the New Jersey Superior Court who served in the New Jersey General Assembly where she represented the 29th Legislative District from 2008 to 2016
