= University High School (New Jersey) =

High school in Essex County, New Jersey, US

University High School of Humanities

Location
- 55 Clinton Place; Newark, Essex County, New Jersey 07108; United States; 40.72104°N 74.210697°W

Information
- Type: Public high school
- Established: 1977; 49 years ago
- School district: Newark Public Schools
- NCES School ID: 341134002202
- Principal: Genique Flournoy-Hamilton
- Faculty: 40.0 FTEs
- Grades: 7 - 12
- Enrollment: 447 (as of 2023–24)
- Student to teacher ratio: 11.2:1
- Colors: Burgundy and Silver
- Athletics conference: Super Essex Conference
- Team name: Phoenix
- Newspaper: Phoenix Flame
- Website: www.nps.k12.nj.us/UNI

University High School of Humanities (usually University High School) is a six-year public high school serving students in seventh through twelfth grades in Newark, in Essex County, in the U.S. state of New Jersey, as part of the Newark Public Schools.

Originally created as a program called "School Within a School" at Malcolm X Shabazz High School, University High School became a standalone school in 1977. It moved into the old Clinton Place Junior High building in 1982.

As of the 2023–24 school year, the school had an enrollment of 447 students and 40.0 classroom teachers (on an FTE basis), for a student–teacher ratio of 11.2:1. There were 334 students (74.7% of enrollment) eligible for free lunch and 39 (8.7% of students) eligible for reduced-cost lunch.

== Awards, recognition and rankings ==
The school was the 237th-ranked public high school in New Jersey out of 339 schools statewide in New Jersey Monthly magazine's September 2014 cover story on the state's "Top Public High Schools", using a new ranking methodology. The school had been ranked 171st in the state of 328 schools in 2012, after being ranked 131st in 2010 out of 322 schools listed. The magazine ranked the school 66th in 2008 out of 316 schools. The school was ranked 146th in the magazine's September 2006 issue, which included 316 schools across the state. Schooldigger.com ranked the school tied for 55th out of 381 public high schools statewide in its 2011 rankings (an increase of 27 positions from the 2010 ranking) which were based on the combined percentage of students classified as proficient or above proficient on the mathematics (91.6%) and language arts literacy (97.2%) components of the High School Proficiency Assessment (HSPA).

In 2011, University High School seniors won the National Urban Debate Championship, a three-day tournament with over 7,000 students from 38 schools in 19 cities participating.

== Athletics ==
The University High School Phoenix compete in the Super Essex Conference, which is comprised of public and private high schools in Essex County and was established following a reorganization of sports leagues in Northern New Jersey by the New Jersey State Interscholastic Athletic Association (NJSIAA). Prior to the NJSIAA's realignment in 2010, the school had competed in the Colonial Division of the Colonial Hills Conference, which included public and private high schools in Essex, Morris and Somerset counties. With 381 students in grades 10-12, the school was classified by the NJSIAA for the 2019–20 school year as Group I for most athletic competition purposes, which included schools with an enrollment of 75 to 476 students in that grade range.

In 1989, the boys' track team, led by senior Darrell Davis, won the North II, Group I state sectional championships. Davis was the 1988 and 1989 Group I sectional winner in the 100 m and 200 m races as well as the All Group I 100 m champion.

The girls' basketball team won the Group I state championship in 2007 (vs. Palmyra High School), 2008 (vs. Wildwood High School), 2016 (vs. Bound Brook High School), 2018 (vs. Bound Brook), 2019 (vs. Bound Brook), 2022 (vs. Shore Regional High School), 2023 (vs. Shore Regional) and 2024 (vs. Shore Regional). The program's eight state titles are tied for sixth-most in the state. The team won the North II, Group I state sectional championship in 2007 with a 66–50 win over Bloomfield Tech High School and moved on to win the Group I state championship, defeating Palmyra High School by a score of 80–55 for the title. The team made it to the 2007 Tournament of Champions, defeating Willingboro High School, 71–58, in the first round, Trenton Catholic Academy, 61–51, in the semis and Trenton Central High School, 68–62, in the finals to win the tournament. The 2016 beat Bound Brook by a score of 81-55 in the Group I playoff finals at the Pine Belt Arena and as the sixth seed in the Tournament of Champions lost in the quarterfinals round to third-seeded Manasquan High School by 57-49, despite leading by seven points in the last five minutes of the game. In 2019, the team faced Bound Brook in the Group I state championship game for the fourth consecutive year and won the title with a 41–20 win, their third championship in the four match-ups between the two teams, and entered the Tournament of Champions seeded fifth before losing in the first round to by a score of 61-45 to a St. Rose High School team that was ranked fourth.

The boys' basketball team won the Group I state championship in 2009 (defeating Asbury Park High School in the playoff finals) and 2010 (vs. Woodbury Junior-Senior High School) and 2016(vs. Paulsboro High School). The team won the Group I title in 2016 with a 63–45 win against Paulsboro.

== Academics ==
University High School is a college preparatory institution, where students can pick from three academies; Law, Teaching, or Fields of Humanities to specialize in and complete courses based on their choices, though students are free to specialize in the major of their choice.

== Administration ==
The school's principal is Genique Flournoy-Hamilton. Her core administration team includes two vice principals.

== Notable alumni ==
- Ras Baraka (born 1970), Mayor of Newark
- Niobia Bryant (born 1972), author, also writes urban fiction as Meesha Mink
- Faith Evans (born 1973), R&B singer
- Nadirah McKenith (born 1991), professional basketball player who has played in WNBA for the Washington Mystics and Minnesota Lynx
- Laurin Mincy (born 1992), professional basketball player
- Brittney Sykes (born 1994, class of 2012), basketball guard with the Atlanta Dream of the Women's National Basketball Association
- The Three Doctors, a group of African-American motivational speakers, authors, and doctors that includes Dr. Rameck Hunt, Dr. Sampson Davis and Dr. George Jenkins
