= Bard High School Early College Newark =

High school in New Jersey, United States

Location
- 321 Bergen Street; Newark, Essex County, New Jersey 07103; United States
- 40.734101°N 74.195289°W

Information
- Type: Magnet public high school
- Established: 2011
- School district: Newark Public Schools
- NCES School ID: 341134003158
- Principal: Rafael Inoa
- Faculty: 31.5 FTEs
- Grades: 9th-12th
- Enrollment: 395 (as of 2024–25)
- Student to teacher ratio: 12.5:1
- Campus: Urban
- Website: www.nps.k12.nj.us/BEH

Bard High School Early College Newark is a magnet public high school in Newark, in Essex County, in the U.S. state of New Jersey. Established in 2011, it is part of Newark Public Schools.

As of the 2024–25 school year, the school had an enrollment of 395 students and 31.5 classroom teachers (on an FTE basis), for a student–teacher ratio of 12.5:1. There were 208 students (52.7% of enrollment) eligible for free lunch and 39 (9.9% of students) eligible for reduced-cost lunch.

Working with Bard College, students earn 60 college credits as part of a liberal arts and sciences curriculum toward an associate degree in addition to a high school diploma. The college program is operated as a branch of Bard College at Simon's Rock and is accredited by the New England Association of Schools and Colleges.
