= Iron Hills Conference =

American scholastic athletic league

The Iron Hills Conference was an athletic conference of twenty high schools located in Essex County, Morris County, and Union County in New Jersey, United States. The Iron division was often regarded as one of the most competitive in the state.

The conference was split up at the end of the 2008–2009 sports season due to conference realignment changes made by the NJSIAA. The Essex County schools joined the Super Essex Conference, the Morris County schools joined the Northwest Jersey Athletic Conference, and the Union County schools joined the Union County Interscholastic Athletic Conference.

== Member schools ==
School	Location	School district	Mascot	Division	Colors
Chatham High School	Chatham	School District of the Chathams	Cougars	Hills	Navy and White
Columbia High School	Maplewood	South Orange-Maplewood School District	Cougars	Iron	Red and Black
Dover High School	Dover	Dover School District	Tigers	Hills	Maroon and Gold
East Orange Campus High School	East Orange	East Orange School District	Jaguars	Iron	Blue and Orange
Hanover Park High School	East Hanover	Hanover Park Regional High School District	Hornets	Hills	Black and Gold
Livingston High School	Livingston	Livingston Public Schools	Lancers	Iron	Green and White
Morris Hills High School	Rockaway	Morris Hills Regional High School District	Scarlet Knights	Hills	Scarlet and White
Morris Knolls High School	Denville	Morris Hills Regional High School District	Golden Eagles	Iron	Green and Gold
Morristown High School	Morristown	Morris School District	Colonials	Iron	Maroon and White
Mount Olive High School	Mount Olive	Mount Olive Township School District	Marauders	Iron	Maroon and Black
Parsippany High School	Parsippany	Parsippany-Troy Hills School District	Red Hawks	Hills	Red and White
Parsippany Hills High School	Parsippany	Parsippany-Troy Hills School District	Vikings	Hills	Navy and Silver
Randolph High School	Randolph	Randolph Township Schools	Rams	Iron	Maroon and White
Roxbury High School	Succasunna	Roxbury School District	Gaels	Iron	Navy and Gold
Seton Hall Preparatory School	West Orange	Private/Parochial	Pirates	Iron	Blue and White
Summit High School	Summit	Summit Public Schools	Hilltoppers	Hills	Maroon and Gold
Weequahic High School	Newark	Newark Public Schools	Indians	Hills	Orange and Brown
West Essex High School	North Caldwell	West Essex Regional School District	Knights	Hills	Red and Black
West Morris Central High School	Washington Township	West Morris Regional High School District	Highlanders/Wolfpack	Iron	Blue and Gray
West Morris Mendham High School	Mendham	West Morris Regional High School District	Minutemen	Hills	Red, White, and Blue

== Notes ==
- East Orange Campus High School houses the upperclassmen; freshmen are housed at East Orange Campus 9 High School.
- Some of West Morris Central's teams go by "Wolfpack." However, the "Highlanders" nickname is retained out of respect for the school's alumni.
