= American History High School =

Magnet high school in Newark, New Jersey, United States

Location
- 74 Montgomery Street; Newark, Essex County, New Jersey 07103; United States
- 40.730201°N 74.186889°W

Information
- Type: Magnet Public high school
- Established: 2006
- School district: Newark Public Schools
- NCES School ID: 341134000791
- Principal: Margaret Murray
- Faculty: 35.0 FTEs
- Grades: 9th-12th
- Enrollment: 386 (as of 2024–25)
- Student to teacher ratio: 11.0:1
- Campus: Urban
- Team name: Bald Eagles
- Website: www.nps.k12.nj.us/HIS/

American History High School is a magnet public high school in the University Heights neighborhood of Newark, in Essex County, in the U.S. state of New Jersey, operating since its establishment in 2006 as part of the Newark Public Schools. Operating together with the Gilder Lehrman Institute of American History, the New Jersey Historical Society and Rutgers–Newark, American History High School's magnet program is designed to take advantage of the city's place in American history and its access to academic, cultural and civic resources as part of a college preparatory curriculum designed to assist students in understanding local, state and national history and preparing each student to attend college.

As of the 2024–25 school year, the school had an enrollment of 386 students and 35.0 classroom teachers (on an FTE basis), for a student–teacher ratio of 11.0:1. There were 281 students (72.8% of enrollment) eligible for free lunch and 22 (5.7% of students) eligible for reduced-cost lunch.

== Awards, recognition and rankings ==
The school was the 251st-ranked public high school in New Jersey out of 339 schools statewide in New Jersey Monthly magazine's September 2014 cover story on the state's "Top Public High Schools", using a new ranking methodology. The school had been ranked 198th in the state of 328 schools in 2012, the first time that the school was ranked by the magazine.

Schooldigger.com ranked the school 136th out of 381 public high schools statewide in its 2011 rankings (an increase of 113 positions from the 2010 ranking) which were based on the combined percentage of students classified as proficient or above proficient on the mathematics (82.4%) and language arts literacy (96.5%) components of the High School Proficiency Assessment (HSPA).

== Athletics ==
The American History High School Bald Eagles participate in men's bowling, men's basketball, men's soccer, women's softball and men's / women's volleyball, competing independently under the auspices of the New Jersey State Interscholastic Athletic Association (NJSIAA). With 215 students in grades 10-12, the school is classified by the NJSIAA in North II, Group I, which includes schools with enrollment in that grade range from 73 to 487.
