= Newark Arts High School =

High school in Essex County, New Jersey, US

Location
- 550 Dr. Martin Luther King Jr. Boulevard; Newark, Essex County, New Jersey 07102; United States; 40.734163°N 74.180387°W

Information
- Type: Magnet Public high school
- Established: 1931
- School district: Newark Public Schools
- NCES School ID: 341134002188
- Principal: Regina Sharpe
- Faculty: 51.5 FTEs
- Grades: 9 – 12
- Enrollment: 611 (as of 2024–25)
- Student to teacher ratio: 11.9:1
- Colors: Forest Green; Gray and white
- Athletics conference: Super Essex Conference
- Team name: Jaguars
- Website: www.nps.k12.nj.us/ART/

Newark Arts High School is a four-year magnet public high school, serving students in Ninth through twelfth grades in Newark, in Essex County, in the U.S. state of New Jersey, operating as part of the Newark Public Schools. The school is located in the University Heights section of Newark. Starting in 2011–12, the seventh graders of William Brown Academy were housed there as that school's facility was being constructed.

As of the 2024–25 school year, the school had an enrollment of 611 students and 51.5 classroom teachers (on an FTE basis), for a student–teacher ratio of 11.9:1. There were 380 students (62.2% of enrollment) eligible for free lunch and 37 (6.1% of students) eligible for reduced-cost lunch.

== Awards, recognition and rankings ==
The school was the 248th-ranked public high school in New Jersey out of 339 schools statewide in New Jersey Monthly magazine's September 2014 cover story on the state's "Top Public High Schools", using a new ranking methodology. The school had been ranked 240th in the state of 328 schools in 2012, after being ranked 205th in 2010 out of 322 schools listed. The magazine ranked the school 154th in 2008 out of 316 schools. The school was ranked 186th in the magazine's September 2006 issue, which surveyed 316 schools across the state.

== History ==
Arts High School opened its doors to students in September 1931 as the first public high school in the United States specializing in the visual and performing arts.

By the mid-1970s, Arts High School faced challenges from budget cuts affecting public schools in general, and those of the older cities in particular. The school also faced competition from other districts, such as the Montclair Public Schools in the suburban portion of Essex County, that was starting a high school magnet arts program of its own.

In 1983, Newark voters approved by referendum a $62.6 million bond package, which included $8 million to be used for a renovation and expansion project at Arts High School. After an 18-month-long renovation project, the school reopened in January 1996, with the addition of drama and science laboratories, and a preserved Art Deco-style auditorium.

During 2006-07, Arts High School celebrated its 75th anniversary in year-long events. The celebrations began in October 2006 with a 75th Anniversary Gala and Alumni Day. In December, 2006, sponsored by the Arts High Consortium at the Newark Museum, the first Arts High Hall of Fame was established by President of Arts High Consortium Volora Howell and Willie Cole; notable inductees include Fashion Designer, Steven Burrows; Dancer/Choreographer, Savion Glover; and Singer/Actress Melba Moore. The finale, featuring "Savion Glover and Friends" celebrating National Tap Dance Day was held on Friday, May 25, 2007 in the school's auditorium. Mr. Glover, the choreographer for "Happy Feet", as a special treat, performed with some of Arts' students as they accompanied him on drums. Other activities included an art exhibit, fashion show, and student essay contest-"Arts High School is 75 years old! How have your experiences at Arts High School enriched your life both personally and socially?"

Until 1997, the Arts High School also housed the Newark School of Fine and Industrial Arts, a post-secondary vocational school that focused on arts education.

== Athletics ==
The Arts High School Jaguars compete in the Super Essex Conference, which includes public and private high schools in Essex County, following a reorganization of sports leagues in Northern New Jersey by the New Jersey State Interscholastic Athletic Association (NJSIAA). Prior to the NJSIAA's 2010 realignment, the school had competed as part of the Colonial Hills Conference. With 476 students in grades 10-12, the school was classified by the NJSIAA for the 2019–20 school year as Group I for most athletic competition purposes, which included schools with an enrollment of 75 to 476 students in that grade range.

Sports offered include volleyball, basketball, softball and baseball.

The girls indoor relay team won the Group I state championship in 1989-1991. The boys team won the Group I title in 1990 and 1993.

== Administration ==
The principal is Regina Sharpe. Her core administration team includes the vice principal.

== Notable alumni ==
- Tawatha Agee (born 1954), background singer and songwriter, who was the lead singer of the soul/R&B band Mtume
- Paul Bacon (1923–2015), graphic designer best known for his work on book jackets and album covers
- Amina Baraka (born 1942 as Sylvia Robinson), poet, actress, author, community organizer, singer, dancer and activist
- Andy Bey (born 1939), jazz singer and pianist
- Charles Calello (born 1938), musical director
- Tisha Campbell-Martin (born 1968), actress
- John-Michael Caprio (1947–1997), conductor
- Crystal Clarke (born 1993 or 1994, class of 2011), actress best known for her roles in the BBC / Amazon Prime miniseries Ordeal by Innocence and in the ITV / PBS adaptation of Jane Austen's Sanditon
- Willie Cole (born 1955), contemporary sculptor, printer, and conceptual and visual artist
- Marion Crecco (1930–2015), politician who served in the New Jersey General Assembly from 1986 to 2002
- Leo Dee (1931–2004), photographer / painter
- Kat DeLuna (born 1987), singer and dancer
- Connie Francis (1937-2025), singer
- Charles Gaines (born 1944), conceptual artist and educator at California Institute of the Arts
- Savion Glover (born 1973, class of 1991), actor, tap dancer and choreographer
- Lorraine Gordon (1922–2018), jazz music advocate who was best known as the owner of the Village Vanguard jazz club in Greenwich Village
- Lawrence Hamm (born 1954), civil rights activist and founder of the People's Organization for Progress
- Michael B. Jordan (born 1987), actor who has appeared in All My Children, The Wire, Friday Night Lights, and Black Panther
- Mort Lindsey (1923–2012), musical director
- Melba Moore (born 1945), R&B singer
- Frankie Negrón (born 1977), salsa singer
- Nicholas H. Politan (1935–2012), attorney who served as a United States district judge of the United States District Court for the District of New Jersey
- Nicholas Reale (1922–1984), watercolorist with a lengthy career in art and teaching
- Michaela Jaé Rodriguez (born 1991), actress and singer, best known for her role as Blanca Rodriguez-Evangelista in the television drama Pose
- Woody Shaw (1944–1989), jazz trumpeter and composer
- Wayne Shorter (1933–2023, class of 1952), jazz composer and saxophonist
- Tyshawn Sorey (born 1980), drummer and composer
- Craig A. Stanley (born 1955), politician who served in the New Jersey General Assembly from 1996 to 2008, where represented the 28th Legislative District
- Don Trousdell (1937–2017), graphic designer and artist, who entered the profession during the "Golden Age" of advertising
- Sarah Vaughan (1924–1990), singer
- J. D. Williams (born 1978), actor
- Charles D. Wrege (1924–2014), management historian and professor at Rutgers University
- Larry Young (1940–1978), jazz organist
