= Science Park High School (New Jersey) =

Magnet high school in Newark, New Jersey, United States

Location
- 262 Norfolk Street; Newark, Essex County, New Jersey 07102; United States; 40.739898°N 74.185874°W

Information
- Type: Magnet Public high school/junior high
- Established: 1974 (Science High) 2006 (Science Park High)
- School district: Newark Public Schools
- NCES School ID: 341134002200
- Principal: Darleen Gearhart
- Faculty: 69.5 FTEs
- Grades: 7-12
- Enrollment: 970 (as of 2023–24)
- Student to teacher ratio: 14.0:1
- Campus: Urban
- Colors: Royal blue and gold
- Athletics conference: Super Essex Conference
- Team name: Chargers
- Newspaper: Voltage
- Website: www.nps.k12.nj.us/sci/

Science Park High School, formerly known as Science High School, is a magnet public high school located in the University Heights section of Newark in Essex County, in the U.S. state of New Jersey. The school opened in 1974 and serves students in seventh through twelfth grades as part of the Newark Public Schools. The school is for college-bound students, offering many Advanced Placement equally rigorous honors courses and as of the 2013–14 school year, IB classes to those who choose to apply.

As of the 2023–24 school year, the school had an enrollment of 970 students and 69.5 classroom teachers (on an FTE basis), for a student–teacher ratio of 14.0:1. There were 516 students (53.2% of enrollment) eligible for free lunch and 108 (11.1% of students) eligible for reduced-cost lunch.

== Academics ==
Science Park High School’s stated mission emphasizes mathematics and science education, ethical leadership, and connections among the sciences, humanities, and arts. It seeks to support these goals through research, innovative teaching, and service in laboratory learning environments.

SPHS operates on nine 42-minute period schedule, similar to Technology High School, as opposed to "block" scheduling that is utilized in other schools in the Newark Public Schools district, where students take their classes in four longer "blocks." Unlike other high schools in the city, SPHS students take two science courses specific to their academic year. SPHS students are generally expected to take Advanced Placement courses in the latter half of their four years at the school, with many students taking Advanced Placement American Literature their Senior year while many Juniors enroll in an Advanced Placement English III course.

SPHS offers math courses ranging from Geometry (offered to qualified in-coming Freshmen) to AP Calculus, Science courses are offered ranging from a Freshman year Earth, Space, and Life Sciences course to a Sophomore year Physics course to AP Biology and AP Physics.

== History ==
For 32 years, Science High School was at 40 Rector Street, in a building that was originally the Ballantine Brewery. After the brewery closed, it was acquired by Rutgers–Newark and was converted into a facility for chemistry research and training. In the 1970s, the Newark Public Schools leased the structure and converted it for use as a high school until 2006. The building was subsequently demolished in 2016 and the property is now 50 Rector Park, a 22-story luxury residential apartment building developed by Boraie Development. The class of 2006 was the first class to graduate from the new building after procuring an occupancy permit while construction was ongoing. The class of 2006 was the last graduating class of Science High School.

Science Park Logo

=== New location ===
The new building has a capacity of 926 students and is located on a 6-acre (24,000 m^{2}) campus. The school was renamed Science Park High School because of its location near and connections with the University Heights Science Park. It is a collaborative venture between Newark's higher education institutions, the City of Newark, and private industry.

The building includes a state of the art solar and geothermal energy system and highly efficient heating and cooling. The new facility includes grades 7–12. At the completion of grade 8, students may apply for entrance into the high school in the same manner as other students from Newark elementary schools, at a much higher rate of acceptance.

== Awards, recognition and rankings ==
The school was the 72nd-ranked public high school in New Jersey out of 339 schools statewide in New Jersey Monthly magazine's September 2014 cover story on the state's "Top Public High Schools", using a new ranking methodology. The school had been ranked 116th in the state of 328 schools in 2012, after being ranked 69th in 2010 out of 322 schools listed. The magazine ranked the school 50th in 2008 out of 316 schools. The school was ranked 53rd in the magazine's September 2006 issue, which included 316 schools across the state.

During the 2009–10 school year, Science Park High School was awarded the Blue Ribbon School Award of Excellence by the United States Department of Education, the highest award an American school can receive.

Schooldigger.com ranked the school 17th out of 381 public high schools statewide in its 2011 rankings (an increase of 5 positions from the 2010 ranking) which were based on the combined percentage of students classified as proficient or above proficient on the mathematics (98.8%) and language arts literacy (100.0%) components of the High School Proficiency Assessment (HSPA).

In its 2013 report on "America's Best High Schools", The Daily Beast ranked the school 687th in the nation among participating public high schools and 53rd among schools in New Jersey.

In the 2016 report on "Best High Schools National Rankings", U.S. News & World Report ranked the school 20th statewide from 422 schools and 375th from the top 6,517 public high schools nationwide and earning the Gold Medal in college readiness.

== Athletics ==
Science Park Atrium

Science Park High School Chargers compete in the Super Essex Conference, which is comprised of public and private high schools in Essex County and was established following a reorganization of sports leagues in Northern New Jersey by the New Jersey State Interscholastic Athletic Association (NJSIAA). The school competed in the Colonial Hills Conference prior to the NJSIAA's reorganization. With 556 students in grades 10–12, the school was classified by the NJSIAA for the 2019–20 school year as Group II for most athletic competition purposes, which included schools with an enrollment of 486 to 758 students in that grade range.

Sports:

- Track & Field (Coed)
- Cross Country (Coed)
- Basketball (Boys)
- Basketball (Girls)
- Golf (Coed)
- Boys Baseball
- Girls Softball
- Cheerleading
- Girls Tennis
- Soccer (Boys)
- Soccer (Girls)
- Swimming (Coed)
- Volleyball (Boys)
- Volleyball (Girls)
- Marching Band
- Step Team

The girls track team won the Group I indoor relay state championship in 1988 and 1997; the boys team won the Group I state title in 1994.

The girls' outdoor track and field team won the Group I state championship in 1988-1990 and 1992.

The girls track team won the indoor track Group I state championship in 1989–1993; the program's five state group titles are tied for seventh-most in the state. The boys team won the Group I title in 1994 and 1995 (as co-champion).

The boys track team won the Group I spring / outdoor track state championship in 1993.

The boys' basketball team won the Group I state title in 1995 vs Burlington City High School, in 2005 vs. Arthur P. Schalick High School and in 2008 vs. Salem High School, and won the Group II state championship in 2009 vs. Camden High School. Trailing by as many as 20 points, the 1995 team won the Group I state title after defeating Burlington City by a score of 68–61 in the playoff finals. The boys' basketball team won the 2008 North II, Group I state sectional title with a 51–40 win over Bloomfield Tech High School in the tournament final.

== Debate ==
The Science High School Debate Teams was established in 1979 by Brent Farrand and quickly became the model for urban debate programs nationally. By the early eighties, the Science HS Debate programs had nationally competitive teams. By the mid-eighties, the Science HS program boasted nationally ranked teams. The main difference between the Newark Science HS debate program and other nationally competitive programs was the make-up of the debate team. This was a team of students from all walks of life, economic backgrounds and ethnicity. The Newark Science HS Debate program seeded the idea that debate teams from the inner city could not only participate in debate, but they could succeed. Science High School debaters have been nationally ranked and routinely compete at the highest levels of high school debate.

== Administration ==
The school's principal is Darleen Gearhart. Her administration team includes three vice principals.

== Notable alumni ==
- Ezinne Kalu (class of 2010), professional basketball player
