= Don Trousdell =

American graphic designer and artist

Don Trousdell (1937 – February 3, 2017), was a graphic designer and artist, who entered the profession during the "Golden Age" of advertising. During his 40-year career, Trousdell won more than 500 national and international awards for his work, including four New York Art Director gold medals. Through the years Don worked with clients like U.S. Army, Metro-Goldwyn-Mayer (MGM), TBS, CNN, Headline News, Universal Studios, Busch Gardens, Coca-Cola brands, Kimberly-Clark special papers, Customweave Carpets, and The Atlanta Zoo just name a few. Trousdell also taught concept and design taught at both Syracuse and Kansas Universities.

Trousdell grew up in Newark, New Jersey. He attended Newark Arts High School and Pratt Institute, where he learned advertising design. He began his professional career as a graphic designer in Cleveland, Ohio, as creative director for a design group called, The Pitt Group”. After being asked to judge a design show in Atlanta, Georgia, he decided to move to Atlanta where he and fellow designer Ron Maybe started a studio with illustrators called, Maybe-Trousdell”. In 1975 Don ended Maybe-Trousdell to teach at Syracuse where he also started a small, but equally successful group with students called, Shoe String Studio”. Later Don would establish another design group known as, “One-up Studio” back in Atlanta. His final design group was simply known as, “Trousdell Design”.

As an artist and known for themed educational art collections, Trousdell viewed himself as a “storyteller.” He spent hours extensively researching for each series of painting. He had over 38 one-man shows, 36 of which were themed shows. One of his last exhibits, “Ordinary People,” an exhibit for St Augustine’s 450 Commemoration, tells the stories of the every day settler from Spain and his particular contribution to establish America's oldest city, St. Augustine. He also created an exhibit of paintings commemorating 9/11 titled, ”Walk in Peace” which artistically shows and explains peace symbols from all cultures throughout all time. Another exhibit, “Children of the Universe” which showed at MOSH, the museum of science and history in Jacksonville Florida is also an educational show about our solar system’s planets from a child’s perspective. Don created two other exhibits, “A Sailor”s Life” and “Inspirations”.

Trousdell is the author and illustrator of two books Dockyard Cats and The Cheating Game. The former takes an illustrated trip to the Bermuda Dockyard to discover its history and search for cats and was created to benefit Bermuda SPCA. The latter is an illustrated history (with baseball jargon) about the history of cheating in baseball. Trousdell published The Cheating Game, a book about all the ways baseball players cheated in order to get ahead, or win a game. Don saw the irony of this when Major League Baseball stopped a season of games because of “cheating”.

Through the years Don Trousdell has been mentioned or written about in numerous newspapers, magazines, and books including design annuals. However, notoriety was not his focus. He was concerned only with creative concepts and doing the work. In his words, he said about his design career, “I was lucky to begin my career in the ‘Golden Age’ of design and fortunate to have worked with many creative people.” About his latter art career he said, “I strive to create art that is current with this century - building on what we have learned from the great artists of the past. I want to make viewers see the world differently.”

Trousdell died February 3, 2017.
