= Mountain Valley Conference (New Jersey) =

The Mountain Valley Conference was a New Jersey high school sports association under the jurisdiction of the New Jersey State Interscholastic Athletic Association (NJSIAA). The conference consisted of sixteen public and parochial high schools covering Union County and Essex County in northern New Jersey. In 2009, the league was disbanded, with the Essex County schools joining the Super Essex Conference, and the Union County schools joining the Union County Interscholastic Athletic Association.

== Schools ==
In 2005, both North Plainfield High School and Ridge High School left the Mountain Valley Conference to join the Skyland Conference. In 2006, both Bound Brook High School and Manville High School also left the Mountain Valley Conference to join the Skyland. In 2006 Cranford High School joined the conference in most, but not all of its sports. Kent Place School in Summit also recently joined. At the end of the 2008-2009 this conference will be disbanded in accordance with the NJSIAA's conference realignment plan. The schools in Newark will join the Super Essex Conference (SEC) and the Union County schools will form their own conference for all sports except football. The football schools (* denotes a football school in Union County) will join schools from the former Skyland Conference to form the Mid-State 40.

- David Brearley High School *
- Central High School
- Abraham Clark High School *
- Cranford High School *
- Jonathan Dayton High School *
- Governor Livingston High School *
- Hillside High School *
- Arthur L. Johnson High School *
- Kent Place School
- Mount St. Mary Academy
- New Providence High School *
- Newark Tech High School
- Oak Knoll School of the Holy Child
- Oratory Preparatory School
- Rahway High School *
- Roselle Catholic High School
- Roselle Park High School *
- St. Mary of the Assumption High School
- Union Catholic Regional High School
