= Christopher Cerf (school administrator) =

American school administrator (born 1954)

Chris Cerf

Personal details
- Born: c. 1954 (age 71–72) Illinois, U.S.
- Education: Amherst College (BA); Columbia University (JD)

Christopher D. Cerf (born c. 1954) is an American education administrator and attorney who previously served as the state-appointed Superintendent of the Newark Public Schools in New Jersey.

== Early life ==
Cerf was born in Illinois but grew up in Washington, D.C. Around 1970, he and his family moved to Cambridge, Massachusetts, a suburb of Boston, where he attended Commonwealth School. He earned his undergraduate degree in history from Amherst College in 1977. He later graduated from Columbia Law School where in his final year he served as Editor-in-Chief of the Columbia Law Review. While at Columbia, Cerf had also spent his first summer working at the NAACP Legal Defense Fund and his second summer at a Wall Street law firm.

== Career ==
For four years before law school, Cerf taught history at Cincinnati Country Day School, a private high school in Cincinnati, Ohio. After graduating from Columbia Law School, Cerf served as a clerk to J. Skelly Wright, a judge in Court of Appeals for the District of Columbia Circuit. In 1985, Cerf became a clerk for U.S. Supreme Court Justice Sandra Day O'Connor. As a clerk, former Justice O'Connor later described Cerf as "a hard worker, a sensible worker, and he was just excellent. You can't find any fault with him." He later served on the advisory board of iCivics, an education non-profit founded by O'Connor.

After his clerkships, Cerf worked as a lawyer in two law firms in Washington, D.C., a period in which he returned to the Supreme Court to argue two cases, one of which he won. One of two Washington firms Cerf worked for was Onek, Klein & Farr. Many years later, Joel Klein, a partner at the firm, would appoint Cerf as his deputy in the New York City Department of Education. Cerf later joined Bill Clinton's first campaign for President of the United States. And after the campaign, from 1993 to 1996, Cerf was associate counsel to President Clinton. In that capacity, he worked on tobacco regulation and efforts to protect prisoner's rights to petition for habeas corpus.

After working at another Washington firm, Wiley Rein and Fielding, in 1997, he was hired as general counsel to Edison Schools Inc. (now known as EdisonLearning). In 2001, Cerf was appointed the president and chief operating officer of the company. As of at least 2006, during Cerf's tenure as president, Edison Schools was the largest for-profit contractor for public school administration in the world. While at Edison Schools, he was responsible for the handling of the backlash stemming from company's administration of public schools in Philadelphia and he also attended the Broad Superintendent Academy founded by Eli Broad. After leaving the company in 2005, Cerf joined the consulting firm Public–Private Strategy Group.

=== New York City schools ===
In early 2006, Cerf began working as a consultant to the New York City Department of Education with a salary funded by private donations. On December 21, 2006, New York City Schools Chancellor Joel Klein announced that he was appointing Cerf, who had assumed the role of Chief Transformation Officer, as deputy chancellor. Cerf is a longtime friend of the chancellor as they both worked together at the White House and Klein's law firm Onek, Klein & Farr in Washington. According to The New York Times, the appointment was part of Mayor Michael Bloomberg's initiative to increase private-sector participation in New York City schools.

When appointed deputy chancellor, Cerf had disclosed to city officials that he had retained stock options from his time at Edison Schools and therefore would recuse himself from any decisions involving the company. He later relinquished "all equity interest" but was questioned by the city's Conflicts of Interest Board for soliciting a charitable contribution from executives at Edison in an email at the same time he relinquished his financial interests in the company. After being questioned by the ethics board, Cerf rescinded his request. Edison Schools had planned to make a $60,000 donation to Darrow Foundation, a non-profit wilderness and canoeing youth program in Maine. The Conflicts of Interest Board took no disciplinary action.

In September 2009, Cerf left his post as deputy chancellor to join Mayor Bloomberg's re-election campaign as an education policy adviser. Cerf has held high positions in government and has worked for several for-profit educational corporations Global Education Advisers, and Sangari Global.

=== New Jersey schools ===
He was appointed New Jersey State Commissioner of Education by Chris Christie in 2010. In February 2014, Cerf announced that he would be leaving his post as Commissioner of Education at the end of the month to become chief executive of Amplify Insight, a division of Amplify.

In June 2015, Cerf stepped down from his executive post at Amplify in anticipation of his appointment to head the Newark City School District. The same month, he also resigned from his membership to the board of directors of the National Alliance for Public Charter Schools, a lobbying group supporting charter schools, which he had just joined in April 2015. On July 8, 2015, the New Jersey Board of Education, which at the time had direct control over the Newark schools, voted 6 to 4 to appoint Cerf as superintendent of the district school system, replacing Cami Anderson.

According to a February 2018 editorial in The Star-Ledger, Cerf closed the worst schools, fired the worst principals, and used a new contract to pay the best teachers more. By the end of his tenure as superintendent, the graduation rate had risen to 77 percent, a 20 percent increase. He was able to improve students' results in state standardized tests and increase the graduation rate while maintaining a balanced budget. Newark Mayor Ras Baraka and Cerf were able to end the pugnacious relationship between the city's leaders and state's Department of Education.

In December 2017, Cerf announced his resignation as superintendent effective on February 1, 2018, a few months ahead of the end of his contract and the same day as the state returned control of the city school district to local control. According to The New York Times, the move was intended to ease the transition to local control. Cerf was replaced by his deputy, Robert Gregory, who took over as interim superintendent while the now independent school district searched for a permanent replacement.

== Personal life ==
Cerf resides in Montclair, New Jersey. From a young age, he has enjoyed wilderness canoeing, and has led multiple expeditions near Hudson Bay. He has three children.

== See also ==
- List of law clerks for the eighth seat of the Supreme Court of the United States
