= Northern New Jersey Interscholastic League =

The Northern New Jersey Interscholastic League, abbreviated NNJIL, was a former athletic conference located in Bergen County, Passaic County and Essex County, New Jersey. The NNJIL was separated into three divisions, according to the classification they were given from the New Jersey State Interscholastic Athletic Association.

== Former Membership ==
=== Division A ===
School	Location	School District	Team Name	Classification
Belleville High School	Belleville	Belleville School District	Buccaneers	North II, Group III
Bloomfield High School	Bloomfield	Bloomfield Public Schools	Bengals	North I, Group IV
Hackensack High School	Hackensack	Hackensack Public Schools	Comets	North I, Group IV
Bergen County Technical Schools	Hackensack	Bergen County Technical Schools	Knights	North I, Group IV
Paramus High School	Paramus	Paramus Public Schools	Spartans	North I, Group III
Ridgewood High School	Ridgewood	Ridgewood Public Schools	Maroons	North I, Group IV
Teaneck High School	Teaneck	Teaneck Public Schools	Highwaymen (boys); Highwaywomen (girls)	North I, Group III

=== Division B ===
School	Location	School District	Team Name	Classification
Barringer High School	Newark	Newark Public Schools	Blue Bears	North I, Group IV
Nutley High School	Nutley	Nutley Public Schools	Maroon Raiders	North II, Group III
Clifton High School	Clifton	Clifton Public Schools	Mustangs	North I, Group IV
Eastside High School	Paterson	Paterson Public Schools	Ghosts	North I, Group IV
John F. Kennedy High School	Paterson	Paterson Public Schools	Knights	North I, Group IV
Montclair High School	Montclair	Montclair Public Schools	Mounties	North I, Group IV
Passaic High School	Passaic	Passaic City School District	Indians	North I, Group IV

=== Division C ===
School	Location	Team Name	Classification
Bergen Catholic High School	Oradell	Crusaders	Non-Public North A
Don Bosco Preparatory High School	Ramsey	Ironmen	Non-Public North A
Academy of the Holy Angels	Demarest	Angels	Non-Public North A
Immaculate Heart Academy	Washington Township	Blue Eagles	Non-Public North A
Paramus Catholic High School	Paramus	Paladins	Non-Public North A
Saint Joseph Regional High School	Montvale	Green Knights	Non-Public North A

== League sports ==
The Northern New Jersey Interscholastic League allowed member schools to compete in many sports spread out among three seasons. Although the league does not have a cheerleading division, many member schools have their own cheerleading teams. Other sports, such as fencing, are offered by some schools, but like cheerleading, were not part of the NNJIL.

The following is a list of the sports that the NNJIL offered. Each bullet was an individual team (as in one team for girls and one team for boys —not a combined unisex team), but in sports marked with an asterisk (*), these two teams usually practice together (depending on the school) and have almost every if not all of their meets, games, matches, competitions, or other events together. (For example, although the boys and girls track teams from a single school usually practice together and have meets at the same time, there are separate events at their meets for boys and for girls, and therefore, the teams are scored and compete separately.)

=== Fall Sports ===
- Cross Country
- Field Hockey
- Football
- Gymnastics
- Soccer
- Tennis (Girls)
- Volleyball (Girls)

=== Winter sports ===
- Basketball (Boys)
- Basketball (Girls)
- Bowling
- Swimming
- Winter Track
- Wrestling

=== Spring sports ===
- Baseball
- Golf
- Lacrosse
- Softball
- Tennis (Boys)
- Track & Field

== Dissolution of the Conference ==
In 2008, the NJSIAA presented a proposal to realign the major athletic conferences throughout New Jersey. As part of the realignment movement, the NNJIL was disbanded before the 2008–2009 season, and member schools joined three larger conferences, based largely on county affiliations.

Essex County schools Bloomfield, Belleville, Nutley, Montclair and Barringer High Schools joined the new Super Essex Conference, where they remain to this day.

Clifton, Passaic, Paterson Eastside and Paterson Kennedy (representatives from Passaic County), along with Paramus, Hackensack, Teaneck and Ridgewood (Bergen County public schools) and Bergen Catholic, Don Bosco Prep, Immaculate Heart Academy, Academy of the Holy Angels and Saint Joseph Regional (Bergen County Non-Public schools) joined the newly formed North Jersey Tri-County Conference. This new conference comprised schools from Passaic, Bergen and Hudson County.

Paramus Catholic, the last remaining school of the old NNJIL, joined the North Bergen Interscholastic Athletic League (NBIL).

For the 2010 season, the Bergen and Passaic County schools of the North Jersey Tri-County Conference joined with the schools of the former NBIL and Northern Hills Conferences to form the Big North Conference. All Hudson County schools of the North Jersey Tri-County Conference returned to the Hudson County Interscholastic Athletic Association.

== Impact of the NNJIL ==
Many of the high schools that were members of the NNJIL were seen as athletic powerhouses, and numerous state and sectional championships were won by member schools. Fierce rivalries developed in the league, especially in football, where neighboring towns hold decades-long traditional matchups, or where Non-Public schools such as Bergen Catholic and Don Bosco have battled for state championships over the past two decades.

Many of the schools in the NNJIL have been included in the most recent realignment conducted by the NJSIAA as part of the 40-member Big North Conference.

== League Code of Conduct ==
The NNJIL encourages parents and spectators to support good sportsmanship and to be positive role models to student athletes. Smoking is not allowed (per NNJIL rules, some local laws, and state legislation) at NNJIL events. Spectators are asked to "enthusiastically encourage" their own teams, to refrain from booing and using negative remarks, and to applaud "outstanding play" by any team. State and NNJIL regulations prohibit noisemakers, signs, and banners at competitions.
