= Big North Conference (New Jersey) =

High school athletic conference

- Classification: NJSIAA
- Founded: 2009
- No. of teams: 41
- Region: New Jersey

The Big North Conference is a high school athletic conference in New Jersey. It is one of six North Jersey "super athletic conferences" created by the New Jersey State Interscholastic Athletic Association (NJSIAA) in 2009. There are 41 member schools in the Big North Conference, with all members located in either Bergen County or Passaic County, New Jersey.

== History ==
As high school athletics in New Jersey grew in the 1990s and 2000s, problems began to develop in the organization of leagues and conferences. Transportation costs began to grow, as some conferences had teams from as many as four different counties competing against each other. Other conferences were losing competitive balance, as a growth in non-public school enrollment and athletic programs caused tension between non-public and public schools, with public schools accusing non-public schools of recruiting. Conferences also demanded more flexibility in scheduling, as schools felt locked into league and division schedules against opponents either too weak or too strong for true competitive balance.

The strongest tensions were found in the Northern New Jersey Interscholastic League, where public schools who were frustrated by the competitive imbalance with non-public schools, especially Don Bosco Preparatory (Ramsey) and Bergen Catholic (Oradell) in football or Immaculate Heart Academy (Township of Washington) in girls' athletics, threatened to secede from the league.

Therefore, in 2008 the NJSIAA established a "Leagues and Conferences Realignment Committee" to discuss the need for realigning conferences and leagues throughout New Jersey. Their original proposal for schools in northern New Jersey was the creation of six super conferences from the eleven conferences then in existence. While the original proposal was not accepted as presented, it was adjusted and schools realigned yet again, to create the current system in place in New Jersey athletics.

The current realignment started in the 2010–11 school year, after a one-year transition period, when many Big North members schools were part of the North Jersey Tri-County Conference. The NJSIAA had stated that the present system may only go into effect for two to three years, and after a review of the system, a reversion to the old conference alignment may be possible. Athletic Directors in the conference, however, voted in March 2011 to revise the division alignments within the conference for the 2012-2013 academic years and voted against the transfer of DePaul Catholic High School into the North Jersey Interscholastic Conference. Pascack Hills High School initially changed its mind about leaving the NJIC to join the Big North, but subsequently asked to be admitted. The Cowboys became the 41st member of the conference to begin the 2012-13 school year.

== Current schools ==
=== Bergen County Public Schools ===
School	Location	Team Name
Bergen County Technical High School	Hackensack	Knights
Bergenfield High School	Bergenfield	Bears
Cliffside Park High School	Cliffside Park	Red Raiders
Dumont High School	Dumont	Huskies
Dwight Morrow High School	Englewood	Maroon Raiders
Fair Lawn High School	Fair Lawn	Cutters
Fort Lee High School	Fort Lee	Bridgemen
Hackensack High School	Hackensack	Comets
Indian Hills High School	Oakland	Braves
Mahwah High School	Mahwah	Thunderbirds
Northern Highlands Regional High School	Allendale	Highlanders
Northern Valley Regional High School	Demarest	Norsemen
Northern Valley Regional High School	Old Tappan	Golden Knights
Paramus High School	Paramus	Spartans
Pascack Hills High School	Montvale	Broncos
Pascack Valley High School	Hillsdale	Panthers
Ramapo High School	Franklin Lakes	Raiders
Ramsey High School	Ramsey	Rams
Ridgefield Park High School	Ridgefield Park	Scarlets
Ridgewood High School	Ridgewood	Maroons
River Dell Regional High School	Oradell	Golden Hawks
Teaneck High School	Teaneck	Highwaymen
Tenafly High School	Tenafly	Tigers
Westwood Regional High School	Township of Washington	Cardinals

=== Bergen County Non-Public Schools ===
School	Location	Team Name
Academy of the Holy Angels	Demarest	Angels
Bergen Catholic High School	Oradell	Crusaders
Don Bosco Preparatory High School	Ramsey	Ironmen
Immaculate Heart Academy	Township of Washington	Blue Eagles
Paramus Catholic High School	Paramus	Paladins
St. Joseph Regional High School	Montvale	Green Knights

=== Passaic County Public Schools ===
School	Location	Team Name
Clifton High School	Clifton	Mustangs
Eastside High School	Paterson	Ghosts
John F. Kennedy High School	Paterson	Knights
Lakeland Regional High School	Wanaque	Lancers
Passaic County Technical Institute	Wayne	Bulldogs
Passaic High School	Passaic	Indians
Passaic Valley High School	Little Falls	Hornets
Wayne Hills High School	Wayne	Patriots
Wayne Valley High School	Wayne	Indians
West Milford Township High School	West Milford	Highlanders

=== Passaic County Non-Public Schools ===
School	Location	Team Name
DePaul Catholic High School	Wayne	Spartans

== Sports Offered ==
=== Fall Sports ===
- Cross Country
- Field Hockey
- Football
- Gymnastics
- Soccer
- Tennis (Girls)
- Volleyball (Girls)

=== Winter Sports ===
- Basketball (Boys)
- Basketball (Girls)
- Bowling
- Cheerleading
- Ice Hockey
- Swimming
- Winter Track
- Wrestling

=== Spring Sports ===
- Baseball
- Golf
- Lacrosse
- Softball
- Tennis (Boys)
- Track & Field
- Volleyball (Boys)

== Conference Divisions: Football ==
As conference play started in the 2010 academic year, teams were split into six divisions for football purposes, seven divisions for every other sport. The hope in developing the division system is that the system will increase rivalries and promote competitive balance while minimizing travel time between schools within each division.

=== Division I (United) ===
- Bergen Catholic
- DePaul Catholic
- Don Bosco Prep
- Paramus Catholic
- St. Joseph Regional

=== Division II (Liberty) ===
- Clifton
- Eastside (Paterson)
- Fair Lawn
- Kennedy (Paterson)
- Passaic
- Passaic County Technical Institute

=== Division III (Freedom) ===
- Bergen Tech
- Hackensack
- Paramus
- Ridgewood
- Teaneck
- Wayne Hills

=== Division IV (Independence) ===
- Northern Valley-Old Tappan
- Pascack Valley
- Passaic Valley
- Ramapo
- Wayne Valley
- West Milford

=== Division V (National) ===
- Bergenfield
- Indian Hills
- Lakeland
- Northern Highlands
- Northern Valley-Demarest
- Tenafly

=== Division VI (American) ===
- Cliffside Park
- Dumont
- Dwight-Morrow (Englewood)
- Fort Lee
- Ridgefield Park

== Conference Divisions: Other Sports ==
=== United Division ===
- Academy of the Holy Angels^{[G]}
- Bergen Catholic^{[B]}
- DePaul Catholic^{[C]}
- Don Bosco Prep^{[B]}
- Immaculate Heart Academy^{[G]}
- Paramus Catholic^{[C]}
- St. Joseph Regional^{[B]}

^[G]: Girls' athletics only
^[B]: Boys' athletics only
^[C]: Co-Educational

=== Liberty Division ===
- Bergen Tech
- Clifton
- Eastside (Paterson)
- Kennedy (Paterson)
- Passaic
- Passaic County Technical Institute

=== Freedom Division ===
- Fair Lawn
- Hackensack
- Northern Highlands
- Paramus
- Ramapo
- Ridgewood

=== Independence Division ===
- Indian Hills
- Lakeland
- Passaic Valley
- Wayne Hills
- Wayne Valley
- West Milford

=== National Division ===
- Bergenfield
- Northern Valley-Demarest
- Northern Valley-Old Tappan
- Pascack Valley
- Teaneck
- Tenafly

=== Patriot Division ===
- Mahwah
- Pascack Hills
- Ramsey
- River Dell
- Westwood

=== American Division ===
- Cliffside Park
- Dumont
- Dwight Morrow (Englewood)
- Fort Lee
- Ridgefield Park
