= Newark Public Schools =

School district in Essex County, New Jersey, US

Address
- 756 Broad Street Newark, Essex County, New Jersey, 07102; United States
- Coordinates: 40.737868°N 74.171044°W

District information
- Grades: PreK-12
- Superintendent: Roger León
- Business administrator: Valerie Wilson
- Schools: 63
- Affiliation: Former Abbott district

Students and staff
- Enrollment: 40,423 (as of 2020–21)
- Faculty: 2,886.5 FTEs
- Student–teacher ratio: 14.0:1

Other information
- District Factor Group: A
- Website: www.nps.k12.nj.us
Ind.	Per pupil	District spending	Rank (*)	K-12 average	%± vs. average
1A	Total Spending	$24,281	99	$18,891	28.5%
1	Budgetary Cost	17,303	94	14,783	17.0%
2	Classroom Instruction	8,864	57	8,763	1.2%
6	Support Services	3,586	101	2,392	49.9%
8	Administrative Cost	1,857	100	1,485	25.1%
10	Operations & Maintenance	2,675	96	1,783	50.0%
13	Extracurricular Activities	190	27	268	−29.1%
16	Median Teacher Salary	60,709	31	64,043
Data from NJDoE 2014 Taxpayers' Guide to Education Spending. *Of K-12 districts with more than 3,500 students. Lowest spending=1; Highest=103

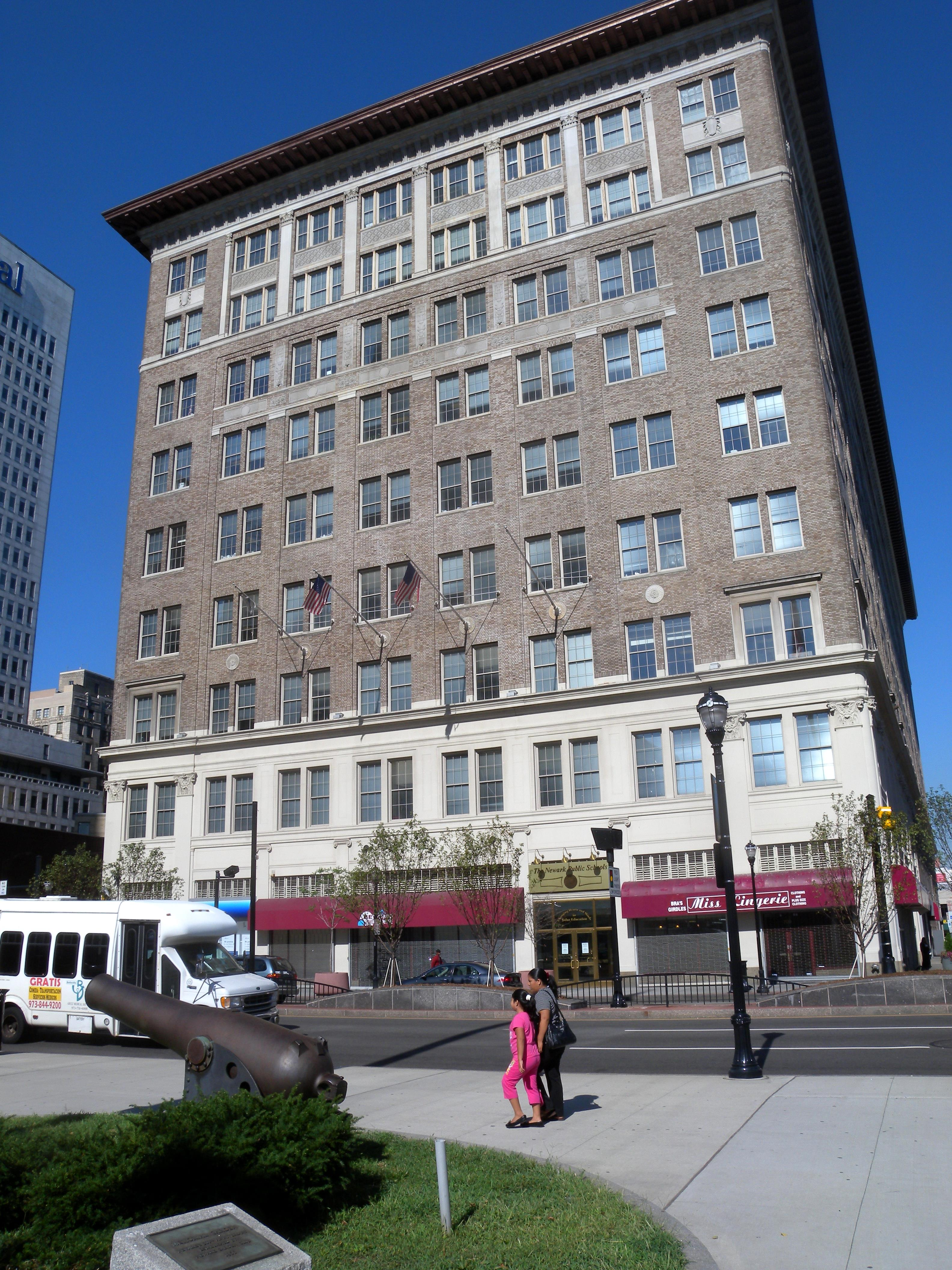
Headquarters

Newark Board of Education is a comprehensive community public school district that serves students in pre-kindergarten through twelfth grade in the city of Newark in Essex County, in the U.S. state of New Jersey. The state took over the district in 1995—the third takeover statewide—and returned control in 2018, after 22 years. The district is one of 31 former Abbott districts statewide that were established pursuant to the decision by the New Jersey Supreme Court in Abbott v. Burke which are now referred to as "SDA Districts" based on the requirement for the state to cover all costs for school building and renovation projects in these districts under the supervision of the New Jersey Schools Development Authority.

As of the 2020–21 school year, the district, comprising 63 schools, had an enrollment of 40,423 students and 2,886.5 classroom teachers (on an FTE basis), for a student–teacher ratio of 14.0:1.

The total school enrollment in Newark city was 75,000 in 2003. Pre-primary school enrollment was 12,000 and elementary or high school enrollment was 46,000 children. College enrollment was 16,000. As of 2003, 64% of people 25 years and over had at least graduated from high school and 11% had a bachelor's degree or higher. Among people 16 to 19 years old, 10 percent were dropouts; they were not enrolled in school and had not graduated from high school.

== History ==
In 1948 schools were racially integrated. There were black teachers, all of whom classified by the district as "permanent substitutes", teaching all grade levels.

The district is one of three districts in New Jersey (along with Jersey City Public Schools and Paterson Public Schools) that has historically been under "state intervention", which authorizes the state Commissioner of Education to intervene in governance of a local public school district (and to intervene in the areas of instruction and program, operations, personnel, and fiscal management). Chris Cerf was the state appointed superintendent of Newark. Cerf said he would resign on February 1, 2018, the day local control was returned to the district.

Roger León, a life-long Newark resident and educator, was elected by the local school board to replace Cerf by a unanimous 9-0 vote and took office July 1, 2018.

In a referendum held as part of the November 2018 general election, voters chose by a 3-1 margin to have the district function as Type II district, in which the board of education is elected by the residents of the city.

The district had been classified by the New Jersey Department of Education as being in District Factor Group "A", the lowest of eight groupings. District Factor Groups organize districts statewide to allow comparison by common socioeconomic characteristics of the local districts. From lowest socioeconomic status to highest, the categories are A, B, CD, DE, FG, GH, I and J.

== Administration ==
Core members of the district's administration are:

- Roger León, district superintendent of schools
- Valerie Wilson, school business administrator

=== Board of education ===
The district's board of education, comprised of nine members, sets policy and oversees the fiscal and educational operation of the district through its administration. As a Type II school district, the board's trustees are elected directly by voters to serve three-year terms of office on a staggered basis, with three seats up for election each year held as part of the April school election. The board appoints a superintendent to oversee the district's day-to-day operations and a business administrator to supervise the business functions of the district. Of the nearly 600 school districts statewide, Newark is one of 12 districts with school elections in April, in which voters also decide on passage of the annual school budget.

Members of the board of education are Hasani K. Council (President), Allison K. James-Frison (Co-Vice President), Vereliz Santana (Co-Vice President), Kanileah Anderson, David I. Daughety, Josephine C. Garcia, Louis Maisonave Jr., Melissa Reed and Helena Vinhas

The Newark City Council voted in January 2024 to lower the minimum voting age in school board elections to 16, effective April 2024.

=== State intervention ===
The district was one of three districts in New Jersey historically under "state intervention", which authorizes the commissioner of education to intervene in governance of a local public school district (and to intervene in the areas of instruction and program, operations, personnel, and fiscal management) if the commissioner has determined that a school district failed or was unable to take corrective actions necessary to establish a thorough and efficient system of education.

State intervention has been criticized as undemocratic and racist. Some also have suggested that children were significantly harmed during state control. State intervention in Newark has not produced significant gains after more than two decades of state control. When viewed through the lens of student growth percentiles, which is a contested measure of growth, NPS may be higher. However, NPS may have had equally high growth before state intervention, so no comparisons are possible.

Chris Cerf and others paid by the state of New Jersey have suggested state control has been good for Newark. However, no measures of the quality of NPS's broad offerings before, during, or after state intervention have been identified. No measures of progress are available for earth science, physics, biology, chemistry, health, citizenship, world history, US history, literature, sociology, anthropology, ethnic studies, New Jersey history, gender studies, media studies, Africana studies, economics, politics, astronomy, geology, philosophy, archaeology, or performing arts. No measures of students' physical wellbeing, social wellbeing, or emotional wellbeing are available before, during, or after state control. No measures of parental wellbeing have been identified.

Local control was returned as of February 1, 2018.

== Performance ==
The Newark Public Schools is the largest school system in New Jersey. The city's public schools had been among the lowest-performing in the state, even after the state government took over management of the city's schools from 1995-2018, which was done under the presumption that improvement would follow.

Although the school district continues to struggle with low high school graduation rates and low standardized test scores, the former mayor of Newark, Cory Booker, insisted in 2010, "Newark, New Jersey can become one of the first American cities to solve the crisis in public education." This vision for better school district is also shared by Facebook founder Mark Zuckerberg, who made a $100 million donation to Newark Public Schools in 2010. "Every child deserves a good education. Right now that's not happening," he said. The management has been criticized: while interviews with administration regarding Newark's schools were always positive, highlighting only the good aspects of the huge monetary donation, new contracts were being created, money was being hemorrhaged, and the district was going broke. According to The New Yorker, Anderson, Booker, Zuckerberg, and Christie, "despite millions of dollars spent on community engagement—have yet to hold tough, open conversations with the people of Newark about exactly how much money the district has, where it is going, and what students aren't getting as a result."

== Awards, recognition and rankings ==
Ann Street School of Mathematics and Science was awarded the Blue Ribbon School Award of Excellence by the United States Department of Education, the highest award an American school can receive, during the 1998-99 school year.

Branch Brook Elementary School, a Pre-Kindergarten through 4th grade school, was awarded the Blue Ribbon School Award of Excellence, during the 2004-05 school year.

During the 2007–08 school year, Harriet Tubman School was recognized with the Blue Ribbon School Award of Excellence by the United States Department of Education.

During the 2009-10 school year, Science Park High School was awarded the Blue Ribbon School Award of Excellence.

For the 2005-06 school year, the district was recognized with the "Best Practices Award" by the New Jersey Department of Education for its "A Park Study: Learning About the World Around Us" Science program at Abington Avenue School. The curriculum was written, implemented, and submitted to the State of New Jersey by Abington Avenue School kindergarten teacher, Lenore Furman.

After efforts at his dismissal as New Jersey's poet laureate, Amiri Baraka was named the school district's poet laureate in December 2002.

== Schools ==
Schools in the district (with 2020–21 enrollment data from the National Center for Education Statistics) are:

=== Preschools ===
- Early Childhood Center - Central (154; PreK)
  - Yolonda Severe, principal/executive director
- Early Childhood Center - North (128; PreK)
  - David DeOliveira, principal
- Early Childhood Center - South (180; PreK)
  - Yolonda Severe, principal/executive director

=== Elementary schools ===
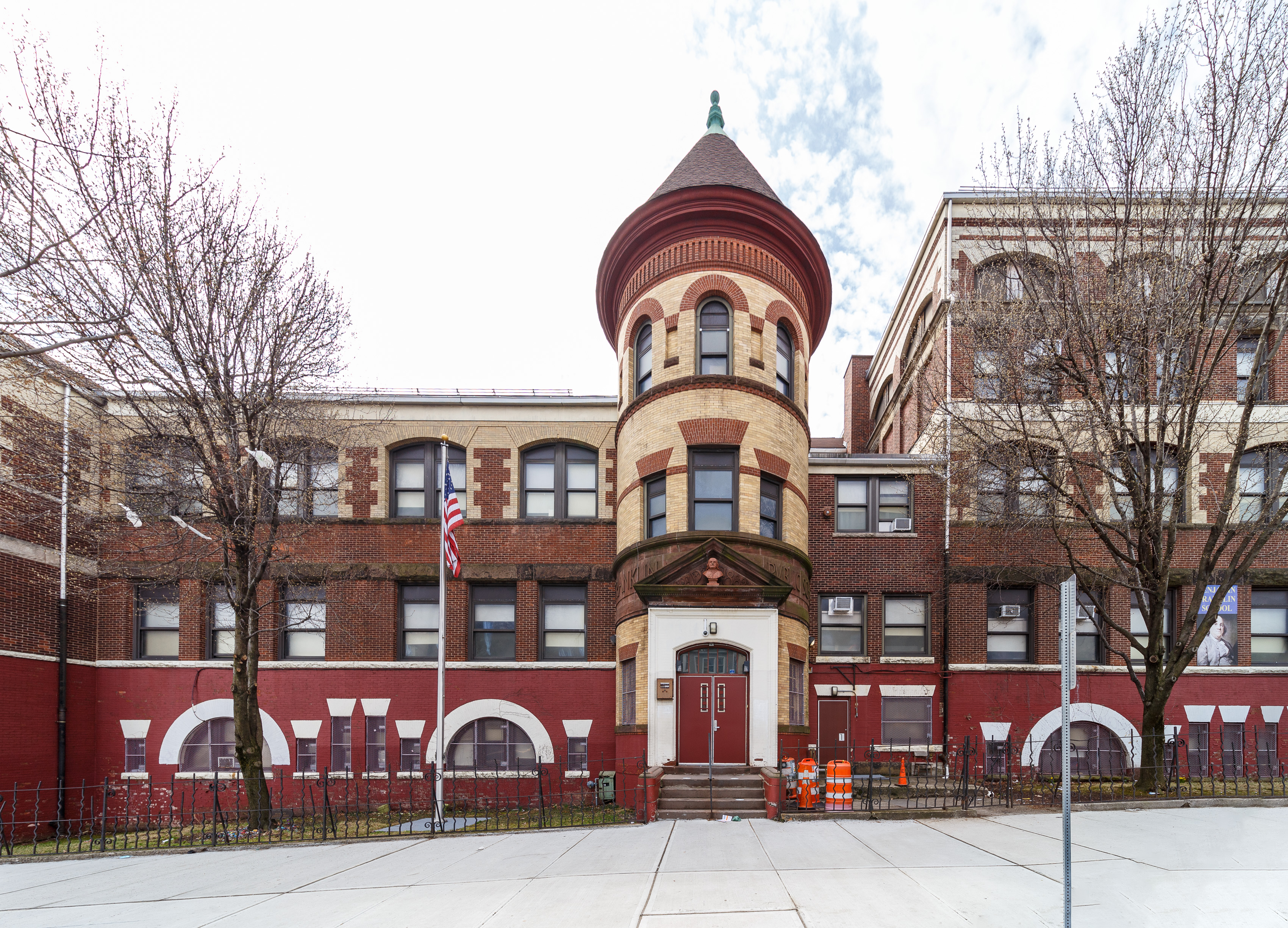
Franklin Elementary, built 1889

- Abington Avenue School (879; PreK-8)
  - Alejandro Echevarria, principal
- Ann Street School (1,243; KG-8)
  - Isabel Marques, principal
- Avon Avenue Elementary School (551; K-8)
  - Kinyetta Bird, principal
- Belmont Runyon Elementary School (451; PK-8)
  - Robin L. Williams, principal
- Benjamin Franklin Elementary School (616; PK-7)
- Bruce Street School for the Deaf (58; PreK-8)
  - Malcolm Terrell, principal
- Camden Street Elementary School (596; PreK-8)
  - Samuel Garrison, principal
- Roberto Clemente School (678; PreK-7)
  - Claudio Barbaran, principal
- George Washington Carver School (508; PK-8)
  - Malcolm Terrell, principal
- Chancellor Avenue School (500; KG-8)
  - Kashon Lopes, principal
- Cleveland Elementary School (418; PK-8)
  - Claire Emmanuel, Acting principal
- East Ward Elementary School (383; PK-8)
  - Rosa Monteiro-Inacio, principal
- Elliott Street Elementary School (954; PK-8)
  - Andres Barquin, principal
- First Avenue School (1,139; PK-8)
  - Neysa Miranda, principal
- Fourteenth Avenue School (112; PK-8)
  - Armando Cepero, principal
- Dr. E. Alma Flagg School (433; KG-8)
  - Filipa Alexandra Silva, principal
- Hawkins Street School (675; KG-8)
  - Alejandro Lopez, principal
- Hawthorne Avenue School (466; PK-8)
  - H. Grady James IV, principal
- Rafael Hernandez School (704; PreK-8)
  - Jessica Rios, principal
- Dr. William H. Horton School (742; K-8)
  - Marvelis Perreira, principal
- Ivy Hill School (517; PK-8)
  - Dorrice Rayam-Johnson, principal
- Lafayette Street School (1,202; PK-8)
  - Diane Pereira, principal
- Lincoln Elementary School (394; PK-8)
  - Hillary Dow, principal
- Michelle Obama Elementary School (PK-2)
  - LaShanda Gilliam, principal
- Luis Muñoz Marín School (802; PK-8)
  - Kenneth Montalbano, principal
- McKinley Elementary School (785; PK-8)
  - Dr. Lynnette Dortrait, principal
- Mount Vernon School (816; PK-8)
  - Serenia Farrell, principal
- Oliver Street School (1080; PreK-8)
  - Luis Henriques, principal
- Park Elementary School (848; PreK-8)
  - Amy Panitch, principal
- Peshine Academy (642; PreK-8)
  - Ganiat Rufai, principal
- Quitman Street School (546; PreK-8)
- Ridge Street School (637; K-8)
  - David DeOliveira, principal
- Sir Isaac Newton Elementary School (57; PK-2)
- South Seventeenth Street School (354; K-8)
  - Clarence Allen, principal
- South Street School (798; PK-5)
  - Sandra Cruz, principal
- Speedway Academies (579; K-8)
  - Atiba Buckman, principal
- Louise A. Spencer School (738; PK-8)
  - Karla Venezia, principal
- Sussex Avenue School (426; PK-8)
  - Ryshan Johnson, principal
- Thirteenth Avenue School / Dr. Martin Luther King Jr. School (619; PreK-8)
  - Thalia Brownridge-Smith, principal
- Harriet Tubman School (373; PK-8)
  - Angela Davis, principal
- Salomé Ureña Elementary School (368; PreK-7)
  - Liana Rodriguez, principal
- Wilson Avenue School (1,135; K-8)
  - Margarita Hernandez, principal

=== High schools ===
High schools in the district (with 2020–21 enrollment data from the National Center for Education Statistics) are:

- Newark Arts High School (614; 9-12)
  - Regina Sharpe, principal
- American History High School (445; 9-12)
  - Margaret Murray, principal
- Barringer High School (1,600; 9-12)
  - Natasha Pared, principal
- Bard High School Early College Newark (406; 9-12)
  - Dr. David Cutts, principal
- Central High School (729; 9-12)
  - Terri V. Mitchell, principal
- Eagle Academy for Young Men (197; 6-12)
  - Semone Morant, principal
- East Side High School (2,024; 9-12)
  - Carlos M. Rodriguez, principal
- Malcolm X Shabazz High School (360; 9-12)
  - Atiba Buckman, principal
- Newark Evening High School (; 9-12)
  - Andre Hollis, director
- Newark School of Data Science and Information Technology (9)
  - Liana Summey, principal
- Newark School of Global Studies (9)
  - Nelson Ruiz, principal
- Newark School of Fashion Design (9)
  - Sakina Pitts, principal
- Newark Vocational High School (388; 9-11)
  - Marisa DeSantis, principal
- Science Park High School (868; 7-12)
  - Darleen Gearhart, principal
- Technology High School (685; 9-12)
  - Edwin Reyes, principal
- University High School (486; 7-12)
  - Genique Flournoy-Hamilton, principal
- Weequahic High School (385; 9-12)
  - Kyle Thomas, principal
- West Side High School (620; 9-12)
  - Akbar Cook, principal

=== Ungraded ===
- John F. Kennedy School (143; PK-12)
  - Jill Summers-Phillips, principal
- New Jersey Regional Day School - Newark (122; KG-12)
  - Larry Ramkissoon, principal

== School uniforms ==
Beginning in the 2008-2009 school year, students in elementary and middle school were required to wear school uniforms. Beginning in September 2010 high school students were required to wear uniforms.
