= New Jersey State Interscholastic Athletic Association =

High school sports association

- Abbreviation: NJSIAA
- Formation: 1918
- Type: Volunteer; Non-Profit Organization
- Legal status: Association
- Purpose: Athletic/Educational
- Headquarters: 1161 Route 130; Robbinsville, New Jersey 08691
- Region served: New Jersey
- Members: 425 high schools
- Executive Director: Colleen Maguire
- Affiliations: National Federation of State High School Associations
- Staff: 16
- Website: njsiaa.org

The New Jersey State Interscholastic Athletic Association (NJSIAA) is an association of hundreds of high schools in the U.S. state of New Jersey. It regulates high school athletics and holds tournaments and crowns champions in a variety of sanctioned sports.

== State championships ==
In order for schools to move on to the state championship, they must achieve a winning percentage of .500 or greater by a pre-set date (the "cut–off" date). Football, wrestling and bowling are the only sports where a school may have a .500 record and not qualify for the postseason. For football and wrestling, it is only the best eight schools in each section that move on. This is determined by power points, awarded to each game's winning team and based on the size of the school that is defeated and the score of the game. Winning percentage alone, however, is not sufficient to qualify for the playoffs. If a school's team has too many disqualifications, it is disqualified from the state championship. In bowling the top 2 teams in each division (North I, Group I; North I Group II, etc.) in the State Sectional Tournament, qualify for State Finals.

When a team wins its sectional championship, it is awarded a blue trophy on which is noted the section and the sport. For public schools, the two North Jersey winners face off against one another, while the South and Central teams play each other in the statewide semi-finals. The two winning teams then play each other for the statewide Group championship. For non-public schools, the two section winners compete in the state Non-Public championship; the champion receives a gold trophy.

For some sports, each group's state champion play each other in the Tournament of Champions for the overall state championship and #1 state ranking. For boys, the tournament is offered in basketball, bowling, cross country, golf, lacrosse, tennis, track-indoor, track-outdoor, and volleyball. For girls, the sports are basketball, bowling, cross country, field hockey, lacrosse, tennis, indoor and outdoor track, and volleyball.

In some sports, there are no group championships. In these sports — all schools, public and non-public alike — compete for a single state championship. For boys, the sports are fencing and golf. For girls, they are fencing, golf, and gymnastics.

Student athletes may also be state champions. The sports that offer individual state championships are bowling, cross country, fencing, golf, gymnastics, tennis (singles and doubles), swimming, diving, indoor and outdoor track, and wrestling. All of these sports — except gymnastics (girls only) produce both male and female individual champions.

A proposal to create a Group V designation in the four public school sections Northern Highlands Regional High School was approved by the NJSIAA executive committee by a vote of 22-5-3 at its meeting in Robbinsville, according to Jack DuBois, NJSIAA assistant director in charge of football. In addition to Group I, Group II, Group III and Group IV, we now have a Group V for football that would include the 15 largest schools in the four regions. With the addition of Group V, 160 public schools (up from 128) would be eligible for the playoffs and an additional 28 games would be played in the sectional tournaments.

== Current conferences ==
- Big North Conference
- Burlington County Scholastic League
- Cape-Atlantic League
- Colonial Conference
- Colonial Valley Conference
- Greater Middlesex Conference
- Hudson County Interscholastic League
- Northwest Jersey Athletic Conference
- North Jersey Interscholastic Conference
- Olympic Conference
- Shore Conference
- Super Essex Conference
- Skyland Conference
- Tri-County Conference
- Union County Interscholastic Athletic Conference
- New Jersey Association of Independent Schools

== Conferences realignment ==
On August 11, 2008, the NJSIAA released an official proposal for a realignment of athletic conferences located in Central and North Jersey. The proposal affects over 200 NJSIAA high schools in 31 conference divisions, making it the single largest realignment in state history. The result is six "super" conferences according to geography. A seventh, football-only conference would also be created for teams from two of the new super conferences. Not affected by this move are schools located in Mercer, Monmouth, and Middlesex counties as well as all of South Jersey.

Multiple reasons account for the super conferences realignment. First, the plan was triggered by dissatisfaction with competitive balance between schools, particularly in the football programs in public and non-public schools in the northern part of the state. It would allow schools more flexibility with whom they schedule for such events. Second, new enrollment totals and rates have vastly changed since the conferences were set up 27 years ago, and therefore have not adequately met the needs of all the schools. A final catalyst is the economy; the move would create cheaper overall traveling expenses.

The realignment by the NJSIAA has garnered very mixed reactions among the high schools that it would affect. For instance, Eastside High School, which has traditionally been beaten handily in athletic competition, endorses the move. Meanwhile, Summit High School has enjoyed great success in their conference and sees no need to part ways. Other schools generally share one of these two views.

The NJSIAA undertook a major realignment of conferences in the northern part of the state in 2009 and 2010. The main impetus for realigning the league's listed below into six superconferences with multiple divisions each was to defuse tension between public and private schools in the area, which had risen to the point that the public schools attempted to force the private schools into their own separate conferences.

=== List of conferences defunct under 2009–10 NJSIAA realignment ===
- Bergen County Scholastic League (annexed into Big North and North Jersey in 2010)
- Bergen-Passaic Scholastic League (annexed into North Jersey in 2010)
- Colonial Hills Conference (annexed into Northwest Jersey and Super Essex in 2009)
- Iron Hills Conference (annexed by Northwest Jersey, Super Essex, and Union County in 2009)
- Mountain Valley Conference (annexed into Super Essex and Union County in 2009)
- North Bergen Interscholastic Athletic League (annexed into Big North in 2010)
- North Jersey Tri-County Conference (2009-10 only, annexed into Big North and revived Hudson County in 2010)
- Northern Hills Conference (annexed by North Jersey Tri-County and Super Essex in 2009)
- Northern New Jersey Interscholastic League (annexed into North Jersey Tri-County and Super Essex in 2009)
- Sussex County Interscholastic League (annexed into Northwest Jersey in 2009)
- Watchung Conference (annexed by North Jersey Tri-County, Super Essex, and Union County in 2009)

== Technology forerunner ==
In 2018, the NJSIAA become the first state governing body to sanction the use of video replay during high school football's regular season.

== Participation ==
In the 2024–25 season, the NJSIAA featured 282,244 participants, with 58% boys and 42% girls.

The sports with most boys are:
- American football: 22,642
- Track and field (outdoor): 20,263
- Soccer: 20,007
- Basketball: 13,379
- Track and field (indoor): 13,480
- Baseball: 13,321
- Wrestling: 12,040

The sports with most girls are:

- Track and field (outdoor): 17,290
- Soccer: 13,109
- Volleyball: 12,212
- Track and field (indoor): 10,859
- Softball: 9,837
- Basketball: 8,828
- Lacrosse: 8,330
