= Marc Roberts =

Marc Roberts may refer to:

- Marc Roberts (singer) (born 1968), Irish singer-songwriter and radio broadcaster
- Marc Roberts (footballer) (born 1990), English footballer
- Marc Roberts (politician), member of the Utah House of Representatives
- Marc Roberts (sports agent) (born 1959), basketball player and sports agent
- Marc Roberts, health policy analyst, see health care reform

== See also ==
- Mark Roberts (disambiguation)
