= Mark Roberts =

Mark, Marc or Marcus Roberts may refer to:

== Creative artists ==
- Mark Roberts (actor) (1921–2006), American stage, film and television performer
- Mark Roberts (TV producer) (born 1961), American television actor and writer
- Marcus Roberts (born 1963), American jazz pianist, composer and bandleader
- Mark Roberts (musician) (born 1967), Welsh singer with Catatonia
- Marc Roberts (singer) (born 1968), Irish songwriter and radio broadcaster

== Sportsmen ==
- Marc Roberts (sports agent) (born 1959), American basketball player and entrepreneur
- Mark Roberts (Australian footballer) (born 1965), Australian rules defender and forward
- Mark Roberts (footballer, born 1975), Scottish striker and coach
- Mark Roberts (rugby league) (born 1982), Welsh second-row and centre
- Mark Roberts (footballer, born 1983), English centre-back
- Marc Roberts (footballer) (born 1990), English defender with Barnsley

== Others ==
- Marc J. Roberts (1943–2014), American health policy analyst (Control knobs theory)
- Mark Roberts (archaeologist) (born 1961), English Palaeolithic and Pleistocene prehistorian
- Mark Roberts (streaker) (born 1964), English naked runner at international events
- Mark Roberts (businessman), Welsh buyer of sixty UK aristocratic titles
- Marc Roberts (politician), American member of the Utah House of Representatives between 2013 and 2020

== See also ==
- Mark Robertson (disambiguation)
