= East Side High School (Newark, New Jersey) =

High school in Newark, New Jersey, United States

Location
- 238 Van Buren Street; Newark, Essex County, New Jersey 07105; United States
- Coordinates: 40.724107°N 74.159538°W

Information
- Type: Public high school
- Established: April 1, 1911; 115 years ago
- School district: Newark Public Schools
- NCES School ID: 341134002194
- Principal: Carlos Rodriguez
- Faculty: 134.5 FTEs
- Grades: 9-12
- Enrollment: 2,046 (as of 2024–25)
- Student to teacher ratio: 15.2:1
- Colors: Red and white
- Athletics conference: Super Essex Conference (general); North Jersey Super Football Conference (football)
- Team name: Red Raiders
- Rival: West Side High School
- Accreditation: Middle States Association of Colleges and Schools
- Website: www.nps.k12.nj.us/EAS/

East Side High School is a four-year public high school in Newark in Essex County, in the U.S. state of New Jersey, operating as part of the Newark Public Schools. The school serves the city's Ironbound neighborhood. The school has been accredited by the Middle States Association of Colleges and Schools Commission on Elementary and Secondary Schools since 1929 and is accredited until January 2026.

As part of the East Side Opportunity Program, students can take Advanced Placement or International Baccalaureate programs, and can earn an associate degree from Essex County College with courses taken in 11th and 12th grades.

As of the 2024–25 school year, the school had an enrollment of 2,046 students and 134.5 classroom teachers (on an FTE basis), for a student–teacher ratio of 15.2:1. There were 1,350 students (66.0% of enrollment) eligible for free lunch and 229 (11.2% of students) eligible for reduced-cost lunch.

== History ==
The planned opening date for the school was February 1, 1911, which was delayed to April 1, with about 250 students beginning classes at was initially called the East Side Commercial and Manual Training High School.

The school building, originally constructed in 1911 and expanded on three occasions, covers a total of 302,000 square feet (28,100 m^{2}) of space. A 2005 analysis performed as part of the district's Long Range Facilities Plan recommended construction of a new building and conversion of the existing structure into an elementary school. A 2012 review of the building performed by the district found that portions of the original "antiquated" 1911 building and one of the earlier expansions were "obsolete and in poor condition".

== Awards, recognition and rankings ==
The school was the 316th-ranked public high school in New Jersey out of 339 schools statewide in New Jersey Monthly magazine's September 2014 cover story on the state's "Top Public High Schools", using a new ranking methodology. The school had been ranked 319th in the state of 328 schools in 2012, after being ranked 293rd in 2010 out of 322 schools listed. The magazine ranked the school 301st in 2008 out of 316 schools. The school was also ranked 301st in the magazine's September 2006 issue, which surveyed 316 schools across the state.

== Athletics ==
The East Side High School Red Raiders compete in the Super Essex Conference, which is comprised of public and private high schools in Essex County and was established following a reorganization of sports leagues in Northern New Jersey by the New Jersey State Interscholastic Athletic Association (NJSIAA). Prior to the 2010 reorganization, the school had competed in the Watchung Conference, which included public and private high schools in Essex, Hudson and Union counties in northern New Jersey. With 1,542 students in grades 10–12, the school was classified by the NJSIAA for the 2019–20 school year as Group IV for most athletic competition purposes, which included schools with an enrollment of 1,060 to 5,049 students in that grade range. The football team competes in the Liberty Red division of the North Jersey Super Football Conference, which includes 112 schools competing in 20 divisions, making it the nation's biggest football-only high school sports league. The school was classified by the NJSIAA as Group V North for football for 2024–2026, which included schools with 1,317 to 5,409 students.

The school offers the only ice hockey program at any Newark public high school. The school offers the city's only public high school lacrosse team. The ice hockey team won the Handchen Cup in 1985.

The boys track team won the indoor relay championship in Group IV in 1981.

The boys cross country team won the Group IV state championship in 1984 and 1988.

The girls cross country team won the Group IV state championship in 1984.

The boys indoor track team won the Group IV indoor relay state championship in 1991.

The boys' basketball team won the Group IV state championship in 2002 (against Shawnee High School in the finals), and won the Group III championship in 2013 (vs. Camden High School), 2014 (vs. Ewing High School) and again Group IV in 2019 (vs. Freehold Township High School). From 2001 to 2025, the team has won twelve Newark Public Schools Christmas Tournament Championships, six Essex County championships, six sectional titles and a four state championships under coaches Anthony Tavares and Bryant Garvin. Led by future NBA guard Randy Foye, the 2002 team defeated Shawnee by a score of 50–47 to win the Group IV championship game played at the Louis Brown Athletic Center and came into the Tournament of Champions as the third seed, defeating sixth-seeded Burlington City High School 90–70 in the quarterfinals before falling to Neptune High School by a score of 71–63 in the semis to finish the season at 29–2, losing their first game of the season to ToC champion St. Anthony High School and their last game to ToC runner-up Neptune. The team started off the 2014 championship game with a 25–9 run on its way to winning the Group IV title with an 83–56 win against Ewing High School. The 2019 team won the Group IV title with a 69–44 win against Freehold Township in the championship game.

Until a 32–30 win against Belleville High School in September 2017, the football team had a 55-game losing streak, thought to be the longest in state history, which dated back to an October 2011 win against crosstown rival West Side High School and included five seasons in which the team didn't win a single game.

== Controversy ==
In June 2007, the Newark Public Schools superintendent made the decision to block out a kiss between two male students out of the high school's yearbook. New Jersey gay rights group, Garden State Equality, demanded that the superintendent publicly apologize, saying "The school district's erasure of this student and his boyfriend is a tragic metaphor of the school district trying to erase the lesbian and gay community from its schools, and we won't stand for it." By the end of June, the district changed its mind about the photo, issuing a statement in which it apologized to Jackson, stated that copies of the yearbook would be reissued and affirming that the district respects its diversity and "supports all our students, regardless of race, gender, ethnic background or sexual orientation".

== Administration ==
The school's principal is Carlos Rodriguez. His core administration team includes five vice principals.

== Notable alumni ==
- Mike Barca (born 1954), soccer goalkeeper who played professionally in the North American Soccer League, American Soccer League and Major Indoor Soccer League
- Heinie Benkert (1901–1972), professional running back who played in the NFL for the New York Giants and the Orange/Newark Tornadoes
- Harry L. Ettlinger (1926–2018), one of the Monuments Men during World War II whose efforts were portrayed on film in The Monuments Men
- John Filak (1903–1954), football player who played in the National Football League for the Frankford Yellow Jackets
- Randy Foye (born 1983), color commentator who played in the NBA for the Denver Nuggets
- Frank Grant (born 1950), former NFL wide receiver who played for the Washington Redskins and Tampa Bay Buccaneers
- Golden E. Johnson (1944–2010), politician and jurist who was the first African American woman to serve as a Municipal Court Judge in Newark
- James Lordi (1910–1985), politician who served in the New Jersey General Assembly from 1970 to 1972
- Joseph P. Lordi (1919 –1983), law enforcement official who served as the Essex County, New Jersey prosecutor and as the first Chairman of the New Jersey Casino Control Commission
- Honey Lott (1925–1980), Negro league outfielder who played for the New York Black Yankees
- Dina Matos (born 1966), former First Lady of New Jersey who had been married to Governor Jim McGreevey
- Charles Anthony Micchelli (born 1942), mathematician who has focused on numerical analysis, approximation theory, and machine learning
- Elijah Olaniyi (born 1999), college basketball player for the Stony Brook Seawolves
- Telmo Pires (born 1972), professional soccer player
- Camille Sabie (1902–1998), athlete who represented the United States at the 1922 Women's World Games, winning gold medals in the 110 yd hurdles and standing long jump and a bronze medal in the conventional long jump
- Ismael Sanogo (born 1996), professional basketball player for Maroussi of the Greek Basketball League
- Boban Savović (born 1979), former professional basketball player
- David Smukler (1914–1971), fullback / linebacker who played in the NFL for the Philadelphia Eagles
- Sarah Vaughan (1924–1990), jazz singer
- Hassan Whiteside (born 1989), professional basketball player who played for the Miami Heat of the National Basketball Association
