= Dukan =

Dukan may refer to:

== Nutrition ==
- Dukan Diet, a high-protein low-carbohydrate fad diet

== People ==
- Dukan (name), multiple people

== Places ==
- Dukan Dam, dam constructed in 1959 in Kurdistan Region, Iraq
- Dukan District, district in Kurdistan Region, Iraq
- Lake Dukan, lake in Kurdistan Region, Iraq

== See also ==
- Dukaan, 2024 Indian film
