= Newark Early College High School =

High school in Newark, New Jersey, United States

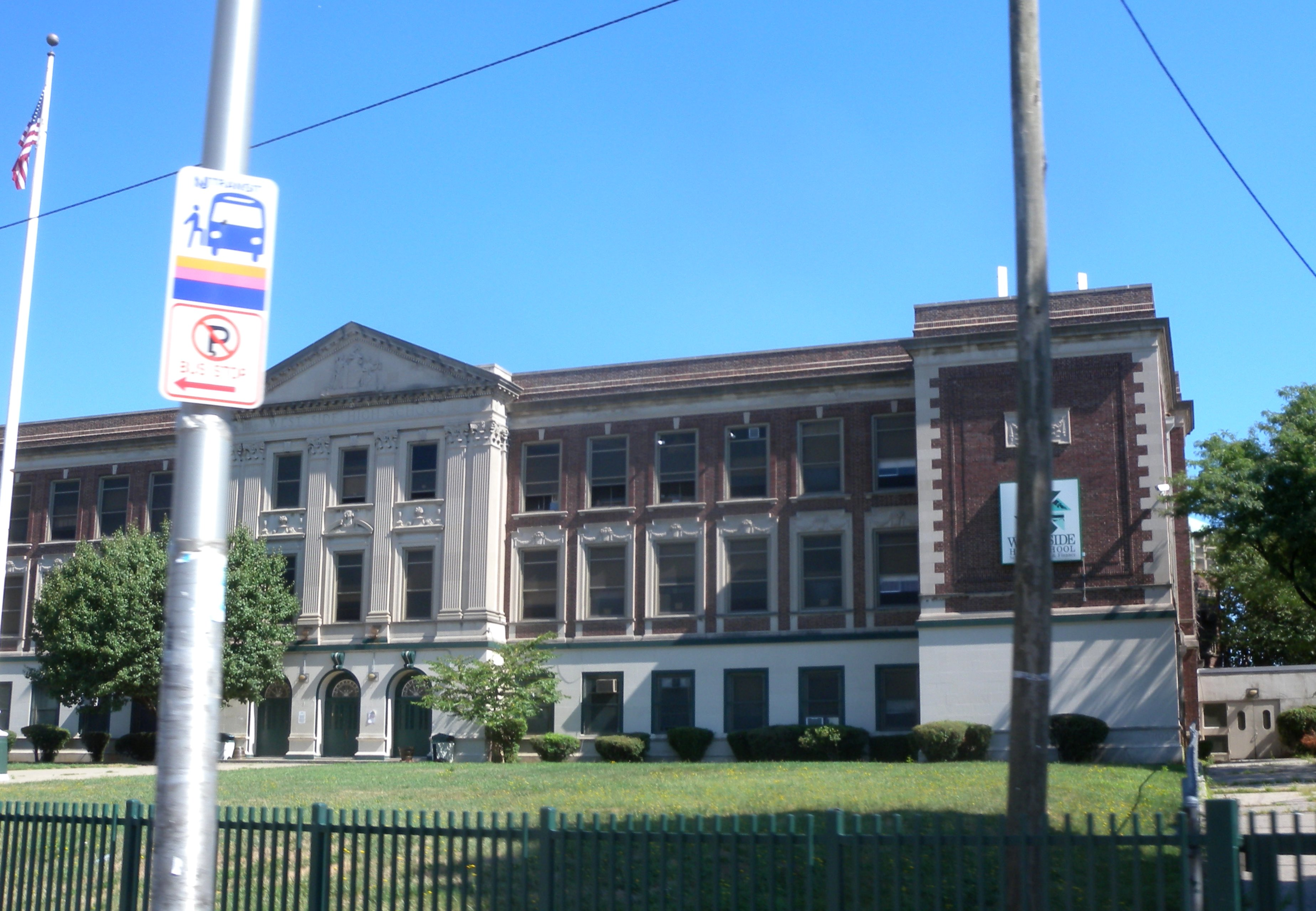

Location
- 403 South Orange Avenue; Newark, Essex County, New Jersey 07103; United States
- Coordinates: 40.741149°N 74.20292°W

Information
- Type: Public high school
- School district: Newark Public Schools
- Principal: Larry Ramkinsoon
- Faculty: 41.0 FTEs
- Grades: 7-12
- Enrollment: 469 (as of 2015-16)
- Student to teacher ratio: 11.4:1
- Colors: Green and white
- Athletics conference: Super Essex Conference
- Team name: Roughriders
- Website: www.nps.k12.nj.us/wsd/nec/

Newark Early College High School is a six-year comprehensive community public high school in Newark, in Essex County, New Jersey, United States, serving students in ninth through twelfth grades, and operating as part of the Newark Public Schools. Together with Newark Vocational High School, the school is one of two high schools operated on the West Side Campus.

As of the 2015-16 school year, the school had an enrollment of 469 students and 41.0 classroom teachers (on an FTE basis), for a student–teacher ratio of 11.4:1. There were 302 students (64.4% of enrollment) eligible for free lunch and 13 (2.8% of students) eligible for reduced-cost lunch.

== Athletics ==
The two schools share a sports program under the banner of the West Side High School Roughriders compete in the Super Essex Conference, following a reorganization of sports leagues in Northern New Jersey by the New Jersey State Interscholastic Athletic Association (NJSIAA). With a combined enrollment of 728 students in grades 10-12, the school was classified by the NJSIAA for the 2019–20 school year as Group II for most athletic competition purposes, which included schools with an enrollment of 486 to 758 students in that grade range. West Side was classified by the NJSIAA as Group III North for football for 2018–2020.
