= Christ the King Preparatory School (New Jersey) =

Catholic school in Newark, New Jersey, United States

Location
- 239 Woodside Avenue; Newark, (Essex County), New Jersey 07104; United States; 40°46′27″N 74°9′53″W

Information
- Type: Private, coeducational
- Motto: "The School That Works"
- Religious affiliation: Roman Catholic
- Established: 2007
- NCES School ID: A1101473
- President: Fr. Bob Sandoz, OFM
- Dean: Charles Syby
- Principal: Fr. Gregory Gebbia, OFM
- Faculty: 16.6 FTEs
- Grades: 9–12
- Student to teacher ratio: 12.7:1
- Colors: Blue and Gray
- Athletics conference: Super Essex Conference
- Sports: Basketball, soccer, volleyball, track, cross country, bowling, golf, cheerleading, softball, swimming, wrestling
- Mascot: Knights
- Nickname: CTK
- Team name: Knights
- Tuition: $2,700 (2016-17)
- Affiliation: Cristo Rey Network
- Admissions: Director, Veronica Ortega
- Athletics: Director, Robert Kearns
- Website: cristoreynewark.org
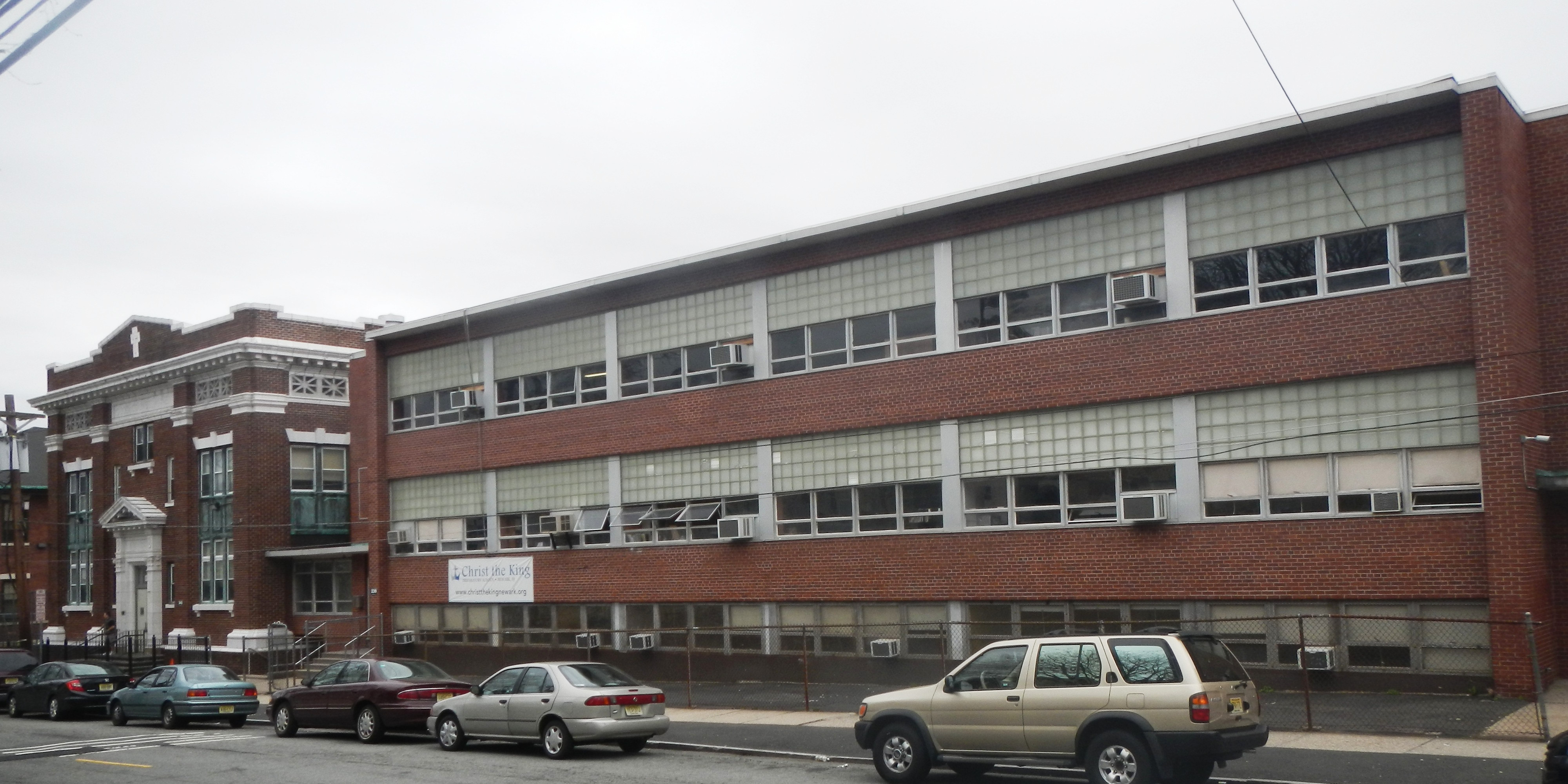

Christ The King Preparatory School, later known as Cristo Rey Newark High School, was a private, Roman Catholic high school in Newark, New Jersey. The school opened in the 2007 school year with an initial freshman class of 100 students, and operated within the Roman Catholic Archdiocese of Newark.

As of the 2019–20 school year, the school had an enrollment of 210 students and 16.6 classroom teachers (on an FTE basis), for a student–teacher ratio of 12.7:1. The school's student body was 45.7% (96) Black, 45.7% (96) Hispanic, 4.8% (10) two or more races, 1.9% (4) Native Hawaiian/ Pacific Islander, 1.4% (3) Asian and 0.5% (1) White.

On May 7, 2020, the Archdiocese of Newark stated that the school would permanently close at the end of the academic year.

== Background ==
The school operated on the site of the former Our Lady of Good Counsel High School, which closed in June 2006.

Christ The King Preparatory School opened in August 2007 and graduated its first class in 2011. It is part of the Cristo Rey Network of high schools nationwide, the original being Cristo Rey Jesuit High School in Chicago. The president of Christ the King Prep is Fr. Bob Sandoz. Its founding principal was Kevin P. Cuddihy, the former principal of St. Peter's Preparatory School in Jersey City and former dean of students at Xavier High School in Manhattan.

For the 2016–17 school year, the cost per student was $12,835, defrayed through a $7,100 corporate internship and $2,700 in financial assistance provided to all students; the net tuition was $2,700 per student.

Students had to complete 40 hours of voluntary service in each of the first two years and 50 hours of service in both junior and senior years. Various retreat opportunities were offered and all students made a retreat in junior year.

Student ambassadors were selected to represent the school to the public, and there was an elected student council.

On May 7, 2020, the archdiocese announced that "Cristo Rey Newark High School, a member of the Cristo Rey Network®, also will close due to lack of operational viability, as per a resolution adopted by the school’s Board."

== Athletics ==
The Christ the King Knights competed in the Super Essex Conference, following a reorganization of sports leagues in Northern New Jersey by the New Jersey State Interscholastic Athletic Association (NJSIAA).

Sports offered include:

Boys: Basketball, baseball (pending)

Girls: Volleyball, softball, cheerleading, and basketball

Co-Ed: Bowling, fencing, soccer, track & field, cross country, golf, and swimming
