= Mark Robertson =

Marcus or Mark Robertson may refer to:

== Sportsmen ==
- Marcus Robertson (born 1969), American football player and coach
- Mark Robertson (soccer) (born 1977), Australian central midfielder and centre back
- Mark Robertson (rugby union) (born 1984), Scottish wing and coach

== Others ==
- Marcus W. Robertson (1870–1948), American Medal of Honor recipient in 1899
- Mark Robertson (bassist), American bandmember and record producer since 1990s

== See also ==
- Mark Roberts (disambiguation)
- Mark Roberson (born 1967), English javelin thrower
- Marcus Roberson (born 1992), American football defensive back
