= Dukan (name) =

Dukan is a name. Notable people with the name include:

== Given name ==
- Đukan Đukanović (born 1992), Serbian basketball player
- Yun Dukan (born Yun Duk An; 1942), South Korean taekwondo practitioner

== Surname ==
- Duje Dukan (born 1991), Croatian-American basketball player
- Ivica Dukan (born 1956), Croatian basketball player
- M. Asli Dukan, American independent media producer, filmmaker and visual artist
- Pierre Dukan (born 1941), French nutritionist

== See also ==
- Dukan (disambiguation)
