= John Filak =

American football player (1903–1954)

Profile
- Positions: Tackle, guard

Personal information
- Born: October 13, 1903; New York, U.S.
- Died: September 29, 1954; Newark, New Jersey, U.S.
- Listed height: 6 ft 0 in (1.83 m)
- Listed weight: 190 lb (86 kg)

Career information
- High school: East Side (NJ)
- College: Penn State

Career history
- Frankford Yellow Jackets (1927–1929)

Career statistics
- Games: 39
- Stats at Pro Football Reference

John Filak (October 13, 1903 – September 29, 1954) was an American football player.

Filak played college football for Penn State from 1924 to 1926. Coach Hugo Bezdek rated Filak as the team's best tackle in 1925. He also played professional football in the National Football League (NFL) for the Frankford Yellow Jackets. He appeared in 39 NFL games, 18 as a starter, during the 1927, 1928, and 1929 seasons. He also reportedly played for the Green Bay Packers in 1941.

Filak also trained as a boxer under Leo Florian Hauck. After retiring from football, he owned and operated a confectionery store in Newark, New Jersey. He died in 1954 at age 49 a Beth Israel Hospital in Newark.
