= Hoddy Mahon =

American basketball coach (1932–2011)

Horace J. "Hoddy" Mahon (January 17, 1932 – November 25, 2011; pronounced "mah-HON") high school and collegiate basketball coach who was the head coach of the Seton Hall Pirates men's basketball team during the 1981–82 season. He succeeded Bill Raftery and preceded P. J. Carlesimo. He was a longtime assistant coach for the Pirates and was hired to replace Raftery, who left to pursue his communications career.

Born in Scranton, Pennsylvania, Mahon played prep basketball at Our Lady of Good Counsel High School in Newark, New Jersey, and then played for the Saint Peter's Peacocks men's basketball before joining the United States Army.

Preceding his tenure at Seton Hall, he won state titles as a New Jersey high school coach at Orange High School (winning the Group III state championship in 1968) and at Essex Catholic High School (winning the 1971 Parochial A North title). He won the Essex County and state championships while at Orange, earning honors as basketball coach of the year from The Star-Ledger. His 1968 team at Orange High School finished the season with a record of 27–0 after winning the Group III state title with a 64–56 win against Emerson High School in the championship game played in front of a crowd of nearly 7,000 at Convention Hall in Atlantic City.

Mahon's college coaching career began at Fordham University as an assistant to Hal Wissel, where he helped recruit players Ken Charles and Charlie Yelverton for the Rams.

A resident of Newark, New Jersey, he joined Raftery at Seton Hall as an assistant for 12 years, hoping to succeed him when the opportunity came. As head coach in 1981–82, he knocked off the University of Houston's Phi Slama Jama in an upset and started the season with a 9–1 record. Then, two starters and one bench player who played a large number of minutes were declared academically ineligible for the Pirates' second half of the season, with a slide leading to the team finishing the season with an 11–16 record. After the season, Seton Hall decided to hire P. J. Carlesimo instead of Mahon. He later took the reins at both William Paterson University and Upsala College, recording winning records at both schools.

He moved from Old Bridge Township, New Jersey, to Allenhurst, New Jersey, in the 1970s and died at his home there on November 25, 2011.
