= Harry L. Ettlinger =

German American art expert (1926–2018)

- Ettlinger in 2007
- Born: Heinz Ludwig Chaim Ettlinger; January 28, 1926; Karlsruhe, Germany
- Died: October 21, 2018 (aged 92); Livingston, New Jersey, U.S.
- Education: Newark College of Engineering (BS)
- Occupation: Engineer
- Honors: Congressional Gold Medal

Heinz Ludwig Chaim "Harry" Ettlinger (January 28, 1926 – October 21, 2018) was one of the Monuments Men. On October 22, 2015, Ettlinger and Richard Morton Barancik, a fellow Monuments Man, were awarded the Congressional Gold Medal. Ettlinger also worked closely with the Monuments Men Foundation for the Preservation of Art and its founder Robert M. Edsel to continue the mission of the MFAA and preserve their legacy.

== Biography ==
Ettlinger was born in Karlsruhe, Germany on January 28, 1926. He migrated from Germany with his parents and his two brothers in September 1938. When they arrived in the United States they first lived in Manhattan, eventually settling in Newark, New Jersey, where he graduated from East Side High School.

After leaving the service he attended Newark College of Engineering (now New Jersey Institute of Technology) on the G.I. Bill, graduating with a BS in mechanical engineering in 1950.

A resident of Rockaway Township, New Jersey, he died in 2018 at the age of 92.

== In popular culture ==
In the film The Monuments Men the character Sam Epstein is based on Ettlinger and played by Dimitri Leonidas.
