= Barringer High School =

High school in Essex County, New Jersey, US

Barringer Academy of the Arts & Humanities

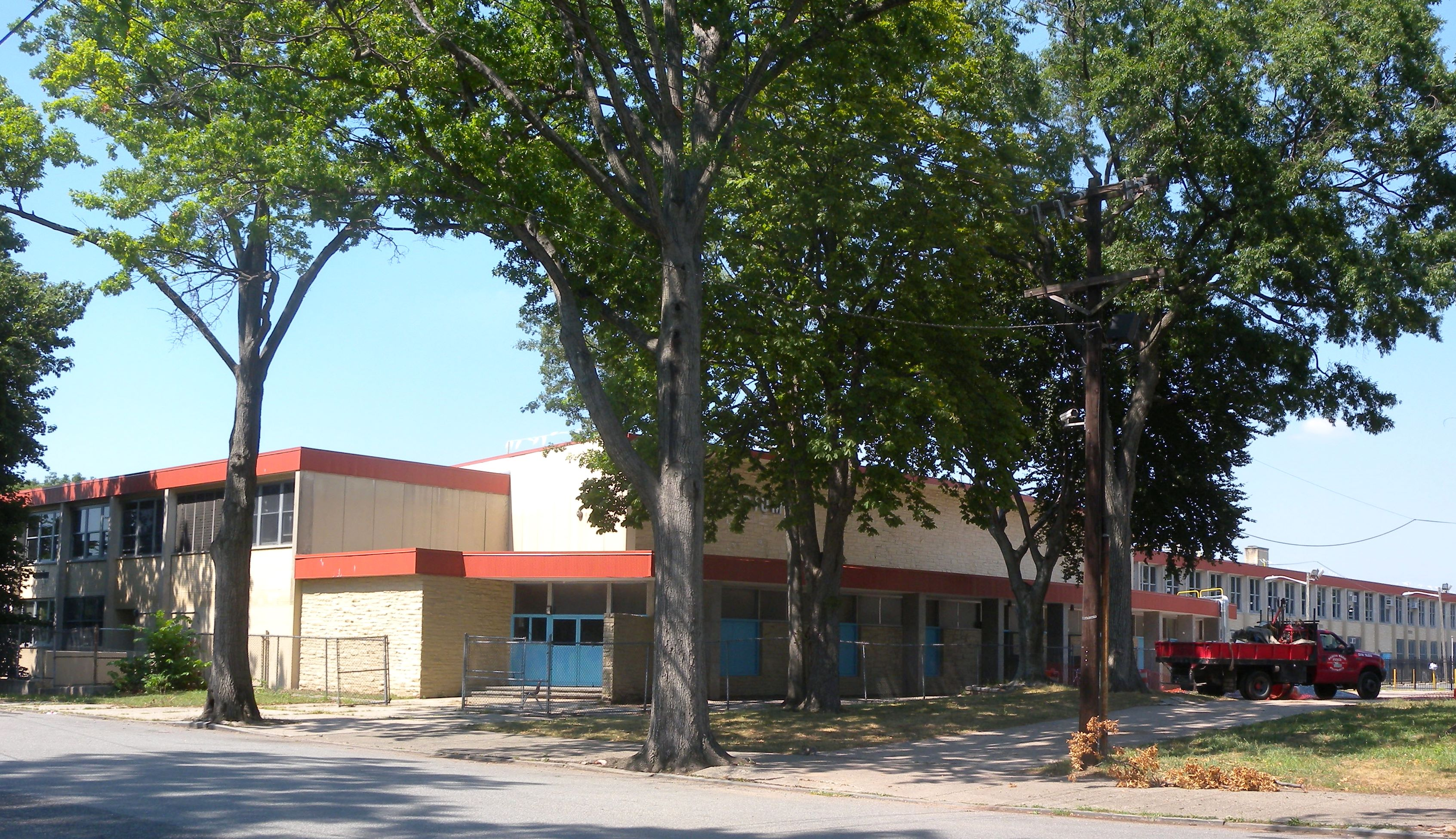
- Side of building

Location
- 90 Parker Street; Newark, Essex County, New Jersey 07104; United States; 40.756539°N 74.179286°W

Information
- Type: Public high school
- Established: 1838; 188 years ago
- School district: Newark Public Schools
- NCES School ID: 341134002190
- Principal: Natasha Pared
- Faculty: 110.0 FTEs
- Grades: 9-12
- Enrollment: 1,894 (as of 2024–25)
- Student to teacher ratio: 17.2:1
- Language: English
- Area: Urban
- Colors: Royal Blue and white
- Athletics conference: Super Essex Conference (general); North Jersey Super Football Conference (football)
- Team name: Blue Bears
- Rival: East Orange Campus High School
- Website: www.nps.k12.nj.us/barringer/

Barringer Academy of the Arts & Humanities (formerly Barringer High School and Newark High School), is a four-year comprehensive public high school serving students in ninth through twelfth grades in Newark, in Essex County, in the U.S. state of New Jersey, operating as part of the Newark Public Schools. Some consider it to be the third oldest public high school in the United States. The school is accredited by the Middle States Association of Colleges and Schools Commission on Elementary and Secondary Schools until July 2031 and has been accredited since 1981.

As of the 2024–25 school year, the school had an enrollment of 1,894 students and 110.0 classroom teachers (on an FTE basis), for a student–teacher ratio of 17.2:1. There were 1,048 students (55.3% of enrollment) eligible for free lunch and 82 (4.3% of students) eligible for reduced-cost lunch.

== Awards, recognition and rankings ==
The school was the 327th-ranked public high school in New Jersey out of 339 schools statewide in New Jersey Monthly magazine's September 2014 cover story on the state's "Top Public High Schools", using a new ranking methodology. The school had been ranked 313th in the state of 328 schools in 2012, after being ranked 311th in 2010 out of 322 schools listed. The magazine ranked the school 306th in 2008 out of 316 schools. The school was ranked 303rd in the magazine's September 2006 issue, which surveyed 316 schools across the state.

== History ==
In 1838, Nathan Hedges opened a high school in a building on Bank Street. On January 7, 1853, a three-story building was opened at the corner of Washington and Linden and had an enrollment of 498 boys and girls.

In 1875, William N. Barringer was hired to succeed George B. Sears as superintendent of schools. Barringer oversaw the construction of a second high school building at a cost of $300,000 (equivalent to $11.6 million in 2025), which is the site of the current faculty parking lot. Construction started in 1878 and was completed in 1899. In 1907, the Newark High School was renamed to honor Barringer.

== Athletics ==
The Barringer High School Blue Bears compete in the Super Essex Conference, which is comprised of public and private high schools in Essex County and was established following a reorganization of sports leagues in Northern New Jersey by the New Jersey State Interscholastic Athletic Association. With 1,115 students in grades 10–12, the school was classified by the NJSIAA for the 2019–20 school year as Group IV for most athletic competition purposes, which included schools with an enrollment of 1,060 to 5,049 students in that grade range. Until the NJSIAA's 2009 realignment, the school had participated in Division B of the Northern New Jersey Interscholastic League, which included high schools located in Bergen, Essex and Passaic counties, and was separated into three divisions based on NJSIAA size classification. The football team competes in the Liberty White division of the North Jersey Super Football Conference, which includes 112 schools competing in 20 divisions, making it the nation's biggest football-only high school sports league. The school was classified by the NJSIAA as Group V North for football for 2022–2024, which included schools with 1,317 to 5,409 students.

The school's football rivalry with East Orange Campus High School, which dates back to a Thanksgiving Day game played in 1897, was listed at 7th on NJ.com's 2017 list "Ranking the 31 fiercest rivalries in N.J. HS football". East Orange leads the rivalry with a 63-39-9 overall record as of 2023.

In 1918, during future major league baseball player Moe Berg's senior season, the Newark Star-Eagle selected a nine-man "dream team" from the city's best prep and public high school baseball players, and Berg was named the team's third baseman.

The boys track team won the indoor track public school state championship in 1930, 1934 and 1939.

The boys track team won the spring / outdoor track state championship in Group IV in 1933 and 1934.

The boys fencing team was the overall state co-champion in 1969 with Essex Catholic High School after both teams had overall records of 45–9 in competition; Barringer won the team foil competition.

The 1975 football team finished the season with a 9–1–1 record after winning the North II Group IV state sectional title with a 14–13 victory against Livingston High School in the championship game played in front of a crowd of 7,500.

The 1980 boys basketball team finished the season with a 26–4 record after winning the Group IV state championship, defeating Trenton Central High School by a score of 68–56 in the tournament final.

== Administration ==
The school's principal is Natasha Pared. Her core administrative team includes five vice principals.

== Notable alumni ==
=== Arts and literature ===
- Amiri Baraka (1934–2014), poet and playwright, who was New Jersey Poet Laureate
- Hilda Belcher (1881–1963), artist known for her paintings, watercolors and portraits
- Albert Boni (1892–1981), publisher
- Ron Carey (1935–2007), actor on film and television, known for his recurring role on Barney Miller
- Angelo Cifelli (born 1939) singer, composer and guitarist who performed and wrote songs for Frankie Valli and The Four Seasons
- Ted Fio Rito (1900–1971), singer and songwriter
- Jerome Kern (1885–1945), composer of musical theatre and popular music
- William J. Maguire (1916–1997), politician who served in the New Jersey General Assembly from 1976 to 1982
- Andrew E. Svenson (1910–1975), children's author, publisher and partner in the Stratemeyer Syndicate, who authored or coauthored more than 70 books for children, including books in the Hardy Boys and Bobbsey Twins series
- Grif Teller (1899–1993), artist best known for his paintings for the Pennsylvania Railroad

=== Sports ===
- Moe Berg (1902–1972), Major League Baseball player and spy for the CIA, who was called "the brainiest guy in baseball"
- Howard Cann (1895–1992), sportsman best known as the head coach of the NYU Violets men's basketball team
- Robinson Canó (born 1982), baseball player, attended for one year
- Norm Granger (born 1961, class of 1980), former fullback in the National Football League, who played for the Dallas Cowboys and the Atlanta Falcons
- Rupert Mills (1892–1929), professional baseball player who played part of one season for the 1915 Newark Peppers of the Federal League
- Lou Palmer (1935–2019), sportscaster who was a SportsCenter anchor and reporter, and was one of the original studio anchors at WFAN, the nation's first all-sports radio station
- Pete Shaw (born 1954, class of 1972), safety who played in the NFL for the San Diego Chargers and New York Giants
- Andre Tippett (born 1959), Hall of Fame former linebacker with the New England Patriots

=== Government ===
- J. LeRoy Baxter (1881 - ?), dentist / oral surgeon and politician, who was elected to represent Essex County, New Jersey, in the New Jersey General Assembly in 1928
- William J. Brennan (1906–1997), Associate Justice of the United States Supreme Court
- Ralph R. Caputo (born 1940, class of 1958), politician who has represented the 28th Legislative District in the New Jersey General Assembly since 2008
- Robert L. Carter (1917–2012), civil rights leader and United States District Judge
- Anthony Giuliano (1898–1970), politician who served in the New Jersey General Assembly
- Michael Giuliano (1915–1976), politician who served two terms in the New Jersey Senate
- Anthony Imperiale (1931–1999), paramedic, activist, vigilante, militant leader and populist politician who served on the Municipal Council of Newark and represented the city in the New Jersey General Assembly and New Jersey Senate
- Donald M. Payne (1934–2012, class of 1952), member, United States House of Representatives from New Jersey's 10th congressional district
- Luis A. Quintana (born 1960), politician who served as Mayor of Newark from November 2013 to July 2014
- Peter W. Rodino (1909–2005), member of the United States House of Representatives from New Jersey's 10th congressional district
- C. Robert Sarcone (1925–2020), politician who served in both houses of the New Jersey Legislature
- Norman Schwarzkopf Sr., (1895–1958), first superintendent of the New Jersey State Police and father of General "Stormin' Norman" Norman Schwarzkopf Jr.
- Irvine I. Turner (1913–1974), politician who was the first Black official in Newark, New Jersey, elected to the Municipal Council when he took office in 1954
- Arthur T. Vanderbilt (1888–1957), judge and judicial reformer who served as Chief Justice of the New Jersey Supreme Court from 1948 to 1957
- Anthony M. Villane (1929–2022), dentist and politician who was elected to serve seven terms in the New Jersey General Assembly from 1976 to 1988
- John Beam Vreeland (1852–1923), attorney and politician who served in the New Jersey Senate and as the United States Attorney for the district of New Jersey
- George M. Wallhauser (1900–1993, class of 1918), politician who served in the United States House of Representatives from New Jersey's 12th congressional district

=== Other ===
- Steve Adubato Sr. (1932–2020; class of 1949), founder of Robert Treat Academy Charter School
- MacDella Cooper (born 1977), Liberian philanthropist and founder of the MacDella Cooper Foundation
- August Meier (1923–2003), professor of history at Kent State University and a scholar on African American history
- Arthur A. Schmon (1895–1964), business executive who became a leading figure in the paper industry of Ontario and Quebec
- Marion Thompson Wright (1902–1962), scholar and activist who, in 1940, became the first African-American woman in the United States to earn her Ph.D. in history
