= West Side High School (New Jersey) =

High school in Newark, New Jersey, United States

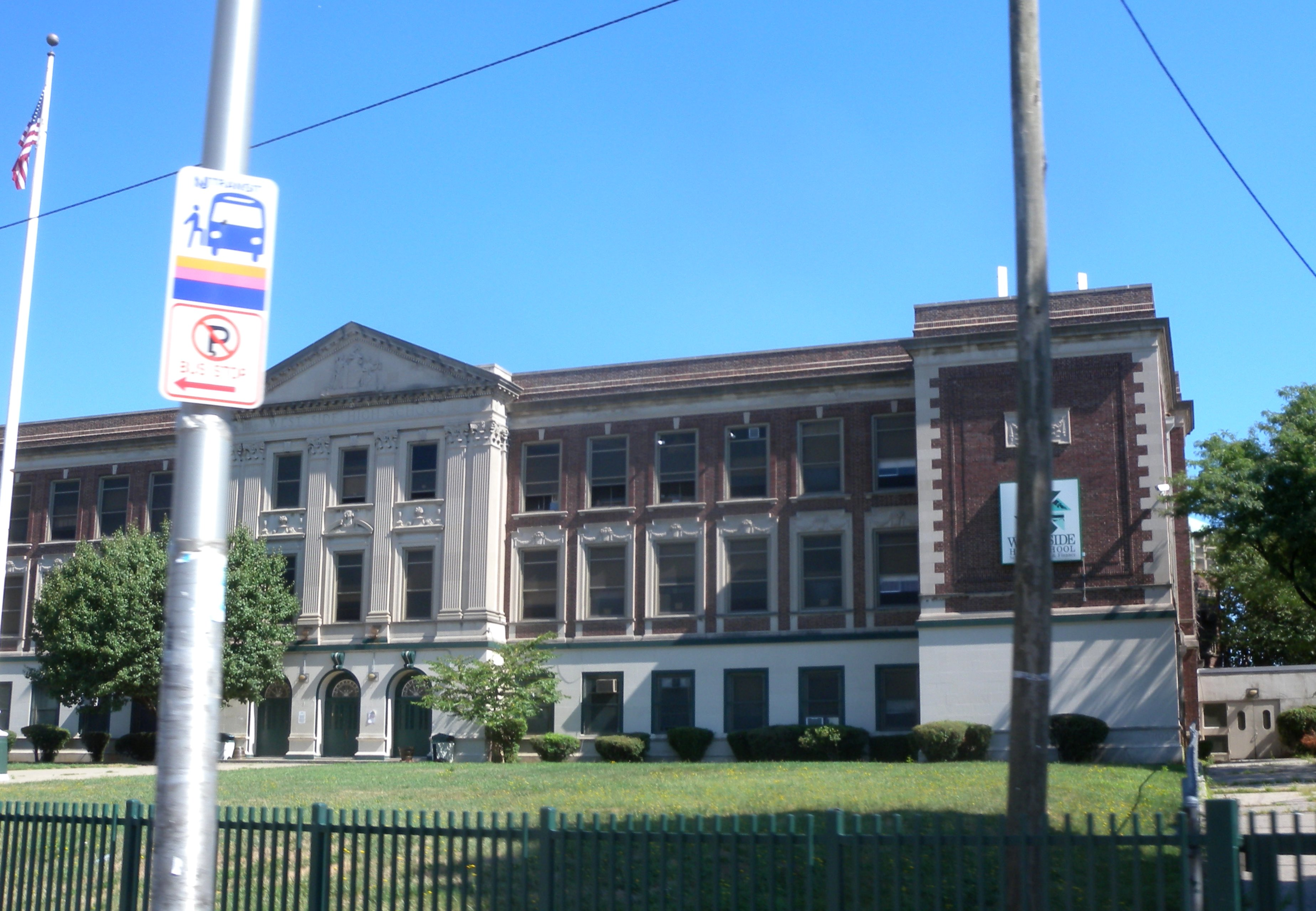

Location
- 403 South Orange Avenue; Newark, Essex County, New Jersey 07103; United States
- 40.741149°N 74.20292°W

Information
- Type: public high school
- Established: 1925
- School district: Newark Public Schools
- NCES School ID: 341134002208
- Principal: Akbar Cook
- Faculty: 43.5 FTEs
- Grades: 9-12
- Enrollment: 621 (as of 2023–24)
- Student to teacher ratio: 14.3:1
- Colors: Green and white
- Athletics conference: Super Essex Conference (general); North Jersey Super Football Conference (football)
- Team name: Roughriders
- Accreditation: Middle States Association of Colleges and Schools Commission on Elementary and Secondary Schools
- Website: www.nps.k12.nj.us/wsd/

West Side High School is a four-year comprehensive community public high school complex in Newark, in Essex County, in the U.S. state of New Jersey, operating as part of the Newark Public Schools. The school is operated by the Newark Public Schools and is located at 279 Chancellor Avenue. The school is accredited until July 2031 and has been accredited by the Middle States Association of Colleges and Schools Commission on Elementary and Secondary Schools since April 2024.

As of the 2023–24 school year, the school had an enrollment of 621 students and 43.5 classroom teachers (on an FTE basis), for a student–teacher ratio of 14.3:1. There were 425 students (68.4% of enrollment) eligible for free lunch and 58 (9.3% of students) eligible for reduced-cost lunch.

== History ==
West Side High School opened on September 14, 1925, in a building designed to provide students with classrooms, an auditorium, gyms, and other facilities, serving 520 boys and 809 girls.

The school had been accredited by the Middle States Association of Colleges and Schools Commissions on Elementary and Secondary Schools until 2011, when the school's accreditation status was removed.

From 2014 to 2018, the West Side campus hosted two separate high school programs that operated independently but shared a facility and athletic programs:

- Newark Early College High School, which prepares students in grades 7–12 to complete up to 60 college-level credits during their high school career
- Newark Vocational High School prepares students in grades 9-12 for college and career options.

== Awards, recognition and rankings ==
The school was the 326th-ranked public high school in New Jersey out of 339 schools statewide in New Jersey Monthly magazine's September 2014 cover story on the state's "Top Public High Schools", using a new ranking methodology. The school had been ranked 268th in the state of 328 schools in 2012, after being ranked 319th in 2010 out of 322 schools listed. The magazine ranked the school 313th in 2008 out of 316 schools. The school was ranked 313th in the magazine's September 2006 issue, which surveyed 316 schools across the state.

West Side High School has received national attention for its community-based educational approach and commitment to student support. In recognition of these efforts, the Ellen DeGeneres Show awarded the school two $50,000 grants through the "One Million Acts of Good" campaign, highlighting Principal Akbar Cook's work to address the needs of students beyond academics.

In May 2019, Oprah Winfrey made a surprise visit to the school and announced a $500,000 gift to support the Lights On initiative, a program designed to provide students with a safe and supportive environment during evenings and weekends.

== Athletics ==
The West Side High School Roughriders compete in the Super Essex Conference, which is comprised of public and private high schools in Essex County and was established following a reorganization of sports leagues in Northern New Jersey by the New Jersey State Interscholastic Athletic Association (NJSIAA). Prior to the 2009 realignment, the team had been in the Skyline Division of the Northern Hills Conference, which included schools in Essex, Morris and Passaic counties. With 728 students in grades 10–12, the school was classified by the NJSIAA for the 2019–20 school year as Group II for most athletic competition purposes, which included schools with an enrollment of 486 to 758 students in that grade range. The football team competes in the Freedom White division of the North Jersey Super Football Conference, which includes 112 schools competing in 20 divisions, making it the nation's biggest football-only high school sports league. The school was classified by the NJSIAA as Group III North for football for 2024–2026, which included schools with 700 to 884 students.

The boys' cross country team won the Group IV state championship in 1949, 1950 (as co-champion with Asbury Park High School), 1951, 1953 and 1954.

The boys' track team won the Group III indoor relay state championship in 1988

The boys track team won the Group II spring / outdoor track state championship in 1988 and the Group IV title in 1989.

The 1993 girls' basketball team won the Group III state championship with a 60–50 defeat in the tournament final of Egg Harbor Township High School, the state's top-ranked team and the group's defending champion. Entering the Tournament of Champions as the fourth-seeded team, West Side defeated number five seed Haddonfield Memorial High School by a score of 44–39 in the quarterfinals and top-seeded St. Rose High School by 48–38 in the semis before falling to second-seed St. John Vianney High School in the finals by a score of 57–43 to finish the season with a 30–4 record.

The football team won the 2007 North II Group III state sectional championship with a 20–0 win against South Plainfield High School in a game played at Giants Stadium, earning the team its first ever sectional title. Since 2009, the football team plays their home games at Untermann Field, which is shared with other public schools in Newark, following the closure and demolition of Newark Schools Stadium, which was constructed in 1925 and closed in 2006.

The boys basketball team won the Group II state championship in 2016 and 2017, defeating Camden High School in the tournament final both years. Down by 17 points at halftime, the 2016 team scored two foul shots with less than two seconds remaining in the game to defeat Camden 85–53 in the Group II championship game. The team won its second consecutive Group II title with a 51–49 win in the championship game. The team advanced to the Tournament of Champions both seasons, coming into the 2016 ToC seeded fourth and falling 71–62 to fifth-seeded Teaneck High School in the quarterfinals; the 2017 team was the fifth seed, again falling in the quarterfinals to Teaneck, this time in overtime by a score of 70–62 to finish the season with a record of 25–7.

== Administration ==
The school's principal is Akbar Cook. The core administration team includes two vice principals.

== Notable alumni ==
- Alma Adams (born 1946; class of 1964), educator and longtime North Carolina state legislator
- Hugh Joseph Addonizio (1914–1981), politician who served for 13 years as a U.S. Congressman before serving as Mayor of Newark from 1962 to 1970
- Dino Boyd (born 1996), offensive lineman for the Ottawa Redblacks of the Canadian Football League
- Ray Chambers (born 1942), philanthropist and humanitarian
- Sandra Bolden Cunningham (born 1950), member of the New Jersey Senate since 2007, where she represents the 31st Legislative District
- Jerry Gant (1961–2018), visual artist, poet, performance artist and educator
- Bernard Gersten (1923–2020), theatrical producer
- Frederick Bernard Lacey (1920–2017) United States district judge of the United States District Court for the District of New Jersey
- Rocco Neri (1919–2011), politician who represented the 28th Legislative District in the New Jersey General Assembly from 1974 to 1976
- J'Vonne Parker (born 1982), former American football defensive tackle
- Aulcie Perry (born 1950), professional basketball player
- Charlie Persip (1929–2020), jazz drummer
- Redman (born 1970 as Reginald Noble), rapper, DJ, record producer and actor
- Richie Regan (1930–2002), basketball player and coach who played in the NBA for the Rochester / Cincinnati Royals
- Rod Steiger (1925–2002), actor dropped out at age 16 after joining the United States Navy
- Dave Toma (born 1933), former Newark Police Department police detective whose undercover work and battles with his superiors became the basis of the television series Toma, which ran on the ABC network from 1973 to 1974
- Art Weiner (1926–2013), end who played in the National Football League for the New York Yanks
- Renauld White (1944–2024), actor and model, who appeared in the soap opera television series Guiding Light
- Tahir Whitehead (born 1989; class of 2008), professional football linebacker who has played in the NFL for the Oakland Raiders
- Barrence Whitfield (born 1955), soul and R&B vocalist, best known as the frontman for Barrence Whitfield & the Savages
- Kevin Widemond (1985–2009) basketball player who played for the Portuguese basketball club Ovarense
