= Our Lady of Good Counsel High School (New Jersey) =

Defunct Catholic high school in Newark, New Jersey, United States

Location
- 239 Woodside Avenue; Newark, (Essex County), New Jersey 07104; United States
- 40.7746°N 74.1646°W

Information
- Type: Private, Coeducational Catholic school
- Religious affiliation: Roman Catholic
- Established: 1925
- Status: Closed
- Closed: 2006
- School district: Archdiocese of Newark
- Grades: 9–12

Our Lady of Good Counsel High School was a private, Roman Catholic high school in Newark, in Essex County, in the U.S. state of New Jersey.

Opened as a four-year high school in September 1925, the school closed in June 2006 due to declining enrollment and increasing financial deficits. A new school, Christ the King Preparatory School, opened on the site in September 2007. Christ the King, later known as Christo Rey Newark High School, closed in 2020.

== Athletics ==
The basketball team won the Non-Public Group A state championship in 1934 (defeating St. Mary High School of Rutherford in the tournament final) and 1940 (vs. Camden Catholic High School). Down by 10 points in the middle of the fourth quarter, the 1940 team mounted a furious comeback to win the Group II private schools title (since reclassified as Non-Public A) with a 41–39 win against Camden Catholic in the championship game played at the Elizabeth Armory.

The boys track team won the Non-Public Group A spring / outdoor track state championship in 1935–1940. The streak of six consecutive titles is tied for fourth longest.

The boys track team won the indoor / winter track Non-Public Group I/II state championship in 1940.

The boys cross country running team won the Non-Public Group A state championship in 1951.

== Notable alumni ==
- Michael F. Adubato (1934-1993), politician who served nine consecutive terms, a total of 18 years, in the New Jersey General Assembly from 1974 to 1992, representing the 28th Legislative District for four terms and the 30th Legislative District for an additional five terms
- Andy Chisick (1916-1986), American football center who played in the NFL for the Chicago Cardinals
- Bill Field (1926–2022), politician who served two terms in the New Hampshire House of Representatives
- Hoddy Mahon (1932–2011), college and high school basketball coach who was head coach of the Seton Hall Pirates during the 1981–82 season
- Teresa Ruiz (born 1974), politician who has represented the 29th Legislative District in the New Jersey Senate since taking office in 2008
