= Dr. Jabez Campfield House =

Historic house in New Jersey, United States

- U.S. National Register of Historic Places
- New Jersey Register of Historic Places
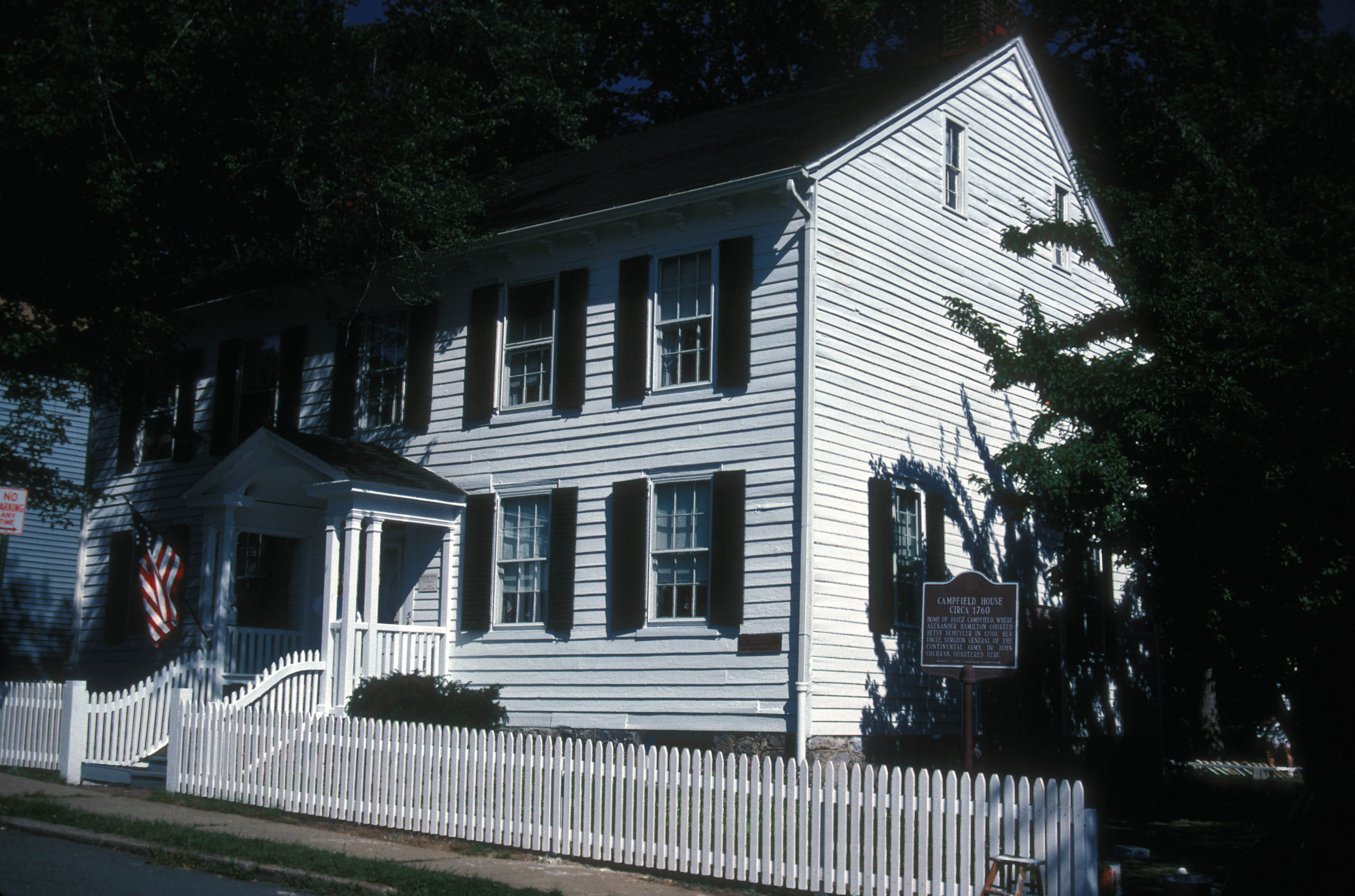
- Campfield House; Schuyler-Hamilton House

- Location within Morris County, New Jersey Location within New Jersey Location within the United States
- Location: 5 Olyphant Place; Morristown, New Jersey
- Coordinates: 40°47′54″N 74°28′22″W
- Area: less than one acre
- Built: 1765
- Architectural style: Colonial Revival
- NRHP reference No.: 08000837
- NJRHP No.: 3985

Significant dates
- Added to NRHP: September 4, 2008
- Designated NJRHP: March 25, 2008

The Dr. Jabez Campfield House, also known as the Schuyler Hamilton House, is a historic, two-story, braced timber-frame colonial Georgian-style house and museum located at 5 Olyphant Place, Morristown, New Jersey.

It is listed on the National Register of Historic Places and owned by the Morristown Chapter, Daughters of the American Revolution (DAR).

== History ==
The house was built c. 1760 along King's Highway (now Morris Street) on the eastern edge of what was then the small village of Morristown. In 1765, Dr. Jabez Campfield, a young doctor from Newark, bought the house when he moved to Morristown with his new wife, Sarah Ward, to establish his medical practice. The Campfields lived in the house for 56 years. Their only son, William, was born in the house in 1766 and inherited the property upon Dr. Campfield's death in 1821.

In addition to serving as the doctor in Morristown, Dr. Campfield served as a surgeon in the Continental Army during the American Revolutionary War.

During the winter encampment of the Continental Army in Morristown in 1777, smallpox swept through the army and the town. As part of the army's medical team, Dr. Campfield served an important role inoculating soldiers against the disease, using his house as his base of operations.

When the army returned to Morristown for the winter encampment in 1779–1780, Surgeon General of the Continental Army, Dr. John Cochran, was billeted to stay in Dr. Campfield's home. The home was used as a "flying hospital" (mobile hospital for the army) and a storehouse for medical supplies.

That winter, Founding Father Alexander Hamilton courted his future wife, Elizabeth Schuyler in Dr. Campfield's house. Hamilton served as aide de camp to George Washington and was based with Washington at the nearby home of Theodosia Ford. Cochran's wife Gertrude joined him, and by January their niece Elizabeth Schuyler joined them. In a short time, Hamilton and Elizabeth Schuyler met and became engaged. A traditional story is that Dr. Cochran, tired and chilled after a long day in the field, was unable to stretch out on his favorite sofa because it was frequently occupied by the young couple. The union with Elizabeth Schuyler brought Alexander Hamilton into familiar contact with the most powerful families of the day, helping to secure Hamilton's place in society.

After the war, Dr. Campfield trained many doctors in the area and was very active in civic pursuits.

When Dr. Campfield died in 1821, his son William inherited the home and lived there until he died only three years later in 1824. William left the property to his six children, but none of them remained in Morristown. The house was advertised for rent for several years, and it remained in the Campfield family until 1831, when the locally influential Tuttle family bought it. The Tuttles owned the house for the next sixty years.

Local builder James Clark and investor Robert Dalglish purchased the property in 1891, and soon after Dalglish transferred his interest to Clark. In 1895, Clark moved the house about 100 feet to the rear of the property, most likely to the site of the garden, and rotated it to face westward along Olyphant Place. For a few years, Clark rented the house as a two-family dwelling.

Mr. Clark's widow, Millie, sold the house to the Morristown Chapter, Daughters of the American Revolution in 1923. The Chapter restored the house to reflect the period of its greatest significance, its association with the American Revolution, and named it the Schuyler-Hamilton House to remember the courtship of Alexander Hamilton and Elizabeth Schuyler.

Since 1924, the Chapter has used the house as its headquarters and opens it to the public for tours. The house contains furnishings and artifacts of the period, as well as items owned by Campfield and the Hamiltons. The house's "keeping room" exhibit features medical implements used during the 18th century and describes medical practices of that period. In 2020, a part of the garden was renovated and replanted with purple, yellow, and white flowers to celebrate the hundredth anniversary of the women's suffrage movement.

Docent-led tours are held regularly by DAR volunteers.

== See also ==
- National Register of Historic Places listings in Morris County, New Jersey
