= Kevin Widemond =

American basketball player

Personal information
- Born: November 24, 1985 Newark, New Jersey, U.S.
- Died: October 25, 2009 (aged 23) Leiria, Portugal
- Listed height: 6 ft 1 in (1.85 m)
- Listed weight: 175 lb (79 kg)

Career information
- High school: West Side (Newark, New Jersey)
- College: San Jacinto (2004–2006); East Texas A&M (2006–2008)
- NBA draft: 2008: undrafted
- Playing career: 2008–2009
- Position: Point guard

Career history
- 2009: Ovarense

Kevin Widemond (December 24, 1985 – October 25, 2009) was an American basketball player. After starring at East Texas A&M University he went on to play professionally in Portugal where he collapsed and later died after suffering a heart attack during a game.

== Early life ==
Widemond was born in Newark, New Jersey, to Kevin Thomas and Roslyn Widemond. He played in high school basketball for West Side High School.

== College career ==
Widemond was a two-year starter for San Jacinto College and then played at Texas A&M University–Commerce in Commerce, Texas, where he majored in Business Administration. During the 2006–07 season with the university's Lion team, he led his team with 84 three pointers and was second on the team in scoring with 14.1 ppg playing in all 28 games, and earning a start in 24 games. He scored in double digits in 20 of his 28 games, including a career-high 27 against Eastern New Mexico on December 9, 2006). As a senior, in 2007–08, Widemond led the Lions to the championship game of the Lone Star Conference Tournament and earned All-Tournament team honors.

== Professional career and death ==
After graduation, Widemond signed for the Portuguese basketball club Ovarense of the Portuguese Basketball Premier League in the 2009–2010 season. A month into the season he died of a heart attack during a game. The Portuguese Basketball Federation said he collapsed in the locker room during halftime of a game between his team Ovarense and Academica in Leiria, in northern Portugal for third-place playoff game of the António Pratas Trophy. He died in the hospital when efforts of resuscitation failed. Widemond was the fourth basketball player to die in Portugal, the others being Angel Almeyda (Spain), Rui Guimarães (Angola) and Paulo Pinto (Portugal). His death started a movement to push for instillations of defibrillators in schools, sports venues and other public places in Portugal.
