= Jabez Campfield =

Jabez Campfield (24 December 1737 – 20 May 1821) was a colonial-era medical doctor, one of the earliest (perhaps the first) to set up practice in Morristown, New Jersey. He served as a surgeon in the Continental Army during the American Revolutionary War. During the Continental Army's winter encampment in Morristown in 1777, Dr. Campfield helped inoculate soldiers against a smallpox outbreak that spread through the army and the area that winter. Campfield was a surgeon on the Sullivan Expedition in upstate New York in the summer and autumn of 1779, during which he kept a detailed diary which has been preserved and published. During the winter encampment of 1779-1780, surgeon general John Cochran stayed in Campfield's home, and his home served as a "flying hospital" (temporary military hospital). Cochran's niece, Elizabeth Schuyler, came to stay in Dr. Campfield's home, and while there fell in love and became engaged to Founding Father Alexander Hamilton.

Following the war, Campfield became a prominent community leader, serving as the first Morris County Surrogate, founding the first lending library in Morristown as well as the Morris Academy, and serving as a Justice of the Peace, among many of his civic pursuits.

Campfield died in Morristown on 20 May 1821 and is buried in the cemetery of the Presbyterian Church of Morristown.

== Early life and education ==
Jabez Campfield was born in Newark, New Jersey, on 24 December 1737 to Benjamin Camfield (ca. 1710–1738) and his wife, Mehitabel Foster (? – April 1777). He was sent to grammar school at Providence Plantations, Rhode Island. In May 1755 he enrolled at the College of New Jersey (now Princeton University). He was among the first to study at the college's new building, Nassau Hall, when it moved to Princeton, New Jersey, in 1756. He received a bachelor of arts degree in 1759 and went on to receive a masters of arts degree in 1762. He returned to Newark to study medicine as an apprentice under Dr. William Burnet, an influential medical and civic leader who founded the Medical Society of New Jersey. Campfield joined the society as an incorporator in 1773.

Campfield married Sarah Ward in Newark in April 1765, and moved to Morristown, where he set up his medical practice. The couple bought a home on the outskirts of town, which is now owned and managed by the Morristown Chapter of the Daughters of the American Revolution. It is listed on the National Register of Historic Places as the Dr. Jabez Campfield House, and it is known locally as the Schuyler Hamilton House.

The Campfields had one son, William, who was born on 12 February 1766 and died on 16 July 1824.

== Military career ==
On 1 January 1777, Campfield joined the Continental Army as a surgeon appointed to Spencer's Additional Continental Regiment of the Continental Army.

Following the Continental Army's extended campaign and victories at Trenton and Princeton in December 1776 and early January 1777, the army marched to Morristown for its winter encampment, arriving on 6 January 1777. Upon their arrival, the army suffered a smallpox outbreak. Campfield provided medical support to help suppress the outbreak and assisted in implementing an inoculation program ordered by General George Washington. He participated in the Battles of Short Hills in June 1777, Brandywine in September 1777, and Germantown in October 1777. He is listed on the muster rolls during several months of the Valley Forge encampment during the winter of 1777-1778 and was in command during his assignment.

In 1779, General George Washington organized an expedition into western New York and western Pennsylvania to respond to attacks by Iroquois warriors and their allied Tory rangers. Campfield joined this expedition as a surgeon attached to the regiment, keeping a detailed diary of his experiences and observations of the natural environment, Native American life, and the hardships of wilderness travel with the army. Watching the burning of one Native American village after another, Campfield recognized and was bothered by the apparent genocide, though oddly he blamed it on the victims. On 11 August 1779 he wrote, "I very heartily wish these rusticks may be reduced to reason, by the approach of this army, without their suffering the extremes of war; there is something so cruel, in destroying the habitations of any people (however mean they may be, being their all) that I might say the prospect hurts my feelings." Almost one hundred years later, his diary was saved from the trash by a local historian Edmund D. Halsey, who then donated it to the New Jersey Historical Society in 1873 and arranged for it to be published in the proceedings of the society the same year.

Only a few weeks after Campfield returned home, in December 1779 Washington and the Continental Army returned to Morristown for a second winter encampment. This time, Surgeon General of the Continental Army John Cochran was billeted to stay in Campfield's house. Dr. Campfield knew Cochran through the Medical Society of New Jersey, where Cochran had served as its second president. His house was used as a storehouse and "flying hospital" (temporary military hospital) for the army that winter. In June 1780, Dr. Campfield served in the Battle of Springfield.

Spencer's Regiment was dissolved on 1 January 1781, and after a few months break, Campfield rejoined the army as a surgeon to the 2nd Continental Light Dragoons, serving under his old teacher William Burnet. He continued to serve in this unit until the end of the war, and mustered out of the army at Danbury, Connecticut on 15 June 1783, returned to Morristown, and resumed his medical practice.

== Later life and career ==
Campfield continued his medical practice for some time after the war. Following the tradition of apprenticeship training that he received, he trained many young doctors, including his own son William, John Darcy of Mendham, Jabez Gwinnup, Abraham Canfield, and Ebenezer H. Pierson. But over time his medical activities waned, and he finally turned over his practice to his son William in 1792. He remained an active member of the Medical Society of New Jersey. The society faced declining membership and low attendance in the late 1790s and early 1800s, and in 1807, he served on a committee to confer with a splinter group and reunite to help save the society. The society continues to exist today as the first professional society in the United States, due in part to Dr. Campfield's efforts to save it.

As the years passed, he devoted himself more and more to civic activities, for which his interests ranged widely. He served as Surrogate for Morris County from 1785 to 1803, Justice of the Peace in 1793 and 1798, and both Judge of Elections and Town Committee member in 1800. In 1790, he was appointed to a committee to raise funds and oversee the building of a new church building for his congregation, known then as the First Presbyterian Church (now the Presbyterian Church of Morristown). In 1787 he was an original member of the Society of the Cincinnati in New Jersey, a fraternal organization of former officers of the Continental army. In 1791 he was one of the founders and first president of the Morris Academy, built on property deeded to the school by the First Presbyterian Church. Deeply interested in gardening and farming, Dr. Campfield founded the Morris County Society for the Promotion of Agriculture and Domestic Manufactures, which later became the Morristown Library. He donated many of his books on botany and gardening to the library, and became its librarian in 1812. He received an honorary Doctor of Medicine degree from Queens College (now Rutgers University) in 1792.

Campfield applied for a pension under the 1818 Pension Act, which offered pensions for indigent veterans. In his application, he declared that “bodily infirmities occasioned him to lay aside the practice of Physic as many as twenty years ago, and from losing its revenues and from misfortunes neither feigned nor necessary to relate, this Deponent, who is in the eighty first year of his age, is now in reduced circumstances, and desires and needs assistance from his country for support.” His pension was granted in August 1818. But in 1820, Congress passed a law that purged all the pension rolls completely, and all former recipients had to prove their eligibility all over again. After receiving only four biannual pension payments, he was purged from the pension roll, and did not receive a pension for the rest of his life

Campfield died in Morristown on 20 May 1821, and was buried in the church yard of the Presbyterian Church of Morristown.
