= Lou Palmer (sportscaster) =

American sportscaster (1935–2019)

- Born: Louis John Puma; November 5, 1935; Newark, New Jersey, U.S.
- Died: October 18, 2019 (aged 83); Wellington, Florida, U.S.
- Occupation: Sportscaster

Louis John Puma (November 5, 1935 – October 18, 2019), known professionally as Lou Palmer, was an American sportscaster.

Palmer was an employee at ESPN from 1978 (one year before the network launched on cable television) to 1985. He covered many top sports events and was a SportsCenter anchor and reporter. He was also one of the original studio anchors at WFAN, New York City, the nation's first All Sports Radio Station. Lou lived in Wellington, Florida, a suburb of West Palm Beach, where he ran an Adult Amateur Baseball League (founded 1992). He was a public address announcer for Florida State League games in Jupiter, Florida, and Port St. Lucie, Florida, and worked in several baseball tournaments for NABA (National Adult Baseball Association). He was also the official scorer in spring training games for the St. Louis Cardinals beginning in 1998.

Born and raised in Newark, New Jersey, Palmer attended Barringer High School and played college baseball at Seton Hall University, South Orange, New Jersey and professionally in the farm systems of the New York Giants and Chicago White Sox.

Palmer died on October 18, 2019, at the age of 83.
