= Jerry Gant =

American visual artist

Jerry Gant (November 21, 1961 – November 11, 2018) was a multi-disciplinary American visual and performance artist, poet, griot, fashion designer, arts educator, activist, and historian. His work was an integral part of the visual culture of his hometown, Newark, New Jersey, where he worked on murals in every ward and created public sculpture commissions, including 13 surrounding Nat Turner Park and a five-piece installation at Newark Penn Station. He was a prolific grafitti artist, creating portraits and murals in an array of sizes scaling between intimate to larger than life. His work also included wearable textile art and paintings, with mediums including wood, wire, paper, textile, and organic material. His fashion design included hand-painted symbols influenced by the Black diaspora on found garments and other material. At his passing in 2018, he was survived by his three children and four grandchildren.

Newark mayor Ras Baraka spoke of Gant after his death saying, "If you don't know Jerry Gant, you don't know our city." Memorials for Gant were held at Newark Symphony Hall (November 19, 2018) and the Newark Museum of Art.

== Early life and education ==
Gant was born in Newark, New Jersey where he moved between apartments with his mother. When he was young, his father passed away from cirrhosis. According to Gant, "It was poverty beating him into submission. He didn't die; he was killed."

Gant attended West Side High School and studied graphic design at Essex County College. He took courses at the Newark School of Fine and Industrial Arts, where, in 1981, he studied under sculptor, painter, and muralist, Kevin Sampson. He took an air-brushing class by Sampson and the two began a friendship. At the time, Sampson was also a police officer. He noted their friendship growing from their mutual bluntness, despite at first being wary of one another. Gant also studied at the New Jersey Institute of Technology (NJIT).

== Career ==
Gant was active in the 1980s graffiti Street Art scene in New York City. In the early 1990s, influenced by African-American artists including filmmaker Spike Lee, Gant began performing spoken word at New York City open-mic events and at Café Genesis in Newark. Gant worked in textile and clothing design, metal sculpture, woodcarving, and wall murals. Gant sought to reflect the spirit and community of Newark, while challenging stereotypes and conventional thinking. He worked on art projects inside and often outside the "white-cube" in an effort to expand the role art can play in urban spaces.

If Newark were to look for an artist that most represents it, it would be Jerry Gant ... No artist in this city has had a more visible presence or impact on the people of Newark.

— Kevin Blythe Sampson

Art critic Benjamin Genocchio of The New York Times described Gant's sculptures that use found wood, metal and wire in his series of "ghetto blasters" as referencing "urbanity and the raw, explosive energy of music."

Gant's murals can be seen in New York City, Boston, London, and Newark.

Gant was a part of the Alternate Routes Hip Hop Festival (formerly Planet Hip Hop) at the New Jersey Performing Arts Center (NJPAC). He has held residencies at schools in Newark, Princeton, and New York University. He taught a masterclass on "Gantalism" at the NJPAC their Fall 2018 Hip Hop Intensive.

== Selected exhibitions ==
2021 Bulletproof Ambition: The Art of Jerry Gant, Paul Robeson Galleries, Rutgers University - Newark

- 2015 - I Might Be Next: Jerry Gant & Bryant Lebron, Paul Robeson Galleries, Rutgers University, Newark, NJ
- 2007 - My Brother's Thread, Cork Gallery, NY
- 2006 - ... but I was cool, Aljira, a Center for Contemporary Art, Newark, NJ
- 2005 - William Turner Sculpture Garden, Maplewood, NJ
- 2005 - Top Dog Underdog, Luna Stage Artist Space, Montclair, NJ

== Honors ==
- 2006 - Artist in Residence Program, Gallery Aferro
- 2006 - Artstart Grant, Newark Arts Council
- 2005 - Creative Heartwork Residency Awardship
- 2010- Newark Museum Film Festival, Paul Robeson Award, Honorable mention Short Documentary; "BulletProof Ambition"
