= Bill Field (American politician) =

American politician

Member of the New Hampshire House of Representatives from the Merrimack 36th district
- In office 2002–2004

Member of the New Hampshire House of Representatives from the Merrimack 7th district
- In office 2004–2006

Personal details
- Born: William Doty Field; September 10, 1926 Newark, New Jersey, U.S.
- Died: June 13, 2022 (aged 95) Pembroke, New Hampshire, U.S.
- Party: Republican
- Education: Seton Hall University

William Doty Field (September 10, 1926 – June 13, 2022) was an American politician. A member of the Republican Party, he served in the New Hampshire House of Representatives from 2002 to 2006.

== Life and career ==
Field was born in Newark, New Jersey, the son of Fredrick Field and Madeline Doty. He attended and graduated from Our Lady of Good Counsel High School. After graduating, he served in the United States Marine Corps during World War II, which after his discharge, he attended Seton Hall University, earning his bachelor's degree.

Field served in the New Hampshire House of Representatives from 2002 to 2006.

== Death ==
Field died on June 13, 2022, at his home in Pembroke, New Hampshire, at the age of 95.
