= Hilda Belcher =

American painter

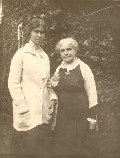
- Hilda and Martha Belcher
- Born: September 20, 1881; Pittsford, Vermont, US
- Died: April 27, 1963
- Known for: Painting

Hilda Belcher (September 20, 1881 – April 27, 1963) was an American painter known for her oils, watercolors, portraits, and illustrations depicting individuals and landscapes, both in formal portraiture and in casual scenes of children and daily life. She was the second woman to be accepted into the National Academy of Design. In 1935, Anne Miller Downes, a reviewer for The New York Times, called Belcher was "one of the most distinguished women artists in America".

== Early years and education ==
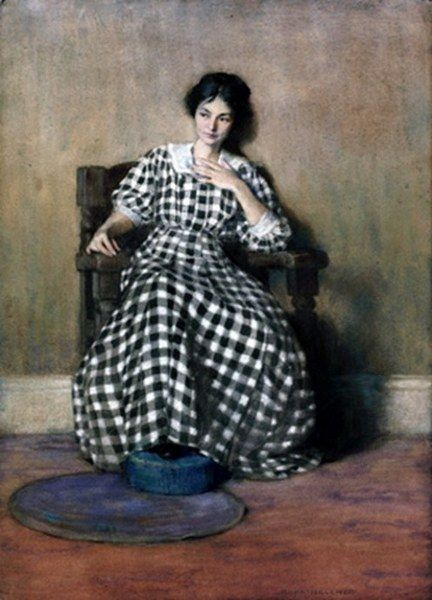
The Checkered Dress (sitter may be Georgia O'Keeffe), 1907

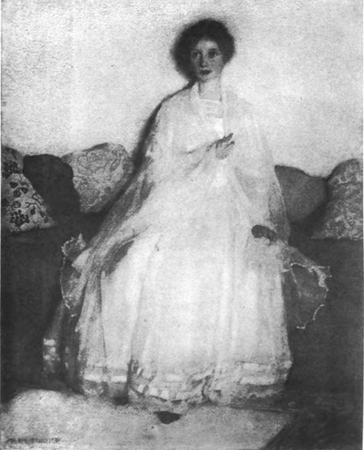
Black and white reproduction of Young Girl in White, Beal prize winner, 1909

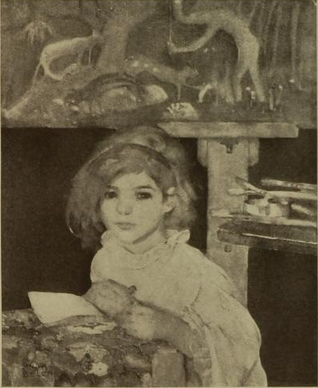
Black and white reproduction of Winifred Hunt, Hudnut Prize, 1915

Born in Pittsford, Vermont, in 1881, Belcher was the oldest child of Martha Wood Belcher, an artist, and Stephen Paterson Belcher, a manufacturer of stained glass. When she was a teenager, the family relocated to Newark, New Jersey, but retained their home in Vermont. Belcher graduated from Newark High School in 1900.

She later moved to New York City where she attended the New York School of Art. She studied with William Merritt Chase, Kenneth Hayes Miller, George Bellows and Robert Henri. She also attended the Art Students League of New York, where she later taught from 1910 to 1912 and again from 1918 to 1921.

== Career ==
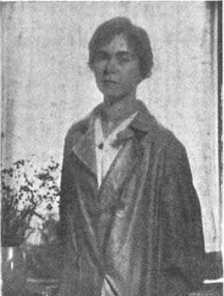
Hilda Belcher, 1921

After the death of her father in 1906, Belcher lived with her mother. In 1907, Belcher submitted The Checkered Dress, which may be an early portrait of Georgia O'Keeffe, to the New York Water Color Club. She became a member, and the painting was reproduced in the International Studio journal. Grace Conkling's poem To the Lady in the checkered dress lauds the choice of both lady and painter, asking "Did you dream, could you know / Snow and shadow upon snow / Thus could lend fantastic grace / To your subtly smiling face?"

In 1908, Belcher won the Strathmore Prize from the New York Water Color Club for The Knitted Shawl. "Her success in capturing the coveted honor fairly took away the breath of the 692 men competitors, who saw themselves obliged to take second place to the young Vermont student," according to The New York Times In 1909, she received the Beal prize for Young Girl in White. In 1910, Belcher was invited by Robert Henri to participate in the Exhibition of Independent Artists, a non-juried, non-prized show. Belcher contributed three works, The Bathing Line, Portrait of Miss Tony Nell, and The Old Ladies.

Belcher and her mother took extended trips to Italy, England, and Wales in 1910; the Rocky Mountains in the western United States in 1912; and Europe, for an eleven-month tour, in 1913–14.

In 1926, Belcher was elected into the National Academy of Design as an Associate member, and became a full member in 1932. She was the second woman to be elected to the National Academy of Design, and in 1931, Belcher received both the Thomas R. Proctor Prize and the Walter Lippincott prize for Portrait by Night. The painting was cut from its frame while on display at the Pennsylvania Academy of the Fine Arts and stolen, and has never been recovered.

Belcher also became well known in Georgia. During the 1920s and 1930s, Belcher often taught and exhibited at the Telfair Academy of Arts and Sciences (1928, 1933 and 1935). There she painted landscapes of the Savannah area and scenes representative of the area's African American culture in the early part of the century. Paintings such as Go Down Moses (1936) and The Choir (1934) are notable for their vibrancy, and for the respect and sensitivity with which Belcher portrayed African-American men, women and children.

Belcher also published illustrations, cartoons, and caricatures that appeared in popular magazines such as Cosmopolitan, Good Housekeeping, and Town and Country, as well as in the catalogs of Sears, Roebuck and Company.

Belcher began to suffer from health problems in the 1940s and rarely exhibited new work after this time. She died on April 27, 1963, in the Orthopedic Hospital, Orange.

During her lifetime, Belcher had more than 28 solo exhibitions. Recently, Belcher's work has been featured in exhibitions at the Telfair Museum of Art (Savannah), the Vermont Historical Society (Montpelier), and the Robert Hull Fleming Museum (Burlington). Her work also can be found in other collections, private and public, including Robert Hull Fleming Museum, Morris Museum of Art, Pennsylvania Academy of the Fine Arts, and the Frances Lehman Loeb Art Center at Vassar College among others.

== Awards ==
- 1908, Strathmore Watercolor Prize, New York Water Color Club, for The Knitted Shawl. The New York Times reported "Girl Painter Wins Prize from 692 Men Competitors".
- 1909, Beal Prize, New York Water Color Club, for Young Girl in White, “the most meritorious color in the exhibition”. She was the second woman to receive this award.
- 1915, Hudnut Prize, American Water Color Society, for Winifred Hunt. (also in 1916 & 1918)
- 1921, member, American Watercolor Society
- 1926, Julia A. Shaw Prize, National Academy of Design, for Scarlet and Blue
- 1926, associate member, National Academy of Design
- 1931, Thomas R. Proctor Prize, National Academy of Design, for Portrait by Night
- 1931, Walter Lippincott prize, Pennsylvania Academy of the Fine Arts, for Portrait by Night
- 1931, Thomas R. Proctor Prize, National Academy of Design
- 1932, full member, National Academy of Design
- 1932, Artist life member of the National Arts Club
- 1935, Dana Watercolor Medal
- 1941, Honorary master's degree from Middlebury College
