= Renauld White =

American actor and model (1944–2024)

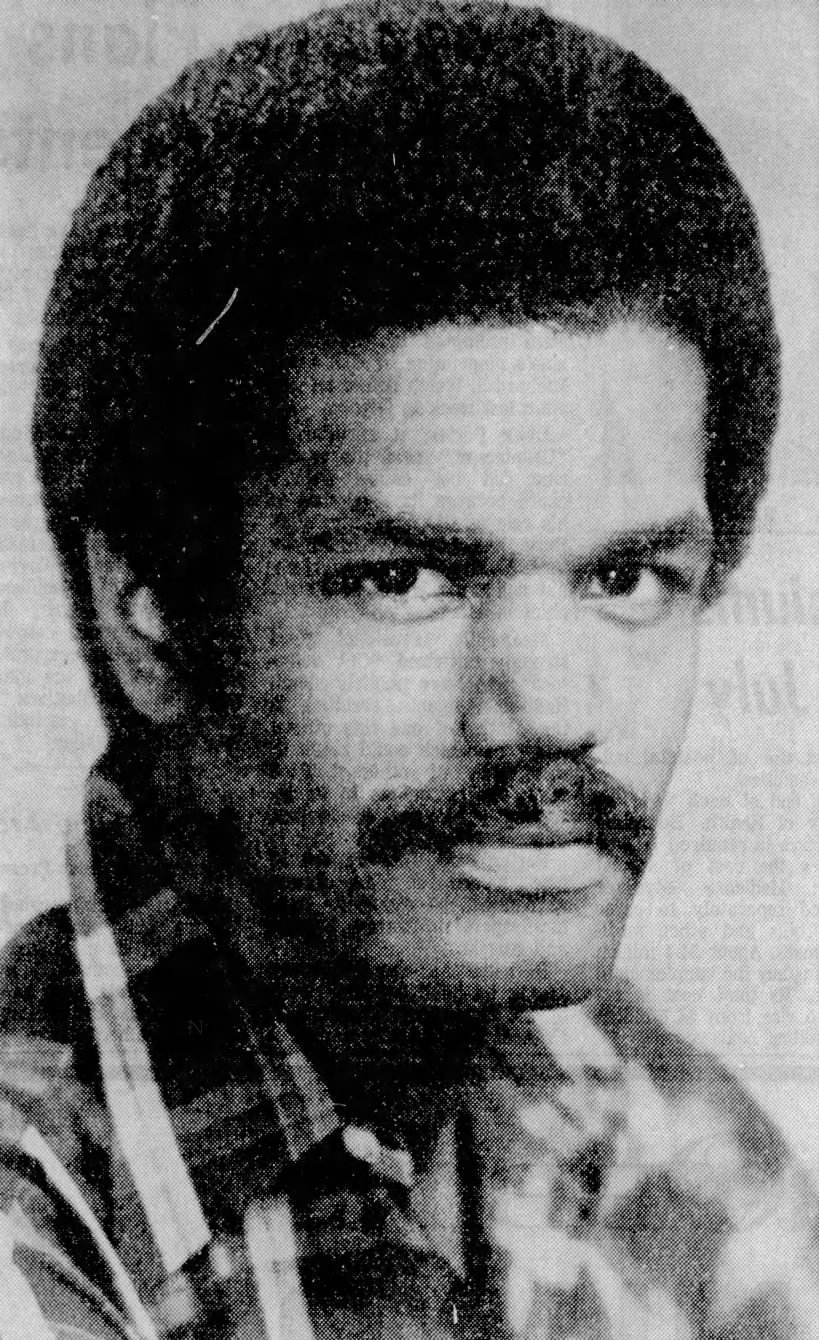
- White in 1976
- Born: February 1, 1944; Newark, New Jersey, U.S.
- Died: June 26, 2024 (aged 80); Manhattan, New York, U.S.
- Occupations: Actor, model
- Height: 6 ft 1 (Note: White was 6 feet 1 in 1982) in (185 cm)

Renauld White (February 1, 1944 – June 26, 2024), also known as Renny, was an American actor and model. He was known for playing the role of William Reynolds in the soap opera television series Guiding Light.

== Life and career ==
White was born and raised in Newark, New Jersey. He attended West Side High School, where he participated in school performances and played on the football team, as well as playing the trombone. He attended Rutgers University.

White worked as a model for designers including Bill Blass, Ralph Lauren, Donna Karan, and Calvin Klein. His appearance on the cover of GQ made him the first Black American model to do so.

From 1986 to 1987, White played the role of William Reynolds in the soap opera television series Guiding Light.

In 2017, White played the role of Christian Lincoln Smith Jr. in the film Central Park.

White died in Manhattan on June 26, 2024, at the age of 80.
