= Honey Lott =

American baseball player (Benjamin Lott; 1925–1980)

- Outfielder
- Born: March 18, 1925; Newark, New Jersey, U.S.
- Died: September 10, 1980 (aged 55); Newark, New Jersey, U.S.
- Batted: Right Threw: Right

Negro league baseball debut
- 1948, for the New York Black Yankees

Last appearance
- 1948, for the New York Black Yankees

Career statistics
- Batting average: .163
- Home runs: 1
- Runs batted in: 4
- Stats at Baseball Reference

Teams
- New York Black Yankees (1948)

Benjamin "Honey" Lott (March 18, 1925 – September 10, 1980) was an American Negro league outfielder in the 1940s.

A native of Newark, New Jersey, Lott attended East Side High School and Florida Normal & Industrial Institute. He played for the New York Black Yankees in 1948, and played minor league baseball into the 1950s with such clubs as the Tulsa Oilers and the Colorado Springs Sky Sox. He also played college football at Florida Normal. Lott died in Newark in 1980 at age 55.
