= Milton W. Brown =

Milton Wolf Brown (1911 – February 6, 1998) was an American artist and art historian. He was the author of American Painting from the Armory Show to the Depression.

Born in Newark, New Jersey, Brown studied art with Leon Kroll and Louis Lozowick. He attended New York University as an undergraduate. He served during World War II as an editor of Stars and Stripes and taught at Brooklyn College after completing his military service. For his dissertation at the New York University Institute of Fine Arts, Brown wrote American Painting From the Armory Show to the Depression, which was published in 1955. In 1971, he helped establish an art history doctoral program at the CUNY Graduate Center, together with John Rewald and Leo Steinberg, and led the program until 1979.

Brown met his wife, the former Blanche Levine, when they both attended the Institute of Fine Arts; they were married in 1938. He died at the age of 86 on February 6, 1998, at Mount Sinai Hospital in Miami Beach, Florida.
