= Ernest Mae McCarroll =

American physician & activist (1898–1990)

Doctor Ernest Mae McCarroll
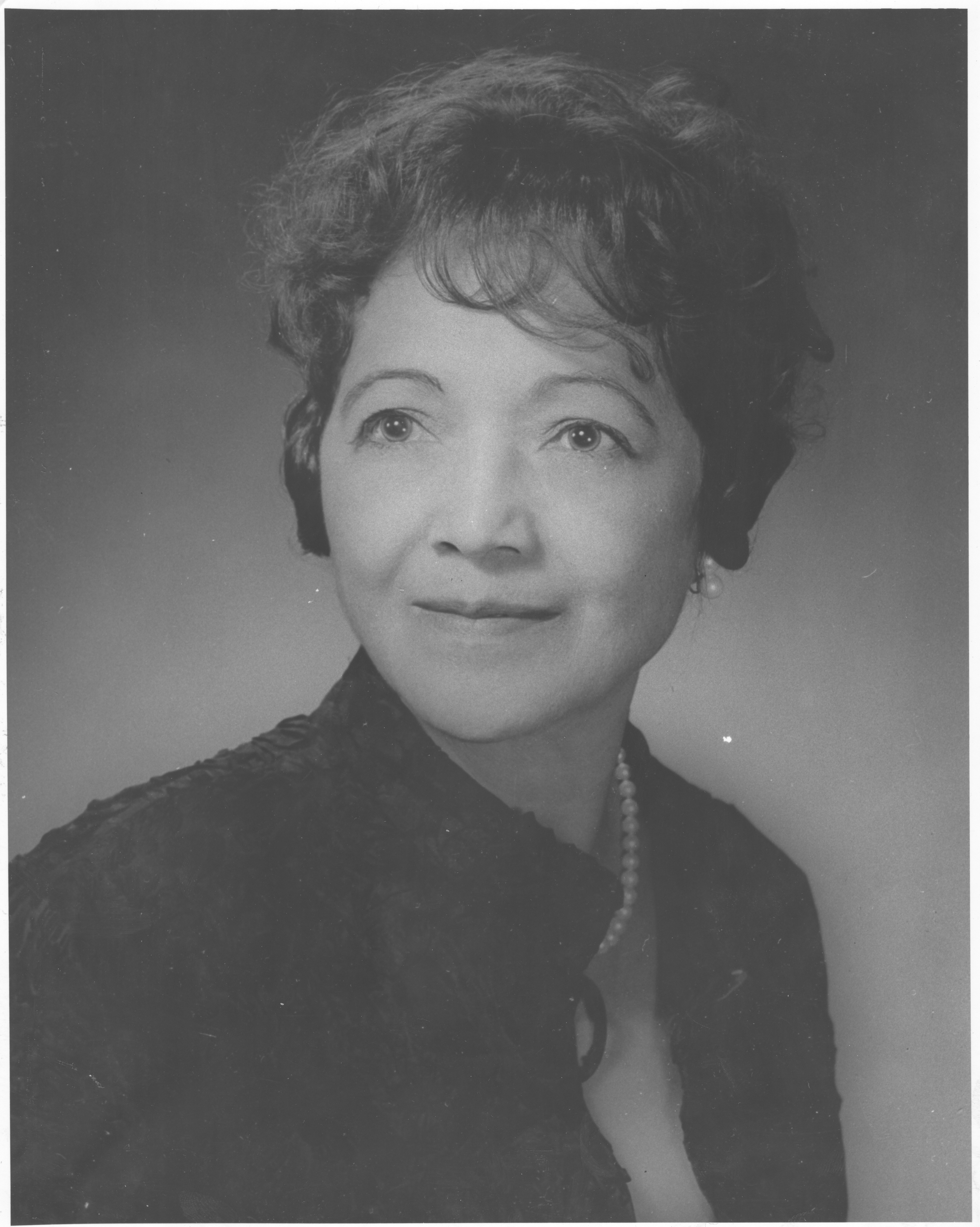
- Born: 29 November 1898; Birmingham, Alabama
- Died: 1990 (aged 91–92)
- Education: Woman’s Medical College of Pennsylvania
- Occupation: Physician
- Years active: 1929-1973
- Employer: Newark City Hospital
- Organization: Newark, New Jersey Board of Health
- Title: First Lady of the National Medical Association

Ernest Mae McCarroll (November 29, 1898 – 1990), a physician in New Jersey, was one of the United States' first African American physicians. She grew up in Birmingham, Alabama, though her education took her through several cities and states. In 1929 she began to practice in New Jersey, where she became the first African American appointed to the Medical Staff at the Newark City Hospital.

McCarroll was a member of many different organizations, both medical and otherwise, such as the National Association for the Advancement of Colored People (NAACP), the League of Women Voters, and the National Medical Association, where she was given the title "first lady".

== Early life and education ==
McCarroll was born in Birmingham, Alabama to Mary and Ernest McCarroll. Her father was a mail carrier. She was the fourth of their six children. She attended public school in the city until receiving her high school education and secondary training at Talladega College, graduating with her Bachelor of Arts in 1917. She then completed her required chemistry and physics courses at Fisk University in Nashville, Tennessee. Soon, she moved to Philadelphia and was awarded her Medical doctorate from Woman's Medical College of Pennsylvania in 1925.

== Medical career ==
After completing her internship in Kansas City, Missouri at the General Hospital No. 2, she started her career in general practice in Philadelphia in 1927. Following her marriage to dentist LeRoy Baxter in 1929, she moved her practice to Newark, New Jersey. Her father-in-law, James Baxter, was the long serving principal of Newark's "Colored" school.

McCarroll was appointed a clinic physician in the Venereal Disease Division of the Newark Department of Health in 1934 due to her efforts in Sexually Transmitted Infection eradication. Eventually, she became the assistant epidemiologist for the city.

In 1939, she went on to earn her Master of Science in Public Health at the Columbia University College of Physicians and Surgeons. She did her postgraduate education at the Harvard School of Public Health. In July 1941, her work "Standard Curative Treatment of Early and Late Syphilis" was published in the Journal of the National Medical Association.

In 1946, the Newark City Hospital appointed her to be a part of their medical staff, making her the first African American to do so. There was a doctor shortage due to World War II at the time that increased the opportunities available to women and African American physicians. Post-war, seven years later, in 1953, she was also named the city's Deputy Health Officer. The Newark Beth Israel Hospital, still functioning under Jim Crow "separate but equal" practices granted her courtesy privileges to practice.

In 1955, the New Jersey Medical Society chose McCarroll as the first physician to be named General Practitioner of the Year.

== Activism ==
McCarroll heralded the effort to end sexually transmitted infections during the early days of Franklin D. Roosevelt's New Deal, when Thomas Parran Jr., notorious for the Tuskegee syphilis experiment, was the Surgeon General of the United States' Public Health Service.

She joined the National Medical Association in 1929 and held multiple positions throughout her career, such as a member of the Board of Trustees for the organization's academic journal (1949-1955 and 1963-1973) and a chairman of the Committee on General Practitioner of the Year Award (from its inception 1955-1968) and the Publication Committee for 32 years. She performed several other services for the organization and was named "First Lady of the NMA".

McCarroll worked on state and local levels as president of the New Jersey Medical Society and the New Jersey State Medical Association. In addition, she was a member of the Essex County Medical Society, the State Medical Association of New Jersey, the American Medical Association, the American Venereal Disease Association, and the American Public Health Association. She also served as the president of the North Jersey Medical Association and the New Jersey Medical Society while medical organization in the south and in Washington, D.C. still barred African Americans.

She also was active as a board member of the Newark branch of the NAACP, the Union League of Essex County, and the Full Neighborhood Guild. She organized the Neighborhood Guild and was a member of the National Alliance of Postal Employees, the Bethany Baptist Church, the League of Women Voters, the Daughters of Elks, and the Delta Sigma Theta sorority. She was a member and fieldworker of the Planned Parenthood Association of New Jersey.

== Honors ==
The North Jersey Medical Society awarded her a plaque in 1955 as its first "General Practitioner of the Year".

In July 1963, she became the first female physician whose picture appeared on the cover of the NMA Journal. At the time, the journal typically only showed recently retired or deceased, but they added her picture to honor her services. Slightly over a decade later, on August 14, 1973, the organization presented her a plaque reading: "In recognition of her dedicated involvement in the affairs of the National Medical Association—Its Publication Committee and Board of Trustees."

The city of Newark named the Department of Health building in her honor: the Haskins/McCarroll Building.
