= Mike Barca =

American soccer player (born 1954)

Personal information
- Full name: Miguel Barca
- Date of birth: January 30, 1954 (age 72)
- Place of birth: Newark, New Jersey, U.S.
- Position: Goalkeeper

Youth career
- 1971–1974: Fairleigh Dickinson University

Senior career*
Years	Team	Apps	(Gls)
1975	Hartford Bicentennials	1	(0)
1976–1978	New Jersey Americans		(0)
1978–1979	Cleveland Force (indoor)	10	(0)
- * Club domestic league appearances and goals

Miguel "Mike" Barca (born January 30, 1954) is an American retired soccer goalkeeper who played professionally in the North American Soccer League, American Soccer League and Major Indoor Soccer League.

Barca attended East Side High School in Newark, New Jersey and Fairleigh Dickinson University where he played on the men's soccer team from 1971 to 1974. He was a 1974 Honorable Mention (third team) All American and graduated in 1975 with a bachelor's degree in mathematics.

Barca turned professional in 1975 with the Hartford Bicentennials of the North American Soccer League. In 1977, he joined the New Jersey Americans of the American Soccer League] where he played two seasons. In 1978, he signed with the Cleveland Force of Major Indoor Soccer League. Barca retired from professional soccer in 1980. In April 1982, Monchik Weber hired Barca as a program manager. In 1984, he moved to AT&T where he held a variety of management positions over the next twenty-two years. He became an independent contractor in 2007.
