= J. LeRoy Baxter =

US politician

James LeRoy Baxter (June 13, 1881 – December 9, 1954) was an American dentist, oral surgeon and state legislator in New Jersey. He was elected to represent Essex County, New Jersey in the New Jersey General Assembly in 1928.

Born in Newark, New Jersey on June 13, 1881, he graduated from Barringer High School. He was the son of James Miller Baxter who served as principal of the Newark's "Colored" school for 45 years.

He was elected as a Republican Party as one of 12 representatives from Essex County, in a General Assembly that had 60 members. While in the Assembly, he was the only Black member and worked with the NAACP and others to oppose a bill that had been introduced by a legislator in Monmouth County to ban marriage between partners of different "races".

He married Ernest Mae McCarroll, a doctor from Alabama, in 1929. She moved to Newark.

In the runup to the 1932 United States presidential election, he spoke at a rally as a former Republican Assemblyman and told a crowd of 250 Black Democrats in Red Bank that the historic overwhelming Black support of Republicans had not brought jobs and other benefits for the Black community and that they should support the Democratic candidates in that year's elections.

In 1940, The Crisis reported on a meeting held where he was branch president of a civil rights organization.

In 1953, Baxter moved to Fontana, California. He died in a San Bernardino hospital on December 9, 1954.
