= Ruth Winter =

American journalist

- Born: May 29, 1930 (age 96); Newark, New Jersey
- Occupations: Journalist, science writer
- Website: ruthwinterinsights.com

Ruth Grosman Winter (born May 29, 1930) is an American journalist and science writer.

== Biography ==
Ruth Grosman was born in Newark, New Jersey. She graduated B.A. from Upsala College in 1951, and obtained a Master of Science from Pace University in 1989.

Winter worked as a journalist (1951–1955) and science editor (1956–1959) for the Newark Star Ledger. She worked as a columnist for the Los Angeles Times Syndicate (1974–1978) and from 1981, the Register and Tribune Syndicate. She has written on food safety, health and medicine. Winter is a past President of the American Society of Journalists and Authors (1977–1978).

She married Arthur Winter, a neurosurgeon, on June 16, 1955; he died in 2011. She has several children.

== Awards and honors ==
She received awards from the Arthritis Foundation, the American Dental Association and the American Society of Anesthesiologists.

== Selected works ==
- Poisons in Your Food (1969)
- How to Reduce Your Medical Bills (1970)
- Beware of the Food You Eat (1971)
- So You Have a Pain in the Neck (1974)
- Don't Panic! (1975)
- The Fragile Bond: Marriage Now (1976)
- The Smell Book (1976)
- Triumph Over Tension (1976)
- A Consumer's Dictionary of Food Additives (1977)
- Scent Talk Among Animals (1977)
- Cancer-Causing Agents: A Preventive Guide (1979)
- The Scientific Case Against Smoking (1980)
- Eat Right Be Bright (1988)
- A Consumer's Dictionary of Household, Yard, and Office Chemicals (1992)
- A Consumer's Dictionary of Medicines (1993)
- Consumer's Guide to Free Medical Information by Phone and by Mail (1993, with Arthur Winter)
- Super Soy: The Miracle Bean (1996)
- A Consumer's Dictionary Of Cosmetic Ingredients (1999)
- Build Your Brain Power (1999, with Arthur Winter)
- Brain Workout (2003, with Arthur Winter)
- So What Can I Eat?! (2006, with Elisa Zied)
- Smart Food: Diet and Nutrition for Maximum Brain Power (2007, with Arthur Winter)
- The Anti-Aging Hormones (2013)
- Vitamin E (2013)
