= Andy Chisick =

American football player (1916–1986)

No. 30
- Position: Center

Personal information
- Born: June 10, 1916; Sagamore, Pennsylvania, U.S.
- Died: March 13, 1986 (aged 69); Somerset, Kentucky, U.S.
- Listed height: 6 ft 1 in (1.85 m)
- Listed weight: 207 lb (94 kg)

Career information
- High school: Good Counsel (NJ)
- College: Villanova
- NFL draft: 1940: 7th round, 51st overall pick

Career history
- Chicago Cardinals (1940–1941)

Career NFL statistics
- Games played: 22
- Stats at Pro Football Reference

Andrew Bernard Chisick (June 10, 1916 – March 13, 1986) was an American professional football center.

Chisick was born in 1916 at Sagamore, Pennsylvania. He grew up in Newark, New Jersey, where he attended Good Counsel High School. He played college football for Villanova from 1937 to 1939. He was "a 60-minute player" at Villanova, playing on both offense and defense.

Chisick was selected by the Chicago Cardinals with the 51st pick in the 1940 NFL draft. He signed with the Cardinals in April 1940, and appeared in 22 NFL games for the club during the 1940 and 1941 seasons.

Chisick enlisted in the United States Marine Corps in February 1942 and participated in four major battles in the Solomon Islands campaign, including the Battle of Cape Gloucester.

Chisick was married to Christine Emma Munsey Chisick. He died at Humana Hospital Lake Cumberland in Kentucky in 1986 at age 69.
