= M. Asli Dukan =

American filmmaker

- Born: Newark, New Jersey, U.S.
- Occupations: Filmmaker, visual artist
- Years active: 1999–present
- Known for: Genre of speculative fiction/afrofuturism

M. Asli Dukan is an American independent media producer, filmmaker and visual artist based in Philadelphia working with themes of speculative fiction and Afrofuturism.

== Early life ==
M. Asli Dukan was born in Newark, New Jersey and has spent most her life living in New York City, where her Caribbean family immigrated to in the early 20th century. Dukan credits her family and childhood for influencing her focus on merging the Black radical tradition in her speculative fiction films and visual art.

== Education ==
M. Asli Dukan has a Media and Communication Arts Master of Fine Arts from the City College of New York awarded in 1999 and a film production Bachelor of Arts from New Jersey City University in 1997. Filmmaker Ayoka Chenzira was one of her professors.

== Career ==
Dukan is faculty at the Community College of Philadelphia. She has also taught at the University of Pennsylvania, the University of the Arts and at the City College of New York.

Dukan says she "embraces the futuristic, fantastic and imaginary genres of speculative fiction (SF) as a way to explore the possibilities of social transformation in society." She has written, produced and directed several short SF films that have screened in film festivals across the country, the Newark International Film Festival, the ImageNation Film and Music Festival, the Langston Hughes Film Festival and the Blackstar Film Festival. She has contributed to a scholarly edited volume about Afrofuturism and its trends in multiple media. She founded Mizan Media Productions, a multimedia company that centers Afro-diasporic fiction and non-fiction narratives, in 2000. Through her production company she has directed and produced short speculative fiction films, as well as videos for indie artists and arts organizations.

The "Resistance Time Portal," her mixed-media, augmented-reality installation centered on Black radicalism in a futuristic narrative, made its debut in the Distance≠Time exhibition at the Icebox Project Space, a contemporary arts and culture venue in Philadelphia.

In 2018 Dukan was a judge for the Glyph Comic Awards.

=== Filmography ===
- They Say… (Short) (2024)
- Sundown Road (Short) (2022)
- Philly Education Stories (Short) (2022)
- Invisible Universe (Expected) (2020)
- Memories from the Future (Short) (2019)
- Resistance: the Battle of Philadelphia (Web series) (2018)
- Resistance: the Battle of Philadelphia (Prologue) (Short) (2017)
- M.O.M.M (Short) (2011)
- 73 (Short) (2008)
- Do You Mind (music video) (2008)
- Boot (music video) (2006)
- Orishas (Short) (2001)

== Awards and honors ==
- Independence Public Media Foundation - Community Voices Grant, 2021
- The Velocity Fund Award, 2021
- Illuminate the Arts Grant, 2021
- Sundance Institute Knight Alumni Grant, 2020
- Independence Public Media Foundation - Community Voices Grant, 2020
- Scribe Video Center - Philadelphia Independent Media Fund, 2020
- Leeway Foundation - Window of Opportunity Grant, 2019
- The Sachs Program for Arts Innovation Grant, 2019
- BlackStar Film Festival - Member Award, 2018
- The Flaherty Seminar – Philadelphia Foundation Fellow, 2018
- Scribe/Philadelphia Independent Media Finishing Fund, 2018
- Leeway Foundation – Transformation Award, 2016
- Black Public Media, NBPC 360 Fellow, 2016, Mentor: Arthur Jafa
- Leeway Foundation – Art and Change Grant, 2016
- The City University of New York Fellowship, 2014
- Leeway Foundation – Art and Change Grant, 2014
- Kitchen Table Giving Circle Grant, 2012
- Urban Artist Initiative Grant, 2009
