= Marc Roberts (politician) =

American politician

Member of the Utah House of Representatives from the 67th district
- In office January 1, 2013 – December 31, 2020
- Preceded by: Patrick Painter
- Succeeded by: Doug Welton

Personal details
- Party: Republican
- Education: Brigham Young University
- Website: marcroberts67.com

Marc K. Roberts is an American politician. He formerly served as a Republican member of the Utah House of Representatives representing District 67 from 2013 to 2020. He lives in Santaquin, Utah with his wife and their four children.

== Early life and education ==
Roberts grew up in Provo, Utah and is the oldest of ten children. He attended Brigham Young University where he earned a bachelor's degree in Civil Engineering and played on the BYU basketball team. He has a real estate license and has worked as a consultant for builders and developers. He is an owner in a successful electronic payments company in Spanish Fork called Platinum Payment Systems and an enterprise technology company called Zift, an electronic payments technology platform.

== Political career ==
Roberts was first elected in November 2012. During the 2016 Legislative Session, he served as the Vice Chair on the House Law Enforcement and Criminal Justice Committee along with sitting on the Natural Resources, Agriculture and Environmental Quality Appropriations Subcommittee, and the House Business and Labor Committee.

== 2016 sponsored legislation ==
Bill	Status
HB 115- Beekeeping Modifications	House/ filed - 3/10/16
HB 144- Food Freedom Act	House/ filed - 3/10/16
HB 176- Motor Vehicle Business Regulation Amendments	House/ filed - 3/10/16
HB 197 - Lobbying by State Agencies Amendments	House/ filed - 3/10/16
HB 271 - Charter School Authorizer Amendments	House/ filed - 3/10/16
HJR 2 - Proposal to Amend Utah Constitution—Right to Food	House/ filed - 3/10/16

Roberts did not floor sponsor any bills in 2016.

== Elections ==
2018

2016

2014 - Roberts was unopposed at the Republican convention and ran unopposed in the November 4, 2016 general election due to Democratic nominee Scott Parkin being disqualified from the ballot.

2012 - District 67 incumbent Republican Patrick Painter ran for Utah State Senate and left the seat open, Roberts was chosen from five candidates at the Republican convention and won the November 6, 2012 General election with 9,454 votes (82%) against Democratic nominee Scott Parkin, who had run for the seat in 2010.
