= Newark Vocational High School =

Vocational high school in Newark, New Jersey, United States

Location
- 301 West Kinney Street; Newark, Essex County, New Jersey 07103; United States; 40.741149°N 74.20292°W

Information
- Type: Public high school
- School district: Newark Public Schools
- NCES School ID: 341134002196
- Principal: Karisa Neis-Lopez
- Faculty: 59.0 FTEs
- Grades: 9-12
- Enrollment: 591 (as of 2024–25)
- Student to teacher ratio: 10.0:1
- Colors: Purple and Gold
- Athletics conference: Super Essex Conference
- Team name: Eagles
- Website: www.nps.k12.nj.us/nwv/

Newark Vocational High School is a four-year comprehensive community public high school in Newark, in Essex County, in the U.S. state of New Jersey, serving students in ninth through twelfth grades, and operating as part of the Newark Public Schools.

As of the 2024–25 school year, the school had an enrollment of 591 students and 59.0 classroom teachers (on an FTE basis), for a student–teacher ratio of 10.0:1. There were 460 students (77.8% of enrollment) eligible for free lunch and 52 (8.8% of students) eligible for reduced-cost lunch.

== CTE programs ==
Newark Vocational High School offers three Career and Technical Education routes for its students: Culinary Arts; Hospitality and Tourism; and Graphic Arts Print and Production. Culinary Arts Students learns in three kitchens including instructional, intermediate, and professional. Newark Vocational has had guest speakers whom are the best in the respective industries speak to the students including Deesha Dyer (Former White House Social Secretary), Bill Yosses (Former White House Pastry Chef), Angella Reid (Former White House Chief Usher), Marshall Jones (Former Sales at Fairmont Hotel / Professor of Hospitality), Aimee Bender (American novelist and short-story writer).

== Athletics ==
The Newark Vocational High School Eagles compete in the Super Essex Conference, which is comprised of public and private high schools in Essex County, and was established following a reorganization of spots leagues in Northern New Jersey under the jurisdiction of the New Jersey State Interscholastic Athletic Association (NJSIAA).

== Administration ==
The school's principal is Karisa Neis-Lopez. Her core administration team includes three vice principals.

== Notable alumni ==
- George A. Tice (1938–2025), photographer, known for his images of people and places in New Jersey
