= Marc Roberts (sports agent) =

American sports agent (born 1959)

- Born: September 20, 1959 (age 66); Newark, New Jersey, U.S.
- Occupation: Sports agent
- Spouse: Marci Lynn Mazzotta
- Children: 2

Marc Roberts (born September 20, 1959) is an American entrepreneur, real estate developer and businessman. He is the first person to take a sports management company public in the United States.

== Biography ==
Roberts was born in Newark, New Jersey, and raised in nearby West Orange. Roberts "got into the agent business" at the age of 19 while attending American University in Washington, D.C., where he played on the university's basketball team. Roberts's teammate, Russell Bowers, was the nation's leading scorer, and Roberts became his agent against his coach's orders. Roberts dropped out of American University after three semesters to focus on being a sports agent full time. (Note: Other sources say that Roberts graduated from American University with a degree in business marketing in 1980.)

Roberts began promoting amateur boxing bouts at Plainfield High School in 1980. At the age of 19, Roberts became the youngest person to promote a professional boxing match. When Roberts was 21 years old, his client Donald Curry won a world championship, his first client to do so. In 1988, Roberts, then aged 28, signed three new boxers, including Ray Mercer and Shannon Briggs. In 1990, Roberts took his sports management company, Triple Threat Enterprises, public on NASDAQ. Roberts later founded Worldwide Entertainment & Sports Corporation, which became the first "full–service sports management company" to go public on NASDAQ.

Roberts developed an interest in real estate and started investing in small projects. In 2000, he moved to Florida where he concentrated on residential real estate. A short few years later, Roberts had completed over $1 billion in condominium conversion projects around the country and was a partner in Sunvest, a condominium conversion company. Roberts'other investments include oceanfront properties in Florida (Singer Island, Fort Lauderdale, South Beach, several intracoastal properties in Palm Beach County) and a 32‐story residential building, called the Metropolitan, on the Upper East Side of Manhattan.

Roberts then shifted to commercial properties in Miami by co‐founding Miami Worldcenter, the second largest mixed use development planned in the United States. Marc Roberts Companies became a real estate investment and development firm with upward of $1 billion in investments. Roberts' portfolio includes over 10 acres of property in Miami contiguous to the Miami Worldcenter Roberts is also a co‐owner of Club E11even, a nightclub and cabaret in Miami.

In 2005, Roberts was honored as Man of the Year by the Crohn's and Colitis Foundation of America.

== Personal life ==
As of 2018, Roberts lives in Miami Beach, Florida with his wife Marci Lynn and two sons, Ryan and Justin Roberts.

== Books ==
- Roberts, Marc (1998). Roberts Rules! : Success Secrets from America's Most Trusted Sports Agent. Career Press. ISBN 1-56414-371-6.
