= List of high schools in New Jersey =

This is a list of high schools, including those open and closed, in the U.S. state of New Jersey.

== Public high schools ==
=== Atlantic County ===
- Absegami High School, Galloway Township
- Atlantic City High School, Atlantic City
- Atlantic County Institute of Technology, Mays Landing in Hamilton Township
- Buena Regional High School, Buena
- Cedar Creek High School, Egg Harbor City
- Egg Harbor Township High School, Egg Harbor Township
- Hammonton High School, Hammonton
- Mainland Regional High School, Linwood
- Oakcrest High School, Mays Landing in Hamilton Township
- Pleasantville High School, Pleasantville

=== Bergen County ===
- Becton Regional High School, East Rutherford
- Bergen County Academies, Hackensack
- Bergen County Technical High School, Paramus Campus, Paramus
- Bergen County Technical High School, Teterboro Campus, Teterboro
- Bergenfield High School, Bergenfield
- Bogota High School, Bogota
- Cliffside Park High School, Cliffside Park
- Cresskill High School, Cresskill
- Dumont High School, Dumont
- Elmwood Park Memorial High School, Elmwood Park
- Emerson Junior-Senior High School, Emerson
- Fair Lawn High School, Fair Lawn
- Fort Lee High School, Fort Lee
- Garfield High School, Garfield
- Glen Rock High School, Glen Rock
- Hackensack High School, Hackensack
- Hasbrouck Heights High School, Hasbrouck Heights
- Indian Hills High School, Oakland
- Leonia High School, Leonia
- Lodi High School, Lodi
- Lyndhurst High School, Lyndhurst
- Mahwah High School, Mahwah
- Midland Park High School, Midland Park
- Dwight Morrow High School, Englewood
- New Milford High School, New Milford
- North Arlington High School, North Arlington
- Northern Highlands Regional High School, Allendale
- Northern Valley Regional High School at Demarest, Demarest
- Northern Valley Regional High School at Old Tappan, Old Tappan
- Palisades Park High School, Palisades Park
- Paramus High School, Paramus
- Park Ridge High School, Park Ridge
- Pascack Hills High School, Montvale
- Pascack Valley High School, Hillsdale
- Ramapo High School, Franklin Lakes
- Ramsey High School, Ramsey
- Ridgefield Memorial High School, Ridgefield
- Ridgefield Park High School, Ridgefield Park
- Ridgewood High School, Ridgewood
- River Dell Regional High School, Oradell
- Rutherford High School, Rutherford
- Saddle Brook High School, Saddle Brook
- Teaneck High School, Teaneck
- Tenafly High School, Tenafly
- Waldwick High School, Waldwick
- Wallington High School, Wallington
- Westwood Regional High School, Westwood
- Wood-Ridge High School, Wood-Ridge

=== Burlington County ===
- Bordentown Regional High School, Bordentown City
- Burlington City High School, Burlington City
- Burlington County Institute of Technology Medford Campus, Medford
- Burlington County Institute of Technology Westampton Campus, Westampton
- Burlington Township High School, Burlington Township
- Cherokee High School, Evesham Township
- Cinnaminson High School, Cinnaminson Township
- Delran High School, Delran Township
- Florence Township Memorial High School, Florence Township
- Lenape High School, Medford
- Maple Shade High School, Maple Shade Township
- Moorestown High School, Moorestown
- Northern Burlington County Regional High School, Columbus in Mansfield Township
- Palmyra High School, Palmyra
- Pemberton Township High School, Pemberton Township
- Rancocas Valley Regional High School, Mount Holly
- Riverside High School, Riverside Township
- Seneca High School, Tabernacle Township
- Shawnee High School, Medford
- Willingboro High School, Willingboro Township

=== Camden County ===
- Audubon High School, Audubon
- Brimm Medical Arts High School, Camden
- Camden Academy Charter High School, Camden
- Camden Big Picture Learning Academy, Camden (formerly MetEast High School)
- Camden County Technical Schools Gloucester Township Campus, Gloucester Township
- Camden County Technical Schools Pennsauken Campus, Pennsauken Township
- Camden High School, Camden
- Cherry Hill High School East, Cherry Hill
- Cherry Hill High School West, Cherry Hill
- Coles High School Program, Cherry Hill
- Collingswood High School, Collingswood
- Creative Arts Academy, Camden
- Eastern Regional High School, Voorhees Township
- Eastside High School, Camden (formerly Woodrow Wilson High School)
- Gloucester City High School, Gloucester City
- Haddon Heights Junior/Senior High School, Haddon Heights
- Haddon Township High School, Haddon Township
- Haddonfield Memorial High School, Haddonfield
- Highland Regional High School, Blackwood in Gloucester Township
- LEAP Academy University Charter School, Camden
- Lindenwold High School, Lindenwold
- Overbrook High School, Pine Hill
- Pennsauken High School, Pennsauken Township
- Sterling High School, Somerdale
- Timber Creek Regional High School, Erial in Gloucester Township
- Triton Regional High School, Runnemede
- Winslow Township High School, Atco in Winslow Township

=== Cape May County ===
- Cape May County Technical High School, Cape May Court House in Middle Township
- Lower Cape May Regional High School, Cape May
- Middle Township High School, Cape May Court House in Middle Township
- Ocean City High School, Ocean City
- Wildwood High School, Wildwood

=== Cumberland County ===
- Bridgeton High School, Bridgeton
- Cumberland County Technology Education Center, Vineland
- Cumberland Regional High School, Seabrook in Upper Deerfield Township
- Millville High School, Millville
- Vineland High School, Vineland

=== Essex County ===
- American History High School, Newark
- Bard High School Early College Newark, Newark
- Barringer High School, Newark
- Belleville High School, Belleville
- Bloomfield High School, Bloomfield
- Bloomfield Tech High School, Bloomfield
- James Caldwell High School, West Caldwell
- Cedar Grove High School, Cedar Grove
- Central High School, Newark
- Columbia High School, Maplewood
- East Orange Campus High School, East Orange
- East Orange STEM Academy, East Orange
- East Side High School, Newark
- Glen Ridge High School, Glen Ridge
- Irvington High School, Irvington
- Livingston High School, Livingston
- Millburn High School, Millburn
- Montclair High School, Montclair
- Newark Arts High School, Newark
- Newark Collegiate Academy, Newark
- Newark School of Data Science and Information Technology, Newark
- Newark Early College High School, Newark
- Newark Tech High School, Newark
- Newark Vocational High School, Newark
- North 13th Street Tech, Newark
- North Star Academy Charter School, Newark
- Nutley High School, Nutley
- Orange High School, Orange
- Science Park High School, Newark
- Malcolm X Shabazz High School, Newark
- Technology High School, Newark
- Cicely Tyson School of Performing and Fine Arts, East Orange
- University High School, Newark
- Verona High School, Verona
- Weequahic High School, Newark
- West Caldwell Tech, West Caldwell
- West Essex High School, North Caldwell
- West Market Street Center, Newark
- West Orange High School, West Orange
- West Side High School, Newark

=== Gloucester County ===
- Clayton High School, Clayton
- Clearview Regional High School, Mullica Hill in Harrison Township
- Delsea Regional High School, Franklinville in Franklin Township
- Deptford Township High School, Deptford Township
- Gateway Regional High School, Woodbury Heights
- Glassboro High School, Glassboro
- Gloucester County Institute of Technology, Sewell in Mantua Township
- Kingsway Regional High School, Woolwich Township
- Paulsboro High School, Paulsboro
- Pitman High School, Pitman
- Washington Township High School, Washington Township
- West Deptford High School, West Deptford Township
- Williamstown High School, Williamstown in Monroe Township
- Woodbury Junior-Senior High School, Woodbury

=== Hudson County ===
- Bayonne High School, Bayonne
- County Prep High School, Jersey City
- William L. Dickinson High School, Jersey City
- James J. Ferris High School, Jersey City
- Harrison High School, Harrison
- Hoboken High School, Hoboken
- High Tech High School, Secaucus
- Infinity Institute, Jersey City
- José Martí STEM Academy, Union City
- Kearny High School, Kearny
- Liberty High School, Jersey City
- Lincoln High School, Jersey City
- Dr. Ronald E. McNair Academic High School, Jersey City
- Memorial High School, West New York
- North Bergen High School, North Bergen
- Secaucus High School, Secaucus
- Henry Snyder High School, Jersey City
- University Academy Charter High School, Jersey City
- Union City High School, Union City
- Weehawken High School, Weehawken

=== Hunterdon County ===
- Delaware Valley Regional High School, Frenchtown
- Hunterdon Central Regional High School, Flemington
- Hunterdon County Polytech Career Academy, Raritan Township
- North Hunterdon High School, Annandale in Clinton Township
- South Hunterdon Regional High School, Lambertville
- Voorhees High School, Glen Gardner

=== Mercer County ===
- Capital City High School, Trenton
- Ewing High School, Ewing Township
- Hamilton High School West, Hamilton Township
- Hightstown High School, Hightstown
- Hopewell Valley Central High School, Hopewell Township
- Marie H. Katzenbach School for the Deaf, West Trenton in Ewing Township
- Lawrence High School, Lawrenceville in Lawrence Township
- Nottingham High School, Hamilton Township (also known as Hamilton High School North)
- Princeton High School, Princeton
- Robbinsville High School, Robbinsville
- Steinert High School, Hamilton Township (also known as Hamilton High School East)
- Trenton Central High School, Trenton
- Trenton Central High School West, Trenton
- West Windsor-Plainsboro High School South, Princeton Junction in West Windsor

=== Middlesex County ===
- Carteret High School, Carteret
- Colonia High School, Colonia in Woodbridge Township
- Dunellen High School, Dunellen
- East Brunswick High School, East Brunswick
- East Brunswick Magnet School, East Brunswick
- Edison Academy Magnet School, Edison
- Edison High School, Edison
- Highland Park High School, Highland Park
- John F. Kennedy Memorial High School, Iselin in Woodbridge Township
- Metuchen High School, Metuchen
- Middlesex High School, Middlesex
- Monroe Township High School, Monroe Township
- New Brunswick Health Sciences Technology High School, New Brunswick
- New Brunswick High School, New Brunswick
- North Brunswick Township High School, North Brunswick
- Old Bridge High School, Old Bridge
- Perth Amboy High School, Perth Amboy
- Perth Amboy Magnet School, Perth Amboy
- Piscataway High School, Piscataway
- Piscataway Magnet School, Piscataway
- Sayreville War Memorial High School, Parlin in Sayreville
- South Amboy Middle High School, South Amboy
- South Brunswick High School, Monmouth Junction in South Brunswick
- South Plainfield High School, South Plainfield
- South River High School, South River
- Spotswood High School, Spotswood
- J.P. Stevens High School, Edison
- West Windsor-Plainsboro High School North, Plainsboro
- Woodbridge Academy Magnet School, Woodbridge Township
- Woodbridge High School, Woodbridge Township

=== Monmouth County ===
- Academy Charter High School, Lake Como
- Academy of Allied Health & Science, Neptune Township
- Allentown High School, Allentown
- Asbury Park High School, Asbury Park
- Biotechnology High School, Freehold Township
- Class Academy, Long Branch
- Colts Neck High School, Colts Neck Township
- Communications High School, Wall Township
- Freehold High School, Freehold Borough
- Freehold Township High School, Freehold Township
- High Technology High School, Lincroft in Middletown Township
- Holmdel High School, Holmdel Township
- Howell High School, Farmingdale
- Henry Hudson Regional High School, Highlands
- Keansburg High School, Keansburg
- Keyport High School, Keyport
- Long Branch High School, Long Branch
- Manalapan High School, Englishtown
- Manasquan High School, Manasquan
- Marine Academy of Science and Technology, Sandy Hook in Middletown Township
- Marlboro High School, Marlboro Township
- Matawan Regional High School, Aberdeen Township
- Middletown High School North, Middletown Township
- Middletown High School South, Middletown Township
- Monmouth County Vocational Technical High School, Colts Neck Township
- Monmouth Regional High School, Tinton Falls
- Neptune High School, Neptune Township
- Ocean Township High School, Oakhurst in Ocean Township
- Raritan High School, Hazlet
- Red Bank Regional High School, Little Silver
- Rumson-Fair Haven Regional High School, Rumson
- Shore Regional High School, West Long Branch
- Wall High School, Wall Township

=== Morris County ===
- Academy for Law and Public Safety, Butler
- The Academy for Mathematics, Science, and Engineering, Rockaway
- Boonton High School, Boonton
- Butler High School, Butler
- Chatham High School, Chatham Township
- Dover High School, Dover
- Hanover Park High School, East Hanover
- Jefferson Township High School, Oak Ridge in Jefferson Township
- Kinnelon High School, Kinnelon
- Madison High School, Madison
- Montville Township High School, Montville
- Morris County School of Technology, Denville Township
- Morris Hills High School, Rockaway
- Morris Knolls High School, Denville Township
- Morristown High School, Morristown
- Mount Olive High School, Flanders in Mount Olive Township
- Mountain Lakes High School, Mountain Lakes
- Parsippany High School, Parsippany-Troy Hills
- Parsippany Hills High School, Morris Plains
- Pequannock Township High School, Pompton Plains
- Randolph High School, Randolph
- Roxbury High School, Succasunna in Roxbury
- West Morris Central High School, Long Valley in Washington Township
- West Morris Mendham High School, Mendham Borough
- Whippany Park High School, Whippany in Hanover Township

=== Ocean County ===
- Barnegat High School, Barnegat Township
- Brick Township High School, Brick Township
- Brick Memorial High School, Brick
- Central Regional High School, Bayville in Berkeley Township
- Grunin Performing Arts Academy, Toms River
- Jackson Township High School, Jackson (merger of Jackson Liberty High School and Jackson Memorial High School)
- Lacey Township High School, Lanoka Harbor in Lacey Township
- Lakewood High School, Lakewood Township
- Manchester Township High School, Manchester Township
- Marine Academy of Technology and Environmental Science, Manahawkin in Stafford Township
- New Egypt High School, New Egypt in Plumsted Township
- Pinelands Regional High School, Tuckerton
- Point Pleasant Beach High School, Point Pleasant Beach
- Point Pleasant Borough High School, Point Pleasant
- Southern Regional High School, Manahawkin in Stafford Township
- Toms River High School East, Toms River
- Toms River High School North, Toms River
- Toms River High School South, Toms River

=== Passaic County ===
- Academy High School, Clifton
- Clifton High School, Clifton
- Eastside High School, Paterson
  - School of Culinary Arts, Hospitality and Tourism
  - School of Government and Public Administration
  - School of Information Technology
- HARP Academy, Paterson
- Hawthorne High School, Hawthorne
- International High School, Paterson
- John F. Kennedy High School, Paterson
  - School of Architecture and Construction Trades
  - School of Business, Technology, Marketing and Finance
  - School of Education and Training
  - School of Science, Technology, Engineering and Mathematics
- Lakeland Regional High School, Wanaque
- Diana C. Lobosco STEM Academy, Wayne
- Manchester Regional High School, Haledon
- Garrett Morgan Academy, Paterson
- MPACT Academy, Paterson
- Rosa L. Parks School of Fine and Performing Arts, Paterson
- Passaic Academy for Science and Engineering, Passaic
- Passaic County Technical Institute, Wayne
- Passaic High School, Passaic
- Passaic Preparatory Academy, Passaic
- Passaic Valley Regional High School, Little Falls
- Paterson Charter School for Science and Technology, Paterson
- Paterson P-TECH High School, Paterson
- Pompton Lakes High School, Pompton Lakes
- Public Safety Academy, Paterson
- Sports and Business Academy, Paterson
- Wayne Hills High School, Wayne
- Wayne Valley High School, Wayne
- West Milford High School, West Milford

=== Salem County ===
- Arts, Science, and Technology High School, Woodstown
- Penns Grove High School, Carneys Point Township
- Pennsville Memorial High School, Pennsville
- Salem County Career and Technical High School, Pilesgrove Township
- Salem High School, Salem
- Arthur P. Schalick High School, Pittsgrove Township
- Woodstown High School, Woodstown

=== Somerset County ===
- Bernards High School, Bernardsville
- Bound Brook High School, Bound Brook
- Bridgewater-Raritan High School, Bridgewater
- Central Jersey College Prep Charter School, Somerset in Franklin Township
- Franklin High School, Somerset
- Hillsborough High School, Hillsborough Township
- Manville High School, Manville
- Montgomery High School, Montgomery Township
- North Plainfield High School, North Plainfield
- Ridge High School, Basking Ridge in Bernards Township
- Somerset County Vocational and Technical High School, Bridgewater
- Somerville High School, Somerville
- Watchung Hills Regional High School, Warren Township

=== Sussex County ===
- High Point Regional High School, Sussex
- Hopatcong High School, Hopatcong
- Kittatinny Regional High School, Hampton Township
- Lenape Valley Regional High School, Stanhope
- Newton High School, Newton
- Sparta High School, Sparta
- Sussex County Technical School, Sparta
- Vernon Township High School, Vernon Township
- Wallkill Valley Regional High School, Hamburg

=== Union County ===
- David Brearley High School, Kenilworth
- Abraham Clark High School, Roselle
- Cranford High School, Cranford
- Jonathan Dayton High School, Springfield Township
- Elizabeth academies
  - J. Christian Bollwage Finance Academy
  - John E. Dwyer Technology Academy
  - Thomas A. Edison Career and Technical Academy
  - Elizabeth High School
  - Admiral William Halsey Leadership Academy
  - Alexander Hamilton Preparatory Academy
  - Thomas Jefferson Arts Academy
- Governor Livingston High School, Berkeley Heights
- Hillside High School, Hillside
- Arthur L. Johnson High School, Clark
- Linden High School, Linden
- New Providence High School, New Providence
- Barack Obama Green Charter High School, Plainfield
- Plainfield Academy for the Arts and Advanced Studies, Plainfield
- Plainfield High School, Plainfield
- Rahway High School, Rahway
- Roselle Park High School, Roselle Park
- Scotch Plains-Fanwood High School, Scotch Plains
- Summit High School, Summit
- Union County Academy for Allied Health Sciences, Scotch Plains
- Union County Academy for Information Technology, Scotch Plains
- Union County Academy for Performing Arts, Scotch Plains
- Union County Magnet High School, Scotch Plains
- Union County Vocational-Technical High School, Scotch Plains
- Union Senior High School, Union Township
- Westfield High School, Westfield

=== Warren County ===
- Belvidere High School, Belvidere (9-12)
- Hackettstown High School, Hackettstown (9-12)
- North Warren Regional High School, Blairstown (7-12)
- Phillipsburg High School, Phillipsburg (9-12)
- Warren County Technical School, Washington (9-12)
- Warren Hills Regional High School, Washington (9-12)

== Defunct public high schools ==
- Closter High School, Closter (closed 1955)
- East Rutherford High School, East Rutherford (closed 1971)
- Paulo Freire Charter School, Newark (closed 2018)
- Create Charter High School, Jersey City (closed as of June 2010)
- M.E.T.S. Charter School, Jersey City (closed 2020)
- Capital Preparatory Charter High School, Trenton (closed as of June 2011)
- Academy for Urban Leadership Charter High School, Perth Amboy (closed 2025)
- Chatham Borough High School, Chatham Borough (closed 1988 and merged to form Chatham High School)
- Chatham Township High School, Chatham Township (closed 1988 and merged to form Chatham High School)

== Private high schools ==
=== Atlantic County ===
- Atlantic Christian School, Egg Harbor Township
- Champion Baptist Academy, Absecon
- Coastal Learning Center Atlantic, Northfield
- Holy Spirit High School, Absecon
- Life Mission Training Center, Hammonton
- St. Augustine Preparatory School, Richland
- St. Joseph Academy, Hammonton
- The Pilgrim Academy, Egg Harbor City
- Trocki Jewish Community Day School, Egg Harbor Township

=== Bergen County ===
- Academy of the Holy Angels, Demarest
- Barnstable Academy, Oakland
- Bergen Catholic High School, Oradell
- Community High School, Teaneck
- Don Bosco Preparatory High School, Ramsey
- Dwight-Englewood School, Englewood
- Frisch School, Paramus
- Hackensack Christian School, Hackensack
- Heichal HaTorah, Teaneck
- Holmstead School, Ridgewood
- High Point School of Bergen County, Lodi
- Immaculate Heart Academy, Washington Township
- Ma'ayanot Yeshiva High School, Teaneck
- Paramus Catholic High School, Paramus
- Sage Day School, Rochelle Park
- Saint Joseph Regional High School, Montvale
- St. Mary High School, Rutherford
- Saddle River Day School, Saddle River
- Torah Academy of Bergen County, Teaneck
- Yeshiva Ohr Hatalmud, Englewood

=== Burlington County ===
- Calvary Christian School, Willingboro
- Doane Academy, Burlington (K-12)
- Hampton Academy, Mount Holly
- Heritage Christian Academy, Mount Laurel
- Holy Cross Preparatory Academy, Delran
- Life Center Academy, Burlington
- Moorestown Friends School, Moorestown

=== Camden County ===
- Bancroft School at Voorhees Pediatric Facility, Voorhees
- Baptist Regional School, Haddon Heights
- Bishop Eustace Preparatory School, Pennsauken
- Brookfield Academy, Cherry Hill
- Camden Catholic High School, Cherry Hill
- Gloucester Catholic High School, Gloucester City
- The King's Christian School, Cherry Hill
- Kingsway Learning Center Haddonfield Campus, Haddonfield
- Paul VI High School, Haddonfield
- UrbanPromise Academy, Camden
- Yeshiva of Cherry Hill, Cherry Hill

=== Cape May County ===
- Families United Network Academy, Tuckahoe
- Southern Cape Christian School, Cape May Court House
- Wildwood Catholic High School, Wildwood

=== Essex County ===
- Ahlus Sunnah School, East Orange
- Al-Ghazaly High School, Fairfield
- Chad Science Academy, Newark
- Essex Valley School, West Caldwell
- Golda Och Academy, West Orange (formerly Solomon Schechter Day School of Essex and Union)
- The Gramon School, Fairfield
- Immaculate Conception High School, Montclair
- Independence High School, Irvington
- Jersey Preparatory School, Newark
- Rae Kushner Yeshiva High School, Livingston
- Lacordaire Academy, Upper Montclair
- The Milton School, Millburn
- Montclair Kimberley Academy, Montclair
- Mount Saint Dominic Academy, West Caldwell
- Newark Academy, Livingston
- Saint Benedict's Preparatory School, Newark
- St. James Preparatory School, Newark
- St. Leo's Center, Irvington
- St. Vincent Academy, Newark
- Seton Hall Preparatory School, West Orange

=== Gloucester County ===
- Gloucester County Christian School, Sewell
- Our Lady of Mercy Academy, Newfield

=== Hudson County ===
- Hudson Catholic Regional High School, Jersey City
- The Hudson School, Hoboken
- Kenmare High School, Jersey City
- Messiah Christian High School, Bayonne
- Miftaahul Uloom Academy, Union City
- St. Dominic Academy, Jersey City
- St. Peter's Preparatory School, Jersey City
- Yeshiva Gedolah School of Bayonne, Bayonne

=== Mercer County ===
- Hun School of Princeton, Princeton
- Islamic School of Trenton, Trenton
- Lawrenceville School, Lawrenceville/Lawrence Township
- The Lewis School of Princeton, Princeton
- Notre Dame High School, Lawrenceville/Lawrence Township
- Peddie School, Hightstown
- The Pennington School, Pennington
- Princeton Day School, Princeton
- Princeton International School of Mathematics and Science, Princeton
- Stuart Country Day School, Princeton
- Trenton Catholic Academy, Trenton
- Villa Victoria Academy, Ewing
- Wilberforce School, Princeton Junction

=== Middlesex County ===
- Al-Minhaal Academy, South Plainfield
- Moshe Aaron Yeshiva High School, South River
- Rabbi Jacob Joseph Yeshiva School, Edison
- Noor-Ul-Iman School, Monmouth Junction
- St. Joseph High School, Metuchen
- St. Thomas Aquinas High School, Edison (renamed from Bishop George Ahr High School in 2019)
- Timothy Christian School, Piscataway
- Wardlaw-Hartridge School, Edison
- Yeshiva Tiferes Naftoli, Jamesburg
- HEROES Academy for the Gifted, New Brunswick

=== Monmouth County ===
- Baytul-Iman Academy, Matawan
- Christian Brothers Academy, Lincroft
- Collier High School, Wickatunk
- High Point Schools, Morganville
- Hillel Yeshiva, Ocean
- Ilan High School, Long Branch
- Jersey Shore Free School, a Sudbury school, Marlboro/Colts Neck, NJ
- New Jersey United Christian Academy, Cream Ridge
- Ranney School, Tinton Falls
- Red Bank Catholic High School, Red Bank
- St. George Orthodox Christian High School, Howell
- St. John Vianney High School, Holmdel
- St. Rose High School, Belmar
- Talmudical Academy of Central New Jersey, Howell
- Trinity Hall, Tinton Falls

=== Morris County ===
- Academy of Saint Elizabeth, Morris Township
- The Craig School, Lincoln Park
- Delbarton School, Morris Township
- Morris Catholic High School, Denville
- Morristown–Beard School, Morristown
- Sage Day School, Boonton
- Shepard School, Morristown
- Trinity Christian School, Montville
- Villa Walsh Academy, Morris Township

=== Ocean County ===
- Bais Kaila Torah Preparatory High School for Girls, Lakewood
- Bais Shaindel High School, Lakewood
- Bais Yaakov High School, Lakewood
- Bnos Bais Yaakov High School, Lakewood
- Donovan Catholic High School, Toms River (known as Monsignor Donovan High School until 2014)
- Mesivta High School of Bradley, Lakewood
- Mesivta Keser Torah School, Lakewood
- Mesivta of Lakewood School, Lakewood
- Mesivta Pe'er Hatorah School, Lakewood
- New Jersey Center for Judaic Study, Lakewood
- Ohr Chodosh School, Lakewood
- Yeshiva Bais Aharon School, Lakewood
- Yeshiva Birchas Chaim, Lakewood

=== Passaic County ===
- Al-Huda School, Paterson
- Bais Yaakov of Passaic High School, Passaic
- Benway School, Wayne
- Collegiate School, Passaic
- DePaul Catholic High School, Wayne
- Eastern Christian High School, North Haledon
- Hawthorne Christian Academy, Hawthorne
- Mary Help of Christians Academy, North Haledon
- Mesivta Zichron Baruch, Clifton
- Pioneer Academy, Wayne

=== Somerset County ===
- East Mountain School, Belle Mead
- Gill St. Bernard's School, Gladstone
- Green Brook Academy, Bound Brook
- Immaculata High School, Somerville
- Mount St. Mary Academy, Watchung
- Pingry School, Martinsville
- Rutgers Preparatory School, Somerset
- Sage Day High School, Franklin
- Somerset Christian Academy, Somerset

=== Sussex County ===
- Pope John XXIII High School, Sparta
- Veritas Christian Academy, Sparta

=== Union County ===
- Bruriah High School for Girls, Elizabeth
- Cornerstone Day School
- Hillcrest Academy, Scotch Plains
- Jewish Educational Center, Elizabeth
- Kent Place School, Summit
- Mother Seton Regional High School, Clark
- Oak Knoll School of the Holy Child, Summit
- Oratory Preparatory School, Summit
- Rav Teitz Mesivta Academy, Elizabeth
- Roselle Catholic High School, Roselle
- Union Catholic Regional High School, Scotch Plains

=== Warren County ===
- Blair Academy, Blairstown

== Defunct private high schools ==
- Immaculate Conception High School, Lodi (closed 2023)
- Metro Schechter Academy, Teaneck (closed 2006)
- Newbury Academy, Dumont (closed 2009)
- Queen of Peace High School, North Arlington (closed 2017)
- Schechter Regional High School, Teaneck (closed 2007)
- Sacred Heart High School, Vineland (closed 2013)
- Christ the King Preparatory School, Newark (closed 2020)
- Essex Catholic High School, Newark (closed 2003)
- Marylawn of the Oranges High School, South Orange (closed 2013)
- Our Lady of Good Counsel High School, Newark (closed 2006)
- Victory Christian School, Williamstown (closed 2010)
- Academy of St. Aloysius, Jersey City (closed 2006)
- Academy of the Sacred Heart, Hoboken (closed 2006)
- Caritas Academy, Jersey City (closed 2008)
- Holy Family Academy, Bayonne (closed 2013)
- Marist High School, Bayonne (closed June 2020)
- St. Aloysius High School, Jersey City (closed 2007)
- St. Anthony High School, Jersey City (closed 2017)
- Saint Joseph of the Palisades High School, West New York (closed 2009)
- St. Mary High School, Jersey City (closed 2011)
- St. Mary's Cathedral High School, Trenton (closed 1972)
- Cardinal McCarrick High School, South Amboy (closed in 2015 in the wake of an increasing financial deficit)
- St. Peter the Apostle High School, New Brunswick (closed 2007)
- Mater Dei High School, Middletown (closed 2022)
- Monmouth Academy, Howell (closed 2011)
- Bayley-Ellard High School, Madison (closed 2005)
- Parsippany Christian School, Morris Plains (closed 2019)
- Don Bosco Technical High School, Paterson (closed 2002)
- Neumann Preparatory School, Wayne (closed 1990)
- Paterson Catholic High School, Paterson (closed 2010)
- Paul VI High School, Clifton (closed 1970)
- Pope Pius XII High School, Passaic (closed 1983)
- Purnell School, Pottersville (closed in 2021)
- Benedictine Academy, Elizabeth (closed 2020)
- St. Mary of the Assumption High School, Elizabeth (closed 2019)
- The Patrick School, Elizabeth (established after St. Patrick High School closed 2002)
- Phillipsburg Catholic High School, Phillipsburg (closed 1994)

== See also ==
- List of school districts in New Jersey
