= Donald M. Payne Sr. School of Technology =

Essex County Donald M. Payne Sr. School of Technology

Location
- Location in Newark, New Jersey
- 498–544 West Market Street; Newark, New Jersey; United States; 40.75159°N 74.19497°W

Information
- Type: Public vocational-technical high school
- Opened: September 2018
- School district: Essex County Schools of Technology
- NCES School ID: 340480002074
- Principal: Eric Love
- Faculty: 93.0 FTEs
- Enrollment: 1,230 (as of 2024–25)
- Student to teacher ratio: 13.2:1
- Campus type: Urban
- Colors: Navy blue Athletic gold
- Nickname: Lions
- Website: Official website

The Essex County Donald M. Payne Sr. School of Technology, commonly known as the Donald M. Payne Sr. School of Technology or Payne Tech, is a public vocational-technical high school in Newark, New Jersey. It is operated by the Essex County Schools of Technology and serves students in grades 9 through 12. The school is located at 498–544 West Market Street.

The school opened in September 2018 and was named in honor of Donald M. Payne Sr., who represented New Jersey's 10th congressional district in the United States House of Representatives from 1989 until his death in 2012. Payne was the first African American elected to Congress from New Jersey.

As of the 2024–25 school year, the school had an enrollment of 1,230 students and 93.0 classroom teachers (on an FTE basis), for a student–teacher ratio of 13.2:1. There were 781 students (63.5% of enrollment) eligible for free lunch and 122 (9.9% of students) eligible for reduced-cost lunch. The school's student population is 51.6% Black and 44.5% Hispanic or Latino.

Payne Tech's athletic teams are known as the Lions. The school's athletic colors are navy blue and athletic gold.

== History ==
=== Predecessor schools ===
The Donald M. Payne Sr. School of Technology was established as part of efforts by the Essex County vocational-technical school system to modernize its then-existing schools, including Bloomfield Tech High School in Bloomfield, New Jersey and North 13th Street Tech in Newark.

North 13th Street Tech, built in 1928, was one of the older schools operated by the district and was considered outdated.

Bloomfield Tech High School was built in 1930. Bloomfield Tech had been named a National Blue Ribbon School by the United States Department of Education during the 2009–10 school year.

=== Consolidation and construction ===
The need for a modern Essex County vocational-technical school facility had been discussed for more than 40 years before construction of Payne Tech began. In June 2015, Essex County officials announced plans to close Bloomfield Tech and North 13th Street Tech and replace them with a new vocational-technical high school in Newark. County officials cited the age and condition of the existing facilities as reasons for the consolidation. Construction of the new school began in 2016.

The new school in Newark's West Ward was built as a 320,000-square-foot (30,000 m^{2}), three-story facility combining traditional academic classrooms with specialized career and technical education spaces. The school included an 800-seat auditorium, two gymnasiums, and a synthetic-turf athletic field constructed above an underground parking garage. The project was funded through a partnership between Essex County and the State of New Jersey, with the state covering 90 percent of the acquisition, design, and construction costs. The county planned to fund the balance through the sale of the former North 13th Street and Bloomfield Tech properties.

The new school was named in honor of Donald M. Payne Sr., who represented New Jersey's 10th congressional district in the United States House of Representatives from 1989 until his death in 2012. Payne was the first African American elected to Congress from New Jersey.

Bloomfield Tech and North 13th Street Tech closed as part of the transition to the new school. The school opened in September 2018, becoming the new home for 1,100 students from the former Bloomfield Tech and North 13th Street campuses.

Bloomfield, New Jersey, paid $10 million to acquire the former Bloomfield Tech location in December 2023.

== Academics ==
Payne Tech combines a traditional academic high school curriculum with career and technical education (CTE). Students participate in academic coursework along with instruction in a career and technical field. The district offers Advanced Placement and college-level educational opportunities to its students.

Career and technical programs at Payne Tech include Allied Health, Music Production, Computer Science, Business Management, Law and Public Safety, Graphic Arts and Design, Green Energy, Television Production, Dental Science, Automotive Technology, Robotics, Information Technology, Construction Trades, Engineering, Architectural Drafting, Agricultural Science, Culinary Arts, Animal Science, Manufacturing, Fashion Design, and Cosmetology.

In the 2023–24 school year, Payne Tech was selected as one of 15 New Jersey schools to pilot the new Advanced Placement African American Studies course. The school was also recognized among high-performing New Jersey high schools by U.S. News & World Report.

== Student organizations ==
Student organizations at the school include the Multicultural Club, Mock Trial, Drama, Book Club, Future Business Leaders of America (FBLA), Literary Magazine, SkillsUSA, Scholars, Choir, Yoga, Video, Bible Club, GLSEN, Step, Art, Student Council, Yearbook, Robotics, Model United Nations, Girls Who Code, Anime, Dance, and other extracurricular organizations.

The school's Black Student Union has participated in discussions concerning African American studies and student representation.

== Athletics ==
Payne Tech's athletic teams compete as the Payne Tech Lions and participate in the Super Essex Conference (SEC), an athletic conference serving high schools in Essex County and surrounding areas. The Essex County Schools of Technology operates athletics across its three campuses: Payne Tech, Newark Tech, and West Caldwell Tech.

Sports offered at Payne Tech include:

- Baseball
- Boys' basketball
- Girls' basketball
- Bowling
- Boys' cross country
- Girls' cross country
- Boys' soccer
- Girls' soccer
- Boys' volleyball
- Girls' volleyball
- Boys' track and field
- Girls' track and field
- Indoor track and field
- Girls' softball
- Girls' flag football
- Cheerleading

=== Flag football ===
Girls' flag football initially operated as a district-wide girls flag football team with players from the district's three campuses In 2023, the district received flag football equipment and uniforms from the New York Jets.

The New Jersey State Interscholastic Athletic Association (NJSIAA) classified it as a provisional sport beginning with the 2022–23 school year and voted to make girls' flag football an interscholastic sport beginning with the 2026–27 school year.

=== Basketball ===
The Payne Tech boys' basketball team has been one of the school's most successful athletic programs. In the 2024–25 season, Payne Tech finished 21–8 and reached the Essex County Tournament championship game for the first time in school history. The Lions defeated Newark Arts High School in the semifinal before losing to Seton Hall Preparatory School in the finals.

In the 2025 NJSIAA North II Group III tournament, Payne Tech reached the sectional semifinals before losing to West Morris Mendham High School by a score of 57–56.

The 2024–25 boys' basketball team finished the season ranked 31st in the state, the highest ranking ever for the boys' basketball program, which had been ranked 54th in 2023–24, 65th in 2022–23, 75th in 2019–20, and 54th in 2018–19.

== Rankings and recognition ==
Payne Tech has received recognition from school-ranking organizations. In 2026, Niche gave the school an overall grade of A− and an A− grade for diversity. Niche also gave the school an A for clubs and activities, an A− for teachers, a B for academics, a B for college preparation, and a B+ for sports. Niche ranked Payne Tech among its Standout High Schools in New Jersey and Essex County.

== Notable achievements ==
In 2025, Payne Tech senior Jaden Diaz received an Essex County Unsung Hero Award from the Essex County School Boards Association. Diaz was enrolled in the school's Game Design program and participated on the Payne Tech bowling team.

== In popular culture ==
In July 2026, Colombian singer Shakira used the school's gymnasium as a rehearsal space while preparing for her performance at the 2026 FIFA World Cup final at MetLife Stadium. Shakira shared a carousel of photographs and video from her preparations on Instagram, including footage of a dance rehearsal inside Payne Tech's gymnasium.

== Administration ==
The school's principal is Eric Love. His core administration team includes three vice principals.
