= List of schools in the Roman Catholic Diocese of Paterson =

List of schools in the Roman Catholic Diocese of Paterson

== 7-12 schools ==
Non-diocesan schools

- Delbarton School, Morristown (operated by the Benedictine monks of Saint Mary's Abbey)
- Villa Walsh Academy, Morristown (operated by the Religious Teachers Filippini)

== High schools ==
Diocesan High Schools

- DePaul Catholic High School, Wayne
- Morris Catholic High School, Denville
- Pope John XXIII Regional High School, Sparta

Non-diocesan Catholic high schools

- Academy of Saint Elizabeth, Convent Station (operated by the Sisters of Charity of Saint Elizabeth)
- Mary Help of Christians Academy, North Haledon (operated by the Salesian Sisters)

== Grade schools ==
Morris County Diocesan

- All Saints Academy (Parsippany)
- Assumption School (Morristown)
- Divine Mercy Academy (Rockaway)
- Holy Spirit School (Pequannock)
- Our Lady of Mt. Carmel School (Boonton)
- St. Patrick School (Chatham)
- St. Therese School (Succasunna)
- St. Vincent the Martyr School (Madison)

Passaic County Diocesan

- Academy of St. James of the Marches (Totowa) - It began operations in 1956 as Academy of Saint James. It had 192 students in 2019; that year St. Brendan School merged and the school received its current name.
- Immaculate Heart of Mary School (Wayne)
- St. Anthony School (Hawthorne)
- St. Gerard School (Paterson)
- St. Mary's School (Pompton Lakes) (closed 2020)
- St. Philip Preparatory School (Clifton)

Sussex County

- Pope John XXIII Middle School (grades 5-7) (Sparta)
- Rev. George A. Brown Memorial School (pre-Kindergarten through grade 4) (Sparta)

Non-diocesan Catholic schools

- St. Elizabeth School (Parsippany)
- St. Nicholas Ukrainian School (Passaic)

== Former schools ==
=== Former high schools ===
Former Diocesan High Schools

- Bayley-Ellard Catholic High School, Madison (closed after 2004–05 school year)
- Don Bosco Preparatory High School, Paterson
- Pope Pius XII High School, Passaic (closed at the end of the 1982-1983 academic year)
- Neumann Preparatory School, Wayne (closed at the end of the 1989-1990 academic year)
- Paul VI Regional High School, Clifton (closed at the end of the 1989-1990 academic year)
- Paterson Catholic High School, Paterson (closed at the end of the 2009-2010 academic year)

=== Former grade schools ===
Former diocesan grade schools

==== Morris County ====
Schools include:

- Holy Family School (Florham Park)
- Our Lady of the Magnificat (Kinnelon)
- Our Lady of Mercy School (Whippany)
- Sacred Heart School (Dover)
- Sacred Heart School (Rockaway)
- St. Anthony School (Butler)
- St. Christopher School (Parsippany)
- St. Cecilia School (Rockaway)
- St. Elizabeth School (Parsippany)
- St. Joseph School (Mendham) - In fall 2018 the school administration started a fundraising campaign to keep the school open. In April 2019 the school announced it was closing. The school was to have 75 students in fall 2019.
- St. Mary School (Denville)
- St. Mary School (Wharton)
- St. Michael School (Netcong)
- St. Peter School (Parsippany)
- St. Pius X School (Montville) - It closed in 2018.
- St. Rose of Lima Academy (East Hanover)
- St. Therese School (Succasunna)
- St. Vincent de Paul School (Stiriling)
- St. Virgil School (Morris Plains)

==== Passaic County ====
Schools include:

Clifton

- Pope John Paul II School
- Sacred Heart School
- St. Andrew the Apostle School - It opened circa 1953. It closed in 2018 as the number of students declined too much.
- St. Brendan School - Began operations in 1946. In 2019 it merged into Totowa's St. James School. It had 182 students in 2019.
- St. Clare School
- St. John Kanty School
- St. Paul School

Passaic

- Holy Trinity School
- Our Lady of Mount Carmel School - Closed in 2010.
- Passaic Catholic Regional School - Closed in 2008.
- St. Anthony School - Closed in 2011.
- St. Nicholas School
- St. Nicholas Ukrainian School

Paterson

- Blessed Sacrament School
- Our Lady of Lourdes School
- St. Anthony School
- St. George School
- St. Mary School
- St. Therese School

Wayne

- Our Lady of Consolation School
- Our Lady of the Valley School

Other municipalities

- St. Francis School (Haskell)
- Our Lady Queen of Peace School (Hewitt)
- Our Lady of the Holy Angels School (Little Falls)
- St. Paul School (Prospect Park)
- St. Catherine of Bologna School (Ringwood) - In the 2018-2019 school year the enrollment was 164. It was established in 1948. Up until July 2019 the school planned to recruit students to reach the benchmark of 112, but by July only 94 appeared, so the school was to close before September 2019. Nj.com stated that "Parents of students at St. Catherine of Bologna School had been aware that that school's future was in jeopardy". Nj.com wrote that this closure "drew more attention" than the two others that occurred in the diocese that year.
- St. Joseph School (West Milford)

==== Sussex County ====
Schools include:

- Immaculate Conception School (Franklin)
- Camp Auxilium School (Newton)
- St. Joseph School (Newton)
