= Schechter New York =

Schechter New York can refer to:

- Solomon Schechter School of Manhattan, a K-8 Jewish day school in Manhattan, New York City, United States
- Solomon Schechter High School of New York, United States, a co-educational Jewish high school which became Metro Schechter Academy

== See also ==
- Schechter v. New York (1935), decision by the Supreme Court of the United States
