= Joe Biscaha =

American football player (born 1937)

No. 80, 34
- Position: End

Personal information
- Born: June 1, 1937 (age 89); Clifton, New Jersey, U.S.
- Listed height: 6 ft 1 in (1.85 m)
- Listed weight: 190 lb (86 kg)

Career information
- High school: Pope Pius XII (NJ)
- College: Richmond
- NFL draft: 1959: 27th round, 323rd overall pick

Career history
- New York Giants (1959); Boston Patriots (1960); New York Titans (1961)*
- * Offseason or practice squad member only

Career NFL/AFL statistics
- Receptions: 1
- Receiving yards: 5
- Stats at Pro Football Reference

Joseph Daniel Biscaha (born June 1, 1937) is an American former professional football player who was an end in the National Football League (NFL) for the New York Giants in 1959 and in the American Football League (AFL) for the Boston Patriots in 1960. After signing with the New York Titans in 1961, he retired from professional football.

Biscaha played high school football at Pope Pius XII High School in Passaic, New Jersey. He played college football for the Richmond Spiders.

Following his career in professional football, he entered the field of education where he served as a teacher of Biology and football coach at Paterson Central, John F. Kennedy High School, Passaic Valley Regional High School, and Bloomfield High School. He also coached in the initial years for the Paterson Catholic High School program in football. His teaching/coaching career continued for 25 years and was highlighted by three New Jersey State Championship seasons, 1975,1979, and 1980, at Passaic Valley and numerous coaching honors. After an eight-year retirement from Education, while working in financial services, he returned to serve ten years as a School Administrator at Passaic County Technical Institute until his retirement in 2005.

Having graduated from the University of Richmond with a BS in biology, he later attained an MA in School Administration in 1966 from Seton Hall University.
