= Passaic County Vocational School District =

School district in Passaic County, New Jersey, US

Address
- 45 Reinhardt Road Wayne, Passaic County, New Jersey, 07470; United States
- Coordinates: 40.929997°N 74.204657°W

District information
- Grades: Vocational
- Superintendent: John Maiello
- Business administrator: Christine Kahwaty
- Schools: 2

Students and staff
- Enrollment: 4,543 (as of 2023–24)
- Faculty: 383.0 FTEs
- Student–teacher ratio: 11.9:1

Other information
- Website: pctvs.org
Ind.	Per pupil	District spending	Rank (*)	Vocational average	%± vs. average
1A	Total Spending	$25,003	17	$18,891	32.4%
1	Budgetary Cost	19,434	14	17,296	12.4%
2	Classroom Instruction	10,608	19	9,045	17.3%
6	Support Services	3,487	20	2,269	53.7%
8	Administrative Cost	1,908	7	2,353	−18.9%
10	Operations & Maintenance	2,705	9	3,014	−10.3%
13	Extracurricular Activities	681	16	464	46.8%
16	Median Teacher Salary	87,193	21	65,035
Data from NJDoE 2014 Taxpayers' Guide to Education Spending. *Of Vocational districts with any number of students. Lowest spending=1; Highest=21

The Passaic County Vocational School District is a comprehensive vocational public school district based in Wayne serving the vocational and training needs of high school students in ninth through twelfth grades and adults from Passaic County, in the U.S. state of New Jersey. It consists of two sister schools, Passaic County Technical Institute and the Diana C. Lobosco STEM Academy.

As of the 2023–24 school year, the district, comprised of two schools, had an enrollment of 4,543 students and 383.0 classroom teachers (on an FTE basis), for a student–teacher ratio of 11.9:1.

== School ==
Schools in the district (with 2023–24 enrollment data from the National Center for Education Statistics) are:

- Diana C. Lobosco STEM Academy is a four-year countywide vocational public high school focusing on Biomedical Life Sciences, Engineering, and Computer Science with 885 students in grades 9–12.
  - Joaquim Johnson, principal
- Passaic County Technical Institute (PCTI), a four-year countywide vocational public high school with 3,660 students in grades 9–12.
  - Antonio Garcia, principal

Both schools are located on a campus in Wayne.

== Administration ==
Core members of the district's administration are:

- John Maiello, superintendent
- Christine Kahwaty, business administrator and board secretary

== Board of education ==
The district's board of education is comprised of five members—the county superintendent of schools and four appointed members—who set policy and oversee the fiscal and educational operation of the district through its administration. As a Type I school district, the board's trustees are appointed by the members of the Passaic County Board of County Commissioners to serve four-year terms of office on a staggered basis, with one seat up for reappointment each year. The board appoints a superintendent to oversee the district's day-to-day operations and a business administrator to supervise the business functions of the district.
