= Garrett Morgan Academy =

High school in Passaic County, New Jersey, United States

Location
- 200 Grand Street; Paterson, Passaic County, New Jersey 07502; United States
- 40.9095°N 74.1798°W

Information
- Type: Public high school
- Established: 2000
- School district: Paterson Public Schools
- NCES School ID: 341269003370
- Principal: Dr. Catherine Forfia-Dion
- Faculty: NA FTEs
- Grades: 9-12
- Enrollment: 183 (as of 2020–21)
- Student to teacher ratio: NA
- Website: www.njcdc.org/garrettmorgan-academy

Garrett Morgan Academy is a four-year public high school in Paterson, Passaic County, New Jersey, United States, that serves students in ninth through twelfth grades operating as part of the Paterson Public Schools. The school focuses on STEM education and operates within International High School.

As of the 2020–21 school year, the school had an enrollment of 183 students. There were 94 students (51.4% of enrollment) eligible for free lunch.

== History ==
The school was established in 2000 by the school district and the New Jersey Community Development Corporation to focus on STEM education. Initially, the school began with 100 students and a focus on technology and transportation,

The school was named for Garrett Morgan, an African-American inventor who lived from 1877 to 1963 and invented a three-position traffic signal and a smoke hood.

== Administration ==
Core members of the school's administration are:

- Dr. Catherine Forfia-Dion, principal
