= Essex County Schools of Technology =

Technical school district in Essex County, New Jersey, US

Address
- 60 Nelson Place, 1 North Newark, Essex County, New Jersey, 07102; United States
- Coordinates: 40.834749°N 74.257244°W

District information
- Grades: Vocational
- Superintendent: James Pedersen
- Business administrator: Bernetta Davis
- Schools: 3

Students and staff
- Enrollment: 2,340 (as of 2020–21)
- Faculty: 181.0 FTEs
- Student–teacher ratio: 12.9:1

Other information
- District Factor Group: NA
- Website: www.essextech.org
Ind.	Per pupil	District spending	Rank (*)	Vocational average	%± vs. average
1A	Total Spending	$23,530	12	$18,891	24.6%
1	Budgetary Cost	17,583	13	17,296	1.7%
2	Classroom Instruction	8,917	11	9,045	−1.4%
6	Support Services	2,151	12	2,269	−5.2%
8	Administrative Cost	2,807	13	2,353	19.3%
10	Operations & Maintenance	3,150	13	3,014	4.5%
13	Extracurricular Activities	468	12	464	0.9%
16	Median Teacher Salary	65,120	15	65,035
Data from NJDoE 2014 Taxpayers' Guide to Education Spending. *Of Vocational districts with any number of students. Lowest spending=1; Highest=21

The Essex County Schools of Technology (formerly known as Essex County Vocational Technical Schools) is a regional public school district headquartered in Newark that offers occupational and academic instruction for public high school and adult students in Essex County, in the U.S. state of New Jersey. Founded in 1914, the district is one of the state's largest and oldest vocational education system.

As of the 2020–21 school year, the district, comprising three schools, had an enrollment of 2,340 students and 181.0 classroom teachers (on an FTE basis), for a student–teacher ratio of 12.9:1.

All high schools provide academic and occupational programs for ninth through twelfth grades, offering both full and shared time to both general education and special education students.

It has been announced by ECVTS the opening of the newly constructed Donald M. Payne Sr. School of Technology in Newark, NJ will be in September 2018. The newly built school will serve as the home of current students from Bloomfield Tech and North 13th Street as ECVTS will close both sites.

== Awards and recognition ==
During the 2009-10 school year, Bloomfield Tech High School was awarded the National Blue Ribbon School Award of Excellence by the United States Department of Education, the highest award an American school can receive.

During the 2012-13 academic year, West Caldwell Tech High School was recognized as a Blue Ribbon School Award of Excellence by the U.S. Department of Education, one of 17 schools in the state to receive the award that year.

In 2015, both Bloomfield Tech and Newark Tech were recognized with the National Blue Ribbon School Award of Excellence.

== Schools ==
The district consists of the following three high schools (with 2020–21 enrollment data from the National Center for Education Statistics), which are:

- Donald M. Payne Sr. School of Technology in Newark, with 1,291 students in grades 9-12
  - Eric Love, Principal
- Newark Tech High School in Newark, with 716 students in grades 9-12
  - Carmen Morales, Principal
- West Caldwell Tech in West Caldwell, with 336 students in grades 9-12
  - Ayisha Ingram-Robinson, Principal

The district offers adult programs in the evening at the Newark Tech and Donald M. Payne Tech centers.

=== Defunct schools ===
- Bloomfield Tech High School in Bloomfield (Closed)
- Irvington Tech in Irvington (Closed in 1989)
- North 13th Street Tech in Newark (Closed)

== Administration ==
Core members of the district's administration are:

- James Pedersen, superintendent of schools
- Bernetta Davis, business administrator / board secretary

== Board of education ==
The Board of Education is composed of seven members. The Board of Education is appointed by the Essex County Executive with the advice and consent of the Board of County Commissioners.
