= Hunterdon County Vocational School District =

School district in Hunterdon County, New Jersey, US

Address
- 8 Bartles Corner Road, Suite 2 Flemington, Hunterdon County, New Jersey, 08822
- Coordinates: 40.536278°N 74.855872°W

District information
- Grades: Vocational
- Superintendent: Todd Bonsall
- Business administrator: Ashley Sanguiliano
- Schools: 3

Students and staff
- Enrollment: 322 (as of 2022–23)
- Faculty: 23.0 FTEs
- Student–teacher ratio: 14.0:1

Other information
- Website: www.hcvsd.org
Ind.	Per pupil	District spending	Rank (*)	Vocational average	%± vs. average
1A	Total Spending	$10,945	2	$18,891	−42.1%
1	Budgetary Cost	21,096	19	17,296	22.0%
2	Classroom Instruction	9,759	15	9,045	7.9%
6	Support Services	2,542	15	2,269	12.0%
8	Administrative Cost	4,574	21	2,353	94.4%
10	Operations & Maintenance	4,437	19	3,014	47.2%
13	Extracurricular Activities	162	5	464	−65.1%
16	Median Teacher Salary	60,660	9	65,035
Data from NJDoE 2014 Taxpayers' Guide to Education Spending. *Of Vocational districts with any number of students. Lowest spending=1; Highest=21

The Hunterdon County Vocational School District is a technical and vocational public school district serving students in ninth through twelfth grades and adult learners, located in Raritan Township, and serving all of Hunterdon County, in the U.S. state of New Jersey.

Students attend the district's school on a half-day basis for specialized training in 11 core program areas, starting in their sophomore year. Most standard academic courses are taken at the student's home high school.

As of the 2022–23 school year, the district, comprising three schools, had an enrollment of 322 students and 23.0 classroom teachers (on an FTE basis), for a student–teacher ratio of 14.0:1.

== Schools ==
Schools in the district (with 2022–23 enrollment data from the National Center for Education Statistics) are: Hunterdon County Polytech Career Academy with 211 students in grades 9-12

- Bartles Corner Campus off Bartles Corner Road with 2 students in grades 9-12
- Central Campus next to the Hunterdon Central High School Field House with 50 students in grades 9-12

== Administration ==
Core members of the district's administration are:

- Todd Bonsall, superintendent
- Ashley Sanguiliano, business administrator

== Board of education ==
The district's board of education is comprised of the county superintendent of schools and six public members who set policy and oversee the fiscal and educational operation of the district through its administration. As a Type I school district, the board's trustees are appointed by the Hunterdon County Board of County Commissioners to serve four-year terms of office on a staggered basis, with either one or two members up for reappointment each year. The board appoints a superintendent to oversee the district's day-to-day operations and a business administrator to supervise the business functions of the district.
