= Carter Warren =

American football player (born 1999)

Columbus Aviators
- Position: Offensive tackle
- Roster status: Unsigned draft pick

Personal information
- Born: January 19, 1999 (age 27); Paterson, New Jersey, U.S.
- Listed height: 6 ft 5 in (1.96 m)
- Listed weight: 311 lb (141 kg)

Career information
- High school: Passaic Tech (Wayne, New Jersey)
- College: Pittsburgh (2017–2022)
- NFL draft: 2023: 4th round, 120th overall pick

Career history
- New York Jets (2023–2024); Atlanta Falcons (2025)*; Miami Dolphins (2026)*; Columbus Aviators (2027-present)
- * Offseason or practice squad member only

Awards and highlights
- Second-team All-ACC (2021)

Career NFL statistics as of 2024
- Games played: 14
- Games started: 6
- Stats at Pro Football Reference

Carter Saint Warren (born January 19, 1999) is an American professional football offensive tackle. He played college football for the Pittsburgh Panthers.

== Early life ==
Warren grew up in Paterson, New Jersey and attended Passaic County Technical Institute. He was rated a four-star recruit and committed to play college football at Pittsburgh over offers from Rutgers, North Carolina, Penn State, Michigan, Kentucky, Michigan State, and Illinois.

== College career ==
Warren redshirted his true freshman season at Pitt and did not appear in any games as a redshirt freshman. He was named second-team All-Atlantic Coast Conference as a redshirt junior. Warren's redshirt senior season ended after suffering an undisclosed injury in Pittsburgh's fourth game of the year.

== Professional career ==
Pre-draft measurables
Height	Weight	Arm length	Hand span	Wingspan
6 ft 5 1/2 in (1.97 m)	311 lb (141 kg)	35 3/8 in (0.90 m)	9 1/8 in (0.23 m)	7 ft 0 1/2 in (2.15 m)
All values from NFL Combine

=== New York Jets ===
Warren was selected in the fourth round, 120th overall, of the 2023 NFL draft by the New York Jets. He was placed on injured reserve on August 30, 2023. He was activated on October 14.

On August 26, 2025, Warren was waived by the Jets as part of final roster cuts.

=== Atlanta Falcons ===
On August 28, 2025, Warren was signed to the Atlanta Falcons' practice squad.

=== Miami Dolphins ===
On January 9, 2026, Carter signed a reserve/futures contract with the Miami Dolphins. He was waived/injured on June 15. On September 3, Warren was waived by the Dolphins with an injury settlement.
