= Passaic City School District =

School district in Passaic County, New Jersey, US

Address
- 101 Passaic Avenue Passaic, Passaic County, New Jersey, 07055; United States
- Coordinates: 40.856981°N 74.128364°W

District information
- Grades: PreK to 12
- Superintendent: Sandra Montañez-Diodonet
- Business administrator: R. Aaron Bowman
- Schools: 17
- Affiliation: Former Abbott district

Students and staff
- Enrollment: 14,504 (as of 2018–19)
- Faculty: 839.8 FTEs
- Student–teacher ratio: 17.3:1

Other information
- District Factor Group: A
- Website: www.passaicschools.org
| Ind. | Per pupil | District spending | Rank (*) | K-12 average | %± vs. average |
|---|---|---|---|---|---|
| 1A | Total Spending | $23,212 | 94 | $18,891 | 22.9% |
| 1 | Budgetary Cost | 16,944 | 89 | 14,783 | 14.6% |
| 2 | Classroom Instruction | 9,934 | 89 | 8,763 | 13.4% |
| 6 | Support Services | 3,572 | 100 | 2,392 | 49.3% |
| 8 | Administrative Cost | 1,368 | 36 | 1,485 | −7.9% |
| 10 | Operations & Maintenance | 1,742 | 61 | 1,783 | −2.3% |
| 13 | Extracurricular Activities | 100 | 2 | 268 | −62.7% |
| 16 | Median Teacher Salary | 67,423 | 67 | 64,043 |
Data from NJDoE 2014 Taxpayers' Guide to Education Spending. *Of K-12 districts with more than 3,500 students. Lowest spending=1; Highest=103

Passaic City School District is a comprehensive community public school district located in Passaic, in the U.S. state of New Jersey, serving students in pre-kindergarten through twelfth grade. The district is one of 31 former Abbott districts statewide that were established pursuant to the decision by the New Jersey Supreme Court in Abbott v. Burke which are now referred to as "SDA Districts" based on the requirement for the state to cover all costs for school building and renovation projects in these districts under the supervision of the New Jersey Schools Development Authority.

As of the 2018–19 school year, the district, comprised of 17 schools, had an enrollment of 14,504 students and 839.8 classroom teachers (on an FTE basis), for a student–teacher ratio of 17.3:1.

The district is classified by the New Jersey Department of Education as being in District Factor Group "A", the lowest of eight groupings. District Factor Groups organize districts statewide to allow comparison by common socioeconomic characteristics of the local districts. From lowest socioeconomic status to highest, the categories are A, B, CD, DE, FG, GH, I and J.

== Schools ==
Schools in the district (with 2018–19 enrollment data from the National Center for Education Statistics) are:

Preschools

- Vincent Capuana School No. 15 (277; PreK)
  - Janet Drago, principal
- Sallie D. Gamble School No. 16 (465; PreK)
  - Terrence Love, principal

Elementary schools

- Thomas Jefferson School No. 1 (788; K-8)
  - Karen Fragale, principal
- George Washington School No. 2 (172; K-1)
- Mario J. Drago School No. 3 (formerly Franklin School) (803; PreK-8)
  - Diana Kattak, principal
- Benito Juárez School No. 5 (472; K-8)
  - Steven Cruz, principal
- Martin Luther King Jr. School No. 6 (1,124; PreK-8)
  - Stacey Bruce, principal
- Ulysses S. Grant School No. 7 (391; PreK-1)
  - Gulamhussein Janoowalla, principal
- Casimir Pulaski School No. 8 (%32; PreK-8)
  - Emmanuel Morales, principal
- Etta Gero School No. 9 (690; 2-8)
  - Leandra Ragone, principal
- Theodore Roosevelt School No. 10 (905; PreK-8)
  - Luis Colon, principal
- William B. Cruise Veterans Memorial School No. 11 (1,253; K-8)
  - Manuel Negron, principal
- Daniel F. Ryan School No. 19 (874; PreK/2-8)
  - Fawzi Naji, principal
- Passaic Gifted and Talented Academy School No. 20 (959; 2-8)
  - John Mellody, principal
- Sonia Sotomayor School No. 21 (; PreK-5)
  - Tiffany Allen, principal

Middle / high school

Passaic Technical Institute

- Passaic Academy for Science and Engineering (702; 6-11)
  - Ningel Bhuta, principal
- Passaic Preparatory Academy (701; 6-11)
  - Jason Marx, principal

High school

- Passaic High School (2,618; 9-12)
  - Jeannette Torres, principal

== Administration ==
Core members of the district's administration are:

- Sandra Montañez-Diodonet, superintendent
- R. Aaron Bowman, business administrator and board secretary

== Board of education ==
The district's board of education, comprised of nine members, sets policy and oversees the fiscal and educational operation of the district through its administration. As a Type II school district, the board's trustees are elected directly by voters to serve three-year terms of office on a staggered basis, with three seats up for election each year held as part of the April school election. The board appoints a superintendent to oversee the district's day-to-day operations and a business administrator to supervise the business functions of the district. Of the nearly 600 school districts statewide, Passaic is one of 12 districts with school elections in April, in which voters also decide on passage of the annual school budget.
