= Jim Lampley (basketball) =

American basketball player

Personal information
- Born: July 2, 1960 (age 65) Harrisburg, Pennsylvania, U.S.
- Died: November 22, 2025 Memphis, Tennessee, U.S.
- Listed height: 6 ft 10 in (2.08 m)
- Listed weight: 230 lb (104 kg)

Career information
- High school: Passaic County Technical Institute (Wayne, New Jersey)
- College: Vanderbilt (1978–1980); Little Rock (1981–1983)
- NBA draft: 1983: 5th round, 102nd overall pick
- Drafted by: Dallas Mavericks
- Playing career: 1983–1992
- Position: Center
- Number: 11, 52, 50

Career history
- 1983–1984: Detroit Spirits
- 1985–1986: Baltimore/Rockford Lightning
- 1986: Philadelphia 76ers
- 1986–1989: Rockford Lightning
- 1989–1990: Sioux Falls Skyforce
- 1990: Quad City Thunder
- 1990–1991: Tulsa Fast Breakers
- 1991: Pensacola Tornados
- 1991–1992: Columbus Horizon

Career highlights
- All-CBA First Team (1989); 2× CBA All-Star (1997, 1989); TAAC Newcomer of the Year (1982); First-team All-TAAC (1982)
- Stats at NBA.com
- Stats at Basketball Reference

Jimmy D. Lampley (born July 2, 1960 - November 22, 2025) is an American former professional basketball player who was a center for one season in the National Basketball Association (NBA) as a member of the Philadelphia 76ers during the 1986–87 season. Born in Harrisburg, Pennsylvania, he attended Vanderbilt University and the University of Arkansas at Little Rock where he was drafted in the fifth round of the 1983 NBA draft by the Dallas Mavericks who waived him before the start of the season. Lampley signed with three teams who he never appeared in a game for: the Dallas Mavericks, the Washington Bullets and the Milwaukee Bucks.

Raised in Paterson, New Jersey, Lampley played prep basketball at Passaic County Technical Institute in Wayne, New Jersey and collegiately for the Vanderbilt Commodores and the Little Rock Trojans.

While his NBA career was brief, he had a longer career in the Continental Basketball Association (CBA). He played 314 games over eight seasons and for seven teams. Averaging 13.8 points and 8.9 rebounds, he was named to the all-league team for the 1988–89 season and appeared in two All-Star games.

== Career statistics ==
Legend
GP	Games played	GS	Games started	MPG	Minutes per game
FG%	Field goal percentage	3P%	3-point field goal percentage	FT%	Free throw percentage
RPG	Rebounds per game	APG	Assists per game	SPG	Steals per game
BPG	Blocks per game	PPG	Points per game	**Bold**	Career high

=== NBA ===
==== Regular season ====
Year	Team	GP	GS	MPG	FG%	3P%	FT%	RPG	APG	SPG	BPG	PPG
1986–87	Philadelphia	1	0	16.0	.333	–	.500	5.0	.0	1.0	.0	3.0
