= Trenton Central High School West =

Trenton Central High School West Campus
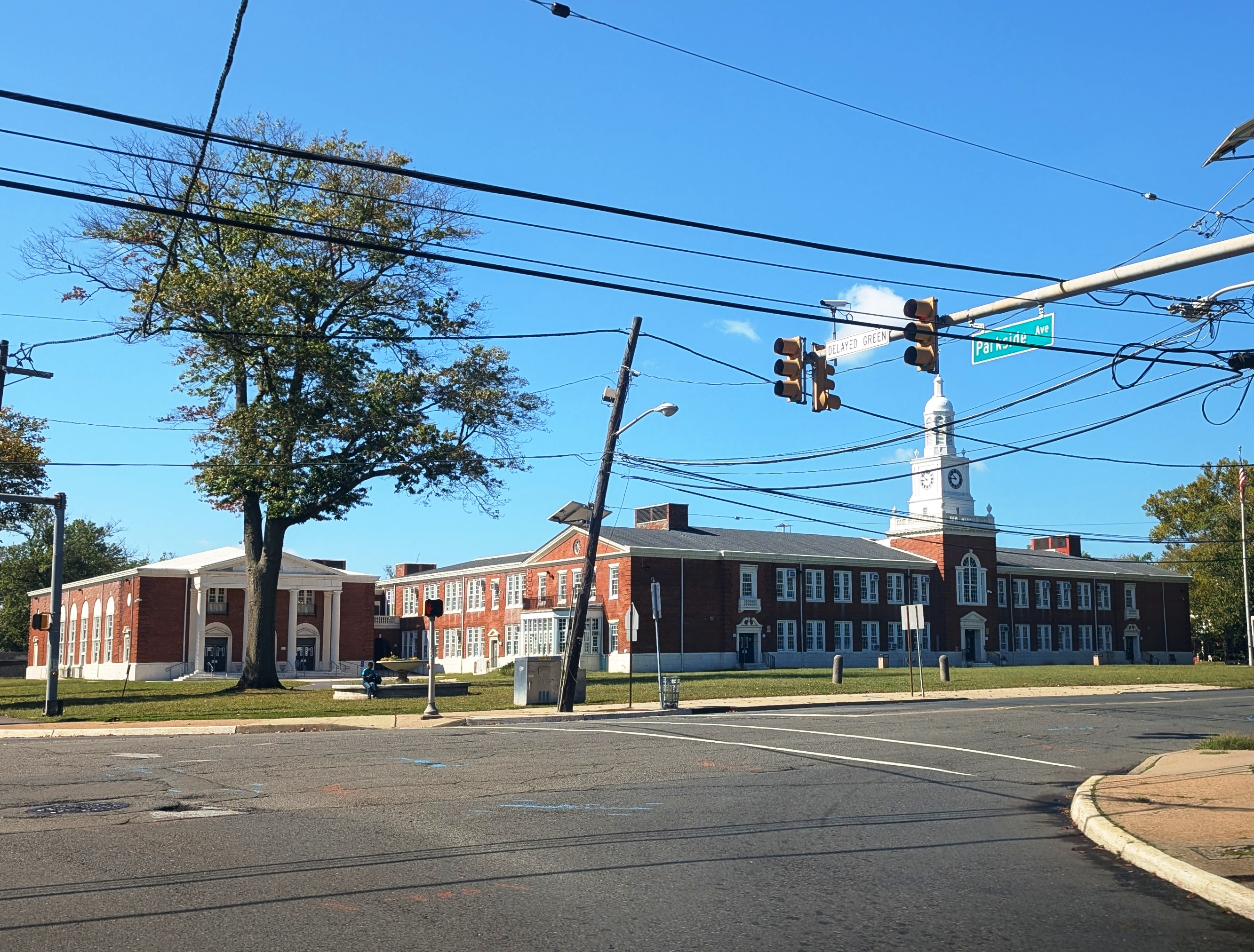
- School building in Sept. 2025 as Arthur J. Holland Middle School

Location
- 1001 West State Street; Trenton, NJ 08618; United States
- Coordinates: 40.2320°N 74.7925°W

Information
- Type: Public high school
- School district: Trenton Public Schools
- Principal: Mark Hoppe
- Faculty: 64.1 FTEs
- Grades: 9-12
- Enrollment: 679 (as of 2015-16)
- Student to teacher ratio: 10.6:1
- Website: School website

Trenton Central High School West was a four-year comprehensive public high school that serves students in ninth through twelfth grades from Trenton, in Mercer County, New Jersey, United States, operating as part of the Trenton Public Schools.

As of the 2015-16 school year, the school had an enrollment of 679 students and 64.1 classroom teachers (on an FTE basis), for a student–teacher ratio of 10.6:1. There were 524 students (77.2% of enrollment) eligible for free lunch and 45 (6.6% of students) eligible for reduced-cost lunch. The school has a chronic absence rate of 48.0% as of the 2015-16 school year.

The school building is no longer a high school as it is now the Arthur J. Holland Middle School.

== Awards, recognition and rankings ==
In 2014, the high school was the 302nd-ranked public high school in New Jersey out of 339 schools statewide in New Jersey Monthly magazine's September 2014 cover story on the state's "Top Public High Schools", using a new ranking methodology.
