= New Jersey United Christian Academy =

Private school in Monmouth County, New Jersey, United States

Location
- 73 Holmes Mill Road; Cream Ridge, New Jersey, (Monmouth County) 08514; United States
- 40.1119°N 74.5364°W

Information
- Type: Private
- Established: September 2003
- NCES School ID: A0502322
- Faculty: 10.8 FTEs
- Grades: 6–12
- Enrollment: 66 (as of 2021–22)
- Student to teacher ratio: 6.1:1
- Campus size: 43 acres (170,000 m^{2})
- Athletics conference: Penn-Jersey Athletic Association
- Tuition: $6,930 (6-8); $5,500 (9-11); $7,535 (grade 12); (for 2017-2018)
- Website: www.njuca.org

New Jersey United Christian Academy is a private Christian middle and high school serving students in sixth through twelfth grades, located in the Cream Ridge section of Upper Freehold Township, in Monmouth County, in the U.S. state of New Jersey. New Jersey United Christian Academy (NJUCA) is ranked by Niche as the #3 Best Private High School in Monmouth County.

As of the 2021–22 school year, the school had an enrollment of 66 students and 10.8 classroom teachers (on an FTE basis), for a student–teacher ratio of 6.1:1. The school's student body was 69.7% (46) White, 19.7% (13) Asian, 7.6% (5) Hispanic and 3.0% (2) Black.

== Athletics ==
The school competes in interscholastic sports as part of the Penn-Jersey Athletic Association. Athletic programs offered to students include Volleyball, Cross-country, Basketball and Track for girls; and Cross-country, Basketball and Track for boys.
