= Trenton Public Schools =

School district in Mercer County, New Jersey, US

Address
- 108 North Clinton Avenue Trenton, Mercer County, New Jersey, 08609; United States
- Coordinates: 40.22413°N 74.753788°W

District information
- Grades: PreK-12
- Superintendent: James Earle
- Business administrator: Jayne S. Howard
- Schools: 25
- Affiliation: Former Abbott district

Students and staff
- Enrollment: 15,459 (as of 2023–24)
- Faculty: 976.4 FTEs
- Student–teacher ratio: 15.8:1

Other information
- District Factor Group: A
- Website: www.trentonk12.org
Ind.	Per pupil	District spending	Rank (*)	K-12 average	%± vs. average
1A	Total Spending	$21,156	86	$18,891	12.0%
1	Budgetary Cost	17,145	92	14,783	16.0%
2	Classroom Instruction	10,094	91	8,763	15.2%
6	Support Services	2,691	80	2,392	12.5%
8	Administrative Cost	1,800	96	1,485	21.2%
10	Operations & Maintenance	2,191	89	1,783	22.9%
13	Extracurricular Activities	189	26	268	−29.5%
16	Median Teacher Salary	66,450	61	64,043
Data from NJDoE 2014 Taxpayers' Guide to Education Spending. *Of K-12 districts with more than 3,500 students. Lowest spending=1; Highest=103

The Trenton Public Schools is a community public school district, serving students in pre-kindergarten through twelfth grade from Trenton, in Mercer County, in the U.S. state of New Jersey. The district is one of 31 former Abbott districts statewide that were established pursuant to the decision by the New Jersey Supreme Court in Abbott v. Burke which are now referred to as "SDA Districts" based on the requirement for the state to cover all costs for school building and renovation projects in these districts under the supervision of the New Jersey Schools Development Authority.

As of the 2023–24 school year, the district, comprised of 25 schools, had an enrollment of 15,459 students and 976.4 classroom teachers (on an FTE basis), for a student–teacher ratio of 15.8:1. The district was the sixth-largest in the state in 2025.

== History ==
In the 1944 case Hedgepeth and Williams v. Board of Education, where two Black students were not permitted to attend their nearest junior high school that was only open to white students, the New Jersey Supreme Court ruled that racial segregation was outlawed by the New Jersey State Constitution and that it was unlawful for schools to segregate or refuse admission to students on the basis of race.

The district had been classified by the New Jersey Department of Education as being in District Factor Group "A", the lowest of eight groupings. District Factor Groups organize districts statewide to allow comparison by common socioeconomic characteristics of the local districts. From lowest socioeconomic status to highest, the categories are A, B, CD, DE, FG, GH, I and J.

== Awards and recognition ==
Washington Elementary School was recognized by Governor Jim McGreevey in 2003 as one of 25 schools selected statewide for the First Annual Governor's School of Excellence award.

== Schools ==
Schools in the district (with 2023–24 enrollment data from the National Center for Education Statistics) are:

Preschool

- Early Childhood Learning Center (PreK)

Elementary schools

- Cadwalader Elementary School (185; K–3)
- Dr. Crosby Copeland Elementary School (with 309 students; in grades K–3; formerly Columbus Elementary School)
- Benjamin Franklin Elementary School (410; K–3)
- Benjamin C. Gregory Elementary School (295; K–3)
- William Harrison Elementary School (251; K–3)
- Patton J. Hill Elementary School (542; K–3)
- Darlene C. McKnight Elementary School (341; K–3; formerly Wilson Elementary School)
- Gershom Mott Elementary School (366; K–3)
- Luis Muñoz-Rivera Elementary School (456; K–3)
- Carroll Robbins Elementary School (460; K–3)
- Paul Robeson Elementary School (367; K–3)
- Joseph Stokes Elementary School (344; K–3)
- George Washington Elementary School (316; K–3)

Intermediate schools

- Ulysses S. Grant Intermediate School (572; 4–6)
- Hedgepeth-Williams Intermediate School (639; 4–6)
- Thomas Jefferson Intermediate School (342; 4–6)
- Joyce Kilmer Intermediate School (530; 4–6)
- Battle Monument Intermediate School (490; 4–6)
- Clara Parker Intermediate School (565; 4–6)

Middle schools

- Grace A. Dunn Middle School (681; 7–8)
- Dr. Martin Luther King Jr. Middle School (610; 7–8)
- Arthur J. Holland Middle School (445; 7–8)

High schools

- Trenton's Ninth Grade Academy (837; 9)
- Capital City High School (617; 9–12)
- Trenton Central High School (2,138; 10–12)

== Administration ==
Core members of the district's administration are:

- James Earle, superintendent of schools
- Jayne S. Howard, business administrator and board secretary

== Board of education ==
The district's board of education is comprised of nine members who set policy and oversee the fiscal and educational operation of the district through its administration. As a Type II school district, the board's trustees are elected directly by voters to serve three-year terms of office on a staggered basis, with three seats up for election each year held (since 2023) as part of the April school election. The board appoints a superintendent to oversee the district's day-to-day operations and a business administrator to supervise the business functions of the district.

The Trenton Public Schools had been a Type I school district, a system under which the board's seven trustees were appointed by the mayor to serve three-year terms of office on a staggered basis, with either two or three members up for reappointment each year. Of the more than 600 school districts statewide, Trenton was one of about a dozen districts with appointed school boards. This was the case until the passage of a November 2022 referendum, which changed the district to a Type II district with nine elected members.
