= Newark School of Data Science and Information Technology =

Vocational high school in Newark, New Jersey, United States

Location
- 746 Sanford Avenue; Newark, Essex County, New Jersey 07106; United States; 40.7366°N 74.2364°W

Information
- Type: Public high school
- Established: September 2021
- School district: Newark Public Schools
- NCES School ID: 341134003529
- Principal: Liana M. Summey
- Faculty: 30.0 FTEs
- Grades: 9-12
- Enrollment: 414 (as of 2024–25)
- Student to teacher ratio: 13.8:1
- Website: www.nps.k12.nj.us/data-science/

Newark School of Data Science and Information Technology is a four-year magnet community public high school in Newark, in Essex County, in the U.S. state of New Jersey, serving students in ninth through twelfth grades, and operating as part of the Newark Public Schools. The school focuses on data science and information technology.

The school opened for the 2021–22 school year with a freshman class and plans to add a new grade each subsequent year. With a focus on computer science and technology, the school worked with Microsoft as a partner in technology and with the United States Drug Enforcement Agency to educate students in cybersecurity and law enforcement.

As of the 2024–25 school year, the school had an enrollment of 414 students and 30.0 classroom teachers (on an FTE basis), for a student–teacher ratio of 13.8:1. There were 289 students (69.8% of enrollment) eligible for free lunch and 40 (9.7% of students) eligible for reduced-cost lunch.

== Administration ==
The school's principal is Liana M. Summey. Her core administration team includes the vice principal.
