= West Caldwell Tech =

High School in Essex County, New Jersey, US

Location
- 620 Passaic Avenue; West Caldwell, Essex County, New Jersey 07006; United States
- Coordinates: 40.8531°N 74.2926°W

Information
- Type: Vocational Public high school
- School district: Essex County Vocational Technical Schools
- NCES School ID: 340480002080
- Principal: Ayisha Ingram-Robinson
- Faculty: 37.0 FTEs
- Grades: 9-12
- Enrollment: 349 (as of 2023–24)
- Student to teacher ratio: 9.4:1
- Colors: Red; White and Blue
- Athletics conference: Independent
- Team name: Eagles
- Website: www.essextech.org/o/ecwc

West Caldwell Tech is a regional public high school located in West Caldwell, that offers occupational and academic instruction for students in ninth through twelfth grades in Essex County, in the U.S. state of New Jersey, operating as part of the Essex County Vocational Technical Schools.

As of the 2023–24 school year, the school had an enrollment of 349 students and 37.0 classroom teachers (on an FTE basis), for a student–teacher ratio of 9.4:1. There were 205 students (58.7% of enrollment) eligible for free lunch and 57 (16.3% of students) eligible for reduced-cost lunch.

The students and staff of West Caldwell Tech used the former Bloomfield Tech High School facility while the West Caldwell school building was being renovated as part of a $30 million project. Officials celebrated the official reopening of the renovated West Caldwell Tech with a ribbon-cutting ceremony in October 2021.

== Awards, recognition and rankings ==
West Caldwell Tech was named a 2012 National Blue Ribbon School by the United States Department of Education, one of 17 schools in the state of New Jersey and 269 school nationwide to receive the designation. The Department of Education awards the National Blue Ribbon to public and private elementary, middle and high schools for being high performing schools or to schools that show significant improvement in the students' level of achievement. West Caldwell Tech received the designation for being an "Exemplary Improving School."

Schooldigger.com ranked the school as 307th out of 389 public high schools statewide in its 2012 rankings (an increase of 8 positions from the previous ranking) which were based on the combined percentage of students classified as proficient or above proficient on the language arts literacy (64.7%) and mathematics (88.2%) components of the High School Proficiency Assessment (HSPA).

== Athletics ==
The West Caldwell Tech Eagles compete as an independent school with no conference affiliation, under the jurisdiction of the New Jersey State Interscholastic Athletic Association (NJSIAA). With 248 students in grades 10-12, the school was classified by the NJSIAA for the 2019–20 school year as Group I for most athletic competition purposes, which included schools with an enrollment of 75 to 476 students in that grade range.

== Administration ==
The principal is Ayisha Ingram-Robinson.
