= Passaic Academy for Science and Engineering =

High school in Passaic County, New Jersey, US

Location
- 291 Lafayette Avenue; Passaic, Passaic County, New Jersey 07055; United States
- 40.857024°N 74.132412°W

Information
- Type: Public high school
- School district: Passaic City School District
- NCES School ID: 341254003433
- Principal: Ningel Bhuta
- Faculty: 53.5 FTEs
- Grades: 6-12
- Enrollment: 694 (as of 2023–24)
- Student to teacher ratio: 13.0:1
- Website: passaicschools.org/science/

The Passaic Academy for Science and Engineering is a seven-year public magnet middle / high school in Passaic in Passaic County, in the U.S. state of New Jersey, operated as part of the Passaic City School District and serving students in sixth through twelfth grades offered by the school district.

As of the 2023–24 school year, the school had an enrollment of 694 students and 53.5 classroom teachers (on an FTE basis), for a student–teacher ratio of 13.0:1. There were 694 students (100.0% of enrollment) eligible for free lunch and none eligible for reduced-cost lunch.

== Administration ==
The school's principal is Ningel Bhuta. The core administration team includes two assistant principals.
