= Metro Schechter Academy =

Former college preparatory school in New Jersey

Coordinates: 40.885672°N 74.009242°W

Information
- Established: 2006
- Closed: 2007

Metropolitan Schechter High School was a Conservative Jewish coeducational college preparatory school in Teaneck, New Jersey, USA, that was the result of the combination of the Solomon Schechter High School of New York in Manhattan and the Schechter Regional High School in Teaneck. It started in fall 2006, had its first graduating class in the spring 2007, and never re-opened after summer 2007.

In early May 2007, parents were informed that there was the possibility that the school would cease operations and not re-open for the 2007–2008 school year. For those students who came from Solomon Schechter High School of New York, this would have meant two years in a row of switching schools, with the closure once again announced at the end of the school year.

A meeting was held on the evening of May 7, 2007, with parents and board members. It was announced that only 9 students had enrolled for the upcoming entering class, and that the school needed an additional $1.5 million in order to get through the coming school year. The board promised the parents that they would allow the school to stay open if ten students enrolled in the incoming 2007 freshman class by May 11, 2007, and $500,000 was raised by September 1, 2007. In late August, the school board announced that a long-time major donor had backed out from a pledge because of "personal financial losses" and the school was closed.

== Curriculum ==
The school's core curriculum focused on English, history, math, science, Hebrew, Tanakh (Bible), and Talmud. In addition, students studied a foreign language (French or Spanish), the arts and physical education. A high priority was placed on scientific inquiry, on integrating Jewish and general studies, and on promoting Hebrew both as a living language and as a portal to advanced Jewish study. The core curriculum was complemented by a variety of elective courses in the arts and sciences.

== Closing ==
In late August 2007, the board of trustees of Metropolitan Schechter High School called a meeting to announce that a donor had had some significant financial trouble and they no longer had the proper funds to keep the school running. Students who had been planning to attend the school were forced to find other schools a few days before the 2007–2008 school year began.
