= Al-Ghazaly High School =

Islamic high school in Passaic County, New Jersey, US

Al-Ghazaly Junior/Senior High School

Location
- 369 Passaic Avenue; Fairfield, (Essex County), NJ 07471; United States; 40.973197°N 74.272435°W

Information
- Type: Private, Coeducational
- Motto: Never Give Up
- Religious affiliation: Muslim religion
- Established: 1984
- Oversight: Islamic Education Foundation of New Jersey
- School code: 310594
- NCES School ID: A0502296
- Faculty: 39.8 FTEs
- Grades: 7–12
- Enrollment: 316 (as of 2023–24)
- Average class size: 30
- Student to teacher ratio: 7.9:1
- Classes offered: AP Biology, AP Physics B, AP Calculus (AB and BC), AP Chemistry, AP English Literature, AP World History, AP US History, AP Environmental Science
- Newspaper: SNAP
- School fees: $399
- Tuition: $6,590-$8,290 (for 2025–26)
- Website: www.iefschools.org/al-ghazaly

Al-Ghazaly High School in Fairfield, in Essex County, New Jersey, is one of the oldest Islamic high schools in the United States. The school was founded in 1984, and serves students in seventh through twelfth grades. The Executive Director is Hayat Jaludi. Most students at Al-Ghazaly High School come from Al Hikmah Elementary School, located at North 8th Street in Prospect Park.

As of the 2023–24 school year, the school had an enrollment of 316 students and 39.8 classroom teachers (on an FTE basis), for a student–teacher ratio of 7.9:1. The school's student body was 63.9% (202) White, 31.6% (100) Asian, 3.2% (100) Hispanic and 1.3% (4) Black.

Al-Ghazaly's dress code has remained the same for many years to in order to show equality between students. Boys wear navy blue pants and white polo shirts while girls wear long navy blue Islamic dresses often referred to as "abaya" and red/maroon headscarves often referred to as "jilbab".

== History ==
Between 1984 and 2013, Al-Ghazaly was located on 441 North Street in Teaneck, New Jersey. The new facility in Wayne (formerly Neumann Preparatory School and Lake View Learning Center) opened its doors to students in September 2013, with the Teaneck facility repurposed to serve students in pre-Kindergarten through third grade.

The school relocated from Wayne, New Jersey, to Fairfield Township, Essex County, New Jersey, in a new campus that will open for the 2026–27 school year.

At an October 2026 hearing of the township's planning board, the school's executive director told the board that the school was operating with 313 students, well in excess of the 90 student maximum set in a certificate for re-occupancy issued by Fairfield Township to the school.

== Curriculum ==
The students at Al-Ghazaly study standard subjects, such as math (from algebra to calculus), English, science, history. Additionally, the school includes Arabic, Quran (memorization of the holy book), tafsir (analyzing/finding deep meaning to Quran), and Islamic studies as part of the curriculum. In Islamic studies, the students learn the morals and teachings of Islam, Sunna and shariah.

The students pray Zuhr together every day, and on Fridays, they have a Khateeb (imam) preach to them, after which they pray Jumu'ah.

== Extracurricular activities ==
Al Ghazaly offers Forensics, Model UN, Beta Club, Art Club, Mock Trial, Model Congress, Science Olympiad, Math League, and many other extracurriculars. Students partake in random acts of kindness. Ghazaly's basketball team is the Ghazaly Warriors.

With the opening of the new school building, new sports team are being founded by the students, including a boys and girls soccer team and a flag football team.
