= Parsippany Christian School =

Defunct Christian school in Middlesex County, New Jersey, US

Location
- 1179 Littleton Road; Parsippany-Troy Hills, Morris County, New Jersey 07950; United States
- 40.85810°N 74.45148°W

Information
- Type: Private school
- Established: 1970
- NCES School ID: 00869444
- Administrator: David M. Detwiler II
- Faculty: 14.3 FTEs
- Grades: PreK-12
- Enrollment: 109 (plus 4 in PreK, as of 2017–18)
- Student to teacher ratio: 7.6:1
- Colors: Red and White
- Nickname: Patriots
- Tuition: $6,430 (grades 9-12 for 2017-18)
- Website: www.pcspatriots.org

Parsippany Christian School (PCS) was a private Christian school in Parsippany, in the U.S. state of New Jersey. Parsippany Christian School was founded in 1970. Parsippany Christian School consists of pre-kindergarten though twelfth grades. The purpose of the school is to provide a sound academic education integrated with a Christian view of God and the world. Social activities, athletics, and discipline procedures are also governed by biblical principles. The school is a member of American Association of Christian Schools (AACS) and the Garden State Association of Christian Schools. The school closed in 2019.

As of the 2017–18 school year, the school had an enrollment of 109 students (plus 4 in PreK) and 14.3 classroom teachers (on an FTE basis), for a student–teacher ratio of 7.6:1. The school's student body was 35.8% (39) White, 33.0% (36) Black, 19.3% (21) Hispanic, 8.3% (9) Asian and 3.7% (4) two or more races.

== Athletics ==
Parsippany Christian School offered basketball, soccer, and volleyball.

== Academics ==
PCS used three different sources in their teaching: Bob Jones Press, A Beka Book, and Saxon Math.

Starting in middle school, electives offered to the students these include art, band, chess, choir, and computer. The high school electives included American Christian Honor Society, art, band, Bible quizzing, chess, chemistry, choir and yearbook.
