= Pope Pius XII High School =

Former school in Passaic, New Jersey

Pope Pius XII High School was a Roman Catholic high school serving students in ninth through twelfth grades located in Passaic, in Passaic County, New Jersey, United States, that had been operated by the Roman Catholic Diocese of Paterson from 1939 until it closed in 1983.

The school opened to students in September 1939. A 1957 expansion project brought the school's capacity up to 1,100 students. In the facing of declining enrollment that had fallen under 300 and rising financial deficits that could not be covered by fundraising, the Paterson diocese announced in February 1983 that the school would be closed at the end of the 1982-83 school year. Existing students would be shifted to Paterson Catholic High School and Paul VI High School.

== Athletics ==
The boys' bowling team won the overall state championship in 1962.

== Notable alumni ==
- Joe Biscaha (born 1937), American football offensive end who played in the National Football League for the New York Giants and in the American Football League for the Boston Patriots
- Henry McNamara (1934–2018), politician who represented the 40th Legislative District in the New Jersey Senate from 1985 to 2008
- Loretta Swit (1937–2025, class of 1955), stage and television actress, best known for appearing on M*A*S*H
