= Solomon Schechter High School of New York =

Coordinates: 40.78849°N 73.96705°W

Location
- 1 W 91st St. New York, NY 10025; United States

Information
- Funding type: Private
- Religious affiliation: Jewish
- Denomination: Conservative
- Founded: 1992
- Status: Closed
- Closed: 2006
- Grades: 9–12
- Campus type: Urban
- Color: Maroon
- Team name: Shockers
- Newspaper: Schechter Shemesh
- Affiliation: Jewish Theological Seminary of America

Solomon Schechter High School of New York was a coeducational Jewish high school located in the New York City borough of Manhattan. The school, which was affiliated with the Conservative Movement of Judaism and a member of the Solomon Schechter Day School Association, merged in 2006 with the New Jersey–based Schechter Regional High School, to form the Metro Schechter Academy, which in turn closed permanently in 2007.

SSHSNY was a laboratory school of the Jewish Theological Seminary, and provided students with a dual general and Judaic studies curriculum.

== History ==
In 1974, two seniors from Solomon Schechter High School were expelled after their involvement in what was called "the biggest cheating scandal to touch New York's Regents exams...since they were introduced in 1878)." They confessed to having broken into the principal's office, stolen the key to the strongbox, and photocopied the answers, which were sold with the help of two college students at $50 a piece.

== Curriculum ==
The school's core curriculum included studies in English, history, math, science, Hebrew, Tanakh (Bible), and Talmud. In addition, students learned a foreign language (French, Spanish, and at one point, Japanese), the arts, and physical education. A high priority was placed on scientific inquiry, on integrating Jewish and general studies, and on promoting Hebrew both as a living language and as a portal to advanced Jewish study. The core curriculum was complemented by a variety of elective courses in the arts and sciences.

== Extracurricular activities ==
Extracurricular activities included student government, mock trial, debate, yearbook, and sports teams (cross country, soccer, volleyball, basketball, soccer, softball). Community service was an integral part of the school program, and was required for all students in grades 10 and 11.
