= Bloomfield Tech High School =

Vocational high school in Essex County, New Jersey, US

Location
- 209 Franklin Street; Bloomfield, Essex County, New Jersey 07003; United States; 40.7884°N 74.1903°W

Information
- Type: Vocational Public high school
- Closed: 2018 (Reopened for 2019-2020 school year)
- School district: Essex County Vocational Technical Schools
- NCES School ID: 3404800
- Principal: Ayisha Ingram-Robinson
- Faculty: 40.5 FTEs
- Grades: 9–12
- Enrollment: 483 (as of 2016-17)
- Student to teacher ratio: 11.9:1
- Colors: Red; White and Blue
- Athletics conference: Super Essex Conference
- Team name: Eagles
- Website: www.essextech.org/essex-county-bloomfield-tech-campus/

Bloomfield Tech High School (also Essex County Bloomfield Tech or Bloomfield Tech) is a regional public high school located in Bloomfield, that offered occupational and academic instruction for students in Essex County, in the U.S. state of New Jersey, as part of the Essex County Vocational Technical Schools. The school was also home to the first Green Energy Academy in a high school setting, which opened in 2009. The district offered adult programs in the evening at Bloomfield Tech.

As of the 2016-17 school year, the school had an enrollment of 483 students and 40.5 classroom teachers (on an FTE basis), for a student–teacher ratio of 11.9:1. There were 296 students (61.3% of enrollment) eligible for free lunch and 86 (17.8% of students) eligible for reduced-cost lunch.

At the end of the 2017-18 school year, Bloomfield Tech High School closed along with North 13th Street Tech and has been replaced by the newly constructed Donald M. Payne Sr. School of Technology in Newark. The students and staff of West Caldwell Tech used the former Bloomfield Tech facility while the West Caldwell school building was being renovated. Officials celebrated the official reopening of the renovated West Caldwell Tech with a ribbon-cutting ceremony in October 2021.

Bloomfield Tech High School was transferred from Essex County Vocational Technical Schools to Essex County in June 2023 after approval by the Essex County Vocational Technical Schools Board of Education during their March 13, 2023 meeting. The building was transferred for $100. (link: https://www.essextech.org/wp-content/uploads/sites/1003/2023/04/Agenda-3-13-23.pdf)

The Township of Bloomfield Town Council, during their October 2023 Council meeting, voted unanimously to purchase the property from Essex County for $10 Million. (link: http://bloomfieldtownnj.iqm2.com/Citizens/FileOpen.aspx?Type=12&ID=1395&Inline=True)

== Awards, recognition and rankings ==
In 2015, Bloomfield Tech was one of 15 schools in New Jersey, and one of nine public schools, recognized as a National Blue Ribbon School in the exemplary high performing category by the United States Department of Education.

During the 2009–10 school year, Bloomfield Tech High School was also awarded the Blue Ribbon School Award of Excellence by the United States Department of Education, the highest award an American school can receive.

Schooldigger.com ranked the school tied for 102nd out of 381 public high schools statewide in its 2011 rankings (an increase of 58 positions from the 2010 ranking) which were based on the combined percentage of students classified as proficient or above proficient on the mathematics (83.9%) and language arts literacy (99.1%) components of the High School Proficiency Assessment (HSPA).

== Athletics ==
The Bloomfield Tech Spartans compete in the Super Essex Conference, which is comprised of public and private high schools in Essex County and was established following a reorganization of sports leagues in Northern New Jersey by the New Jersey State Interscholastic Athletic Association (NJSIAA). With 400 students in grades 10-12, the school was classified by the NJSIAA for the 2015-16 school year as North II, Group I for most athletic competition purposes, which included schools with an enrollment of 73 to 481 students in that grade range.

The girls basketball team won the Group I state championship in 2004 (against runner-up Riverside High School in the playoff finals), 2005 (vs. Salem High School), 2006 (vs. Salem) and 2009 (vs. Gloucester City High School). The three consecutive state titles from 2004 to 2006 are tied for the seventh-longest streak in state history. In 2004, the girls' basketball team took the North II, Group I sectional title with a 70-44 win against Belvidere High School and went on to win the Group I state title with a 71-59 win against Riverside in the championship game played at the Ritacco Center. The team repeated as winner of the North II Group I title in 2005 with a 58-46 win against University High School.

The boys basketball team won the Group I state championship in 2003 (defeating Paulsboro High School in the tournament finals), 2004 (vs. Burlington City High School), 2006 (vs. LEAP Academy University Charter School) and 2007 (vs. Create Charter High School). After trailing by as many as 15 points, the team won the 2013 Group I title against Paulsboro by a 61-59 score in the playoff finals, with the winning basket coming as a buzzer beater to earn the program's first state championship. The team won the 2007 North II, Group I state sectional championship with a 78-74 win over Science Park High School. The team won the 2007 Group I state championship with a 73-59 win over Create Charter High School.

The boys and girls' basketball teams both won their respective Group I state championships in 2006, the boys defeating LEAP Academy University Charter School of Camden, 73-51, and the girls topping Salem High School.

== Administration ==
Core members of the school's administration are:

- Ayisha Ingram-Robinson – Principal

== Notable alumni ==
- Da'Sean Butler (born 1987), basketball player for Hapoel Be'er Sheva of the Israeli Premier League who was drafted by the Miami Heat in 2010.
- Hector Santiago (born 1987; class of 2006), starting pitcher for the Los Angeles Angels.
- Herb Scherer (1929–2012), professional basketball player for the Tri-Cities Blackhawks and New York Knicks.
