= Schechter Regional High School =

High school in New Jersey, United States

Coordinates: 40.885672°N 74.009242°W

Information
- Religious affiliation: Judaism
- Established: 2003
- Closed: 2007
- Gender: Mixed

Schechter Regional High School was a small, coeducational, Conservative Jewish High School, located in Teaneck, New Jersey, United States. It was founded in 2003, as an outgrowth of two lower Schechter elementary and middle schools in existence for the past 20 years. The school was led by Jay Dewey, and Rhonda Rosenheck. It was announced along with Solomon Schechter High School of New York in April 2006 that the new joint Metro Schechter Academy would be formed from the two schools and would be located in New Jersey starting in the fall of 2006. The renamed, merged school had its first and only graduating class in the spring of 2007.

In late August 2007, the school board announced that a long-time major donor had backed out from a pledge because of "personal financial losses," and the school was closed down.

== Curriculum ==
Schechter Regional High School offered an array of Judaic and secular classes on a daily basis.
