= Capital Preparatory Charter High School =

Public high school in Trenton, New Jersey, US

Coordinates: 40.206112°N 74.751134°W

- 202 Grand Street (grades 9-10); 22 Grand Street (grades 11-12); Trenton, NJ 08611

Information
- School type: Charter public high school
- Superintendent: Shenette Gray, School Leader
- Principal: Carl Bampoe (9-10); David Bilenker (11-12)
- Faculty: 19.0 (on FTE basis)
- Grades: 9th-12th
- Enrollment: 304 (as of 2010-11)
- Student to teacher ratio: 16.00:1
- Website: Capital Preparatory Charter High School

Capital Preparatory Charter High School was a charter public high school located in Trenton, New Jersey, that served students in ninth through twelfth grades from Trenton and Ewing Township. The school, which opened in August 2008, was shuttered in June 2011 in the wake of issues with its financial operations.

An audit conducted by the New Jersey Department of Education's Office of Fiscal Accountability and Compliance found a $300,000 deficit, among other issues, and the school surrendered its charter in May 2011 after two 90-day probationary periods and will close at the conclusion of the 2010–11 school year.

As of the 2010–11 school year, the school had an enrollment of 304 students and 19.0 classroom teachers (on an FTE basis), for a student–teacher ratio of 16.00:1. There were 187 students (61.5% of enrollment) eligible for free lunch and 22 (7.2% of students) eligible for reduced-cost lunch.
