= Hunterdon County Polytech Career Academy =

Public high school in New Jersey, US

Coordinates: 40.53569°N 74.85445°W

The Hunterdon County Polytech Career Academy is a vocational public high school that offers technical and career training to students in Hunterdon County, in the U.S. state of New Jersey, operating as part of the Hunterdon County Vocational School District. The school is situated at three separate facilities in Raritan Township, the Bartles Corner Campus located off of Bartles Corner Road, the Central Campus located next to the Hunterdon Central Regional High School Field House, and the ESC Campus located in Califon.

== List of Programs ==
Shared Time Programs: Construction Science Electrical Technology, Heavy Equipment Operator, HVAC/Plumbing Technology, 3D Computer Animation, Commercial Arts & Advertising Design, Graphic Design, Principles of Teaching, Allied Health, Healthcare Science, Culinary Arts & Hospitality, Cosmetology, Computer Networking & Cybersecurity, Law Enforcement & Homeland Security, Advanced Manufacturing & Aeronautical Sciences, Welding Technology, Automotive Technology, Auto Services/Diesel & Power Sports Technology, Fire Academy, Emergency Medical Technician (EMT) Academy, Career Prep Early College
