= Passaic County Technical Institute =

Vocational high school in Passaic County, New Jersey, US

Location
- 45 Reinhardt Road; Wayne, Passaic County, New Jersey 07470; United States; 40.9315°N 74.2043°W

Information
- Type: Vocational Public high school
- Motto: "Where Learning Has No Limit!"
- Established: 1917
- School district: Passaic County Vocational School District
- NCES School ID: 341263004860
- Principal: Antonio Garcia
- Faculty: 302.0 FTEs
- Grades: 9-12
- Enrollment: 3,660 (as of 2023–24)
- Student to teacher ratio: 12.1:1
- Colors: Blue and White
- Athletics conference: Big North Conference (general); North Jersey Super Football Conference (football)
- Team name: Bulldogs
- Website: pcti.pctvs.org/pcti

Passaic County Technical Institute (also known as PCTI, Passaic County Tech, Wayne Tech or simply Tech), is a vocational public high school in Wayne, that serves students in ninth through twelfth grades from all of Passaic County, in the U.S. state of New Jersey. It is located near the city of Paterson. PCTI offers some vocational classes in addition to several college credit courses. It is the sister school of the Diana C. Lobosco STEM Academy, with which it shares a campus and extracurricular programs.

As of the 2023–24 school year, the school had an enrollment of 3,660 students and 302.0 classroom teachers (on an FTE basis), for a student–teacher ratio of 12.1:1. There were 1,483 students (40.5% of enrollment) eligible for free lunch and 328 (9.0% of students) eligible for reduced-cost lunch. Based on 2021-22 data from the New Jersey Department of Education, PCTI was the largest high school in the state, one of 29 schools with more than 2,000 students.

== Awards, recognition, and rankings ==
Schooldigger.com ranked the school 212th out of 376 public high schools statewide in its 2010 rankings (an increase of 21 positions from the 2009 rank), which were based on the combined percentage of students classified as proficient or above proficient on the language arts literacy and mathematics components of the High School Proficiency Assessment (HSPA).

== History ==
In 1917, a group of businessmen in Paterson helped form Paterson Vocational School to train young men to enter the textile industry. The school accepted boys who were at least 14 years of age or in the sixth grade, and trained them for two years or until they were ready to assume a job in a factory or trade. From 1917 to the early 1940s, Paterson Vocational School continued to operate as a two-year school, gradually expanding its curriculum to include a wider variety of trades. During World War II, the school remained open around the clock providing men and women with the training to become machinists and draftsmen to design and construct the engines used in bombers, fighters and transport aircraft flown in the Pacific and European theaters. For its service, the school was honored by the War Department.

Aware of the part technology would play in the booming postwar economy, Paterson Vocational School applied for and received approval from the New Jersey Department of Education to become a full-fledged high school in 1946. Academic subjects were added, as were new trades like Refrigeration, Industrial Electric, and Electronics. The school was renamed Paterson Technical and Vocational High School and quickly gained the name Paterson Tech. Agriculture was offered to shared-time students attending Central High School (now Kennedy High School), with Paterson Tech renting a farm close to PCTI's present Wayne site, where students learned to raise farm animals and grow crops.

By the 1960s, the importance of vocational and technical education was becoming obvious, and in 1964, Paterson Mayor Frank X. Graves Jr. turned over Paterson Tech to the Passaic County Board of Chosen Freeholders, thereby providing all youngsters in Passaic County access to Passaic County Technical and Vocational High School. With students flooding in from all over the county, Passaic County Tech, now reaching a student population of 500 young men and one girl, was significantly overcrowded. The school's two buildings — one dating from the Civil War located at the corner of Summer and Ellison, the other a refurbished factory on Market Street — could not meet the demands. By 1965, plans were well underway to build a new school that would accommodate students for generations to come.

Provided with a Federal grant of $3,925,000 (equivalent to $40.1 million in 2025) — the largest ever awarded to that date — and research from a Citizens' Study Committee, the county chose a 59-acre (240,000 m^{2}) tract of land which it owned in Wayne, previously the site of Camp Hope.

Groundbreaking ceremonies were held in November 1966, and construction began 15 months later. On September 8, 1970, Passaic County Technical and Vocational High School — at the time, the largest technical/vocational high school in the state and third largest in the nation — opened its doors to close to 1,500 young men and women. In the 25 years since, PCTI has added two wings and an additional Special Needs building, a variety of academic courses and special programs, and has kept abreast of technological advances and economic trends by constantly updating vocational, occupational, and technical courses. Passaic County Tech has since been renamed Passaic County Technical Institute.

With construction completed, a new library (F-Wing Library), a separate gymnasium (the Athletic Center, which consists of an indoor pool, a basketball court, an indoor track, a spin room used by the physical education department, and a top-notch athletic training room), and an extension to the school's F-Wing (now the FX Wing) were added to PCTI. Also, part of the H-Wing was remodeled, the first and second floors, to comply with the new H-Wing bridge that connects to the lower end of the FX-Wing, which added a new BlackBox Theater. Several trailer-type classrooms have been installed behind the F and FX wing. A new STEM building has been constructed alongside PCTI's campus.

== Shops / majors ==
PCTI consists of 14 schools (as shown on the school's student application):

- Academy of Finance
- Academy of Information Technology
1. Information Technology and Network Security (formerly computer repair)
2. Computer Science
- Academy of Health and Medical Science
- School of Business
1. Logistics
2. Marketing
3. Management
- School of Applied Technology
1. Drafting (Computer-aided design / CAD)
2. Electronics
3. Manufacturing Technology
- School of Automotive Technology
- School of Communication Arts
1. Advertising Art & Design
2. Graphic Design & 3D Animation
3. Audio Visual Production
- School of Construction Technology
- School of Cosmetology
- School of Culinary Arts
- School of Education/Human Services/Child Development
- School of Engineering
- School of Performing Arts
1. Dance
2. Theater
3. Instrumental
4. Vocal
- Academy of Criminal Justice and Public Safety
- Biotechnology
- STEM Academy
  1. Computer Science
  2. Engineering
  3. Biomedical

== Extracurricular activities ==
The Passaic County Technical Institute Bulldogs compete in the Big North Conference, which is comprised of public and private high schools in Bergen and Passaic counties, and was established following a reorganization of sports leagues in Northern New Jersey by the New Jersey State Interscholastic Athletic Association (NJSIAA). For the 2009-10 school year, PCTI was part of the North Jersey Tri-County Conference, a conference established on an interim basis to facilitate the realignment. Prior to the realignment that took place in 2009, the school participated in the Skyline Division of the Northern Hills Conference, which included schools in Essex, Morris and Passaic counties. With 2,633 students in grades 10-12, the school was classified by the NJSIAA for the 2019–20 school year as Group IV for most athletic competition purposes, which included schools with an enrollment of 1,060 to 5,049 students in that grade range. The football team competes in the Liberty Blue division of the North Jersey Super Football Conference, which includes 112 schools competing in 20 divisions, making it the nation's biggest football-only high school sports league. The school was classified by the NJSIAA as Group V North for football for 2024–2026, which included schools with 1,317 to 5,409 students.

School colors are blue and white. Sports offered at the school include tennis (men and women), soccer (men and women), cross country (men and women), bowling (men and women), cheerleading (men and women), volleyball (men and women), track and field winter (men and women), football (men), swimming (men and women), track and field spring (men and women), lacrosse (men and women), golf (men and women), softball (women), wrestling (men), basketball (men and women) and baseball (men).

The boys' wrestling team won the North I Group IV sectional title in 1994 and won the North I Group V state sectional championship in 2017, 2019, 2020, 2023 and 2025.

The football team won the North I Group IV state sectional championships in 1998 and 2001, and won the North I Group V title in 2015 and 2025. The football team won the 1998 North I Section IV title game, defeating Union Hill High School 48-6 in the tournament final at Giants Stadium. The 2001 team finished the season with a record of 11-1 after winning the North I Group IV state sectional title by a score of 40-8 against Emerson High School of Union City in the championship game. The team won the North I Group V title in 2015, the program's third state championship, defeating Ridgewood High School in the tournament final by a score of 27-0 at MetLife Stadium. They again won the North I Group V title in 2025, defeating West Orange High School by a score of 23-14. They ultimately lost to Washington Township High School by a score of 31-12.

In 2007, the boys' basketball team won the North I, Group IV state championship, edging North Bergen High School by 86-85 in overtime, in a game played at Wayne Valley High School.

The swimming team won its first North I Group A sectional title in 2015 and repeated in 2016 with a win against Montclair High School in the sectional final, becoming the first varsity team at PCTI winning back-to-back titles.

PCTI has featured a Navy Junior ROTC unit since 2004.

== Administration ==
The principal of Passaic County Technical Institute is Antonio Garcia. His core administration team are the four assistant principals.

The principal of Passaic County Technical Institute Diana C. Lobosco STEM Academy is Joaquim Johnson

== Notable alumni ==
- Mike Adams (born 1981), safety for the Carolina Panthers of the NFL
- Derrick Etienne (born 1996), professional soccer player with Atlanta United
- Elease Evans (born 1943), politician who represented the 35th legislative district in the New Jersey General Assembly from 2007 to 2012
- Gerald Hayes (born 1980), linebacker for the Arizona Cardinals of the NFL
- Jim Lampley (born 1960), professional basketball center who played for the Philadelphia 76ers during the 1986–87 season
- We McDonald (born 1998), singer-songwriter who has been a contestant on The Voice and American Idol (in 2023 as Wé Ani)
- Marcel Shipp (born 1978), running back for the Las Vegas Locomotives of the United Football League
- Carter Warren (born 1999), American football offensive tackle for the New York Jets
