= Camden Academy Charter High School =

Charter school in Camden County, New Jersey, US

Location
- 250 Federal Street; Camden, Camden County, New Jersey 08103; United States
- 39.9437881°N 75.1255898°W

Information
- Type: Charter public high school
- Motto: The Passport to the Future
- Established: 2001
- Sister school: Camden's Promise, Camden's Pride, Katz Dalsey Academy
- School district: Camden Charter School Network
- NCES School ID: 340078503390
- Principal: Dara Ash; Kent Edwards
- Faculty: 202.0 FTEs
- Grades: 9-12
- Enrollment: 2,457 (as of 2024–25)
- Student to teacher ratio: 12.2:1
- Colors: Black; White and Burgundy
- Team name: Cougars
- Newspaper: The Daily Claw
- Website: www.promiseacademycharter.org/o/cachs

Camden Academy Charter High School is a four-year public charter high school that serves students in ninth through twelfth grades from Camden, in Camden County, in the U.S. state of New Jersey. The school is part of Camden's Promise Charter School and operates under the terms of a charter granted by the New Jersey Department of Education.

As of the 2024–25 school year, the school had an enrollment of 2,457 students and 202.0 classroom teachers (on an FTE basis), for a student–teacher ratio of 12.2:1. There were 1,978 students (80.5% of enrollment) eligible for free lunch and 265 (10.8% of students) eligible for reduced-cost lunch.

== Awards, recognition and honors ==
The school was the 249th-ranked public high school in New Jersey out of 339 schools statewide in New Jersey Monthly magazine's September 2014 cover story on the state's "Top Public High Schools".

== Athletics ==
The Camden Academy Charter High School Cougars compete independently of any league or conference and operates under the auspices of the New Jersey State Interscholastic Athletic Association. With 505 students in grades 10-12, the school was classified by the NJSIAA for the 2019–20 school year as Group II for most athletic competition purposes, which included schools with an enrollment of 486 to 758 students in that grade range. Interscholastic sports offered by the school include baseball, basketball (men and women), softball and volleyball (men and women), and swim (men and women).

== Administration ==
The school's co-principals are Dara Ash and Kent Edwards. The core administration team includes two vice principals.
