= Islamic School of Trenton =

Islamic school in New Jersey, United States

Location
- 25 Oxford Street; Trenton, NJ 08638
- 40.2280°N 74.7601°W

Information
- Type: Private
- Religious affiliation: Islam
- Established: 2001
- NCES School ID: A0502297
- Principal: Amina Shareef
- Faculty: 7
- Grades: PreK-9
- Enrollment: 47
- Student to teacher ratio: 7:1
- Hours in school day: 7
- Website: www.islamicschooloftrenton.org

Islamic School of Trenton is a private Islamic School that serves students from pre-kindergarten to ninth grade. The school is located in Trenton in Mercer County, New Jersey, United States.

== History ==
The Islamic School of Trenton was established as the I.M.B.I. Day School in September, 2001, as a service for families in the Trenton community with Pre-Kindergarten and Kindergarten aged children. One grade has been added every year. The students are taught all academic subjects in accordance with state guidelines, along with Islamic studies, Arabic language, reading, and memorizing Qur'an.

== Hifz School ==
The school has a Quran hifz program, where students are served in memorizing the Quran.
