= Capital City High School =

Alternative high school in Mercer County, New Jersey, US

Location
- 135 East Hanover Street; Trenton, Mercer County, New Jersey 08608; United States
- Coordinates: 40.220643°N 74.763242°W

Information
- Type: Public high school
- School district: Trenton Public Schools
- NCES School ID: 341629000449
- Principal: Dana Williamson
- Faculty: 37.5 FTEs
- Grades: 9-12
- Enrollment: 617 (as of 2023–24)
- Student to teacher ratio: 16.5:1
- Website: cchs.trentonk12.org

Capital City High School is a four-year alternative public high school that serves students in ninth through twelfth grades from Trenton, in Mercer County, in the U.S. state of New Jersey, operating as part of the Trenton Public Schools. The school offers daytime programs for students who have faced challenges in the traditional school setting, as well as evening programs for those ages 21 and older. A 30/60 day course program offers six cycles throughout the year in which students take a four-hour core course on a daily basis for 30 days while also taking a two-hour elective for 60 days in each cycle.

As of the 2023–24 school year, the school had an enrollment of 617 students and 37.5 classroom teachers (on an FTE basis), for a student–teacher ratio of 16.5:1. There were 185 students (30.0% of enrollment) eligible for free lunch and 8 (1.3% of students) eligible for reduced-cost lunch.

== Administration ==
The principal is Dana Williamson, with two vice principals.
