= M.E.T.S. Charter School =

Defunct charter high school in Essex and Hudson County, New Jersey, United States

Location
- 211 Sherman Avenue; Jersey City, Hudson County, New Jersey 07307; United States
- 40.747837°N 74.044876°W

Information
- Type: Charter public high school
- Established: 2011
- Closed: 2020
- NCES School ID: 340075303183
- Administrator: Ian Fallstich
- Faculty: 43.9 FTEs
- Grades: 6-12
- Enrollment: 713 (as of 2019–20)
- Student to teacher ratio: 16.2:1
- Website: www.metscharterschool.org

M.E.T.S. Charter School (formally known Mathematics, Engineering, Technology, & Science Charter School) was a seven-year comprehensive public charter middle school / high school that serves students in sixth through twelfth grades in Hudson County and Essex County of New Jersey, United States. The M.E.T.S. Charter School had two campuses, one in Jersey City and one in Newark. The school operates under the terms of a charter granted by the New Jersey Department of Education. M.E.T.S. Charter School was an Early College Preparatory School that utilizes research-based instructional practices to achieve student proficiency in mathematics, engineering, technology, and science. M.E.T.S. Charter School encouraged students to take college level courses and graduate from high school within four years with up to sixty college credits or an associate degree. Postsecondary success was promoted by prioritizing admission to a four-year college or university for each member of the graduating class.

In February 2020, New Jersey Commissioner of Education Lamont Repollet ordered the school to close at the end of the 2019-20 school year citing the school for "not operating in compliance with its charter".

As of the 2019–20 school year, the school had an enrollment of 713 students and 43.9 classroom teachers (on an FTE basis), for a student–teacher ratio of 16.2:1. There were 451 students (63.3% of enrollment) eligible for free lunch and 53 (7.4% of students) eligible for reduced-cost lunch.

== Athletics ==
The M.E.T.S. Charter School Mustangs competed independently of any league or conference for soccer, volleyball, and softball. Both boys and girls' basketball teams are part of the N.J. Charter School Athletic League. All athletics operate under the auspices of the New Jersey State Interscholastic Athletic Association. With 505 students in grades 10-12, the school had been classified by the NJSIAA for the 2019–20 school year as Group II for most athletic competition purposes, which included schools with an enrollment of 486 to 758 students in that grade range.
