= Pioneer Academy =

Private school in Passaic County, New Jersey, United States

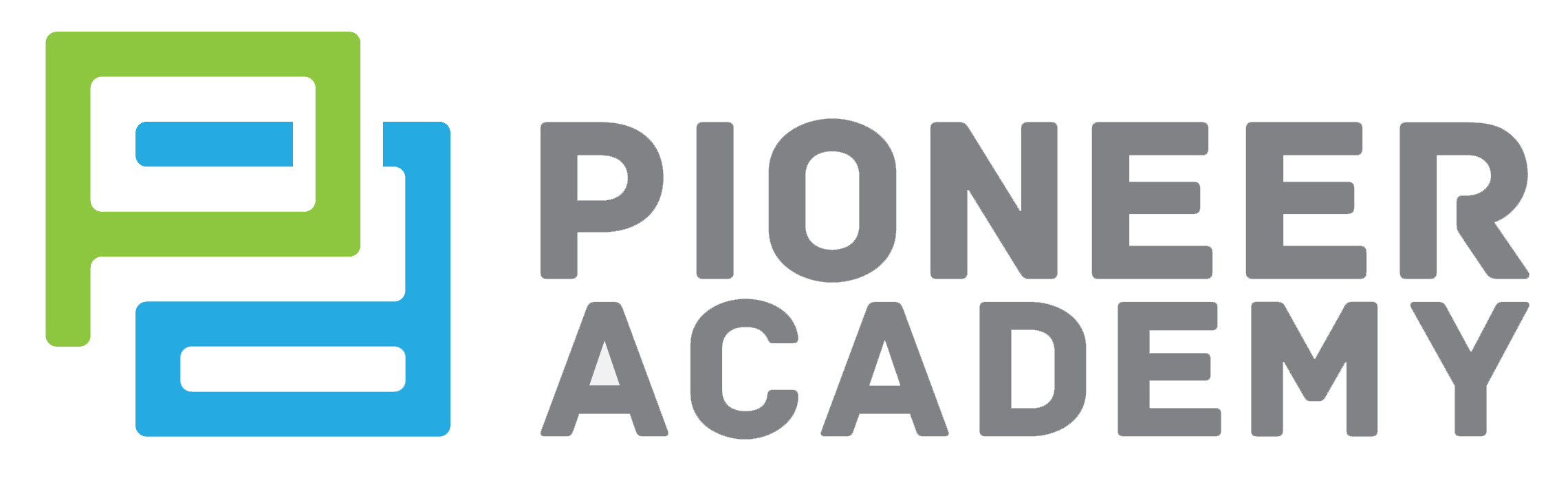

Location
- 164 Totowa Road; Wayne, Passaic County, New Jersey 07470; United States; 40.914971°N 74.233795°W

Information
- Type: Private school
- Motto: Curiosity, Creativity, Compassion, Commitment
- Established: 1999
- NCES School ID: A0106959
- Head of school: Owen O. Akman
- Faculty: 47 FTEs
- Grades: PreK–12
- Enrollment: 415 (plus 26 in PreK, as of 2023–24)
- Student to teacher ratio: 8.8:1
- Tuition: $31,290/32,290 (grades 9–10/11–12 for 2025–26)
- Website: pioneeracademy.org

Pioneer Academy is an independent college-preparatory school for grades PreK through 12, located in Wayne, in Passaic County, in the U.S. state of New Jersey. The Pioneer Academy curriculum focuses on studies of science, mathematics, cultural studies, and language. The school was founded in 1999 and moved from Clifton to its Wayne campus at the start of the 2013-14 school year. In 2024, the school was one of 11 schools in the state recognized by the National Blue Ribbon Schools Program as an Exemplary High Performing School.

As of the 2023–24 school year, the school had an enrollment of 415 students (plus 26 in PreK) and 47 classroom teachers (on an FTE basis), for a student–teacher ratio of 8.8:1. The school's student body was 63.1% (262) White (Including Middle-Eastern origin), 27.0% (112) Asian, 4.3% (18) Hispanic, 3.9% (16) Black, 1.4% (6) two or more races and 0.2% (1) American Indian / Alaska Native.

== History ==
Pioneer is a co-educational day school for PreK-12 and a boys-only boarding school for high school students. The school is located in Wayne, New Jersey, about 30 minutes west of New York City.

- 1999 – Established as a middle school at 366 Clifton Avenue in Clifton, New Jersey
- 2006 – Opened second campus at 1255 Main Avenue in Clifton. Began catering to Pre-K through 12th grade
- 2008 – Gained I-20 issuing privileges
- 2009 – Started accepting international students
- 2011 – Became an all-boys high school. Remained co-ed middle school. The elementary school temporarily closed
- 2013 – Moved to 164 Totowa Road in Wayne, New Jersey, offering on-campus housing for students
- 2014 – Changed school name from Pioneer Academy of Science to Pioneer Academy
- 2014 - Became Co-ed Pre-K through 12th Grade
- 2017 - Pre-K Montessori program opened
- 2024 - Awarded National Department of Education Blue Ribbon Status
- 2026 - Recognized as a State School of Character

== Academics and Classes ==
As of the 2026-2027 school year, Pioneer Academy offers the following AP Classes:

- African American Studies
- AP Biology
- AP Business with Personal Finance
- AP Calculus
- AP Chemistry
- AP Comparative Government and Politics
- Computer Science A
- Computer Science Principles
- English Language and Composition
- English Literature and Composition
- European History
- Human Geography
- Macroeconomics
- Microeconomics
- Physics
- Precalculus
- Psychology
- Seminar
- Statistics
- U.S. Government and Politics
- U.S. History
- World History: Modern

The school also offers a few NJIT Duel Enrollment classes, in addition to their wide variety of AP courses

== Athletics ==
The Pioneer Academy Eagles participate in the New Jersey State Interscholastic Athletics Association (NJSIAA) with 8 different sport teams.

Fall teams include Girl's Volleyball (JV/V) and Boy's Varsity Soccer

Winter teams include Girl's Basketball (JV/V), Boy's Basketball (JV/V), and Wrestling

The Spring sports teams include Girl's Flag Football (Added 25-26 School year) and Boy's Varsity Volleyball.

Currently, the school is starting to begin the process of the construction of the gymnasium, which is stated to be 11,000 Sq. Ft.

== Extracurriculars ==
Pioneer Academy offers a wide variety of Extracurriculars, including Model UN, Debate, Best Buddies, Mock Trial, Yearbook, Life Savers, HOSA, Science Olympiad, Key Club, ELL Book Club, Chess, Mu Alpha Theta, Russian Culture, Unicef, DECA, Future Business Leaders of America, National Alliance on Mental Health Illness-Wellness and Mental Health Advocacy, USA Computing Olympiad, PioTech Robotics, American Institute of Architecture, Calligraphy, USA Biology Olympiad, Eagle Ambassadors, Physics Bowl, Spanish Cooking, Musical Performance, Eagle's Den Broadcasting, and many others.

Clubs depend on student interest, and many students start their own clubs, the Broadcasting Club being one of many examples.

== Awards and recognition ==
On Niche, the school is ranked as the #1 Private School in Passaic County

During the Best Buddies Club's first year (2024-2025), the chapter had obtained the Best Buddies Outstanding Chapter of the Year award, which is given to only one or two schools per state.
