= LEAP Academy University Charter School =

Charter school in Camden County, New Jersey, US

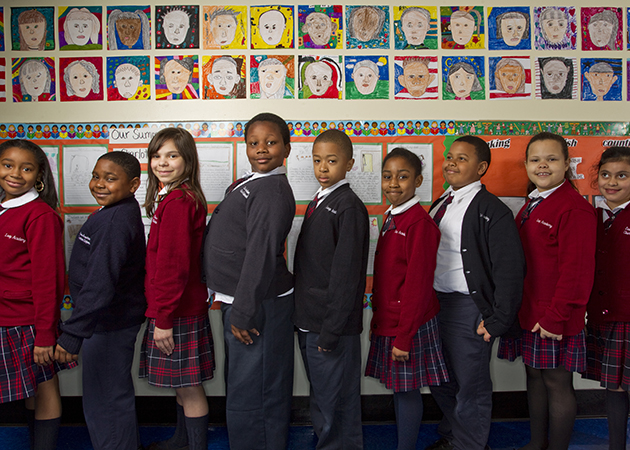
- Leap Academy University Charter School in 2011

Location
- 549 Cooper Street (Upper); 639 Cooper Street (Lower); Camden, Camden County, New Jersey 08105; United States
- 39.945904°N 75.094302°W

Information
- Type: Charter school
- Established: 1997
- NCES School ID: 340007800487
- Faculty: 102.0 FTEs
- Grades: K–12
- Enrollment: 1,553 (as of 2023–24)
- Student to teacher ratio: 15.2:1
- Color: Navy Blue
- Team name: Lancers
- Website: www.leapacademycharter.org

LEAP (Leadership, Education, and Partnership) Academy University Charter School is a charter school that serves students in kindergarten through twelfth grades from Camden, in Camden County, in the U.S. state of New Jersey. The school operates under the terms of a charter granted by the New Jersey Department of Education. Founded in 1997, the school is split into three divisions, a K-6 lower school, a 7-12 upper school and a STEM high school for grades 9-12.

As of the 2023–24 school year, the school had an enrollment of 1,553 students and 102.0 classroom teachers (on an FTE basis), for a student–teacher ratio of 15.2:1. There were 1,086 students (69.9% of enrollment) eligible for free lunch and 91 (5.9% of students) eligible for reduced-cost lunch.

== History ==
Based on an idea by Gloria Bonilla-Santiago, the school was one of the initial group of 16 statewide granted a charter by the New Jersey Department of Education and was the only school in South Jersey to be granted a charter. The school opened in September 1997 in temporary facilities with 324 students in grades K-5, who had been selected by lottery from 500 applications submitted.

The school moved to its permanent location on Cooper Street in 1999 and graduated its first eighth-grade class in July 2001, by which time the school had an enrollment of 500 students in grades K-8. The school opened for grades 9-12 with a total high school enrollment of 216 students for the 2001-02 school year under the terms of a second charter.

== Awards, recognition and rankings ==
The school was the 213th-ranked public high school in New Jersey out of 339 schools statewide in New Jersey Monthly magazine's September 2014 cover story on the state's "Top Public High Schools".

== Athletics ==
The LEAP Academy Lions sports programs are overseen by the New Jersey State Interscholastic Athletic Association. The school is not affiliated with a league or conference. With 350 students in grades 10-12, the school was classified by the NJSIAA for the 2019–20 school year as Group I for most athletic competition purposes, which included schools with an enrollment of 75 to 476 students in that grade range.

== Administration ==
Core administration are

- Early Learning Academy - Stephanie Rogers, Director
- Lower Elementary - Shanell Hartman, Principal
- Upper Elementary/Intermediate - Jovita Veguilla, Principal
- High School - Dana Rivas, Principal
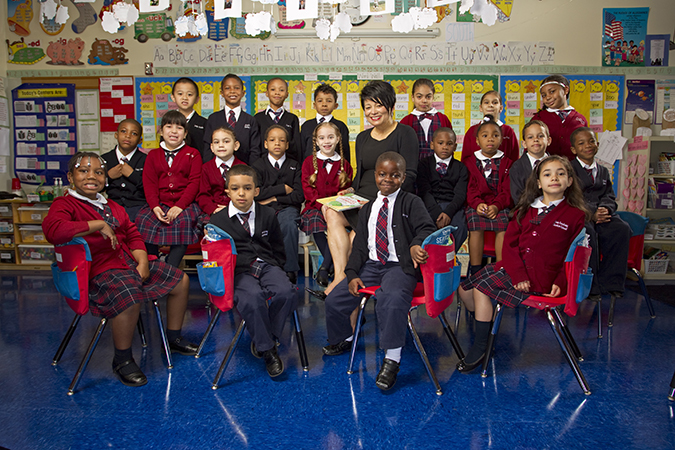
Gloria Bonilla-Santiago with students in 2011

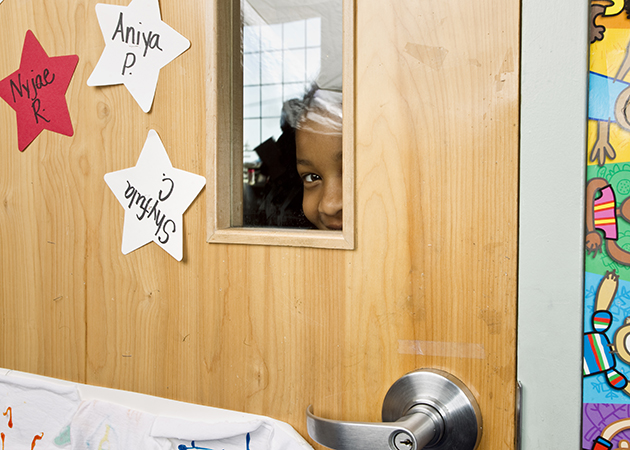
Leap Academy University Charter School in 2011

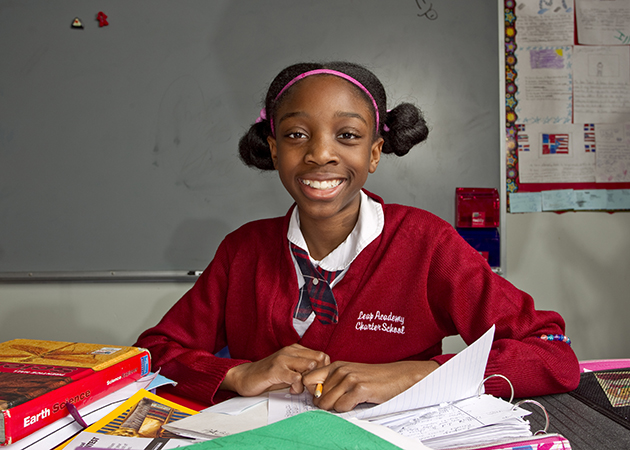
Leap Academy University Charter School in 2011

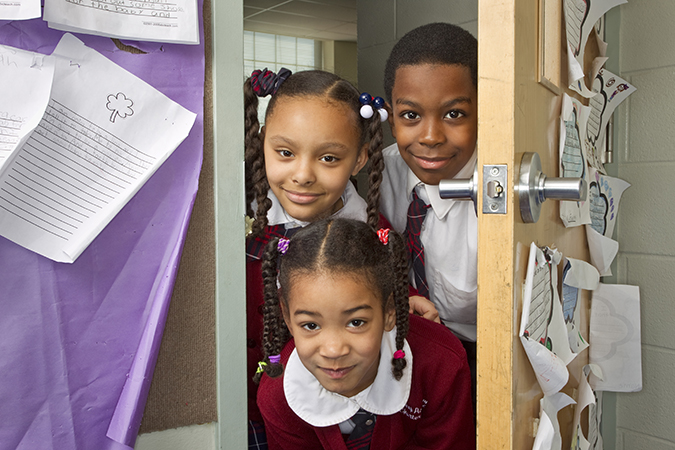
Leap Academy University Charter School in 2011

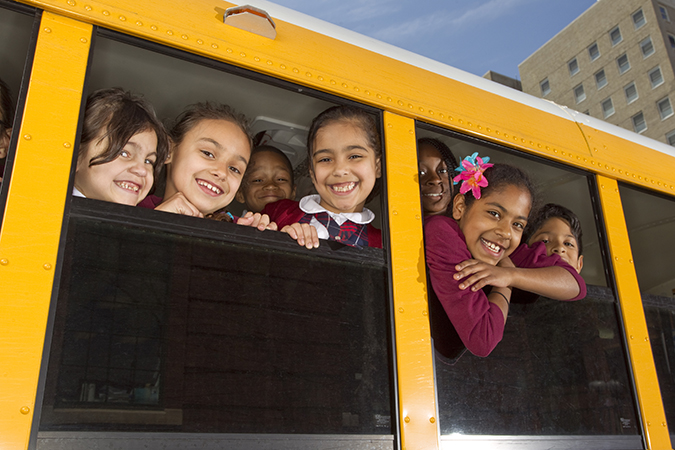
Leap Academy University Charter School in 2011

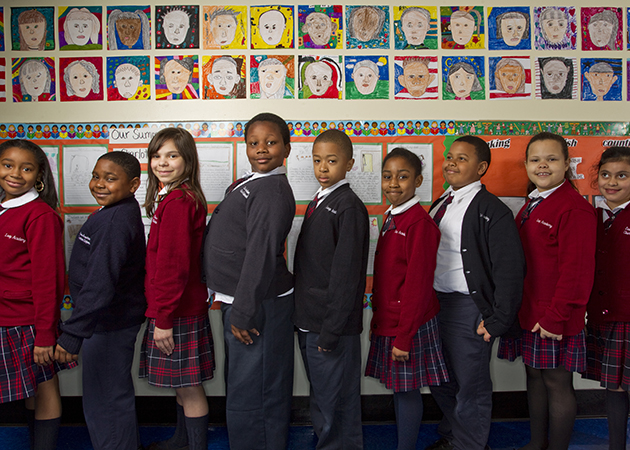
Leap Academy University Charter School in 2011
