= International High School (New Jersey) =

High school in Passaic County, New Jersey, US

Location
- 200 Grand Street; Paterson, Passaic County, New Jersey 07502; United States; 40.9095°N 74.1798°W

Information
- Type: Public high school
- Established: 2001
- School district: Paterson Public Schools
- NCES School ID: 341269000809
- Principal: Catherine Forfia
- Faculty: 52.0 FTEs
- Grades: 9-12
- Enrollment: 650 (as of 2024–25)
- Student to teacher ratio: 12.5:1
- Website: ihs.paterson.k12.nj.us

International High School is a four-year public high school in Paterson, Passaic County, in the U.S. state of New Jersey, that serves students in ninth through twelfth grades operating as part of the Paterson Public Schools. The school is intended to create an educational environment that "respects diversity and celebrates the multicultural atmosphere of Paterson". It offers a curriculum of international and global studies that also address government, business, legal, and law enforcement subjects. It stresses key organizational skills, such as oral speaking and presentations, research, and debate. Students are required to work to be conversant in a language other than their native language.

As of the 2024–25 school year, the school had an enrollment of 650 students and 52.0 classroom teachers (on an FTE basis), for a student–teacher ratio of 12.5:1. There were 480 students (73.8% of enrollment) eligible for free lunch and 18 (2.8% of students) eligible for reduced-cost lunch.

The school district hired a private investigator to look into the reasons behind the significant percentage of students in the district who opted out of mandated PARCC testing in the 2014-15 school year, including 30% at the co-located International High School and Garret Morgan Academy.

== History ==
The high school opened in 2001 with an enrollment of 160 students, as one of three themed academy programs opened that year. The school had occupied several leased sites, the final one being the former Don Bosco Technical High School, which was then purchased by the New Jersey Schools Construction Corporation (SCC) in May 2004 for $6.3 million to house students while buildings it was developing were being constructed.

The school's new 113,500-square-foot (10,540 m^{2}), four-story building opened in September 2008 for its 420 students, a few days after school started, due to some last-minute delays. The SCC estimated that the building would cost $31.9 million (equivalent to $58 million in 2025) when it was first proposed in 2001. The SCC approved the project in October 2004, estimating that the building would be completed by 2006 at a cost of $29.6 million (equivalent to $50.5 million in 2025). By the time the building was completed in 2008, the final cost had ballooned to roughly $49 million (equivalent to $73.3 million in 2025), which included millions of dollars in design, remediation, and site acquisition that were not included in the approved funding. The New Jersey Schools Development Authority (successor to the SCC), awarded a $35.5 million construction contract in 2006, with technology upgrades adding $3 million, and another $2 million for environmental work and demolition. Problems with the fire alarm system were anticipated to take several weeks to resolve after the building opened, and Paterson fire marshals were paid $1,500 per day to patrol the school until the problems with the system were resolved.

The new building includes a two-floor library, four science labs, five soundproof music practice rooms, two gymnasiums and an outdoor athletic field, a 500-seat auditorium and 15 classrooms. The new facility, which was nestled into a steep hill underneath and next to Interstate 80, has triple pane windows to keep out the noise from the highway.

== Awards, recognition and rankings ==
The school was the 272nd-ranked public high school in New Jersey out of 339 schools statewide in New Jersey Monthly magazine's September 2014 cover story on the state's "Top Public High Schools", using a new ranking methodology. The school had been ranked 238th in the state of 328 schools in 2012, after being ranked 228th out of 322 schools in its 2010 magazine story. New Jersey Monthly developed the 2012 rankings based on data from New Jersey School Report Card for 2010-2011 school year from New Jersey Department of Education.

Schooldigger.com ranked the school 243rd out of 389 public high schools statewide in its 2011-2012 school year rankings, which were based on the combined percentage of students classified as proficient or above proficient on the language arts literacy and mathematics components of the High School Proficiency Assessment (HSPA). This was a significant improvement from 2009-2010 when it was ranked 354th out of 376 public high schools.

== Administration ==
The school's principal is Catherine Forfia. Her administration team includes the vice principal.
