= North 13th Street Tech =

Location
- 300 North 13th Street; Newark, NJ 07107; United States
- Coordinates: 40.766010°N 74.190926°W

Information
- Type: Vocational public high school
- Closed: 2018
- School district: Essex County Vocational Technical Schools
- Principal: Patricia Clark-Jeter
- Faculty: 58.8 FTEs
- Grades: 9–12
- Enrollment: 677 (as of 2015-16)
- Student to teacher ratio: 11.5:1
- Colors: Columbia blue navy blue and white
- Athletics conference: Super Essex Conference
- Team name: Cougars
- Website: www.essextech.org/essex-county-north-13th-street-tech/

North 13th Street Tech was a regional public high school located in Newark, that offers occupational and academic instruction for students in Essex County, New Jersey, United States, serving students in ninth through twelfth grades as part of the Essex County Vocational Technical Schools.

As of the 2015-16 school year, the school had an enrollment of 677 students and 58.8 classroom teachers (on an FTE basis), for a student–teacher ratio of 11.5:1. There were 519 students (76.7% of enrollment) eligible for free lunch and 79 (11.7% of students) eligible for reduced-cost lunch.

At the end of the 2017-2018 school year, North 13th Street Tech closed along with Bloomfield Tech High School and has been replaced by the newly constructed Donald M. Payne Sr. School of Technology in Newark.

== Awards, recognition and rankings ==
Schooldigger.com ranked the school as 134th out of 389 public high schools statewide in its 2012 rankings (an increase of 118 positions from the previous ranking) which were based on the combined percentage of students classified as proficient or above proficient on the language arts literacy (83.5%) and mathematics (99.3%) components of the High School Proficiency Assessment (HSPA).

== Athletics ==
The North 13th Street Tech Cougars compete in the Super Essex Conference, under the jurisdiction of the New Jersey State Interscholastic Athletic Association (NJSIAA). With 538 students in grades 10-12, the school was classified by the NJSIAA for the 2015–16 school year as North II, Group II for most athletic competition purposes, which included schools with an enrollment of 508 to 770 students in that grade range.

== Administration ==
Core members of the school's administration are:

- Patricia Clark-Jeter, Principal
