= Neumann Preparatory School =

Location
- 970 Black Oak Ridge Road; Wayne, New Jersey 07470; United States; 40.97260°N 74.27086°W

Information
- Type: Private, Day, College-prep
- Religious affiliations: Roman Catholic (Diocesan)
- Established: 1965; 61 years ago
- Status: Closed
- Closed: 1990
- Grades: 9–12
- Team name: Wildcats
- Accreditation: Middle States Association of Colleges and Schools
- Yearbook: Krinein (κρίνειν)
- Alumni: Neumanites or Neumies

Neumann Preparatory School (known familiarly as Neumann Prep) was a private, Catholic college-preparatory school located in Wayne, New Jersey, within the Roman Catholic Diocese of Paterson. It was founded as The Blessed John Neumann Preparatory Seminary in 1965. In 1970 Neumann was designated a Preparatory School and was all-male until the 1974–1975 academic year.

The school was named for Saint John Neumann.

Neumann Prep closed at the end of the 1989–1990 academic year. Since then the campus has been the site of a Montessori school and the Lakeview Learning Center. The current tenants are the Al-Ghazaly High School. The site is also headquarters of TSF Academy, a well respected soccer academy in Northern New Jersey. The property was owned by the Diocese of Paterson.

== Sale of the property ==
In July, 2022 the Diocese of Paterson sold the property to the Academy of Greatness & Excellence, an Islamic school based in Ridgefield Park, NJ. The AGE is not affiliated with Al-Ghazaly High School.

The 25-acre property was purchased for $13.5 million.

== Notable alumni ==
- Fr. Dennis E. Tamburello, O.F.M, Ph.D. (Class of 1971) is a Franciscan Friar, Author and Professor of Religious Studies at Siena College. He is also a chaplain for the NY State Dept. of Corrections. His areas of scholarly research include the Reformation (especially John Calvin), mysticism, Bernard of Clairvaux, and inter-religious dialogue.
- William J. Nardini (born 1969, class of 1986), United States circuit judge of the United States Court of Appeals for the Second Circuit.
- Michael Bluhm (born 1969, class of 1987), EVP and Chief Financial Officer of Host Hotels and Resorts, a S&P 500 company. Prior to he was a managing director in the investment banking group at Morgan Stanley.
- Rev. Msgr. John E. Hart, JCL (Class of 1973) is the Pastor of The Assumption of the Blessed Virgin Mary parish, Morristown, NJ. He is the former Chancellor of the Diocese of Paterson and is currently the Diocesan Director of Clergy Personnel and Chair, Presbyteral Council.
- Joseph A. Mecca, Esq. (Class of 1974) is an attorney and former member of the New Jersey General Assembly (1990 to 1992).
