= Diana C. Lobosco STEM Academy =

Vocational high school in Passaic County, New Jersey, US

PCTI STEM Academy

Location
- 45 Reinhardt Road; Wayne, Passaic County, New Jersey 07470; United States
- 40.9315°N 74.2043°W

Information
- Type: Vocational Public high school
- Established: 2018
- School district: Passaic County Vocational School District
- NCES School ID: 341263003477
- Principal: Joaquim Johnson
- Faculty: 81.0 FTEs
- Grades: 9-12
- Enrollment: 885 (as of 2023–24)
- Student to teacher ratio: 10.9:1
- Colors: Blue and White
- Athletics conference: Big North Conference (general); North Jersey Super Football Conference (football)
- Team name: Bulldogs
- Website: stem.pctvs.org/stem

PCTI STEM Academy is a vocational public high school in Wayne, that serves students in ninth through twelfth grades from all of Passaic County, in the U.S. state of New Jersey.

As of the 2023–24 school year, the school had an enrollment of 885 students and 81.0 classroom teachers (on an FTE basis), for a student–teacher ratio of 10.9:1. There were 248 students (28.0% of enrollment) eligible for free lunch and 53 (6.0% of students) eligible for reduced-cost lunch.

== History ==
The Passaic County Board of Chosen Freeholders approved $30 million in bonds in September 2016 that would be used to construct a school focusing on biomedical, computer science and engineering fields, with a capacity of 1,200 students.

Governor of New Jersey Phil Murphy attended the school's ribbon cutting ceremnony in August 2018.

== Extracurricular activities ==
Athletic programs are shared between the district's two schools. The Passaic County Technical Institute Bulldogs compete in the Big North Conference, which is comprised of public and private high schools in Bergen and Passaic counties, and was established following a reorganization of sports leagues in Northern New Jersey by the New Jersey State Interscholastic Athletic Association (NJSIAA). With 2,633 students in grades 10-12, the school was classified by the NJSIAA for the 2019chool/darren-cooper/2020/07/23/nj-football-analyzing-new-super-football-conference-2020-schedule/5496440002/ "Here's what we know about the new Super Football Conference 2020 schedule"], The Record, July 23, 2020. Accessed March 22, 2021. "The Super Football Conference (SFC) is a 112-team group, the largest high school football-only conference in America, and is comprised of teams from five different counties." The school was classified by the NJSIAA as Group V North for football for 2024–2026, which included schools with 1,317 to 5,409 students.

== Administration ==
The principal is Joaquim Johnson, who is assisted by two assistant principals.
