= Roseland School District =

School district in Essex County, New Jersey, US

Address
- 100 Passaic Avenue Roseland, Essex County, New Jersey, 07068; United States
- Coordinates: 40.824488°N 74.315926°W

District information
- Grades: PreK to 6
- Superintendent: Giuseppe Leone
- Business administrator: Deborah Muscara (interim)
- Schools: 1

Students and staff
- Enrollment: 469 (as of 2022–23)
- Faculty: 45.1 FTEs
- Student–teacher ratio: 10.4:1

Other information
- District Factor Group: I
- Website: www.roselandnjboe.org
Ind.	Per pupil	District spending	Rank (*)	K-6 average	%± vs. average
1A	Total Spending	$18,771	37	$18,891	−0.6%
1	Budgetary Cost	14,073	27	13,649	3.1%
2	Classroom Instruction	8,589	25	8,366	2.7%
6	Support Services	2,500	35	2,161	15.7%
8	Administrative Cost	1,569	27	1,467	7.0%
10	Operations & Maintenance	1,374	20	1,552	−11.5%
13	Extracurricular Activities	22	16	39	−43.6%
16	Median Teacher Salary	60,053	37	57,437
Data from NJDoE 2014 Taxpayers' Guide to Education Spending. *Of K-6 districts with any number of students. Lowest spending=1; Highest=59

The Roseland School District is a community public school district that serves students in pre-kindergarten through sixth grade from Roseland, in Essex County, in the U.S. state of New Jersey.

As of the 2022–23 school year, the district, comprised of one school, had an enrollment of 469 students and 45.1 classroom teachers (on an FTE basis), for a student–teacher ratio of 10.4:1.

The district is classified by the New Jersey Department of Education as being in District Factor Group "I", the second-highest of eight groupings. District Factor Groups organize districts statewide to allow comparison by common socioeconomic characteristics of the local districts. From lowest socioeconomic status to highest, the categories are A, B, CD, DE, FG, GH, I and J.

Students in public school for seventh through twelfth grades attend the West Essex Regional School District, a regional school district serving students from four municipalities in western Essex County. Communities served by the district's schools are Essex Fells, Fairfield, North Caldwell and Roseland. Schools in the district (with 2021–22 enrollment data from the National Center for Education Statistics) are West Essex Middle School with 548 students in grades 7-8 and West Essex High School with 1,048 students in grades 9-12.

== Schools ==
- Lester C. Noecker Elementary School had an enrollment of 465 students in grades PreK-6 (as of the 2021–22 school year). The school was built in 1967. The school mascot is the wise owl and the colors are red and white.
  - Raul Sandoval, principal

== Administration ==
Core members of the district's administration are:

- Giuseppe Leone, superintendent
- Deborah Muscara, interim business administrator and board secretary

== Board of education ==
The district's board of education, composed of five members, sets policy and oversees the fiscal and educational operation of the district through its administration. As a Type II school district, the board's trustees are elected directly by voters to serve three-year terms of office on a staggered basis, with either one or two seats up for election each year held (since 2012) as part of the November general election. The board appoints a superintendent to oversee the district's day-to-day operations and a business administrator to supervise the business functions of the district.
