= Essex Fells School District =

School district in Essex County, New Jersey, US

Address
- 102 Hawthorne Road Essex Fells, Essex County, New Jersey, 07021; United States
- Coordinates: 40.830321°N 74.280283°W

District information
- Grades: K-6
- Superintendent: Michelle V. Gadaleta
- Business administrator: Steven Lella
- Schools: 1

Students and staff
- Enrollment: 254 (as of 2024–25)
- Faculty: 26.5 FTEs
- Student–teacher ratio: 9.6:1

Other information
- District Factor Group: J
- Website: District website
Ind.	Per pupil	District spending	Rank (*)	K-6 average	%± vs. average
1A	Total Spending	$22,766	53	$18,891	20.5%
1	Budgetary Cost	17,783	53	13,649	30.3%
2	Classroom Instruction	11,345	55	8,366	35.6%
6	Support Services	2,659	44	2,161	23.0%
8	Administrative Cost	1,983	55	1,467	35.2%
10	Operations & Maintenance	1,772	42	1,552	14.2%
13	Extracurricular Activities	4	1	39	−89.7%
16	Median Teacher Salary	60,325	38	57,437
Data from NJDoE 2014 Taxpayers' Guide to Education Spending. *Of K-6 districts with any number of students. Lowest spending=1; Highest=59

The Essex Fells School District is a community public school district that serves students in pre-kindergarten through sixth grade from Essex Fells, in Essex County, in the U.S. state of New Jersey.

As of the 2024–25 school year, the district, comprised of one school, had an enrollment of 254 students and 26.5 classroom teachers (on an FTE basis), for a student–teacher ratio of 9.6:1.

The district had been classified by the New Jersey Department of Education as being in District Factor Group "J," the highest of eight groupings. District Factor Groups organize districts statewide to allow comparison by common socioeconomic characteristics of the local districts. From lowest socioeconomic status to highest, the categories are A, B, CD, DE, FG, GH, I and J.

Students in public school for seventh through twelfth grades attend the West Essex Regional School District, a regional school district serving students from Essex Fells, Fairfield, North Caldwell and Roseland. Schools in the district (with 2024–25 enrollment data from the National Center for Education Statistics) are West Essex Middle School with 5581,061 students in grades 7–8 and West Essex High School with 1,123 students in grades 9–12.

== Awards and recognition ==
In 2016, the school was one of ten schools in New Jersey recognized as a National Blue Ribbon School by the United States Department of Education, a recognition celebrating excellence in academics.

== School ==
Essex Fells School had an enrollment of 251 students in grades PreK–6 as of the 2024–25 school year.

- Michelle V. Gadaleta, principal

== Administration ==
Core members of the district's administration are:

- Michelle V. Gadaleta, superintendent
- Steven Lella, business administrator and board secretary

== Board of education ==
The district's board of education, comprised of five members, sets policy and oversees the fiscal and educational operation of the district through its administration. As a Type II school district, the board's trustees are elected directly by voters to serve three-year terms of office on a staggered basis, with one or two seats up for election each year held (since 2012) as part of the November general election. The board appoints a superintendent to oversee the district's day-to-day operations and a business administrator to supervise the business functions of the district.
