= Fairfield School District =

School district in Essex County, New Jersey, US

Address
- 15 Knoll Road Fairfield, Essex County, New Jersey, 07004; United States
- Coordinates: 40.878641°N 74.29232°W

District information
- Grades: Pre-K to 6
- Superintendent: Susan Ciccotelli
- Business administrator: Kathleen Marano
- Schools: 2

Students and staff
- Enrollment: 694 (as of 2022–23)
- Faculty: 69.3 FTEs
- Student–teacher ratio: 10.0:1

Other information
- District Factor Group: GH
- Website: www.fpsk6.org
Ind.	Per pupil	District spending	Rank (*)	K-6 average	%± vs. average
1A	Total Spending	$17,241	28	$18,891	−8.7%
1	Budgetary Cost	14,369	33	13,649	5.3%
2	Classroom Instruction	9,155	31	8,366	9.4%
6	Support Services	2,206	29	2,161	2.1%
8	Administrative Cost	1,585	29	1,467	8.0%
10	Operations & Maintenance	1,334	17	1,552	−14.0%
16	Median Teacher Salary	55,874	24	57,437
Data from NJDoE 2014 Taxpayers' Guide to Education Spending. *Of K-6 districts with any number of students. Lowest spending=1; Highest=59

The Fairfield School District is a community public school district that serves students in pre-kindergarten through sixth grade from Fairfield, in Essex County, in the U.S. state of New Jersey.

As of the 2022–23 school year, the district, comprising two schools, had an enrollment of 694 students and 69.3 classroom teachers (on an FTE basis), for a student–teacher ratio of 10.0:1.

The district is classified by the New Jersey Department of Education as being in District Factor Group "GH", the third-highest of eight groupings. District Factor Groups organize districts statewide to allow comparison by common socioeconomic characteristics of the local districts. From lowest socioeconomic status to highest, the categories are A, B, CD, DE, FG, GH, I and J.

Students in public school for seventh through twelfth grades attend the West Essex Regional School District, a regional school district in western Essex County serving students from Essex Fells, Fairfield, North Caldwell and Roseland. Schools in the district (with 2022–23 enrollment data from the National Center for Education Statistics) are West Essex Middle School with 599 students in grades 7-8 and West Essex High School with 1,043 students in grades 9-12.

== Schools ==
Schools in the district (with 2022–23 enrollment data from the National Center for Education Statistics) are:

- Adlai E. Stevenson Elementary School with 309 students in pre-Kindergarten through third grade
  - Michael Trubucco, principal
- Winston S. Churchill School with 384 students in fourth through sixth grade
  - Ray Santana, principal

== Administration ==
Core members of the district's administration are:

- Susan Ciccotelli, superintendent
- Kathleen Marano, business administrator and board secretary

== Board of education ==
The district's board of education, composed of five members, sets policy and oversees the fiscal and educational operation of the district through its administration. As a Type II school district, the board's trustees are elected directly by voters to serve three-year terms of office on a staggered basis, with either one or two seats up for election each year held (since 2012) as part of the November general election. The board appoints a superintendent to oversee the district's day-to-day operations and a business administrator to supervise the business functions of the district.
