= North Caldwell Public Schools =

School district in Essex County, New Jersey, US

Address
- 132A Gould Avenue North Caldwell, Essex County, New Jersey, 07006; United States
- Coordinates: 40.850989°N 74.276444°W

District information
- Grades: PreK-6
- Superintendent: Linda Freda
- Business administrator: Michael Halik
- Schools: 2

Students and staff
- Enrollment: 691 (as of 2023–24)
- Faculty: 70.2 FTEs
- Student–teacher ratio: 9.8:1

Other information
- District Factor Group: J
- Website: www.ncboe.org
Ind.	Per pupil	District spending	Rank (*)	K-6 average	%± vs. average
1A	Total Spending	$18,433	34	$18,891	−2.4%
1	Budgetary Cost	15,836	40	13,649	16.0%
2	Classroom Instruction	9,852	42	8,366	17.8%
6	Support Services	2,050	24	2,161	−5.1%
8	Administrative Cost	1,938	52	1,467	32.1%
10	Operations & Maintenance	1,990	47	1,552	28.2%
16	Median Teacher Salary	53,354	15	57,437
Data from NJDoE 2014 Taxpayers' Guide to Education Spending. *Of K-6 districts with any number of students. Lowest spending=1; Highest=59

The North Caldwell Public Schools is a community public school district that serves students in pre-kindergarten through sixth grade from North Caldwell, in Essex County, in the U.S. state of New Jersey.

As of the 2023–24 school year, the district, comprised of two schools, had an enrollment of 691 students and 70.2 classroom teachers (on an FTE basis), for a student–teacher ratio of 9.8:1.

The district had been classified by the New Jersey Department of Education as being in District Factor Group "J", the-highest of eight groupings. District Factor Groups organize districts statewide to allow comparison by common socioeconomic characteristics of the local districts. From lowest socioeconomic status to highest, the categories are A, B, CD, DE, FG, GH, I and J.

North Caldwell is home to the West Essex Regional School District, which also serves public school students from Fairfield, Essex Fells and Roseland in seventh through twelfth grades. Schools in the district (with 2023–24 enrollment data from the National Center for Education Statistics) are West Essex Middle School with 622 students in grades 7-8 and West Essex High School with 1,055 students in grades 9-12.

== Awards and recognition ==
Gould / Mountain School was one of nine schools in New Jersey honored in 2020 by the National Blue Ribbon Schools Program, which recognizes high student achievement.

== Schools ==
Schools in the district (with 2023–24 enrollment data from the National Center for Education Statistics) are:

- Grandview School with 395 students in grades PreK–3
  - Francesco Bifulco, principal
- Gould School with 283 students in grades 4–6
  - Chris Checchetto, principal

== Administration ==
Core members of the district's administration are:

- Linda Freda, superintendent
- Michael Halik, school business administrator and board secretary

== Board of education ==
The district's board of education, comprised of five members, sets policy and oversees the fiscal and educational operation of the district through its administration. As a Type II school district, the board's trustees are elected directly by voters to serve three-year terms of office on a staggered basis, with either one or two seats up for election each year held (since 2012) as part of the November general election. The board appoints a superintendent to oversee the district's day-to-day operations and a business administrator to supervise the business functions of the district.
