= Caldwell County Schools (disambiguation) =

Caldwell County Schools is a school district in North Carolina.

Caldwell County Schools may also refer to:

- Caldwell County Schools (Kentucky), a school district in Kentucky

== See also ==
Caldwell-West Caldwell Public Schools in Essex County, New Jersey
