= Pleasantdale, New Jersey =

Populated place in Essex County, New Jersey, US

- Census-designated place
- Location in Essex County Location in New Jersey Location in the United States
- Coordinates: 40°48′37″N 74°15′37″W
- Country: United States
- State: New Jersey
- County: Essex
- Township: West Orange

Area
  - Total: 0.79 sq mi (2.05 km^{2})
  - Land: 0.79 sq mi (2.05 km^{2})
  - Water: 0 sq mi (0.00 km^{2})
- Elevation: 422 ft (129 m)

Population (2020)
  - Total: 2,329
  - Density: 2,948.5/sq mi (1,138.42/km^{2})
- Time zone: UTC−05:00 (Eastern (EST))
  - Summer (DST): UTC−04:00 (EDT)
- ZIP Code: 07052 (West Orange)
- Area codes: 862/973
- FIPS code: 34-59385
- GNIS feature ID: 2806166

Pleasantdale is a census-designated place (CDP) located in West Orange Township, Essex County, in the U.S. state of New Jersey. As of the 2020 census, Pleasantdale had a population of 2,329. It is in the northwest part of the township, bordered to the north by Eagle Rock Avenue, to the east by Pleasant Valley Way, to the south by Interstate 280, and to the west by Livingston Township and the borough of Roseland. The boundaries of the CDP may differ from local understanding of the community's extent. Crestmont Country Club atop Second Watchung Mountain occupies the western side of the CDP.

== Demographics ==
Historical population
Census	Pop.	Note	%±
2020	2,329		—
U.S. Decennial Census; 2020

Pleasantdale was first listed as a census designated place in the 2020 U.S. census.

=== 2020 census ===
As of the 2020 census, Pleasantdale had a population of 2,329. The median age was 42.2 years. 23.4% of residents were under the age of 18 and 17.7% of residents were 65 years of age or older. For every 100 females there were 96.7 males, and for every 100 females age 18 and over there were 93.7 males age 18 and over.

100.0% of residents lived in urban areas, while 0.0% lived in rural areas.

There were 772 households in Pleasantdale, of which 39.2% had children under the age of 18 living in them. Of all households, 67.7% were married-couple households, 9.6% were households with a male householder and no spouse or partner present, and 17.6% were households with a female householder and no spouse or partner present. About 14.2% of all households were made up of individuals and 8.3% had someone living alone who was 65 years of age or older.

There were 797 housing units, of which 3.1% were vacant. The homeowner vacancy rate was 0.5% and the rental vacancy rate was 0.0%.

Pleasantdale CDP, New Jersey – Racial and ethnic composition Note: the US Census treats Hispanic/Latino as an ethnic category. This table excludes Latinos from the racial categories and assigns them to a separate category. Hispanics/Latinos may be of any race.
Race / Ethnicity (NH = Non-Hispanic)	Pop 2020	2020
White alone (NH)	1,240	53.24%
Black or African American alone (NH)	533	22.89%
Native American or Alaska Native alone (NH)	0	0.00%
Asian alone (NH)	175	7.51%
Native Hawaiian or Pacific Islander alone (NH)	0	0.00%
Other race alone (NH)	20	0.86%
Mixed race or Multiracial (NH)	86	3.69%
Hispanic or Latino (any race)	275	11.81%
Total	2,329	100.00%
