= Joe Yeninas =

American cartoonist and illustrator (1934–2020)

- Born: May 10, 1934
- Died: May 29, 2020 (aged 86); Neptune Township, New Jersey, U.S.
- Occupation(s): Cartoonist, illustrator

Joe Yeninas (May 10, 1934 – May 29, 2020) was an American cartoonist and illustrator for the Newark Evening News, the Associated Press, and The Journal of Commerce.

Yeninas lived in Holmdel Township, New Jersey since the mid-1990s, having moved there from North Caldwell, New Jersey.
