= Glen Ridge Public Schools =

School district in Essex County, New Jersey, US

Address
- 12 High Street Glen Ridge, Essex County, New Jersey, 07028; United States
- Coordinates: 40.800578°N 74.202296°W

District information
- Grades: PreK-12
- Superintendent: Winnie Kievit (acting)
- Business administrator: Barbara Murphy
- Schools: 5

Students and staff
- Enrollment: 1,810 (as of 2023–24)
- Faculty: 147.8 FTEs
- Student–teacher ratio: 12.3:1

Other information
- District Factor Group: I
- Website: www.glenridge.org
Ind.	Per pupil	District spending	Rank (*)	K-12 average	%± vs. average
1A	Total Spending	$15,979	10	$18,891	−15.4%
1	Budgetary Cost	13,441	27	14,783	−9.1%
2	Classroom Instruction	7,892	26	8,763	−9.9%
6	Support Services	1,764	12	2,392	−26.3%
8	Administrative Cost	1,880	63	1,485	26.6%
10	Operations & Maintenance	1,406	18	1,783	−21.1%
13	Extracurricular Activities	488	56	268	82.1%
16	Median Teacher Salary	65,010	43	64,043
Data from NJDoE 2014 Taxpayers' Guide to Education Spending. *Of K-12 districts with 1,800-3,500 students. Lowest spending=1; Highest=68

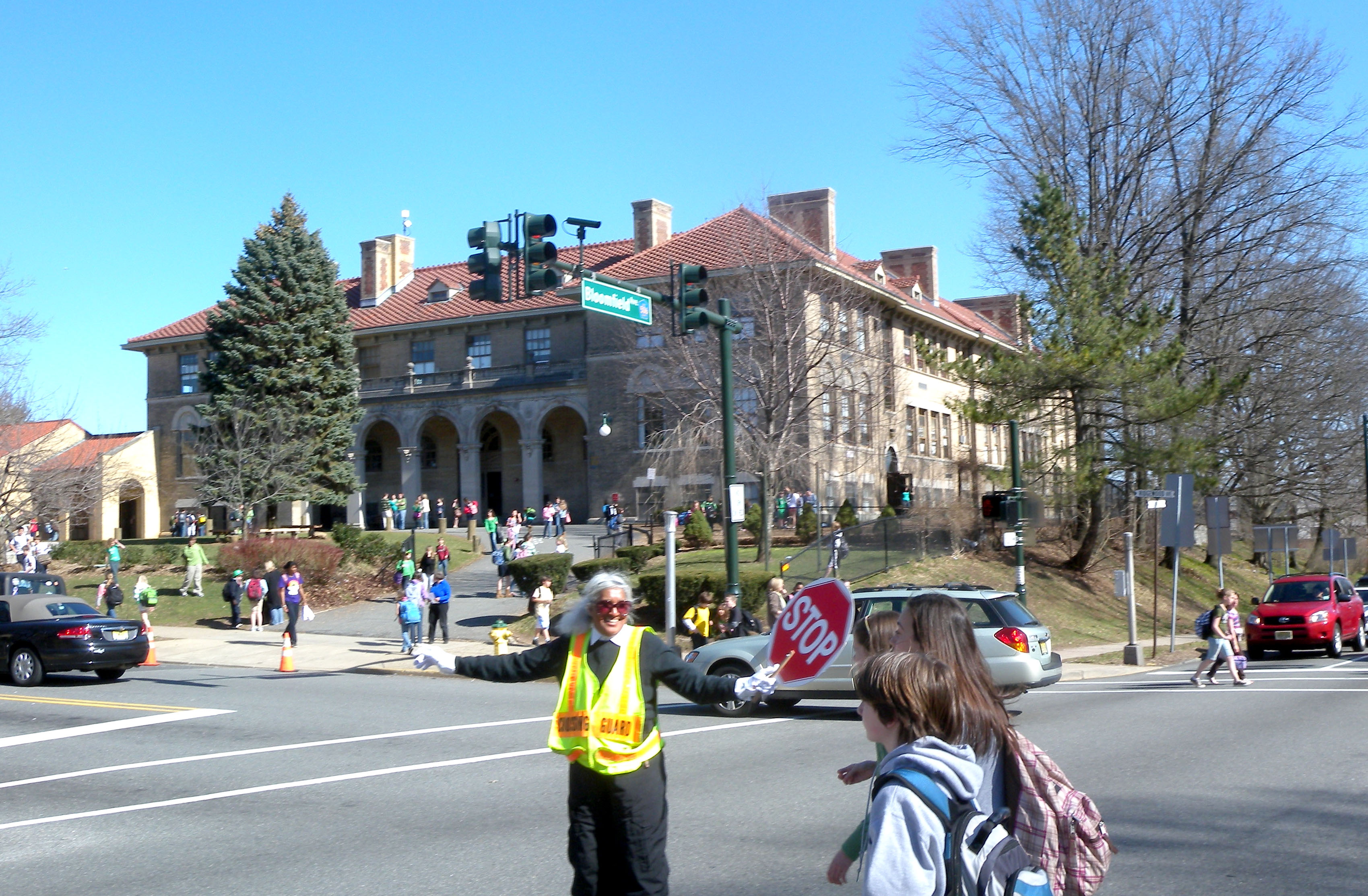
Crossing guard

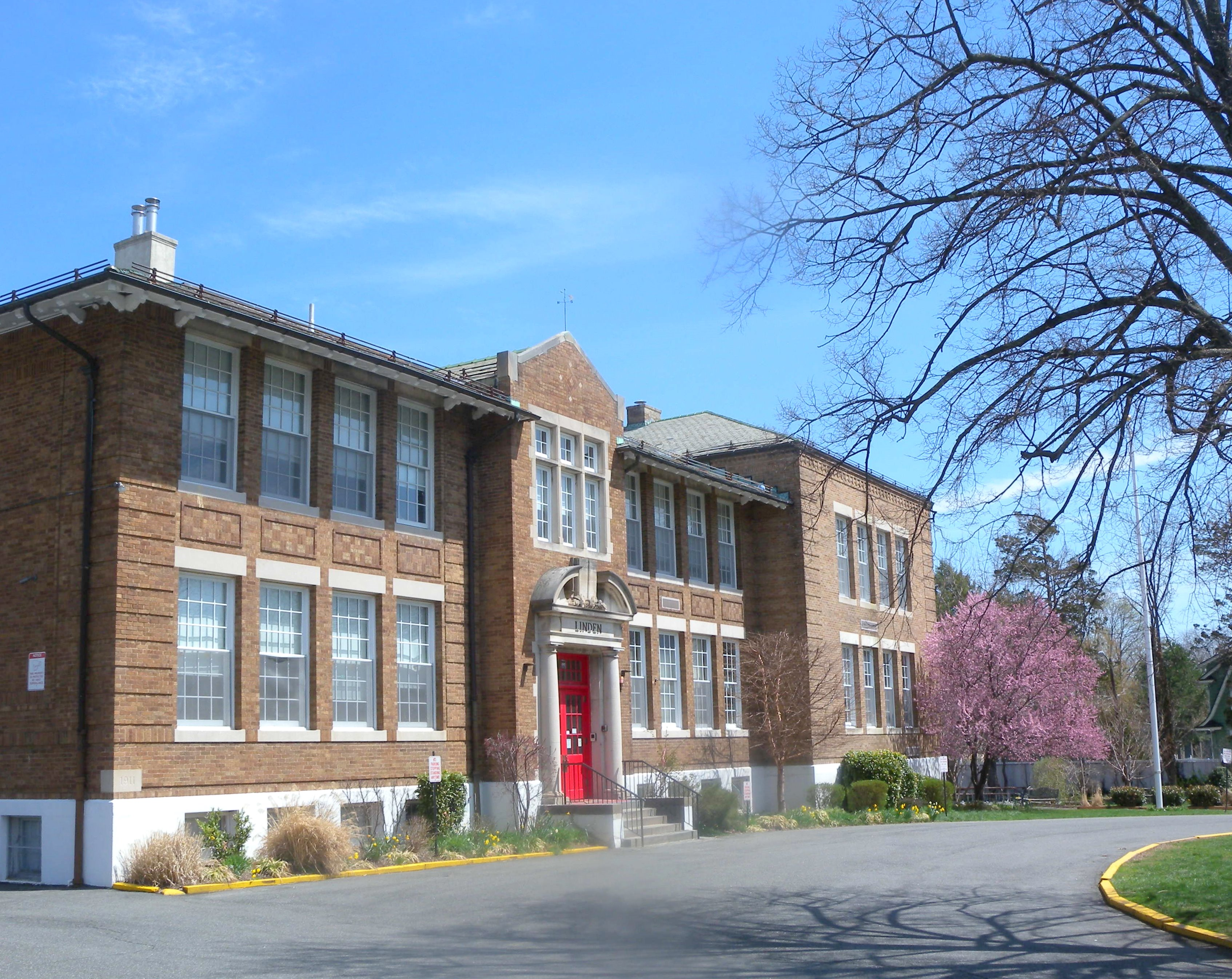
Linden Avenue School

The Glen Ridge Public Schools is a comprehensive public school district serving students in kindergarten through twelfth grade in Glen Ridge, in Essex County, in the U.S. state of New Jersey.

As of the 2023–24 school year, the district, comprised of five schools, had an enrollment of 1,810 students and 147.8 classroom teachers (on an FTE basis), for a student–teacher ratio of 12.3:1.

The district had been classified by the New Jersey Department of Education as being in District Factor Group "I", the second-highest of eight groupings. District Factor Groups organize districts statewide to allow comparison by common socioeconomic characteristics of the local districts. From lowest socioeconomic status to highest, the categories are A, B, CD, DE, FG, GH, I and J.

== Schools ==
Schools in the district (with 2023–24 enrollment data from the National Center for Education Statistics) are:

- Central School with 136 students in grades PreK–2
  - Jack DeWitt, principal
- Forest Avenue School with 145 students in grades PreK–2
  - Matthew J. Murphy, principal
- Linden Avenue School with 158 students in grades PreK–2
  - Joseph A. Caravela, principal
- Ridgewood Avenue School with 539 students in grades 3–6
  - Keisha Harris, principal
- Glen Ridge High School with 811 students in grades 7–12. The high school gained national attention as the school of the athletes involved in the Glen Ridge Rape.
  - John Lawlor, principal

== Administration ==
Core members of the district's administration are:

- Winnie Kievit, acting superintendent
- Barbara Murphy, business administrator and board secretary

== Board of education ==
The district's board of education, comprised of nine members, sets policy and oversees the fiscal and educational operation of the district through its administration. As a Type II school district, the board's trustees are elected directly by voters to serve three-year terms of office on a staggered basis, with three seats up for election each year held (since 2013) as part of the November general election. The board appoints a superintendent to oversee the district's day-to-day operations and a business administrator to supervise the business functions of the district.
