= John LoCascio =

American lacrosse player

Personal information
- Nationality: American
- Born: November 25, 1991 (age 34) Paterson, New Jersey, U.S.
- Height: 5 ft 10 in (178 cm)
- Weight: 190 lb (86 kg; 13 st 8 lb)

Sport
- Position: Defense
- MLL team: Dallas Rattlers
- NCAA team: Villanova Wildcats

Career highlights
- Big East Defensive Player of the Year (2013, 2014); First Team All Big East (2013, 2014); Big East Championship All-Tournament team (2013, 2014)

John LoCascio (born November 25, 1991, in Paterson, New Jersey) is a lacrosse player for the Dallas Rattlers in Major League Lacrosse.

A native of Fairfield Township, Essex County, New Jersey, LoCascio attended West Essex High School.

== Professional MLL career ==
LoCascio was selected with the 26th pick of the 2014 Major League Lacrosse Collegiate Draft by the Rochester Rattlers. In his rookie season, LoCascio appeared in 11 games and managed to gain 3 points and 44 ground balls. In his second season of play, LoCascio played in 15 games managing to obtain 6 points and 69 ground balls.

LoCascio went with the team in its move to Dallas, Texas in 2018. He played in four games, getting one goal and an assist with 11 ground balls.

== Prep and college career ==
At Villanova, LoCascio played as a long-stick midfielder; he appeared in 61 games and gathered 28 points.

== NCAA Statistics ==
		Regular Season
Season	Team	GP	G	A	Pts
2011	Villanova	16	0	0	0
2012	Villanova	15	1	1	2
2013	Villanova	14	2	6	8
2014	Villanova	16	5	13	18
College totals		61	8	20	28
