= Essex County, New Jersey =

County in New Jersey, United States

- County
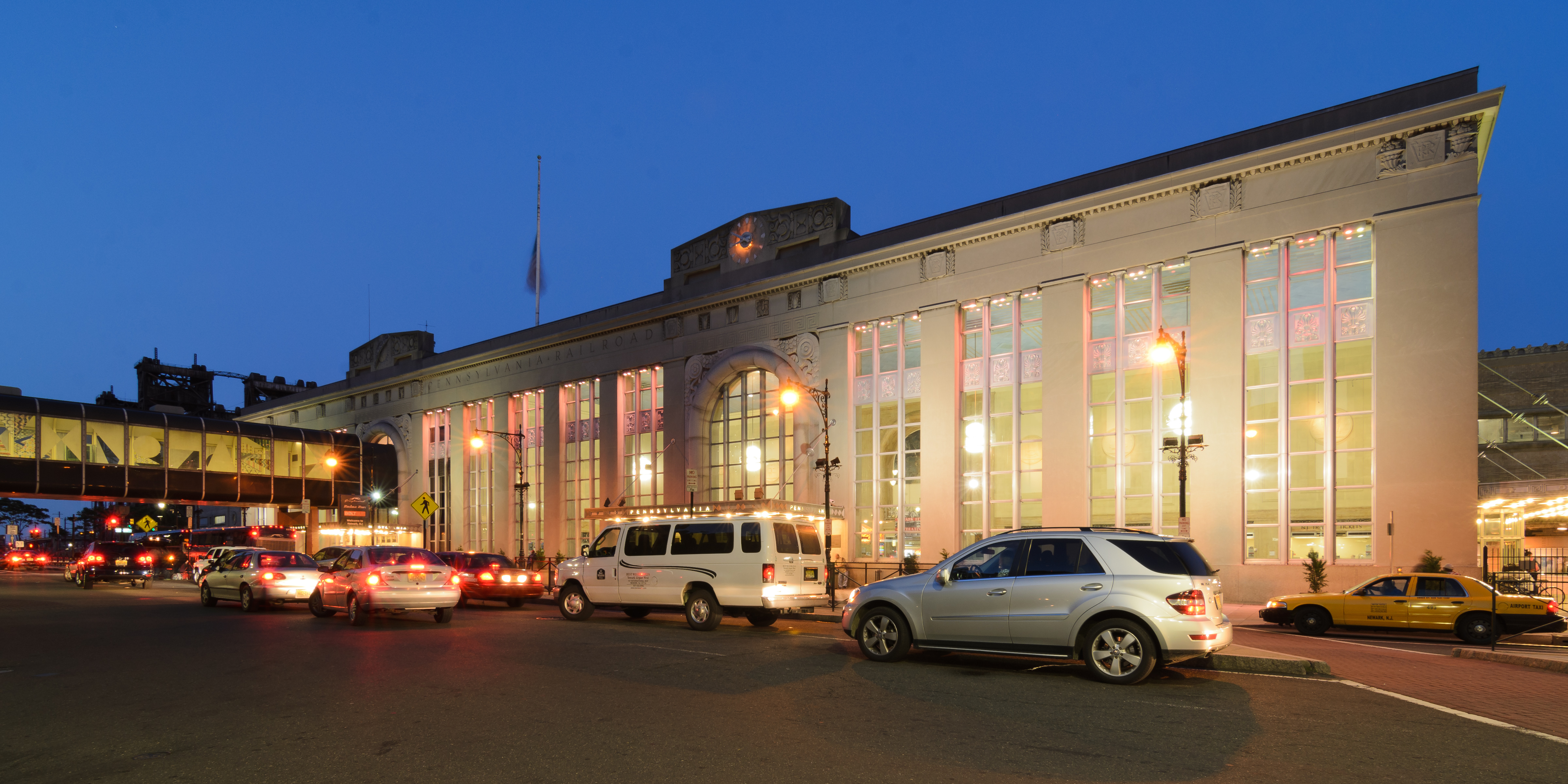
- Newark Penn Station in Newark at dusk in June 2015

- Flag Seal

- Location within the U.S. state of New Jersey
- Interactive map of Essex County, New Jersey
- Coordinates: 40.79°N 74.25°W
- Country: United States
- State: New Jersey
- Founded: March 7, 1683
- Named for: Essex, England
- Seat: Newark
- Largest city: Newark (population and area)

Government
  - County executive: Joseph N. DiVincenzo Jr. (D, term ends December 31, 2026)

Area
  - Total: 129.42 sq mi (335.2 km^{2})
  - Land: 126.09 sq mi (326.6 km^{2})
  - Water: 3.34 sq mi (8.7 km^{2}) 2.6%

Population (2020)
  - Total: 863,728
  - Estimate (2025): 896,379 ▲
  - Density: 6,850.1/sq mi (2,644.8/km^{2})
- Time zone: UTC−5 (Eastern)
  - Summer (DST): UTC−4 (EDT)
- Congressional districts: 8th, 10th, 11th
- Website: essexcountynj.org

Essex County is located in the northeastern part of the U.S. state of New Jersey, and is one of the centrally located counties in the New York metropolitan area. As of the 2020 census, the county was the state's second-most populous county, with a population of 863,728, its highest decennial count since the 1970 census and an increase of 79,759 (+10.2%) from the 2010 census count of 783,969. The county is part of the North Jersey region of the state.

The United States Census Bureau's Population Estimates Program estimated a 2025 population of 896,379, an increase of 32,651 (+3.8%) from the 2020 decennial census. Its county seat is Newark, the state's most populous city with a 2020 census population of 311,549.

In 2015, the county had a per capita personal income of $60,030, the eighth-highest in New Jersey and 153rd highest of 3,113 counties in the U.S. The Bureau of Economic Analysis ranked the county as having the 94th-highest per capita income of all 3,113 counties in the U.S. and seventh-highest in New Jersey in 2009.

== History ==
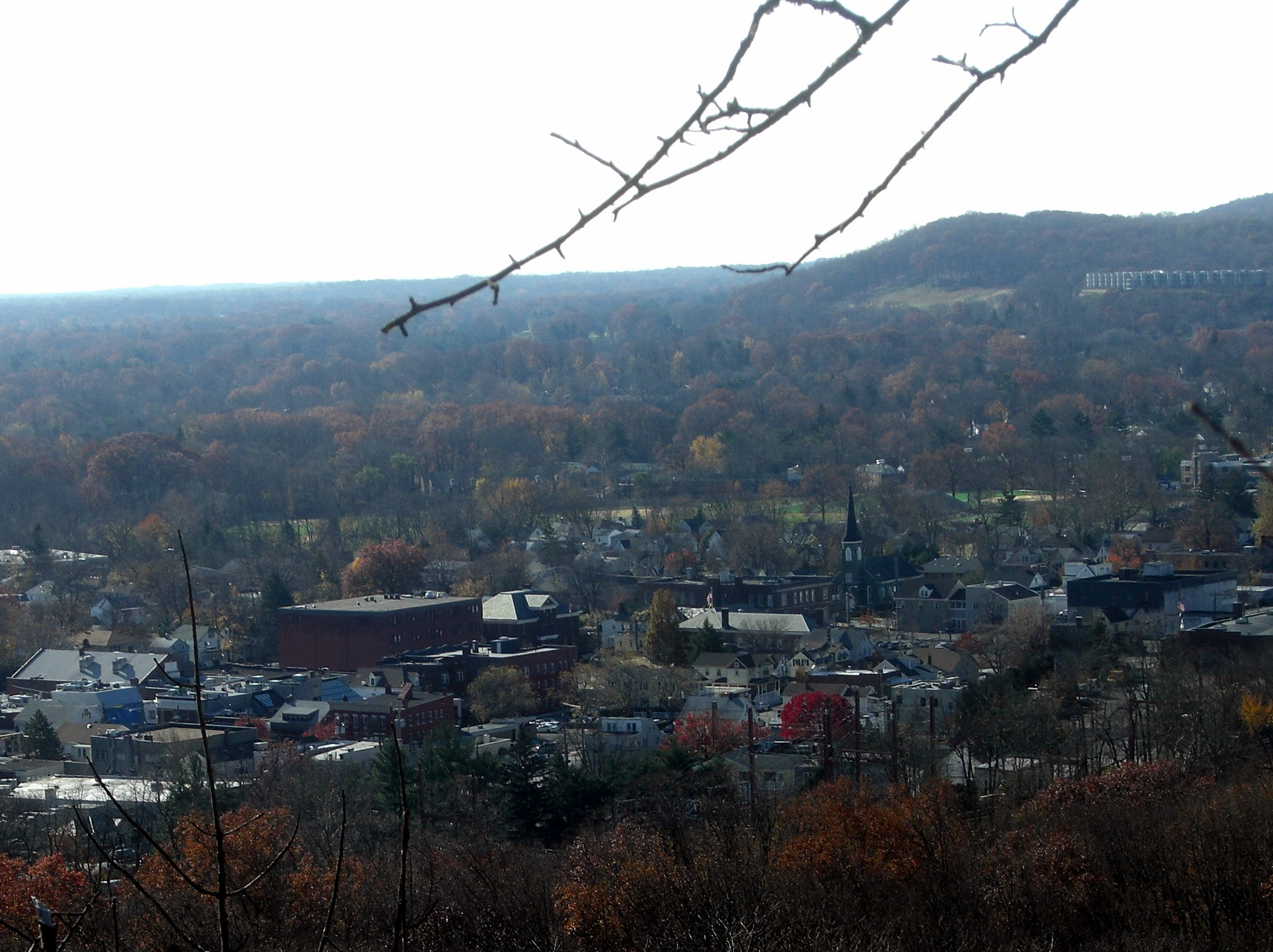
Millburn in Essex County

=== Etymology ===
The county is named after Essex, a county in the East of England.

=== History ===
Essex was originally formed as one of four administrative districts within Province of East Jersey in 1675, together with Bergen, Middlesex and Monmouth districts. Essex County was formed within East Jersey on March 7, 1683. The county was named after the English county of Essex. When the provinces of East Jersey and West Jersey were combined in 1702, the county boundaries were retained. Portions of Essex were taken in 1741 and transferred to Somerset County. In 1837, Passaic County was formed from portions of Essex and Bergen counties. In 1857, Union County was created from parts of Essex County.

=== Secession ===
The municipalities of western Essex County have discussed secession from the county, to create a new county or be annexed to Morris County, spurred mainly by a belief that tax policy benefits the poorer, urban, eastern portions of the county at the expense of the wealthier, more suburban municipalities in the west of the county. From 2001 to 2003, Millburn, Montclair and Roseland all held nonbinding ballot referendums on the issue. Then-Montclair mayor Robert J. Russo gave a statement in 2003 about secession, "I've watched Essex County burden our people, with very little to show for it. We're fiscally conservative here and socially progressive – and we're finally rebelling."

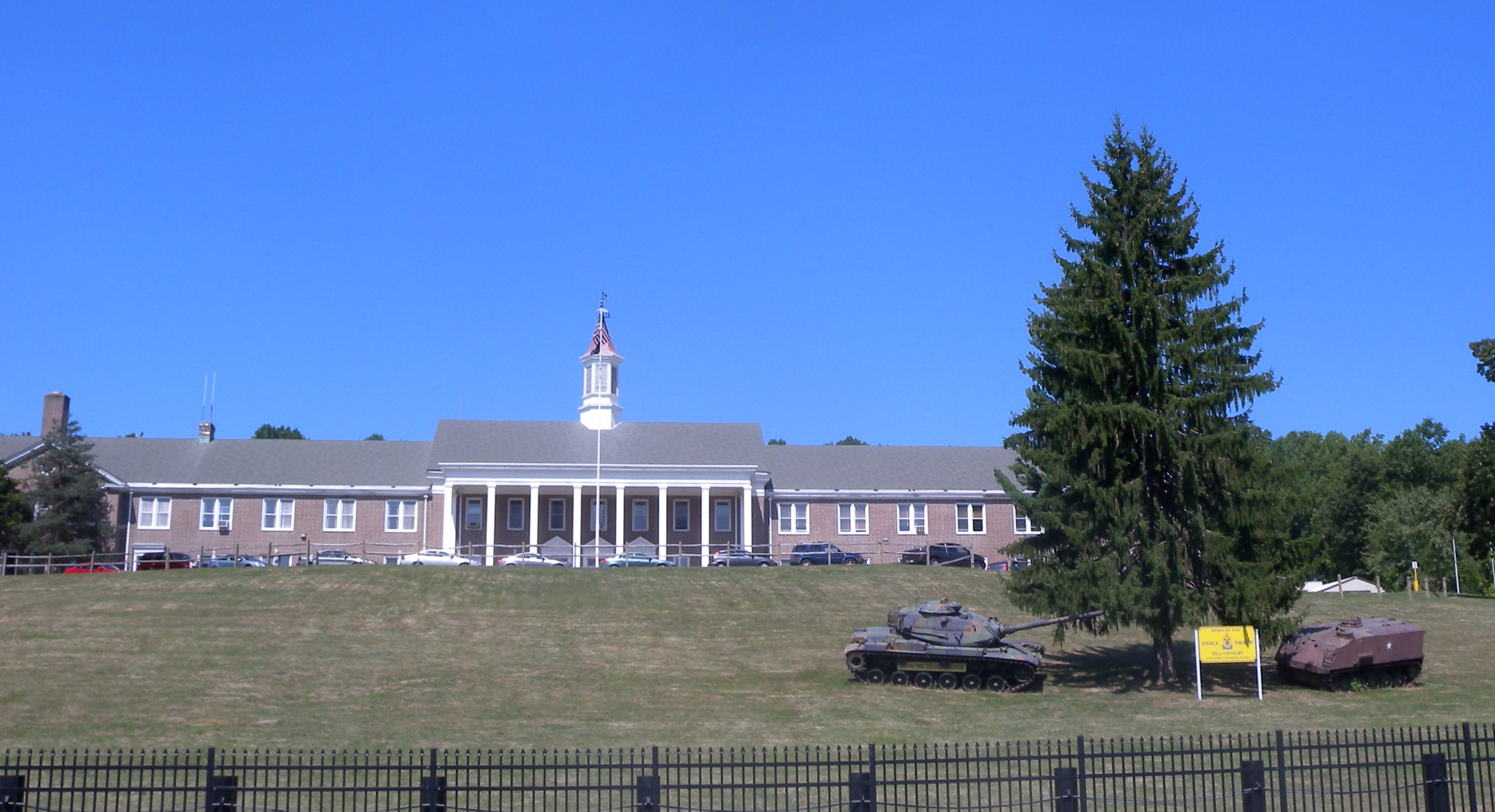
Essex Troop, New Jersey National Guard

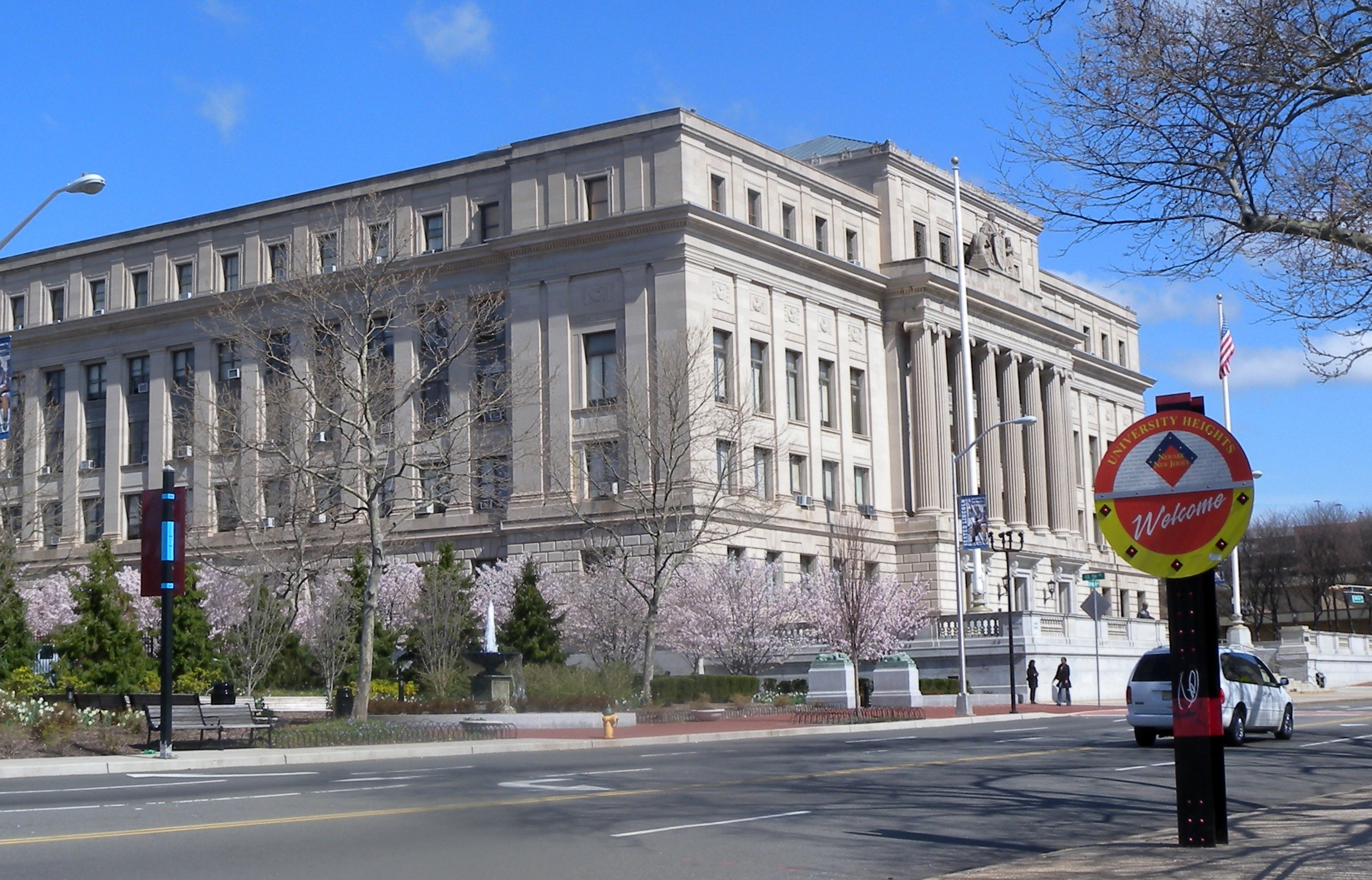
Essex County Hall of Records

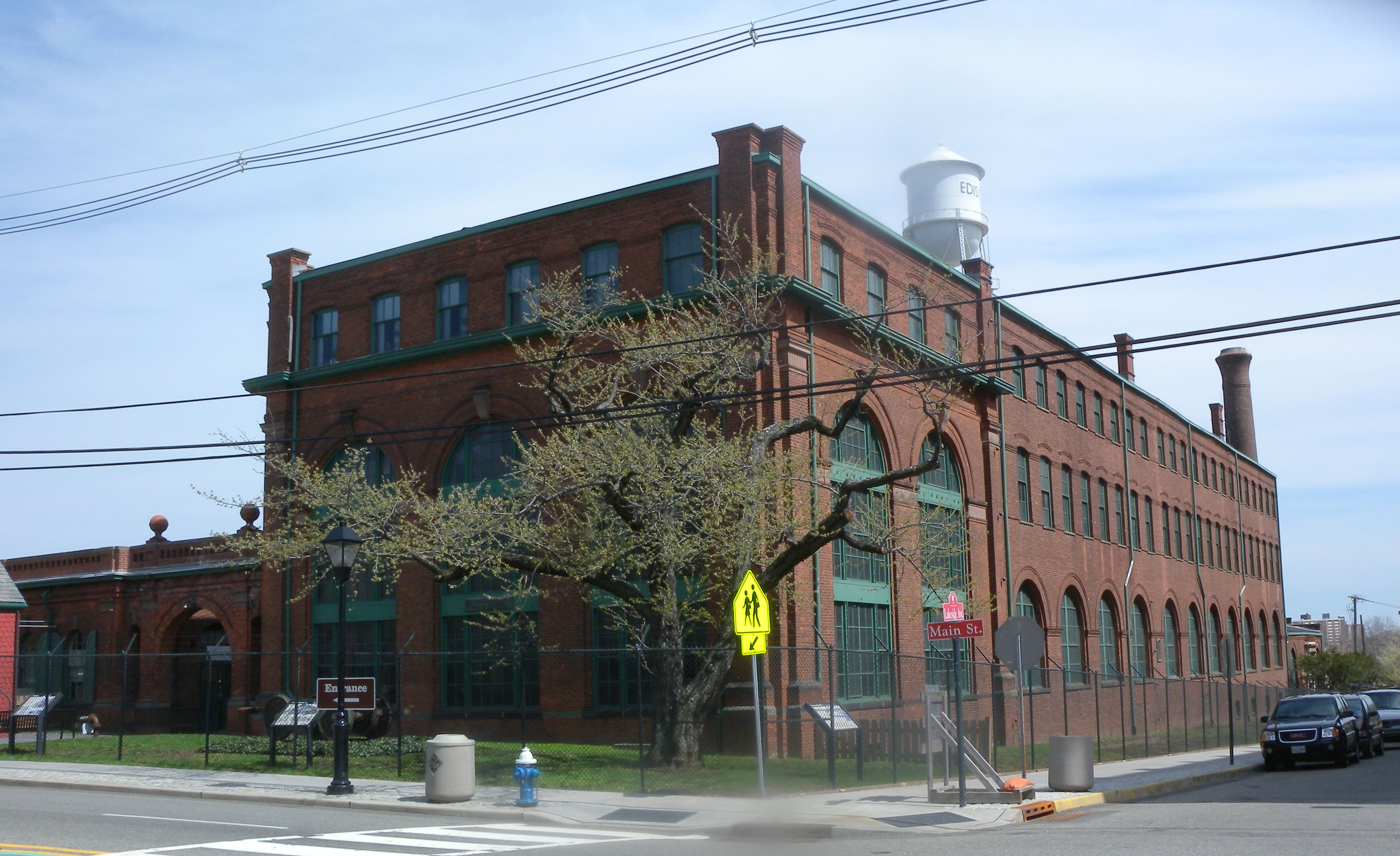
Thomas Edison Laboratory

== Geography ==
According to the U.S. Census Bureau, as of the 2020 Census, the county had a total area of 129.42 square miles (335.2 km^{2}), of which 126.09 square miles (326.6 km^{2}) was land (97.4%) and 3.34 square miles (8.7 km^{2}) was water (2.6%).

The county rises from generally flat in the east to the twin ridges of the Watchung Mountains in the western half, beyond which the land lowers again into the Passaic River valley.

The highest elevation is found at four areas scattered between Verona, North Caldwell, and Cedar Grove, reaching 660 feet (200 m) above sea level. The lowest point is sea level, at Newark Bay.

=== Climate ===
All of Essex County has a humid subtropical climate (Cfa) if the -3 °C isotherm is used. If the 0 °C isotherm is used, Cfa only exists in eastern Newark and the rest of the county has a hot-summer humid continental climate (Dfa). However temperatures do vary in various locations. In Newark, Eastern Essex County, and Southern/Southeastern Essex County, temperatures are relatively cool to hot, even in the winter months. Western Essex County has similar temperatures to Eastern Essex, but the elevation increase within the Watchung Mountains allows for some minor differences. An example would be that in January on Interstate 280 it could be raining in East Orange. Heading west on 280 there is a large hill that elevates from 150 to 650 feet (46 to 198 m), a 500 feet (150 m) difference. At the top of the hill it could be snowing because of the 3 to 4 degree temperature differences.

Newark, New Jersey

Climate chart (precipitation, max. and min. temperature)
J	F	M	A	M	J	J	A	S	O	N	D
3.5 39 24	2.9 42 27	4.1 51 34	4.2 62 44	4 72 53	4 82 63	4.7 86 69	3.7 84 68	3.8 77 60	3.6 65 48	3.6 55 39	3.8 44 30
- █ Average max. and min. temperatures in °F
- █ Precipitation totals in inches
- Source: The Weather Channel
Metric conversion
J	F	M	A	M	J	J	A	S	O	N	D
89 4 −4	74 6 −3	104 11 1	107 17 7	102 22 12	102 28 17	119 30 21	94 29 20	97 25 16	91 18 9	91 13 4	97 7 −1
- █ Average max. and min. temperatures in °C
- █ Precipitation totals in mm

In recent years, average temperatures in the county seat of Newark have ranged from a low of 24 °F (−4 °C) in January to a high of 86 °F (30 °C) in July, although a record low of −14 °F (−26 °C) was recorded in February 1934 and a record high of 108 °F (42 °C) was recorded on July 22, 2011, which is the highest temperature ever recorded in the state. Average monthly precipitation ranged from 2.99 inches (76 mm) in February to 4.76 inches (121 mm) in July. In Roseland, average monthly temperatures range from 29.2 °F (−1.6 °C) in January to 74.6 °F (23.7 °C) in July.

== Demographics ==
Historical population
Census	Pop.	Note	%±
1790	17,785		—
1800	22,269		25.2%
1810	25,984		16.7%
1820	30,793		18.5%
1830	41,911		36.1%
1840	44,621	*	6.5%
1850	73,950		65.7%
1860	98,877	*	33.7%
1870	143,839		45.5%
1880	189,929		32.0%
1890	256,098		34.8%
1900	359,053		40.2%
1910	512,886		42.8%
1920	652,089		27.1%
1930	833,513		27.8%
1940	837,340		0.5%
1950	905,949		8.2%
1960	923,545		1.9%
1970	932,526		1.0%
1980	851,116		−8.7%
1990	778,206		−8.6%
2000	793,633		2.0%
2010	783,969		−1.2%
2020	863,728		10.2%
2025 (est.)	896,379		3.8%
Historical sources: 1790–1990; 1970–2010 2000 2010 2020 * = Lost territory in previous decade.

Based on data from the 2010 census, Essex County is the 14th-most densely populated county in the United States, and was ranked New Jersey's second-most densely populated after Hudson County, which ranked sixth most-densely populated in the nation at 13,731.4 per square mile as of 2010. Newark, with a population density of 11,458.3 people per square mile, is the largest municipality in the county both in terms of land area (24.19 square miles) and population (277,140), while Caldwell is the smallest in terms of land area (1.17 square miles) and Essex Fells has the smallest population (2,113). Many of the county's smallest municipalities have population densities that are comparable to those of many big cities, and are well above the state's average which in turn is the highest in the nation.

Like many of the counties of Northern New Jersey near New York City, which tend to have sharp divides between relatively rich suburban neighborhoods and less wealthy, more densely populated cities nearby, the eastern region of Essex County tends to be poorer and more urbanized, while the western parts tend to be more affluent and suburban. The wide area of Eastern Essex has significant pockets of high population, high building density, high poverty, and high crime rates. Within this general area, however, are numerous areas composed of safe, mixed and middle-income neighborhoods of diverse populations. For example, north and west sides of Newark have well-kept suburban areas such as Vailsburg and Forest Hill. The east side of Newark is the Ironbound, a working-class Brazilian and Portuguese community. East Orange is home to the Presidential Estate neighborhood, a well-kept area of large, pre-war, single-family homes. Belleville and Bloomfield are suburbs with historic Italian communities that, in spite of retaining a core Italian-American population, now have many immigrants from Latin America and Asia. As of the 2000 Census, 36% of Nutley residents indicated that they were of Italian ancestry, the 12th-highest of any municipality in the nation and third-highest in New Jersey.

Beginning at about the turn of the 20th century, Essex County led the state in the rebuilding and rehab of its housing stock. In the 2000s, Newark led the state in the issuance of building permits. Many reasons were cited: citywide incentives to encourage construction development, an improving local economy, the rising demand of low-cost housing so close to Manhattan. Newark has since then become one of the fastest-growing cities in the entire Northeast, and reported a gain in median income and drop in poverty rate. This is a turnaround from the deterioration and abandonment experienced in the post-riot 1970s, 1980s and early part of the 1990s.

Crime in this part of the county has traditionally been among the highest in the state and the country as well, but recently has also seen significant declines, mirroring its large neighbor to the east, New York City. By 2006, crime in Newark had fallen 60% over the previous decade to its lowest levels in 40 years. Neighboring East Orange has also experienced a decline in crimes, dropping 50% in the three years (2005 to 2007). While crime rates have fallen significantly in these cities in recent years, they nonetheless remain high here compared to national crime statistics, as well as Irvington, and Orange. In 2008, Newark had 67 homicides, down from 105 in 2007 and the record of 161 murders set in 1981.

In contrast, Western Essex tends to be more suburban and affluent. Within this region are some of the most diverse and racially integrated municipalities in the state and nation, including Montclair, West Orange, South Orange and Maplewood. Many of these municipalities are well-known magnets for people moving from New York City, such as Glen Ridge, Montclair, Verona, Cedar Grove, South Orange and West Orange. The communities of Livingston, West Caldwell, South Orange, Maplewood, Millburn, North Caldwell, and Essex Fells are some of the wealthiest towns in the county. Short Hills (in Millburn), South Orange, West Orange, and Livingston have large Jewish communities. Short Hills has a popular upscale shopping mall, The Mall at Short Hills located near affluent communities in Morris and Union counties.

As the poorest place in the county, Newark has a median household income of $33,025 and a per capita income of $17,198; at the other extreme, Essex Fells, one of the wealthier places in the county and the 4th wealthiest municipality in the state, has a median household income of $174,432 and a per capita income of $89,316.

=== 2020 census ===
As of the 2020 census, the county had a population of 863,728 and a median age of 37.1 years. 23.4% of residents were under the age of 18 and 13.3% were 65 years of age or older. For every 100 females there were 92.6 males, and for every 100 females age 18 and over there were 89.5 males age 18 and over.

The racial makeup of the county was 30.3% White, 38.8% Black or African American, 0.5% American Indian and Alaska Native, 5.5% Asian, <0.1% Native Hawaiian and Pacific Islander, 14.4% from some other race, and 10.5% from two or more races. Hispanic or Latino residents of any race comprised 24.4% of the population.

100.0% of residents lived in urban areas, while <0.1% lived in rural areas.

There were 312,913 households in the county, of which 35.8% had children under the age of 18 living in them. Of all households, 38.8% were married-couple households, 19.7% were households with a male householder and no spouse or partner present, and 35.2% were households with a female householder and no spouse or partner present. About 28.0% of all households were made up of individuals and 10.0% had someone living alone who was 65 years of age or older.

There were 334,896 housing units, of which 6.6% were vacant. Among occupied housing units, 40.6% were owner-occupied and 59.4% were renter-occupied. The homeowner vacancy rate was 1.8% and the rental vacancy rate was 4.8%.

=== Racial and ethnic composition ===
The following table summarizes the county's racial and ethnic composition across recent decennial censuses.

Essex County, New Jersey – Racial and ethnic composition Note: the US Census treats Hispanic/Latino as an ethnic category. This table excludes Latinos from the racial categories and assigns them to a separate category. Hispanics/Latinos may be of any race.
Race / Ethnicity (NH = Non-Hispanic)	Pop 1980	Pop 1990	Pop 2000	Pop 2010	Pop 2020	% 1980	% 1990	% 2000	% 2010	% 2020
White alone (NH)	444,393	350,985	298,708	260,177	235,125	52.21%	45.10%	37.64%	33.19%	27.22%
Black or African American alone (NH)	312,188	305,786	319,883	308,358	324,081	36.68%	39.29%	40.31%	39.33%	37.52%
Native American or Alaska Native alone (NH)	1,050	1,382	1,111	1,509	1,238	0.12%	0.18%	0.14%	0.19%	0.14%
Asian alone (NH)	11,019	20,358	29,141	35,292	46,957	1.29%	2.62%	3.67%	4.50%	5.44%
Native Hawaiian or Pacific Islander alone (NH)	x	x	281	177	169	x	x	0.04%	0.02%	0.02%
Other race alone (NH)	5,882	1,918	3,828	6,121	12,078	0.69%	0.25%	0.48%	0.78%	1.40%
Mixed race or Multiracial (NH)	x	x	18,334	13,218	33,727	x	x	2.31%	1.69%	3.90%
Hispanic or Latino (any race)	76,584	97,777	122,347	159,117	210,353	9.00%	12.56%	15.42%	20.30%	24.35%
Total	851,116	778,206	793,633	783,969	863,728	100.00%	100.00%	100.00%	100.00%	100.00%

=== 2010 census ===
The 2010 United States census counted 783,969 people, 283,712 households, and 189,236 families in the county. The population density was 6,211.5 per square mile (2,398.3/km^{2}). There were 312,954 housing units at an average density of 2,479.6 per square mile (957.4/km^{2}). The racial makeup was 42.59% (333,868) White, 40.88% (320,479) Black or African American, 0.39% (3,056) Native American, 4.57% (35,789) Asian, 0.04% (286) Pacific Islander, 8.38% (65,687) from other races, and 3.16% (24,804) from two or more races. Hispanic or Latino of any race were 20.30% (159,117) of the population.

Of the 283,712 households, 33.2% had children under the age of 18; 40.1% were married couples living together; 20.6% had a female householder with no husband present and 33.3% were non-families. Of all households, 27.7% were made up of individuals and 9.4% had someone living alone who was 65 years of age or older. The average household size was 2.68 and the average family size was 3.29.

24.9% of the population were under the age of 18, 9.5% from 18 to 24, 28.6% from 25 to 44, 25.6% from 45 to 64, and 11.5% who were 65 years of age or older. The median age was 36.4 years. For every 100 females, the population had 92.1 males. For every 100 females ages 18 and older there were 88.6 males.

The non-Hispanic white population was 33.2%.

The county had 76,200 Jewish residents according to the 2002 results of the National Jewish Population Survey.

== Economy ==
The Bureau of Economic Analysis calculated that the county's gross domestic product was $48.7 billion in 2021, which was ranked fourth in the state and was a 6.5% increase from the prior year.

== Government ==
=== County government ===
The county seat of Essex County is Newark. Many offices and courts are concentrated at the Essex County Government Complex. Essex County is governed by the County Executive and the nine-member Board of County Commissioners, who administer all county business. Essex county joins Atlantic, Bergen, Hudson and Mercer counties as one of the 5 of 21 New Jersey counties with an elected executive. The County Executive is elected by a direct vote of the electorate. Nine commissioners are elected to serve three-year concurrent terms of office. Five of the commissioners represent districts; four are elected from the county on an at-large basis. At an annual organization meeting, the commissioners choose a Commissioner President and vice-president from among its members to serve one-year terms. In 2016, commissioners were paid $37,249 and the commissioner president was paid an annual salary of $38,211; commissioner salaries were the second-highest in the state, behind Hudson County. the county executive was paid $161,615 in 2015.

As of 2025, the Essex County Executive is Joseph N. DiVincenzo Jr. (D, Roseland), whose four-year term of office ends December 31, 2026. Essex County's Commissioners are (with terms for president and vice president ending every December 31):

District	Commissioner
1 - Newark's North and East Wards, parts of Central and West Wards	Robert Mercado (D, Newark, 2026)
2 - Irvington, Maplewood, Millburn and Newark's South Ward and parts of West Ward	A'Dorian Murray-Thomas (D, Newark, 2026)
3 - East Orange, Newark's West and Central Wards, Orange and South Orange	Vice President Tyshammie L. Cooper (D, East Orange, 2026)
4 - Caldwell, Cedar Grove, Essex Fells, Fairfield, Livingston, North Caldwell, Roseland, Verona, West Caldwell and West Orange	Leonard M. Luciano (D, West Caldwell, 2026)
5 - Belleville, Bloomfield, Glen Ridge, Montclair and Nutley	President Carlos M. Pomares (D, Bloomfield, 2026)
at large	Brendan W. Gill (D, Montclair, 2026)
at large	Romaine Graham (D, Irvington, 2026)
at large	Wayne Richardson (D, Newark, 2026)
at large	Patricia Sebold (D, Livingston, 2026)

In February 2019, Romaine Graham was appointed to fill the seat expiring in December 2024 that had been held by Lebby Jones until her death the previous month. Graham served on an interim basis until the November 2019 general election, when she was chosen to serve the balance of the term of office. No Republican has won countywide office since 1998, a commissioner seat since 2001, and an at-large commissioner seat since 1971.

Pursuant to Article VII Section II of the New Jersey State Constitution, each county in New Jersey is required to have three elected administrative officials known as "constitutional officers." These officers are the County Clerk and County Surrogate (both elected for five-year terms of office) and the County Sheriff (elected for a three-year term). Essex County is one of two counties statewide that has an elected Register of Deeds. Essex County's constitutional officers and register are:

Title	Representative
County Clerk	Christopher J. Durkin (D, West Caldwell, 2025)
Sheriff	Amir Jones (D, Newark, 2027)
Surrogate	Alturrick Kenney (D, Newark, 2028)
Register	Juan Rivera Jr. (D, Newark, 2029)

The Acting Essex County Prosecutor is Theodore N. Stephens II, who was appointed as acting prosecutor in September 2018. Stephens previously served as Essex County Surrogate from 2012 until his appointment as Acting Prosecutor. Essex County constitutes Vicinage 5 of the New Jersey Superior Court, which is seated at the Veterans' Courthouse in Newark, which also houses the Criminal Part; civil and probate cases are heard at both the historic Essex County Courthouse and at the Essex County Hall of Records, also in Newark, while family and chancery cases are heard at the Robert N. Wilentz Court Complex, also in Newark, with additional facilities in East Orange. The Assignment Judge for the vicinage is Sallyanne Floria.

=== Federal representatives ===
Three federal Congressional Districts cover the county, including portions of the 8th, 10th and 11th Districts. For the 119th United States Congress, New Jersey's 8th congressional district is represented by Rob Menendez (D, Jersey City). For the 119th United States Congress, New Jersey's 10th congressional district is represented by LaMonica McIver (D, Newark). For the 119th United States Congress, New Jersey's 11th congressional district is represented by Analilia Mejia (D, Glen Ridge) who was elected in a 2026 special election to serve for the remainder of the Congress following the resignation Mikie Sherrill (D, Montclair), who was elected Governor of New Jersey in 2025.

=== State representatives ===
The 22 municipalities of Essex County are represented by five separate legislative districts.

District	Senator	Assembly	Municipalities
27th	John F. McKeon (D)	Rosaura Bagoile (D) Alixon Collazos-Gill (D)	Livingston, Millburn, Montclair, Roseland, and West Orange. The remainder of this district covers portions of Passaic County.
28th	Renee Burgess (D)	Chigozie Onyema (D) Cleopatra Tucker (D)	Irvington, Maplewood, South Orange, and a portion of Newark. The remainder of this district covers portions of Union County.
29th	Teresa Ruiz (D)	Eliana Pintor Marin (D) Shanique Speight (D)	A portion of Newark. The remainder of this district covers portions of Hudson County.
34th	Britnee Timberlake (D)	Carmen Morales (D) Michael Venezia (D)	Belleville, Bloomfield, East Orange, Glen Ridge, Nutley, and Orange.
40th	Kristin Corrado (R)	Al Barlas (R) Christopher DePhillips (R)	Caldwell, Cedar Grove, Essex Fells, Fairfield, North Caldwell, Verona, and West Caldwell. The remainder of this district covers portions of Bergen County and Passaic County.

=== Law enforcement ===
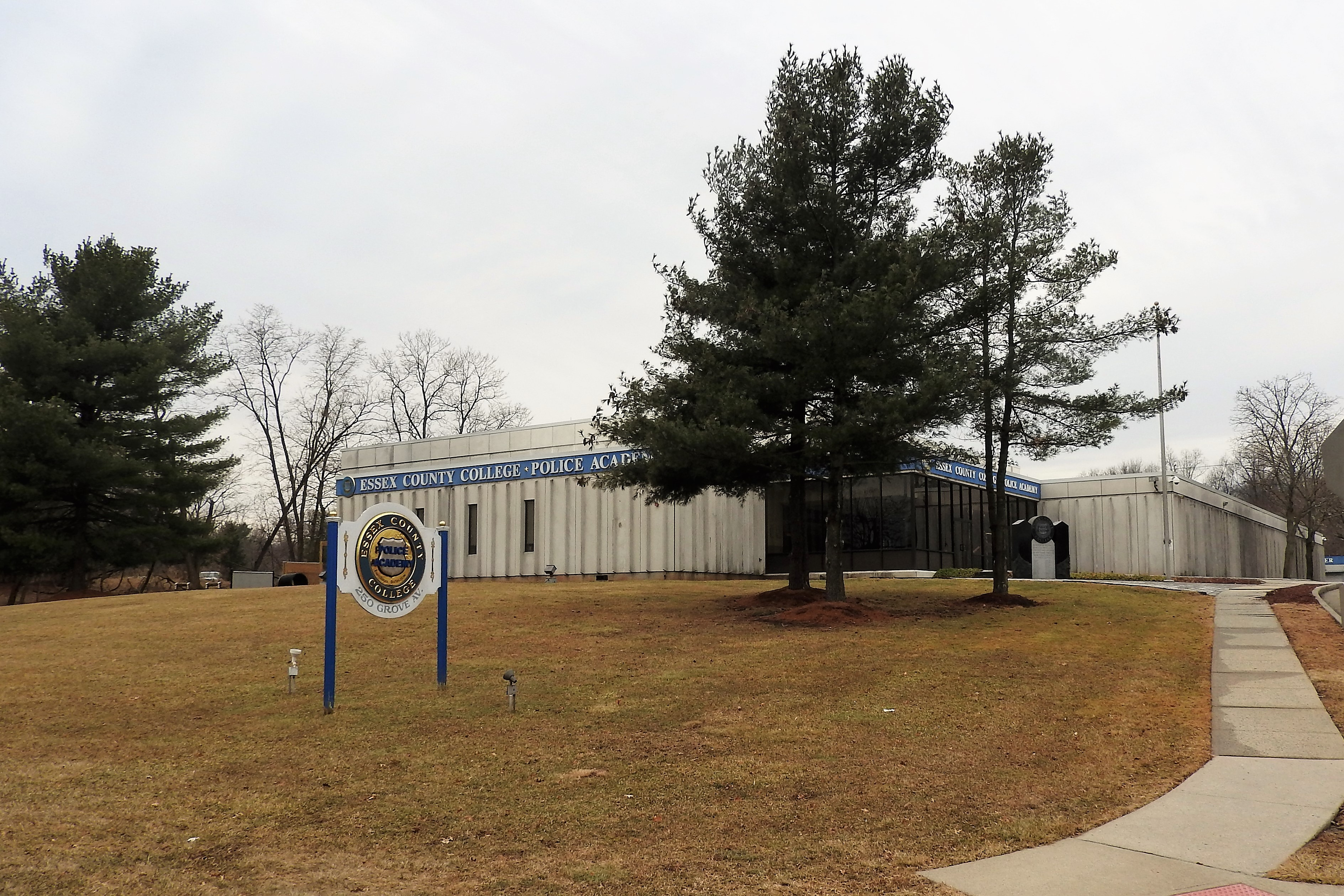
Essex County Police Academy

Law enforcement at the county level is provided by the Essex County Prosecutor's Office and the Essex County Sheriff's Office. The Essex County Police was completely absorbed by the sheriff's office by 2007. Essex County College and its satellite locations are patrolled by the Essex County College Police Department.

In 2021, the Essex County Correctional Facility in Newark ended its contract with U.S. Immigration and Customs Enforcement to hold undocumented immigrants, instead entering into a contract with Union County, New Jersey, to house their inmates.

== Politics ==
United States presidential election results for Essex County, New Jersey
Year	Republican		Democratic		Third party(ies)	
Year	No.	%	No.	%	No.	%
1896	42,587	64.99%	20,509	31.30%	2,429	3.71%
1900	45,316	61.83%	25,731	35.11%	2,241	3.06%
1904	50,508	62.74%	25,452	31.61%	4,550	5.65%
1908	53,688	61.71%	30,192	34.70%	3,127	3.59%
1912	16,994	21.08%	26,250	32.57%	37,357	46.35%
1916	54,167	59.24%	34,596	37.84%	2,676	2.93%
1920	116,168	70.90%	40,970	25.00%	6,710	4.10%
1924	123,614	66.22%	41,708	22.34%	21,351	11.44%
1928	168,856	58.53%	118,268	40.99%	1,390	0.48%
1932	149,630	51.46%	132,666	45.63%	8,476	2.91%
1936	140,991	44.14%	174,857	54.74%	3,593	1.12%
1940	182,124	52.94%	154,363	44.87%	7,547	2.19%
1944	178,989	49.62%	174,320	48.32%	7,433	2.06%
1948	166,963	48.60%	155,468	45.25%	21,136	6.15%
1952	219,863	53.94%	180,501	44.28%	7,271	1.78%
1956	234,682	60.45%	146,313	37.68%	7,258	1.87%
1960	167,848	42.64%	217,878	55.35%	7,897	2.01%
1964	116,172	29.30%	277,042	69.88%	3,263	0.82%
1968	140,084	39.23%	185,440	51.93%	31,571	8.84%
1972	170,036	50.17%	161,270	47.59%	7,582	2.24%
1976	133,911	42.40%	174,434	55.23%	7,467	2.36%
1980	117,222	40.82%	145,281	50.59%	24,663	8.59%
1984	136,798	43.49%	173,295	55.09%	4,450	1.41%
1988	111,491	40.25%	156,098	56.36%	9,378	3.39%
1992	89,146	32.20%	158,130	57.12%	29,582	10.68%
1996	65,162	25.63%	175,368	68.99%	13,666	5.38%
2000	66,842	25.75%	185,505	71.47%	7,226	2.78%
2004	83,374	28.81%	203,681	70.39%	2,293	0.79%
2008	74,063	23.40%	240,306	75.91%	2,181	0.69%
2012	64,767	21.30%	237,035	77.95%	2,269	0.75%
2016	63,176	20.19%	240,837	76.97%	8,871	2.84%
2020	75,475	21.86%	266,820	77.27%	3,016	0.87%
2024	83,908	26.78%	224,596	71.69%	4,779	1.53%

In presidential elections, the county has long been Democratic and is the most Democratic county in the state. It was the only county in the state to be won by Walter Mondale in 1984, and voted Democratic all but once since 1960. Democrats have won every presidential election in the 21st century with over 70% of the vote and Republicans have not won the county in a statewide contest since the 1985 gubernatorial election. As of October 1, 2021, there were a total of 571,960 registered voters in Essex County, of whom 299,613 (52.4%) were registered as Democrats, 58,618 (10.2%) were registered as Republicans and 208,422 (36.4%) were registered as unaffiliated. There were 5,307 voters (0.9%) registered to other parties.

Senate Class 1 election results

United States Senate election results for Essex County, New Jersey1
Year	Republican		Democratic		Third party(ies)	
Year	No.	%	No.	%	No.	%
2024	75,420	25.15%	216,580	72.22%	7,887	2.63%
2018	53,537	21.11%	194,068	76.52%	6,028	2.38%
2012	53,009	19.59%	213,404	78.86%	4,211	1.56%
2006	45,266	26.57%	122,751	72.06%	2,333	1.37%
2000	73,757	29.53%	170,756	68.36%	5,263	2.11%
1994	60,671	35.51%	107,082	62.67%	3,116	1.82%
1988	85,169	32.43%	170,591	64.96%	6,855	2.61%
1982	79,654	38.10%	126,766	60.63%	2,672	1.28%

Senate Class 2 election results

United States Senate election results for Essex County, New Jersey2
Year	Republican		Democratic		Third party(ies)	
Year	No.	%	No.	%	No.	%
2020	69,750	20.82%	260,604	77.78%	4,715	1.41%
2014	29,527	21.40%	106,472	77.17%	1,975	1.43%
2013	24,929	20.99%	92,384	77.78%	1,460	1.23%
2008	61,829	23.35%	198,623	75.01%	4,348	1.64%
2002	44,072	27.33%	114,624	71.09%	2,541	1.58%
1996	68,286	28.86%	160,714	67.92%	7,608	3.22%
1990	56,722	37.24%	93,052	61.09%	2,539	1.67%
1984	76,179	25.43%	219,902	73.40%	3,530	1.18%

=== State elections ===
Governor election results

Gubernatorial election results for Essex County, New Jersey
Year	Republican		Democratic		Third party(ies)	
Year	No.	%	No.	%	No.	%
2025	55,503	22.63%	188,681	76.92%	1,118	0.46%
2021	45,542	25.42%	132,520	73.96%	1,105	0.62%
2017	30,633	18.83%	129,470	79.58%	2,598	1.60%
2013	57,353	37.05%	95,747	61.85%	1,705	1.10%
2009	50,240	27.53%	122,640	67.21%	9,597	5.26%
2005	45,789	25.36%	131,312	72.73%	3,456	1.91%
2001	48,540	26.96%	129,406	71.88%	2,083	1.16%
1997	69,470	35.32%	120,429	61.23%	6,778	3.45%
1993	78,824	39.58%	116,891	58.69%	3,436	1.73%
1989	57,206	29.91%	131,835	68.93%	2,206	1.15%
1985	121,685	66.95%	56,694	31.19%	3,383	1.86%
1981	92,185	41.09%	129,969	57.94%	2,169	0.97%
1977	83,409	40.13%	120,576	58.01%	3,853	1.85%
1973	68,223	28.98%	162,989	69.23%	4,211	1.79%
1969	147,188	51.76%	131,479	46.24%	5,681	2.00%
1965	109,081	37.14%	178,830	60.88%	5,830	1.98%
1961	135,342	46.07%	156,033	53.11%	2,418	0.82%
1957	127,436	43.31%	160,887	54.68%	5,934	2.02%
1953	127,782	45.89%	141,996	50.99%	8,692	3.12%

== Education ==
=== Higher education ===
Essex County has five public and four private institutions. Another private college closed in 1995, and Bloomfield College was absorbed into Montclair State University in July 2023.

Public

- Essex County College – a two-year community college that offers A.A., A.S., and A.A.S. degrees, the school opened in 1968. The school's main campus is in the University Heights section of Newark, with a satellite campus in West Caldwell.
- Montclair State University – founded in 1908, the school serves more than 20,000 students at its campus covering Montclair, Little Falls and Clifton.
- New Jersey Institute of Technology (NJIT) – located in Newark's University Heights section, the school was established in 1881 as Newark Technical School, the school has a total enrollment of 11,400 undergraduate and graduate students.
- Rutgers University–Newark – the school has an enrollment of 12,000 and dates back to the 1908 establishment of the New Jersey Law School which became a part of Rutgers University under legislation that incorporated the University of Newark into Rutgers.
- New Jersey Medical School – dates back to its establishment in Newark in 1956 as the Seton Hall College of Medicine and Dentistry of New Jersey, and became part of Rutgers University in 2013.

Private

- Berkeley College – Newark
- Caldwell University – founded in 1939 as a Catholic liberal arts college by the Sisters of Saint Dominic, the school has 2,200 students at its campus in Caldwell.
- Seton Hall University –founded in 1856 and affiliated with the Roman Catholic Archdiocese of Newark, the school has more than 10,000 students enrolled on its campus in South Orange.
- Seton Hall University School of Law – located in Newark, it is the state's only private law school.
- Upsala College (defunct) – founded in 1893, the school moved in 1924 to East Orange and closed in 1995. It is now the site of East Orange Campus High School, which opened in 2002.

=== School districts ===
School districts in Essex County include:

K–12

- Belleville School District
- Bloomfield Public Schools
- Caldwell-West Caldwell Public Schools – Consolidated
- Cedar Grove Schools
- East Orange School District
- Essex County Vocational Technical Schools
- Glen Ridge Public Schools
- Irvington Public Schools
- Livingston Public Schools
- Millburn Township Public Schools
- Montclair Public Schools
- Newark Public Schools
- Nutley Public Schools
- Orange Board of Education
- South Orange-Maplewood School District – Consolidated
- Verona Public Schools
- West Orange Public Schools

Secondary

- West Essex Regional School District

Elementary

- Essex Fells School District
- Fairfield School District
- North Caldwell Public Schools
- Roseland School District

== Transportation ==
=== Roads and highways ===
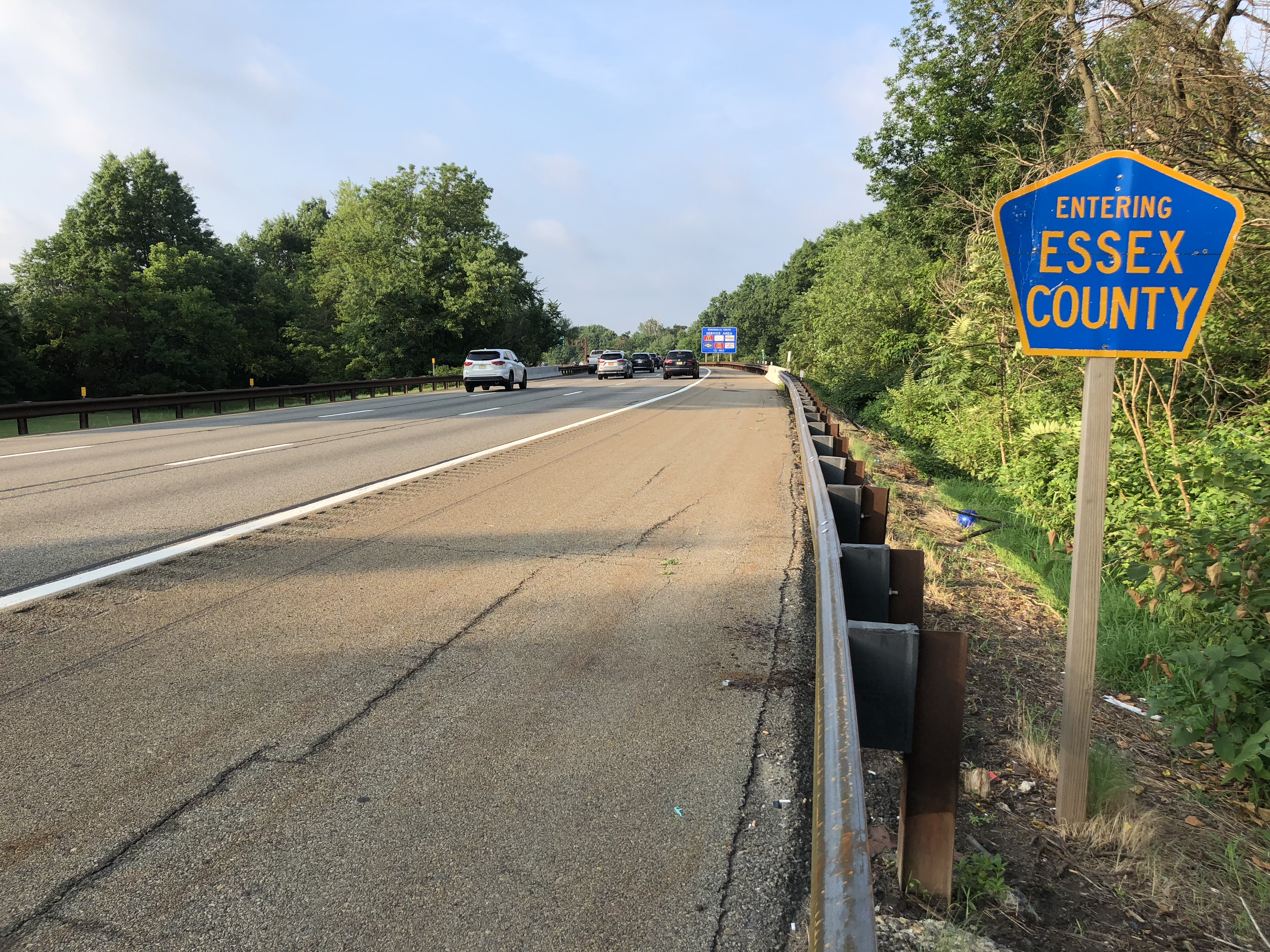
Garden State Parkway South entering Essex County

As of 2010, the county had a total of 1,667.98 miles (2,684.35 km) of roadways, of which 1,375.06 miles (2,212.94 km) are maintained by the local municipality, 213.12 miles (342.98 km) by Essex County and 60.68 miles (97.65 km) by the New Jersey Department of Transportation and 19.12 miles (30.77 km) by the New Jersey Turnpike Authority.

Essex County is traversed by a number of highways. Three primary interstates and one auxiliary cross the county. This includes two long distance main interstates, one north–south Interstate 95 (concurrent with the New Jersey Turnpike toll road) and one east–west Interstate 80. East-West Interstate 78 also crosses the county. All of these only have interchanges in one municipality in the county, Newark for I-95 and I-78 and Fairfield for I-80. Interstate 280 passes through the county in a northeast–southwest direction and has exits in Roseland, Livingston, West Orange, Orange, East Orange and Newark, making it one of the most important roads for intracounty travel.

Essex County also has four U.S. Routes that cross it. Route 1/9 are concurrent and a freeway throughout their length in the county. They pass through Newark from Elizabeth in Union County to Kearny in Hudson County. It crosses over the Passaic River on the Pulaski Skyway, which bans trucks, so just before it leaves the county in the north Truck 1/9 splits for the traffic that is not allowed on the bridge. Truck 1/9 is also a freeway its entire length in the county. U.S. Route 22 eastern terminus is in Newark the only municipality it crosses in the county. It is a freeway along it route in Essex County. It connects Newark with points to the east. The last U.S. Route in the county is U.S. Route 46, which passes through Fairfield, where it is a major commercial road that parallels Interstate 80.

The most important state road in the county is the Garden State Parkway which passes north–south through the county, connecting Union Township in the south in Union County to Clifton in the north in Passaic County. It is a toll road, a freeway, and bans trucks of more than 7,000 pounds during its entire length in the county. It has one interchange in Irvington, one in Newark, two in East Orange, and four in Bloomfield. Outside the county, it is the longest road of any kind in the state.

New Jersey Route 7 is a major arterial road in Nutley and Belleville. It has two discontinuous sections. The southern section starts at an overpass for Route 21 and passes over the Belleville Turnpike Bridge into border between Hudson and Bergen counties. The northern section starts at the Newark/Belleville border passes through Belleville and Nutley until in crosses into Clifton.

Other highways in the county include:

- Route 10
- Route 21
- Route 23
- Route 24 (Only in Millburn)
- Route 27 (only in Newark)
- Route 124
- Route 159 (Only in Fairfield)
- Eisenhower Parkway

=== Buses ===
There are many buses that operate around the county, with NJ Transit (NJT) headquarters located just behind Newark Penn Station, a transit hub in the eastern part of the county. There are two major bus terminals in the county, Newark Penn Station and the Irvington Bus Terminal. Community Coach, and OurBus operate buses from Essex County to the Port Authority Bus Terminal in New York City. Some of the NJ Transit bus lines follow former streetcar lines.

=== Rail ===
Essex County has a large rail network, but most train service is geared toward the heavily utilized Newark/New York City commute. All of the passenger rail lines in the county are electrified, although many trains that continue on to non-electrified lines use dual-mode or diesel push-pull locomotives.

==== Commuter rail ====
NJ Transit has five lines that make stops in the county. All of them stop at either Newark Penn Station or Newark Broad Street station. The Northeast Corridor Line from Trenton with connections from Philadelphia's 30th Street Station, Camden, and Princeton has stops at Newark Airport and Newark Penn Stations before continuing to Secaucus Junction and New York Penn Station. The North Jersey Coast Line from Bay Head or Long Branch also stops at Newark Airport and Newark Penn Stations before continuing to Secaucus Junction and New York Penn Station or Hoboken Terminal. The Raritan Valley Line from High Bridge usually terminates in Newark Penn Station, but mid-day trains continue to New York and one eastbound morning train terminates at Hoboken Terminal.

The Montclair-Boonton Line from Hackettstown or Little Falls has six stations in Montclair, one in Glen Ridge, and two in Bloomfield before reaching Newark Broad Street Station and continuing to Secaucus Junction and New York Penn Station or Hoboken Terminal. The Morris and Essex Lines from Hackettstown and Peapack-Gladstone has two stops in Millburn, one in Maplewood, and two each in South Orange, Orange and East Orange before reaching Newark Broad Street and continuing to Secaucus Junction and New York Penn Station or Hoboken Terminal.

==== Light rail ====
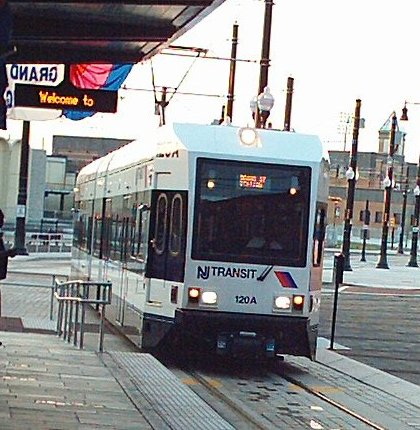
Broad Street station of Newark Light Rail

The Newark Light Rail is completely contained within the county. It has 17 stations in Newark, Belleville, and Bloomfield and also operates out of Newark Penn Station. It is composed of two lines: the Newark City Subway and the Broad Street Extension.

The Newark City Subway is the only survivor of the many street car lines that once crossed New Jersey, although it no longer uses street cars. It survived in part because it does not include street running, instead following the abandoned Morris Canal right of way before going underground. It has one station in Bloomfield and one in Belleville on the old Orange Branch of the New York & Greenwood Lake Service of the Erie Railroad before entering Newark and turning onto the Morris Canal right of way. From there it follows Branch Brook Park before turning into downtown Newark as a subway. It has nine stops in Newark before terminating in Newark Penn Station.

The Broad Street Extension was built to provide connections between Newark Penn Station and Newark Broad Street Station and service to the waterfront of Newark. Leaving Penn Station, the line comes up from the subway and runs on streets or at grade for most of its length. It stops at NJPAC/Center Street, Atlantic Street, and Riverfront Stadium before reaching Broad Street Station. From Broad Street it takes a different route stopping at Washington Park and NJPAC/Center Street before arriving at Penn Station.

==== Rapid transit ====
The PATH also operates out of New York Penn Station. It has direct service to Harrison, Jersey City, and Lower Manhattan. With a free transfer, the PATH also provides service to Hoboken, as well as Greenwich Village, Chelsea, and Midtown Manhattan.

==== Intercity rail ====
Amtrak has two stations in the county, Newark Penn Station and Newark Airport, both on the Northeast Corridor. Newark Penn Station has service on the only high speed train in the Western Hemisphere, the Acela Express, to Boston, Philadelphia, Baltimore, and Washington, D.C. Newark Penn Station also offers services on the Cardinal to Chicago; Carolinian to Charlotte; Crescent to New Orleans; Keystone Service to Harrisburg; Palmetto to Charleston; Pennsylvanian to Pittsburgh; Northeast Regional to Newport News, Norfolk, and Lynchburg; Silver Star and Silver Meteor to Miami; and Vermonter to St. Albans all with intermediate stops. Newark Airport is served by Northeast Regional and Keystone Service trains.

==== Monorail ====
Newark Liberty International Airport has a monorail called AirTrain Newark that connects the terminals, four parking areas, and the Newark Liberty International Airport Station on the Northeast Corridor. The monorail is free except for service to and from the train station.

=== Airports ===
Newark Liberty International Airport is a major commercial airport located in the southeast section of the county in Newark and Elizabeth in Union County. It is one of the New York Metropolitan airports operated by Port Authority of New York and New Jersey. It is a hub for United Airlines. It is also a leading cargo airport and is a hub for FedEx Express and Kalitta Air.

The Essex County Airport in Fairfield is a general aviation airport.

=== Ports ===
Port Newark-Elizabeth Marine Terminal is a major component of the Port of New York and New Jersey. Located on the Newark Bay it serves as the principal container ship facility for goods entering and leaving New York-Newark metropolitan area, and the northeastern quadrant of North America. It consists of two components – Port Newark and the Elizabeth Marine Terminal (sometimes called "Port Elizabeth") – which exist side by side and are run conjointly by the Port Authority of New York and New Jersey. The facility is located within the boundaries of the two cities of Newark and Elizabeth, just east of the New Jersey Turnpike and Newark Liberty International Airport.

=== Bridges ===
Several important or noteworthy bridges currently or historically exist at least partially in the county. Most of them cross Newark Bay or the Passaic River into Hudson or Bergen counties. The Newark Bay Bridge carries Interstate 78 over Newark Bay from Newark to Bayonne and is currently the most southern bridge crossing the bay. The Upper Bay Bridge, a vertical-lift bridge located just north of the Newark Bay Bridge, carries a freight train line over the bay from Newark to Bayonne.

The PD Draw is an abandoned and partially dismantled railroad bridge across the Passaic River from Newark to Kearny. The Lincoln Highway Passaic River Bridge carries Truck 1/9 across the Passaic River and is currently the southernmost crossing of the river before it reaches the bay. It is a vertical-lift bridge and was the route that the Lincoln Highway used to cross the river. The Pulaski Skyway, the most famous bridge entirely in New Jersey, carries Route 1/9 across the Passaic River, Kearny Point, and the Hackensack River from Newark through Kearny to Jersey City.

The Point-No-Point Bridge is a railroad swing bridge that carries a freight line across the Passaic River between Newark and Kearny. The Jackson Street Bridge is a historic vehicular swing bridge across the Passaic from Newark to Harrison. The Dock Bridge, listed on the National Register of Historic Places carries four tracks of the Northeast Corridor rail line and two tracks of the PATH on two vertical lift spans from Newark Penn Station to Harrison.

The Center Street Bridge is a former railroad, rapid transit, and road bridge connecting Newark and Harrison. The Bridge Street Bridge is another vehicular swing bridge across the Passaic from Newark to Harrison, as is the Clay Street Bridge, a swing bridge that connects Newark and East Newark.

== Park and recreation ==
Essex County was the first county in the country to create a county park system (Essex County Park System), to ensure that it did not lose all its land to development.

== Municipalities ==
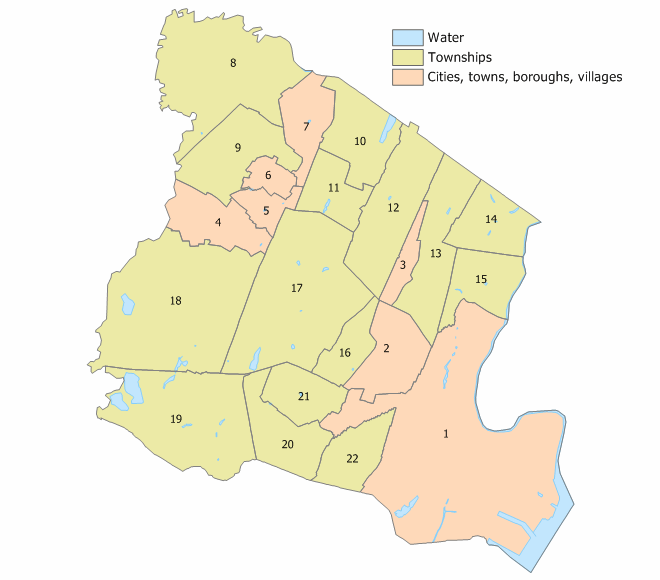
Index map of Essex County municipalities (click to see index key)

Interactive map of municipalities in Essex County.

The 22 municipalities in Essex County (with 2010 Census data for population, housing units and area in square miles) are: Other, unincorporated communities in the county are listed next to their parent municipality. Most of these areas are census-designated places that have been created by the United States Census Bureau for enumeration purposes within a Township. Other communities and enclaves that exist within a municipality are marked as non-CDP next to the name.

Municipality	Map key	Municipal type	Population	Housing units	Total area	Water area	Land area	Pop. density	Housing density	School district	Unincorporated communities
Belleville	15	township	38,222	14,327	3.40	0.06	3.34	10,755.7	4,289.3	Belleville	Silver Lake CDP (part; 3,769)
Bloomfield	13	township	53,105	19,470	5.33	0.02	5.30	8,920.5	3,670.7	Bloomfield	Ampere North CDP (5,132); Brookdale CDP (9,854); Silver Lake CDP (part; 474); Watsessing CDP (8,078)
Caldwell	6	borough	9,027	3,510	1.17	0.00	1.17	6,710.3	3,011.1	Caldwell-West Caldwell	
Cedar Grove	10	township	12,980	4,661	4.38	0.13	4.25	2,918.6	1,096.1	Cedar Grove	
East Orange	2	city	69,612	28,803	3.92	0.00	3.92	16,377.1	7,339.5	East Orange	
Essex Fells	5	borough	2,244	758	1.42	0.01	1.41	1,496.3	536.8	West Essex (7–12); Essex Fells (PK–6)	
Fairfield	8	township	7,872	2,723	10.46	0.16	10.30	725.1	264.5	West Essex (7–12); Fairfield (PK–6)	
Glen Ridge	3	borough	7,802	2,541	1.29	0.00	1.28	5,872.8	1,982.6	Glen Ridge	
Irvington	22	township	61,176	23,196	2.93	0.00	2.93	18,417.0	7,922.0	Irvington	
Livingston	18	township	31,330	10,284	14.08	0.31	13.77	2,132.8	746.9	Livingston	
Maplewood	20	township	25,684	8,608	3.88	0.00	3.88	6,155.3	2,220.0	South Orange-Maplewood	
Millburn	19	township	21,710	7,106	9.88	0.55	9.32	2,161.3	762.2	Millburn Township	Short Hills CDP (14,422)
Montclair	12	township	40,921	15,911	6.32	0.01	6.31	5,971.2	2,522.2	Montclair	Upper Montclair CDP (13,146)
Newark	1	city	311,549	109,520	26.11	1.92	24.19	11,458.3	4,528.1	Newark	
North Caldwell	7	borough	6,694	2,134	3.02	0.00	3.01	2,053.2	708.6	West Essex (7–12); North Caldwell (PK–6)	
Nutley	14	township	30,143	11,789	3.43	0.04	3.38	8,384.1	3,484.0	Nutley	
Orange	16	township	34,447	12,222	2.20	0.00	2.20	13,705.7	5,558.9	Orange	
Roseland	4	borough	6,299	2,432	3.56	0.02	3.54	1,644.4	687.3	West Essex (7–12); Roseland (PK–6)	
South Orange	21	village	18,484	5,815	2.86	0.00	2.86	5,672.8	2,036.5	South Orange-Maplewood	
Verona	11	township	14,572	5,523	2.78	0.02	2.76	4,838.4	2,004.4	Verona	
West Caldwell	9	township	11,012	4,009	5.07	0.01	5.05	2,128.5	793.1	Caldwell-West Caldwell	
West Orange	17	township	48,843	17,612	12.17	0.13	12.05	3,836.0	1,462.1	West Orange	Llewellyn Park CDP (821); Pleasantdale CDP (2,329)
Essex County		county	863,728	312,954	129.63	3.42	126.21	6,211.5	2,479.6		

=== Other communities ===
- Montclair State University CDP (part; 2,180)

== Points of interest ==
Essex County was the first county in the United States to have its own parks department. It is called the Essex County Park System.

- Anderson Park Montclair
- Becker Park, Roseland
- Branch Brook Park, Newark / Belleville (the country's oldest county park)
- Brookdale Park, Montclair / Bloomfield
- Crane House Site Boulder Monument, corner of Valley Road and Claremont Ave, Montclair; formerly the smallest park in the world, now #2.
- Eagle Rock Reservation, West Orange / Montclair
- Glenfield Park, Montclair / Glen Ridge
- Grover Cleveland Park, Caldwell / Essex Fells
- Hilltop Reservation, Caldwell / Cedar Grove / North Caldwell / Verona
- Irvington Park, Irvington
- Ivy Hill Park, Newark
- Kip's Castle Park, Verona / Montclair
- Mills Reservation, Cedar Grove / Upper Montclair
- Orange Park, Orange / East Orange
- South Mountain Reservation, West Orange / South Orange / Millburn / Maplewood
- Vailsburg Park, Newark
- Thomas Edison National Historical Park, West Orange
- Verona Park, Verona
- Watsessing Park, Bloomfield / East Orange
- Weequahic Park, Newark
- West Essex Park, West Caldwell / Roseland
- West Side Park, Newark
- Yanticaw Park, Nutley
- Prudential Center, Newark. Opened in 2007, home of the New Jersey Devils of the National Hockey League and the Seton Hall University men's basketball team. It was formerly the home of the New Jersey Nets from 2010 until 2012.
- The Mall at Short Hills, Short Hills, Milburn. Opened in 1961, is 10 miles west from Newark Liberty International Airport.
- Livingston Mall, Livingston.
- Christ Church Cemetery & Mausoleum, Belleville. This cemetery was originally the first Episcopal Church in the area, established in 1746 by a land grant signed by King George II. The original burial ground still exists today, accompanied by a newer mausoleum.
- Saint Stephen's Cemetery & The Chapel at Short Hills, Short Hills. Saint Stephen's Cemetery has been serving NJ residents since 1858. The Chapel at Short Hills was later added to accommodate above-ground burials.

There are various attractions in Essex County, such as The Newark Museum of Art, New Jersey Historical Society, Montclair Art Museum, Turtle Back Zoo, Thomas Edison National Historical Park, and Grover Cleveland Birthplace. Essex County is home to part of the Port Newark–Elizabeth Marine Terminal, the largest port on the East Coast and the third largest in the United States, and two airports: Newark Liberty International Airport and Essex County Airport.

== Cultural references ==
Some of the county's municipalities, especially Newark, The Oranges, and The Caldwells, were seen on episodes of the HBO mob drama The Sopranos, which was set in North Caldwell.

== See also ==
- National Register of Historic Places listings in Essex County, New Jersey
- Essex County Resource Recovery Facility
