= Caldwell-West Caldwell Public Schools =

School district in Essex County, New Jersey, US

Address
- 104 Gray Street West Caldwell, Essex County, New Jersey, 07006; United States
- Coordinates: 40.848056°N 74.288315°W

District information
- Grades: PreK-12
- Superintendent: Christopher Conklin
- Business administrator: Brian McCarthy
- Schools: 7

Students and staff
- Enrollment: 2,669 (as of 2020–21)
- Faculty: 226.4 FTEs
- Student–teacher ratio: 11.8:1

Other information
- District Factor Group: I
- Website: www.cwcboe.org
Ind.	Per pupil	District spending	Rank (*)	K-12 average	%± vs. average
1A	Total Spending	$16,680	20	$18,891	−11.7%
1	Budgetary Cost	13,402	26	14,783	−9.3%
2	Classroom Instruction	7,442	16	8,763	−15.1%
6	Support Services	2,007	29	2,392	−16.1%
8	Administrative Cost	1,589	46	1,485	7.0%
10	Operations & Maintenance	1,806	50	1,783	1.3%
13	Extracurricular Activities	501	57	268	86.9%
16	Median Teacher Salary	61,669	27	64,043
Data from NJDoE 2014 Taxpayers' Guide to Education Spending. *Of K-12 districts with 1,800-3,500 students. Lowest spending=1; Highest=68

The Caldwell-West Caldwell Public Schools is a regional public school district serving students in kindergarten through twelfth grade from two communities in Essex County, in the U.S. state of New Jersey. The communities in the district are Caldwell and West Caldwell.

As of the 2020–21 school year, the district, comprising seven schools, had an enrollment of 2,669 students and 226.4 classroom teachers (on an FTE basis), for a student–teacher ratio of 11.8:1.

The district is classified by the New Jersey Department of Education as being in District Factor Group "I", the second-highest of eight groupings. District Factor Groups organize districts statewide to allow comparison by common socioeconomic characteristics of the local districts. From lowest socioeconomic status to highest, the categories are A, B, CD, DE, FG, GH, I and J.

== History ==
The roots of the district date back to 1872, though formal consolidation of the districts was established in 1904. Caldwell High School, established in 1910, served students from Tuition students from Essex Fells, Fairfield Township, Hanover Township, Livingston, North Caldwell, Roseland and Verona all attended the school. who attended as part of Sending/receiving relationships.

== Schools ==
There are four elementary schools between the two municipalities, all of which are named after American presidents. Students are districted to attend a certain one of the four elementary schools between Kindergarten and fifth grade, based on where they live. Based on the local boundaries, and where the schools lie in relation to the borders of the two communities, students from portions of both municipalities attend Lincoln, Jefferson, and Washington schools, which are all located quite close to the border between the two Caldwells. Wilson School, however, is located in the middle of southern West Caldwell near its border with Roseland and relatively far from Caldwell; so its students are exclusively from West Caldwell, in its westernmost neighborhoods. All students attend the district's middle school, named for the President, and all attend the high school, which is named after the Reverend James Caldwell, the same American Revolutionary War hero that both communities are named for.

Schools in the district (with 2020–21 enrollment data from the National Center for Education Statistics) are:

Preschool

- Harrison School (West Caldwell; 23 students; grades K-PreK)
  - Erin Madara, principal

Elementary schools

- Jefferson Elementary School (West Caldwell; 266; K-5)
  - Timothy Ayers, principal
- Lincoln Elementary School (Caldwell; 260; K-5)
  - Adam Geher, principal
- Washington Elementary School (West Caldwell; 374; K-5)
  - Thomas Adamo, principal
- Wilson Elementary School (West Caldwell; 252; K-5)
  - Frank Lincoln, principal

Middle school

- Grover Cleveland Middle School (Caldwell; 626; 6-8)
  - John Bertollo, principal

High school

- James Caldwell High School (West Caldwell; 829; 9-12)
  - Jim Devlin, principal

== Administration ==
Core members of the district's administration are:

- Christopher Conklin, superintendent
- Brian McCarthy, business administrator and board secretary

== Board of education ==
The district's board of education is composed of five members who set policy and oversee the fiscal and educational operation of the district through its administration. As a Type II school district, the board's trustees are elected directly by voters to serve three-year terms of office on a staggered basis, with either one or two seats up for election each year held (since 2012) as part of the November general election. The board appoints a superintendent to oversee the district's day-to-day operations and a business administrator to supervise the business functions of the district.
