= West Essex High School =

High school in Essex County, New Jersey, US

Location
- 65 West Greenbrook Road; North Caldwell, Essex County, New Jersey 07006; United States; 40.869371°N 74.267459°W

Information
- Type: Public high school
- Motto: "Dedicated to Academic Excellence and Social Responsibility."
- Established: 1960
- NCES School ID: 341746002462
- Principal: Kimberly Westervelt
- Faculty: 99.0 FTEs
- Enrollment: 1,055 (as of 2023–24)
- Student to teacher ratio: 10.7:1
- Campus: 100 acres (0.40 km^{2})
- Colors: Red white and black
- Athletics conference: Super Essex Conference (general); North Jersey Super Football Conference (football)
- Team name: Knights
- Publication: Roundtable
- Newspaper: Wessex Wire
- Yearbook: Milestone
- Website: hs.westex.org

West Essex High School is a four-year comprehensive public high school located in North Caldwell. The high school is part of the West Essex Regional School District, which is comprised of the constituent municipalities of Essex Fells, Fairfield, North Caldwell and Roseland, four municipalities in western Essex County, in the U.S. state of New Jersey. The constituent municipalities are largely filled with single-family homes and populated by individuals with high socioeconomic characteristics.

The school has been accredited by the Middle States Association of Colleges and Schools Commission on Elementary and Secondary Schools since 1964. Block scheduling was implemented for the 2014-15 school year.

As of the 2023–24 school year, the school had an enrollment of 1,055 students and 99.0 classroom teachers (on an FTE basis), for a student–teacher ratio of 10.7:1. There were 29 students (2.7% of enrollment) eligible for free lunch and 11 (1.0% of students) eligible for reduced-cost lunch.

== History ==
In the 1951–52 school year, students from the municipalities that were to become part the West Essex Regional School District – Caldwell Township (present day Fairfield), Essex Fells, North Caldwell and Roseland – attended James Caldwell High School as part of a sending/receiving relationship. A survey commissioned by the school boards of the four districts and the Caldwell-West Caldwell Public Schools from the Rutgers University Extension Service estimated that the schools would have 1,200 junior-senior high school students by 1961.

A 1956 study had recommended the formation of a consolidated K-12 district for all of the five districts. When that recommendation was not accepted, the Rutgers group suggested the creation of a regional 7–12 school district that would include Caldwell Township, Essex Fells, North Caldwell and Roseland. A committee formed the following year that included individuals from each of the four communities and the Essex County Superintendent of Schools recommended that the four municipalities should form a regional school district, to be approved by voters in a referendum. The New Jersey Department of Education approved the move, and in December 1957 the referendum was passed by the voters.

Shortly thereafter, the first regional district school board was established, with two members each from Caldwell Township, Essex Fells and North Caldwell and three from Roseland. In February 1958, the Regional Board of Education was elected by the voters, with Wallace S. Jones of Essex Fells as its first president. A Citizens School Curriculum Advisory Committee was formed which recommended that College Preparatory, General Academic, and Commercial programs should be offered to students based on the approach of offering "education for all, excellence of performance though self-discipline, independent thinking, and a sense of 'true values'", with a staff of high quality, adequate guidance, the grouping of students, availability of electives, insistence on effective English, and a broad extracurricular program.

In July 1958, voters authorized $290,000 for the purchase of a 73-acre (300,000 m^{2}) site, of which 60 acres (240,000 m^{2}) lay in North Caldwell and 13 in Caldwell Township. The site is located between Grandview and Passaic Avenues, directly north of Greenbrook Road, about 25 miles (40 km) outside of New York City.

A December 1958 referendum decided upon by voters in each of the four communities proposed a $4.5 million bond (equivalent to $50.2 million in 2025) that would be used to pay for construction of the new school facility to be available for use in September 1960, as the Caldwell-West Caldwell District had indicated that it was unwilling to accommodate any students at Grover Cleveland High School from outside the district after that date due to overcrowding. The West Essex district opened in September 1960 for students in grades 9–11 in facilities rented from the Caldwell-West Caldwell district, and the district's new building opened for use in September 1961, at which time grades 7–12 and 1,200 students were served.

== Awards, recognition and rankings ==
The school was the 25th-ranked public high school in New Jersey out of 339 schools statewide in New Jersey Monthly magazine's September 2014 cover story on the state's "Top Public High Schools", using a new ranking methodology. The school had been ranked 16th in the state of 328 schools in 2012, after being ranked 36th in 2010 out of 322 schools listed. The magazine ranked the school 48th in 2008 out of 316 schools. The school was ranked 34th in the magazine's September 2006 issue, which included 316 schools across the state. Schooldigger.com ranked the school tied for 106th out of 381 public high schools statewide in its 2011 rankings (a decrease of 23 positions from the 2010 ranking) which were based on the combined percentage of students classified as proficient or above proficient on the mathematics (86.8%) and language arts literacy (95.9%) components of the High School Proficiency Assessment (HSPA).

In its 2013 report on "America's Best High Schools", The Daily Beast ranked the school 944th in the nation among participating public high schools and 70th among schools in New Jersey.

== Extracurricular activities ==
West Essex Regional High School provides many opportunities for students, from theater productions to sports teams to service clubs.

- Wessex Wire school newspaper has won multiple awards from Columbia Scholastic Press Association, Garden State Scholastic Press Association, and other student journalism organizations.
- Roundtable literary magazine has won multiple awards from Columbia Scholastic Press Association and other literary organizations.
- Milestone yearbook

There are many academic-based clubs (i.e. Italian Club, Robotics Team) and service-oriented clubs such as WE CARE (environment), WE HELP (community service), and WE STOP (peer leadership). WE also has a variety of arts-based groups, such as the art club, the Masquers theater group, the jazz choir, the girls a cappella choir (Ladies Knight), and the dance team. Additionally, there are other academic based clubs such as STEM club, FBLA, and DECA clubs.

Amenities

West Essex has many amenities that are available for students. It has four fields: one being a turf field for the West Essex Football Knights, two baseball fields that can also be used for other sports practices, and a soccer field. In addition, it has tennis courts used by the tennis teams.

=== Athletics ===
The West Essex High School Knights compete in the Super Essex Conference, which is comprised of public and private high schools in Essex County and was established following a reorganization of sports leagues in Northern New Jersey by the New Jersey State Interscholastic Athletic Association (NJSIAA). Prior to the NJSIAA's 2010 realignment, the school had competed as part of the Iron Hills Conference, which included public and private high schools in Essex County, Morris County and Union County. With 849 students in grades 10-12, the school was classified by the NJSIAA for the 2019–20 school year as Group III for most athletic competition purposes, which included schools with an enrollment of 761 to 1,058 students in that grade range. The West Essex football team competes in Patriot Division B of the North Jersey Super Football Conference, which was formed following the merger of several conferences in 2016. The football team competes in the Patriot White division of the North Jersey Super Football Conference, which includes 112 schools competing in 20 divisions, making it the nation's biggest football-only high school sports league. The school was classified by the NJSIAA as Group III North for football for 2024–2026, which included schools with 700 to 884 students.

The school participates as the host school / lead agency in a joint ice hockey team with James Caldwell High School. The co-op program operates under agreements scheduled to expire at the end of the 2023–24 school year.

Interscholastic athletic teams at West Essex include baseball (men), basketball (men and women), cross country (men and women), fencing (men and women), field hockey (women), football (men), golf (men and women), ice hockey (men), lacrosse (men and women), soccer (men and women), softball (women), swimming (men and women), tennis (men and women), track and field spring (men and women), track and field winter (men and women), volleyball (men and women) and wrestling (men).

The ice hockey team was Gordon Cup winner in 1963 and 1971, was the overall state champion in 1978, won the McInnis Cup in 1995 and 2010, won the NJSIAA public school state champions in 2004 and won the Public B title in 2010. The 1963 team won the Gordon Cup by a score of 4-1 against a Chatham Borough High School team that came into the finals undefeated. The 1978 team won the third NJSIAA state championship with a 6-3 win against Livingston High School, which had upset two-time defending champion Brick Township High School in the semifinal round. The team was the 2010 league champs and McInnis Cup champions, with an 8-0 win against Nutley High School in the championship game.

The boys' soccer team was Group II co-champions in 1964 with Chatham High School, in 1965 vs. Irvington Tech High School, and were 2000 co-champions with Moorestown High School, and won the Group III state championship in 1970 vs. Howell High School, in 1971 vs. Governor Livingston High School and in 1973 vs. Howell. The 1973 team won the Group III title and finished with a record of 15-1-2 after a finals defeat of a Howell team that was the defending champion and had entered the championships with a 38-game unbeaten streak.

The field hockey team was the NJSIAA North champion from 1971 to 1974, and won the North II Group III titles in 1975 (state runner-up), 1976, 1978, 1981 (runner-up), 1987 (state champion), 1989 (state champion), 1990, 1991 (state champion), 1992 (state champion), 1993 (North I/II combined, state champion), 1994 (runner-up), 1995 (runner-up), in North I Group IV in 1983 (runner-up), 1984 (state champion), in North II Group II in 1996 (state champion), 1997 (co-champion), 1998, in North I Group II in 2000, 2002 (state champion), 2004 (runner-up), 2005 (state champion), 2015, 2016 (state champion), 2017, 2018 (state champion), 2019 (state champion), in North II Group II in 2006 (state champion), in North I Group II in 2007 (state champion), 2008 (state champion), 2010 (runner-up), 2011 (state champion), 2012 (runner-up) and 2013 (state champion), and was state champion from 2021 to 2025 in North Group II. The 2016 team defeated Eastern Regional High School to win the Tournament of Champions. The team has won 23 state titles through 2025, the second-most in the state behind Eastern Regional High School. The 1992 team finished the season with a record of 21-0 and marked the team's 36th consecutive victory after winning the Group III title by defeating Rancocas Valley Regional High School by a score of 6-1 in the championship game. The field hockey team lost the 2006 Tournament of Champions, falling to Eastern High School by a 2–1 score. In 2007, the team won the North I, Group II state sectional championship with a 4–1 win over Newton High School in the tournament final. The team moved on to win the Group II state championship with a 4–0 win over Madison High School in the semis and a 3–1 win against Camden Catholic High School in the finals.

The football team won the North II Group III state championships in 1974 (awarded by NJSIAA) and 2017, were North II Group IV champions in 1980, were North II Group II state champions in 2001, 2003, 2004, 2006 and 2007, and won the North I Group II title in 2011. A crowd of more than 7,000 at Giants Stadium watch the 1980 team finish the season with a 10-1 record after winning the North II Group IV state sectional championship game by a score of 22-7 against Belleville High School. Down 6-0 in the first quarter, the 2001 team came back to win the North II Group II sectional title with a 16-6 victory against Orange High School in the playoff finals to finish the season with an 11-1 mark. The 2007 football team won the North II, Group II title with a 27–6 win over Morris Hills High School. The 2011 football team won the North I, Group II title with a 32–14 win over River Dell High School at MetLife Stadium. In 2017, the football team won the North II Group III state sectional championship with a 28-14 win against third-seeded Voorhees High School in the final game of the tournament playoff.

The boys' tennis team has won four state championships, including Group III title in 1974 vs. Northern Valley Regional High School at Demarest, in Group IV in 1985 vs. Ridgewood High School and back-to-back Group II state champions in 2000 and 2001 vs. Holmdel High School in both years.

The boys' wrestling team won the North II Group IV state sectional title in 1981, 1982 and 1984, won the North I Group II championship in 2010 and 2011, and won the North II Group III title in 2019 and 2020; The team won the Group III state championship in 2019.

The girls' tennis team won the Group III state championship in 1993, defeating Ocean Township High School in the tournament final.

The fencing team was the 1995 state champions in foil, finishing third place overall.

The girls' lacrosse team won the Group II state championship in 2009, defeating Hopewell Valley Central High School in the tournament final. The team was the state runner-up twice in the state championship game, losing to Moorestown High School both times, in 2000 by a score of 15-4 and in 2003, losing 15-1 in the finals to finish the season with a 19-2 record. The 2009 team was the Group II state champion, with a 12–10 win against Hopewell Valley Central High School.

The boys' lacrosse team made a 2004 appearance in state championship, 2004 Waterman Division Champions, 2004 Essex County Tournament finalists, Ranked number 4 in New Jersey in 2004. Four consecutive New Jersey state tournament appearances, 2005 state championship appearance, (2nd straight), 2009 Essex County Tournament champions.

The girls' soccer team won the 2005 North I Group II state sectional championships, Essex County champion and ranked 20th overall in New Jersey.

The softball team was the 2006 Iron Hills Conference Champions, North II Group II state champions, 2007 Essex County Champions (upset No. 1 Star-Ledger and No. 1 seeded Bloomfield in the semi-final game and beat the No. 2 seed Mount St. Dominic Academy by a score of 2–0 in the championship game), 2009 Iron Hills Conference Champions, 2010 North II Group II sectional champion (winning all four playoff games by shutout, including an 8-0 win over Rutherford High School in the tournament final), Ranked No. 1 in the County, First time in school history ranked in The Star-Ledger top 20, Ranked No. 9 in the state.

The boys' track team had been undefeated in dual meets since 2009 and its record was 51-0 in the Super Essex Conference. The team won the North II Group II state sectional champions in 2015, their first state title since 1979. and repeated as sectional champion in 2016. The team was the 2016 Group II state relay champions.

In 2010, the baseball team defeated Audubon High School in the tournament final to win the Group II state championship. In 2006, the team was seeded # 15 in the 74th Greater Newark Tournament, the West Essex Knights defeated No. 2 Nutley High School, No. 10 Montclair Kimberley Academy, No. 3, East Side High School, and No. 1 Seton Hall Preparatory School (by a score of 5-2 in the championship game), en route to the school's first ever GNT championship. In 2009 the Knights won the North II Group II sectional championship, defeating Hackettstown High School. In the most successful season in school history, the 2010 team won the 77th Greater Newark Tournament, Super Essex Conference champions, North II Group II and Group II state champions en route to becoming the No. 1 ranked team in New Jersey as well as 7th on the East Coast according to USA Today.

The golf team compiled an 88–0 dual match record from 1980 through 1983. 1980, 1981, 1982, 1983, 2007 Iron Hills Conference Champions, 2007 Group II State Sectional 2nd Place, 1983 NJSIAA Tournament of Champions 6th Place Overall, 2007 NJSIAA Tournament of Champions 8th Place overall.

The girls' track team won the Group II indoor relay championship in 2016.

The girls' track team won the winter / indoor Group II state title in 2017.

Since 2003, the West Essex Marching Knights have been ranked by TOB as one of the top 25 Bands on the East Coast. In 2004, 2005, 2007, and 2012, they were also the TOB chapter X champions. The 2007 Marching Band placed 9th place in the Atlantic Coast Championships, having never placed before in the top 10 in ACCs. In 2008 the Marching Knights finished 8th at ACC's as well as a 4th place color guard and an award for the best overall woodwind section. The Marching Knights' 2009 show "Into the Unknown" earned the title of Chapter 10 Champions and finished a school high of 5th with a score of 92.90 at the Atlantic Coast Championships. This was the 1st time the Knights had ever finished in the top 5 at ACCs. They continued to rank highly from 2012 to 2015. In 2016, the West Essex Marching Knights ranked 1st place for the first time in school history with a score of 94.405 along with best percussion, outranking 15 others. The Knights were promoted from group 2-A, to 2-Open, a more elite class.

== In popular culture ==
West Essex is mentioned in the HBO series The Sopranos. North Caldwell, the town where Tony Soprano and his family reside in the show is where West Essex is located, and the show was filmed on location all over North Caldwell and the surrounding communities. In the first episode of the show, a character mentions he attended the high school shortly before being murdered by Christopher Moltisanti over a garbage disposal dispute. The school is mentioned numerous times in the show.

== Administration ==
The school's principal is Kimberly Westervelt. Her core administrative team includes two assistant principals.

== Notable alumni ==
- Leith Anderson (born 1944), evangelical Christian leader, author and retired pastor
- Ed Baker (born 1948), quarterback who played a single game in the NFL for the Houston Oilers in 1972
- Denise Borino-Quinn (1964-2010), Ginny Sacramoni recurring role on The Sopranos
- Bob Bradley (born 1958), manager of MLS club Los Angeles FC, former manager of Premier League club Swansea City (UK), manager of Stabæk Fotball (Norway), former head coach of the Egyptian Men's Soccer Team, US Men's Soccer Team, MLS Chicago Fire, and MLS NY/NJ Metrostars
- Scott Bradley (born 1960), former professional catcher who played in Major League Baseball from 1984 to 1992
- Rob Burnett (born 1962), television writer, creator of Ed
- Cash Cash (formed 2008), electronic music group signed to Atlantic Records with top 40 hit song "Take Me Home", with members Jean Paul Makhlouf, Alexander Makhlouf and Samuel Frisch
- David Chase (born 1945, class of 1964), creator of The Sopranos
- Chris Corbo (born 2004, class of 2022), college football tight end for the Georgia Tech Yellow Jackets
- Noah Eagle (born 1997, class of 2015), sportscaster for Fox Sports and the Tennis Channel
- Robert Egan (born 1958, class of 1976), restaurateur and an interlocutor between the government of the Democratic People's Republic of Korea (North Korea) and the United States
- Josh Gottheimer (born 1975), lawyer, speechwriter, public policy adviser and politician who serves as the U.S. representative for New Jersey's 5th congressional district
- David Greczek (born 1994), professional soccer player who plays as a goalkeeper for Swope Park Rangers in the United Soccer League
- Gurbir Grewal (born 1973), Attorney General of New Jersey
- John LoCascio (born 1991), defenseman for the Rochester Rattlers in Major League Lacrosse
- Joe Piscopo (born 1951), Saturday Night Live comedian
- Barbara Rachelson, politician who has served in the Vermont House of Representatives since 2014
- Ronald T. Raines (born 1958), professor at the Massachusetts Institute of Technology and member of the American Academy of Arts and Sciences
- T.J. Rooney (born 1964, class of 1983), former chairman of the Pennsylvania Democratic Party and a former member of the Pennsylvania House of Representatives
- Jeffrey Rosen, founder, chairman, and owner of Triangle Financial Services and the owner of the Maccabi Haifa basketball team
- Michelle Thomas (1968–1998), played Myra on Family Matters
- Eugene Van Taylor retired soccer goalkeeper who played in the North American Soccer League, American Soccer League and Major Indoor Soccer League
- Michelle Vizzuso (born 1977), former field hockey player
