= West Essex Regional School District =

School district in Essex County, New Jersey, US

Address
- 65 West Greenbrook Road North Caldwell, Essex County, New Jersey, 07006; United States
- Coordinates: 40.869371°N 74.267459°W

District information
- Grades: 7-12
- Superintendent: Damion Macioci
- Business administrator: Melissa Kida
- Schools: 2

Students and staff
- Enrollment: 1,648 (as of 2024–25)
- Faculty: 152.6 FTEs
- Student–teacher ratio: 10.8:1

Other information
- District Factor Group: I
- Website: www.westex.org
Ind.	Per pupil	District spending	Rank (*)	7-12 average	%± vs. average
1A	Total Spending	$22,962	35	$18,891	21.5%
1	Budgetary Cost	17,013	36	14,586	16.6%
2	Classroom Instruction	9,675	37	8,339	16.0%
6	Support Services	2,202	20	2,114	4.2%
8	Administrative Cost	1,962	43	1,561	25.7%
10	Operations & Maintenance	2,274	37	1,798	26.5%
13	Extracurricular Activities	893	27	673	32.7%
16	Median Teacher Salary	70,627	28	65,769
Data from NJDoE 2017 Taxpayers' Guide to Education Spending. *Of 7-12 districts with any number of students. Lowest spending=1; Highest=47

The West Essex Regional School District is a regional public school district serving students in seventh through twelfth grade from Essex Fells, Fairfield, North Caldwell and Roseland, four municipalities in western Essex County, in the U.S. state of New Jersey. These four suburban residential communities located approximately 25 miles (40 km) from New York City have a combined population of approximately 23,000 people and cover an area of 18 square miles (47 km^{2}).

West Essex Regional is accredited by the New Jersey Department of Education and the Middle States Association of Colleges and Schools.

As of the 2024–25 school year, the district, comprised of two schools, had an enrollment of 1,648 students and 152.6 classroom teachers (on an FTE basis), for a student–teacher ratio of 10.8:1.

== History ==
In December 1957, a referendum was passed by residents of Essex Fells, Fairfield (then known as Caldwell Township), North Caldwell and Roseland to create a regional high school district. Until then, the residents of those communities had attended James Caldwell High School (then known as Grover Cleveland High School) as part of a sending/receiving relationship with the Caldwell-West Caldwell Public Schools, which said that it would no longer be able to accept students from those districts/

In December 1958, voters passed a referendum for a $4.5 million bond (equivalent to $50.2 million in 2025) that would be used to pay for construction of the new school facility to be available for use in September 1960. The West Essex district opened in September 1960 for students in grades 9–11 in facilities rented from the Caldwell-West Caldwell district, and the district's new building opened in September 1961, with 1,200 students in grades 7–12.

The district had been classified by the New Jersey Department of Education as being in District Factor Group "I", the second-highest of eight groupings. District Factor Groups organize districts statewide to allow comparison by common socioeconomic characteristics of the local districts. From lowest socioeconomic status to highest, the categories are A, B, CD, DE, FG, GH, I and J.

== Awards, recognition and rankings ==
The school was the 16th-ranked public high school in New Jersey out of 328 schools statewide in New Jersey Monthly magazine's September 2012 cover story on the state's "Top Public High Schools", after being ranked 36th in 2010 out of 322 schools listed. The magazine ranked the school 48th in 2008 out of 316 schools.

== Schools ==
Schools in the district (with 2024–25 enrollment data from the National Center for Education Statistics) are:

- West Essex Middle School with 558 students in grades 7–8
  - Alicia Angione, principal
- West Essex High School with 1,061 students in grades 9–12
  - Kimberly Westervelt, principal

== Administration ==
Members of the district administration are:

- Damion Macioci, superintendent
- Melissa Kida, business administrator and board secretary

== Board of education ==
The district's board of education, comprised of nine members, sets policy and oversees the fiscal and educational operation of the district through its administration. As a Type II school district, the board's trustees are elected directly by voters to serve three-year terms of office on a staggered basis, with three seats up for election each year held (since 2012) as part of the November general election. The board appoints a superintendent to oversee the district's day-to-day operations and a business administrator to supervise the business functions of the district. Seats on the board of education are allocated based on the population of the constituent municipalities, with three seats assigned to Fairfield, three to North Caldwell, two to Roseland and one to Essex Fells.
