= North Caldwell, New Jersey =

Borough in Essex County, New Jersey, US

- Borough
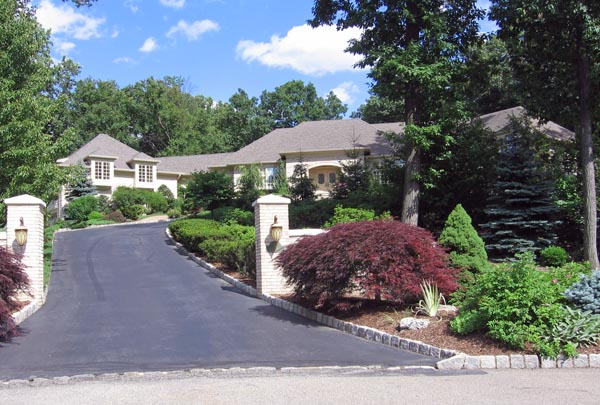
- Home in North Caldwell, exterior shots of which were used in the HBO TV series The Sopranos to portray the house the Soprano family resided in.

- logo

- Location in Essex County and the state of New Jersey.

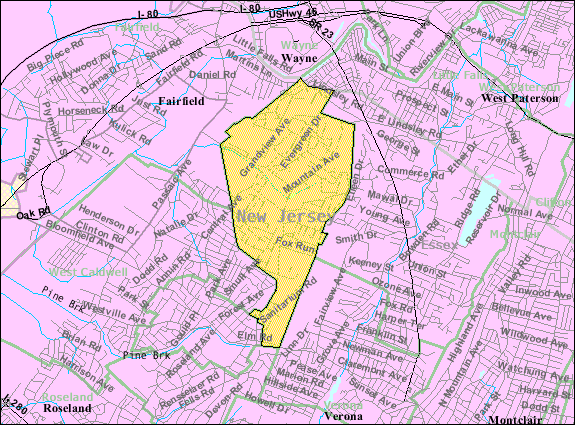
- Census Bureau map of North Caldwell, New Jersey

- Location in Essex County Location in New Jersey Location in the United States
- Coordinates: 40.8645°N 74.259996°W
- Country: United States
- State: New Jersey
- County: Essex
- Incorporated: March 31, 1898
- Named for: James Caldwell

Government
  - Type: Borough
  - Body: Borough Council
  - Mayor: Joshua H. Raymond (D, term ends December 31, 2026)
  - Administrator: Glenn Domenick
  - Municipal Clerk: Tami Michelotti

Area
  - Total: 3.07 sq mi (7.96 km^{2})
  - Land: 3.07 sq mi (7.95 km^{2})
  - Water: 0.0039 sq mi (0.01 km^{2}) 0.16%
  - Rank: 332nd of 565 in state 15th of 22 in county
- Elevation: 420 ft (130 m)

Population (2020)
  - Total: 6,694
  - Estimate (2024): 6,769
  - Rank: 325th of 565 in state 20th of 22 in county
  - Density: 2,182/sq mi (842/km^{2})
  - Rank: 282nd of 565 in state 18th of 22 in county
- Time zone: UTC−05:00 (Eastern (EST))
  - Summer (DST): UTC−04:00 (Eastern (EDT))
- ZIP Code: 07006 – Caldwell
- Area codes: 201 and 973
- FIPS code: 3401352620
- GNIS feature ID: 0878839
- Website: northcaldwell.org

North Caldwell is a borough in northwestern Essex County, in the U.S. state of New Jersey, and a suburb of New York City. As of the 2020 United States census, the borough's population was 6,694, an increase of 511 (+8.3%) from the 2010 census count of 6,183, which in turn reflected a decline of 1,192 (−16.2%) from the 7,375 counted in the 2000 census.

North Caldwell was incorporated by an act of the New Jersey Legislature on March 31, 1898, from portions of Caldwell Township (now known as Fairfield Township). The borough derives its name from Presbyterian minister James Caldwell.

New Jersey Monthly magazine ranked North Caldwell as its 10th-best place to live in its 2010 rankings of the "Best Places To Live" in New Jersey, and its third-best place to live in its 2013 ranking. In 2017, a Bloomberg analysis ranked North Caldwell the 34th richest town in the United States.

== History ==
North Caldwell was part of the Horseneck Tract, which was an area that consisted of what are now the municipalities of Caldwell, West Caldwell, North Caldwell, Fairfield, Verona, Cedar Grove, Essex Fells, Roseland, and portions of Livingston and West Orange. In 1702, settlers purchased the 14,000 acres (57 km^{2}) from the Lenape Native Americans for goods equal to $325. The explanation for the name "Horse Neck" lies in the language of its first Dutch settlers and not (as has been inaccurately reported) because of its irregular shape. This purchase encompassed much of western Essex County, from the First Mountain to the Passaic River.

In 1982, the borough was one of four Essex County municipalities to pass a referendum to become a township, joining 11 municipalities that had already made the change. Ultimately, more than a dozen Essex County municipalities reclassified themselves as townships in order take advantage of federal revenue sharing policies that allocated townships a greater share of government aid to municipalities on a per capita basis. Effective January 1, 1992, it again became a borough.

The borough housed the Essex County Penitentiary, constructed in 1872 and used as the Essex County Jail Annex until 2004. It was sold to K. Hovnanian Companies in 2002, which redeveloped the site into a residential community.

In 1994, the "Unabomber", Theodore Kaczynski, sent a mail bomb that killed Thomas J. Mosser, an advertising executive who lived in the borough.

== Geography ==
According to the United States Census Bureau, the borough had a total area of 3.07 square miles (7.96 km^{2}), including 3.07 square miles (7.95 km^{2}) of land and 0.01 square miles (0.01 km^{2}) of water (0.16%). The highest point in Essex County is located in the Hilltop of North Caldwell at 691 feet (211 m).

The borough is bordered by the municipalities of Caldwell, Cedar Grove, Essex Fells, Fairfield Township, Verona and West Caldwell in Essex County; and Little Falls and Wayne in Passaic County.

== Demographics ==
Historical population
Census	Pop.	Note	%±
1900	297		—
1910	595		100.3%
1920	683		14.8%
1930	1,492		118.4%
1940	1,572		5.4%
1950	1,781		13.3%
1960	4,163		133.7%
1970	6,733		61.7%
1980	5,832		−13.4%
1990	6,706		15.0%
2000	7,375		10.0%
2010	6,183		−16.2%
2020	6,694		8.3%
2024 (est.)	6,769	▲	1.1%
Population sources: 1900–1920; 1900–1910 1910–1930; 1940–2000 2000; 2010 2020

=== 2020 census ===
As of the 2020 census, North Caldwell had a population of 6,694. The median age was 44.4 years. 24.7% of residents were under the age of 18 and 18.9% of residents were 65 years of age or older. For every 100 females there were 97.2 males, and for every 100 females age 18 and over there were 95.2 males age 18 and over.

100.0% of residents lived in urban areas, while 0.0% lived in rural areas.

There were 2,258 households in North Caldwell, of which 40.5% had children under the age of 18 living in them. Of all households, 75.3% were married-couple households, 8.1% were households with a male householder and no spouse or partner present, and 13.9% were households with a female householder and no spouse or partner present. About 11.9% of all households were made up of individuals and 7.1% had someone living alone who was 65 years of age or older.

There were 2,364 housing units, of which 4.5% were vacant. The homeowner vacancy rate was 1.0% and the rental vacancy rate was 25.8%.

Racial composition as of the 2020 census
Race	Number	Percent
White	5,556	83.0%
Black or African American	88	1.3%
American Indian and Alaska Native	10	0.1%
Asian	522	7.8%
Native Hawaiian and Other Pacific Islander	0	0.0%
Some other race	97	1.4%
Two or more races	421	6.3%
Hispanic or Latino (of any race)	405	6.1%

=== 2010 census ===
The 2010 United States census counted 6,183 people, 2,092 households, and 1,820 families in the borough. The population density was 2,053.2 per square mile (792.7/km^{2}). There were 2,134 housing units at an average density of 708.6 per square mile (273.6/km^{2}). The racial makeup was 91.69% (5,669) White, 0.73% (45) Black or African American, 0.03% (2) Native American, 5.73% (354) Asian, 0.00% (0) Pacific Islander, 0.49% (30) from other races, and 1.34% (83) from two or more races. Hispanic or Latino of any race were 4.21% (260) of the population.

Of the 2,092 households, 41.3% had children under the age of 18; 78.1% were married couples living together; 6.5% had a female householder with no husband present and 13.0% were non-families. Of all households, 10.7% were made up of individuals and 5.7% had someone living alone who was 65 years of age or older. The average household size was 2.96 and the average family size was 3.19.

27.3% of the population were under the age of 18, 5.2% from 18 to 24, 19.6% from 25 to 44, 33.9% from 45 to 64, and 14.1% who were 65 years of age or older. The median age was 43.8 years. For every 100 females, the population had 99.6 males. For every 100 females ages 18 and older there were 97.0 males.

The Census Bureau's 2006–2010 American Community Survey showed that (in 2010 inflation-adjusted dollars) median household income was $151,953 (with a margin of error of +/− $28,824) and the median family income was $178,750 (+/− $38,265). Males had a median income of $140,729 (+/− $14,382) versus $74,750 (+/− $15,480) for females. The per capita income for the borough was $71,798 (+/− $8,574). About none of families and 2.4% of the population were below the poverty line, including none of those under age 18 and 3.9% of those age 65 or over.

=== 2000 census ===
As of the 2000 United States census there were 7,375 people, 2,070 households, and 1,834 families residing in the borough. The population density was 2,464.6 inhabitants per square mile (951.6/km^{2}). There were 2,108 housing units at an average density of 704.5 per square mile (272.0/km^{2}). The racial makeup of the borough was 79.63% White, 14.51% African American, 0.03% Native American, 4.71% Asian, 0.26% from other races, and 0.87% from two or more races. Hispanic or Latino of any race were 2.16% of the population.

There were 2,070 households, out of which 42.0% had children under the age of 18 living with them, 80.5% were married couples living together, 5.9% had a female householder with no husband present, and 11.4% were non-families. 9.6% of all households were made up of individuals, and 4.8% had someone living alone who was 65 years of age or older. The average household size was 3.02 and the average family size was 3.23.

In the borough the population was spread out, with 23.1% under the age of 18, 8.7% from 18 to 24, 31.0% from 25 to 44, 26.4% from 45 to 64, and 10.9% who were 65 years of age or older. The median age was 37 years. For every 100 females, there were 118.5 males. For every 100 females age 18 and over, there were 124.2 males.

The median income for a household in the borough was $117,395, and the median income for a family was $125,465. Males had a median income of $87,902 versus $47,904 for females. The per capita income for the borough was $48,249. About 0.8% of families and 1.2% of the population were below the poverty line, including 2.4% of those under age 18 and none of those age 65 or over.

== Government ==
=== Local government ===
North Caldwell is governed under the borough form of New Jersey municipal government, which is used in 218 municipalities (of the 564) statewide, making it the most common form of government in New Jersey. The governing body is comprised of the mayor and the borough council, with all positions elected at-large on a partisan basis as part of the November general election. The mayor is elected directly by the voters to a four-year term of office. The borough council includes six members elected to serve three-year terms on a staggered basis, with two seats coming up for election each year in a three-year cycle.

The borough form of government used by North Caldwell is a "weak mayor / strong council" government in which council members act as the legislative body with the mayor presiding at meetings and voting only in the event of a tie. The mayor can veto ordinances subject to an override by a two-thirds majority vote of the council. The mayor makes committee and liaison assignments for council members, and most appointments are made by the mayor with the advice and consent of the council.

As of 2025, the mayor of North Caldwell is Democrat Joshua H. Raymond, whose term of office ends December 31, 2026. Members of the Borough Council are Council President Anthony Floria-Callori (D, 2026), Matthew J. Atlas (D, 2026), Arthur J. Rees (R, 2028), Johanna Stroever (D, 2027), Kenneth Tilton (R, 2027) and Suzanne Corbo (R, 2028).

In January 2023, the borough council appointed Kenneth Tilton to fill vacant seat expiring in December 2023 that had been held by Francis Astorino.

In October 2014, the borough council appointed Robert Kessler to fill the vacant seat of Patricia Fost.

=== Federal, state and county representation ===
North Caldwell is located in the 11th Congressional District and is part of New Jersey's 40th state legislative district.

For the 119th United States Congress, New Jersey's 11th congressional district is represented by Analilia Mejia (D, Glen Ridge) who was elected in a 2026 special election to serve for the remainder of the Congress following the resignation Mikie Sherrill (D, Montclair), who was elected Governor of New Jersey in 2025. New Jersey is represented in the United States Senate by Democrats Cory Booker (Newark, term ends 2027) and Andy Kim (Moorestown, term ends 2031).

For the 2026–2027 session, the 40th legislative district of the New Jersey Legislature is represented in the State Senate by Kristin Corrado (R, Totowa) and in the General Assembly by Al Barlas (R, Cedar Grove) and Christopher DePhillips (R, Wyckoff).

Essex County is governed by a directly elected county executive, with legislative functions performed by the Board of County Commissioners. As of 2025, the County Executive is Joseph N. DiVincenzo Jr. (D, Roseland), whose four-year term of office ends December 31, 2026. The county's Board of County Commissioners is composed of nine members, five of whom are elected from districts and four of whom are elected on an at-large basis. They are elected for three-year concurrent terms and may be re-elected to successive terms at the annual election in November. Essex County's Commissioners are:

Robert Mercado (D, District 1 – Newark's North and East Wards, parts of Central and West Wards; Newark, 2026), A'Dorian Murray-Thomas (D, District 2 – Irvington, Maplewood and parts of Newark's South and West Wards; Newark, 2026), Vice President Tyshammie L. Cooper (D, District 3 - Newark: West and Central Wards; East Orange, Orange and South Orange; East Orange, 2026), Leonard M. Luciano (D, District 4 – Caldwell, Cedar Grove, Essex Fells, Fairfield, Livingston, Millburn, North Caldwell, Roseland, Verona, West Caldwell and West Orange; West Caldwell, 2026), President Carlos M. Pomares (D, District 5 – Belleville, Bloomfield, Glen Ridge, Montclair and Nutley; Bloomfield, 2026), Brendan W. Gill (D, at large; Montclair, 2026), Romaine Graham (D, at large; Irvington, 2026), Wayne Richardson (D, at large; Newark, 2026), Patricia Sebold (D, at-large; Livingston, 2026).

Constitutional officers elected countywide are: Clerk Christopher J. Durkin (D, West Caldwell, 2025), Register of Deeds Juan M. Rivera Jr. (D, Newark, 2029), Sheriff Amir Jones (D, Newark, 2027), and Surrogate Alturrick Kenney (D, Newark, 2028).

=== Politics ===
As of March 2011, there were a total of 4,712 registered voters in North Caldwell, of which 1,123 (23.8%) were registered as Democrats, 1,591 (33.8%) were registered as Republicans and 1,994 (42.3%) were registered as Unaffiliated. There were 4 voters registered as Libertarians or Greens.

United States presidential election results for North Caldwell
Year	Republican		Democratic		Third party(ies)	
Year	No.	%	No.	%	No.	%
2024	2,126	49.85%	2,057	48.23%	82	1.92%
2020	2,119	46.77%	2,355	51.98%	57	1.26%
2016	1,814	50.33%	1,693	46.98%	97	2.69%
2012	2,043	61.15%	1,253	37.50%	45	1.35%
2008	2,047	57.39%	1,495	41.91%	25	0.70%
2004	2,137	59.08%	1,465	40.50%	15	0.41%

In the 2012 presidential election, Republican Mitt Romney received 61.1% of the vote (2,043 cast), ahead of Democrat Barack Obama with 37.5% (1,253 votes), and other candidates with 1.3% (45 votes), among the 3,361 ballots cast by the borough's 4,856 registered voters (20 ballots were spoiled), for a turnout of 69.2%. In the 2008 presidential election, Republican John McCain received 56.8% of the vote (2,047 cast), ahead of Democrat Barack Obama with 41.5% (1,495 votes) and other candidates with 0.7% (25 votes), among the 3,603 ballots cast by the borough's 4,704 registered voters, for a turnout of 76.6%. In the 2004 presidential election, Republican George W. Bush received 58.9% of the vote (2,137 ballots cast), outpolling Democrat John Kerry with 40.4% (1,465 votes) and other candidates with 0.3% (15 votes), among the 3,628 ballots cast by the borough's 4,502 registered voters, for a turnout percentage of 80.6.

Gubernatorial election results for North Caldwell
Year	Republican		Democratic		Third party(ies)	
Year	No.	%	No.	%	No.	%
2025	1,900	51.69%	1,770	48.15%	6	0.16%
2021	1,626	52.47%	1,461	47.14%	12	0.39%
2017	1,037	51.54%	915	45.48%	60	2.98%
2013	1,446	72.92%	517	26.07%	20	1.01%
2009	1,495	61.05%	789	32.22%	165	6.74%
2005	1,345	57.19%	974	41.41%	33	1.40%

In the 2013 gubernatorial election, Republican Chris Christie received 72.9% of the vote (1,446 cast), ahead of Democrat Barbara Buono with 26.1% (517 votes), and other candidates with 1.0% (20 votes), among the 2,012 ballots cast by the borough's 4,920 registered voters (29 ballots were spoiled), for a turnout of 40.9%. In the 2009 gubernatorial election, Republican Chris Christie received 60.6% of the vote (1,495 ballots cast), ahead of Democrat Jon Corzine with 32.0% (789 votes), Independent Chris Daggett with 6.4% (157 votes) and other candidates with 0.3% (8 votes), among the 2,469 ballots cast by the borough's 4,695 registered voters, yielding a 52.6% turnout.

United States Senate election results for North Caldwell1
Year	Republican		Democratic		Third party(ies)	
Year	No.	%	No.	%	No.	%
2024	2,099	50.35%	1,999	47.95%	71	1.70%
2018	1,292	54.58%	1,036	43.77%	39	1.65%
2012	1,734	56.95%	1,222	40.13%	89	2.92%
2006	1,448	56.34%	1,087	42.30%	35	1.36%

United States Senate election results for North Caldwell2
Year	Republican		Democratic		Third party(ies)	
Year	No.	%	No.	%	No.	%
2020	2,169	48.94%	2,228	50.27%	35	0.79%
2014	898	55.57%	697	43.13%	21	1.30%
2013	2,340	49.74%	2,318	49.28%	46	0.98%
2008	1,837	56.63%	1,367	42.14%	40	1.23%

== Education ==
The North Caldwell Public Schools serve students in pre-kindergarten through sixth grade. As of the 2023–24 school year, the district, comprised of two schools, had an enrollment of 691 students and 70.2 classroom teachers (on an FTE basis), for a student–teacher ratio of 9.8:1. Schools in the district (with 2023–24 enrollment data from the National Center for Education Statistics) are Grandview School with 395 students in grades PreK–3 and Gould School with 283 students in grades 4–6. Gould / Mountain School was one of nine schools in New Jersey honored in 2020 by the National Blue Ribbon Schools Program, which recognizes high student achievement.

North Caldwell is home to the West Essex Regional School District, which also serves public school students from Fairfield, Essex Fells and Roseland in seventh through twelfth grades. Schools in the district (with 2023–24 enrollment data from the National Center for Education Statistics) are West Essex Middle School with 622 students in grades 7-8 and West Essex High School with 1,055 students in grades 9-12. Seats on the nine-member board of education of the high school district are allocated based on population, with three seats assigned to North Caldwell.

== Transportation ==
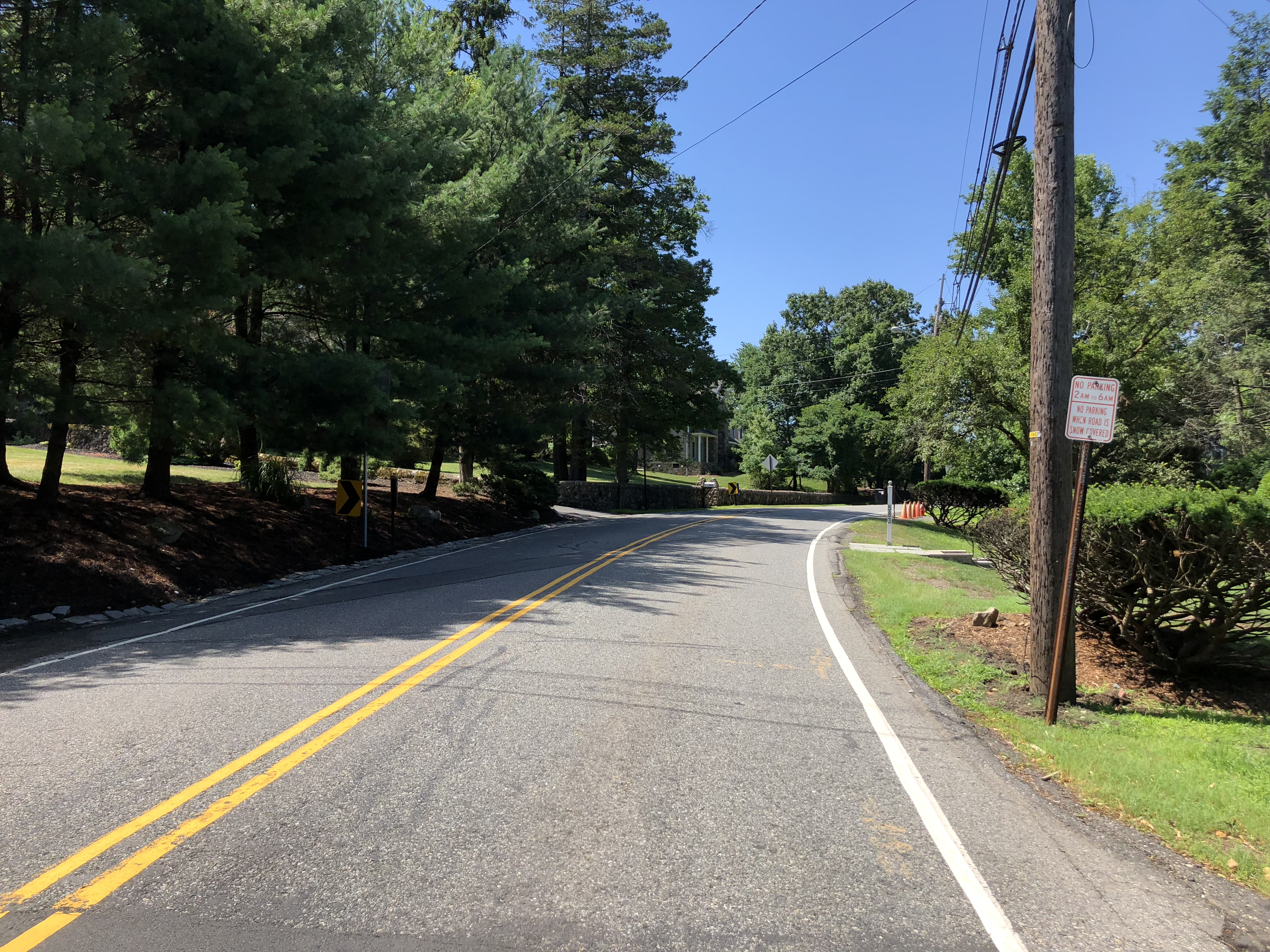
County Route 527 in North Caldwell

=== Roads and highways ===
As of May 2010, the borough had a total of 35.53 miles (57.18 km) of roadways, of which 29.55 miles (47.56 km) were maintained by the municipality and 5.98 miles (9.62 km) by Essex County.

The main roads serving North Caldwell include County Route 527 and County Route 506.

=== Public transportation ===
NJ Transit provides bus service to Newark on the 29 route.

== In popular culture ==
- In the HBO crime-drama television show The Sopranos (1999-2007), the house used during filming to portray the home of Tony Soprano and his family is located in North Caldwell. Many scenes throughout the show were filmed in North Caldwell and other communities in North Jersey.
- Stuckeyville, the fictional town in the NBC television series Ed, was modeled after North Caldwell.
- The 1994 film North included scenes which were filmed in North Caldwell.
- Sylvester Stallone filmed scenes from the movie Cop Land in 1997 at the Hilltop Reservations.
- Jermaine Jackson filmed the "Dynamite" music video in 1984 at the Essex County Jail Annex.

== Notable people ==
People who were born in, residents of, or otherwise closely associated with North Caldwell include:

- Martin Brodeur (born 1972), former goalie for the New Jersey Devils
- Jane Burgio (1922–2005), politician who served as Secretary of State of New Jersey and as a member of the New Jersey General Assembly
- Rob Burnett (born 1962), producer, director, and writer, who is the executive producer of the Late Show with David Letterman and president and CEO of Worldwide Pants
- David Chase (born 1945), creator of The Sopranos
- Ken Daneyko (born 1964), former New Jersey Devils defenseman
- Julio M. Fuentes (born 1946), Senior United States circuit judge of the United States Court of Appeals for the Third Circuit, who is the first Hispanic judge to serve the Third Circuit
- Josh Gottheimer (born 1975), Congressman who represents New Jersey's 5th congressional district
- Wyclef Jean (born 1969), hip hop and R&B music artist
- Jamie Langenbrunner (born 1975), winger and former captain of the New Jersey Devils
- Veronica Miele Beard, fashion designer
- David Newsom (born 1962), producer, actor, and fine-arts photographer
- Joe Piscopo (born 1951), comedian and actor best known for his work on Saturday Night Live
- Barbara Rachelson, politician who has served in the Vermont House of Representatives since 2014
- Frederic Remington (1929–2016), politician who served in the New Jersey General Assembly from 1978 to 1992
- Josh Saviano (born 1976), actor who played the role of "Paul Pfeiffer" on The Wonder Years
- Ernestine Schumann-Heink (1861–1936), opera singer
- Johnny Sylvester (1915–1990), who as a young boy achieved national fame when Babe Ruth dedicated home runs to him in the 1926 World Series
- Thea White (1940–2021), voice actress best known for her work as Muriel Bagge in the animated TV show Courage the Cowardly Dog
- Richard Wilbur (1921–2017), poet, critic, and translator that won two Pulitzer Prizes and served as United States Poet Laureate
- Joe Yeninas (1934–2020), cartoonist and illustrator for the Newark Evening News, the Associated Press, and The Journal of Commerce
