= West Caldwell, New Jersey =

Township in Essex County, New Jersey, US

- Township
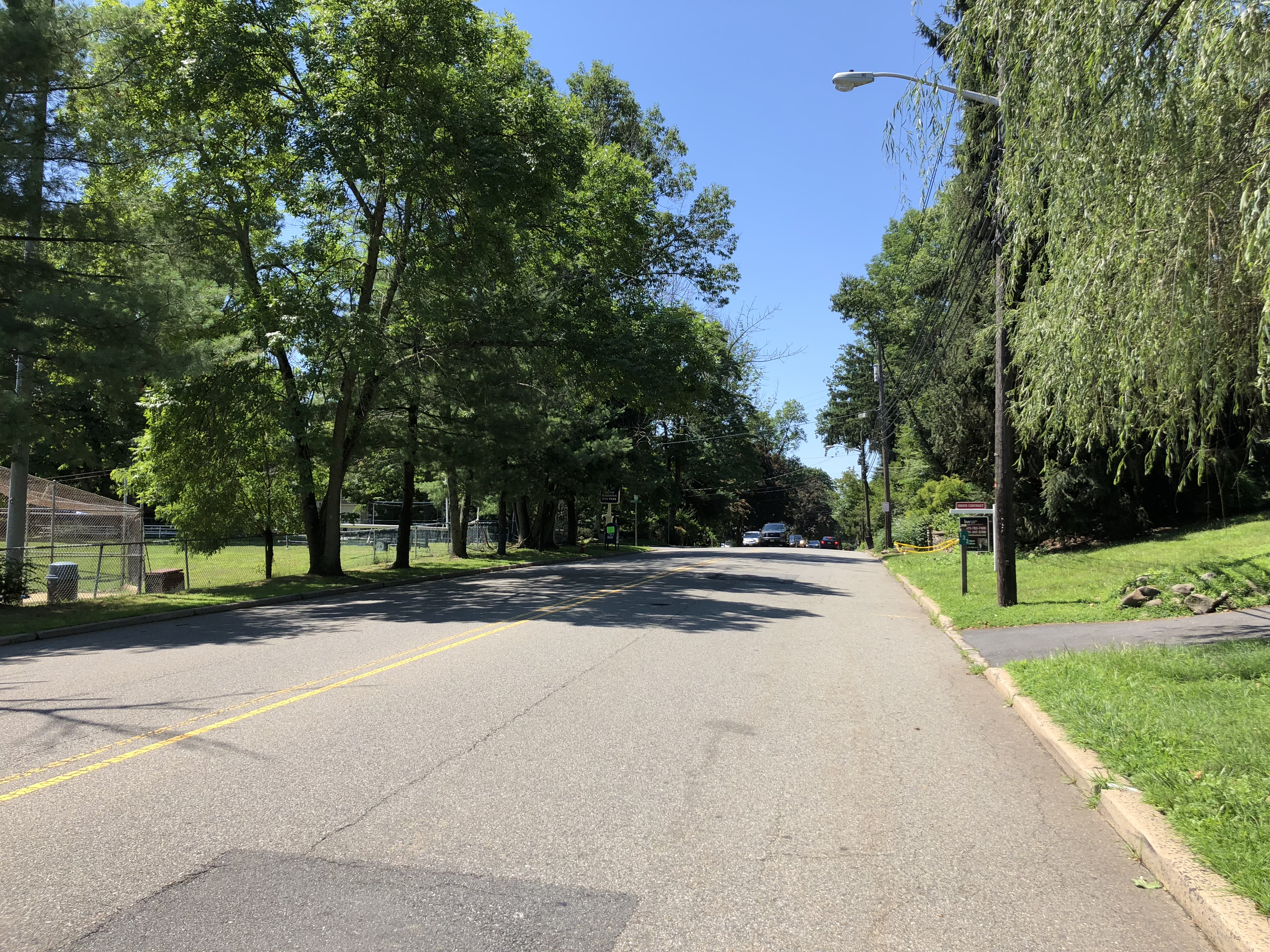
- Neighborhood reflecting the residential nature of West Caldwell

- Seal

- Location in Essex County and the state of New Jersey.

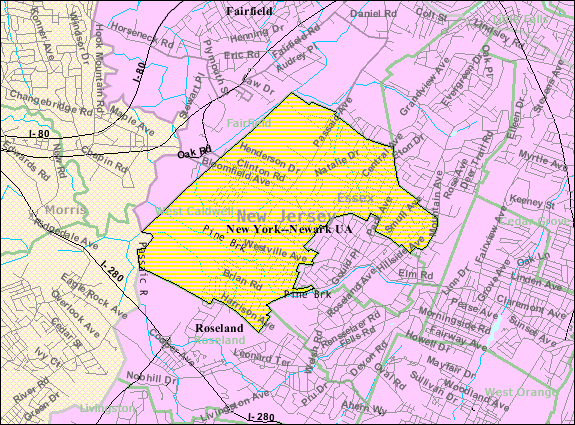
- Census Bureau map of West Caldwell, New Jersey

- Location in Essex County Location in New Jersey Location in the United States
- Coordinates: 40.847234°N 74.294428°W
- Country: United States
- State: New Jersey
- County: Essex
- Incorporated: February 24, 1904

Government
  - Type: Borough
  - Body: Township Council
  - Mayor: Joseph Tempesta Jr. (R, term ends December 31, 2026)
  - Municipal clerk: Joann DeBlasis

Area
  - Total: 5.11 sq mi (13.24 km^{2})
  - Land: 5.10 sq mi (13.20 km^{2})
  - Water: 0.015 sq mi (0.04 km^{2}) 0.31%
  - Rank: 274th of 565 in state 8th of 22 in county
- Elevation: 177 ft (54 m)

Population (2020)
  - Total: 11,012
  - Estimate (2024): 11,157
  - Rank: 227th of 565 in state 16th of 22 in county
  - Density: 2,160.5/sq mi (834.2/km^{2})
  - Rank: 283rd of 565 in state 19th of 22 in county
- Time zone: UTC−05:00 (Eastern (EST))
  - Summer (DST): UTC−04:00 (Eastern (EDT))
- ZIP Codes: 07006–07007
- Area codes: 201 (cell) and 862/973
- FIPS code: 3401378510
- GNIS feature ID: 1729717
- Website: www.westcaldwell.com

West Caldwell is a township located in the West Essex area in northwestern Essex County, in the U.S. state of New Jersey. It is located approximately 16 miles (26 km) west of Manhattan and 6 miles (9.7 km) northwest of Newark. As of the 2020 United States census, the township's population was 11,012, an increase of 253 (+2.4%) from the 2010 census count of 10,759, which in turn reflected a decline of 474 (−4.2%) from the 11,233 counted in the 2000 census.

West Caldwell was originally incorporated as a borough by an act of the New Jersey Legislature on February 24, 1904, from portions of Caldwell Township (now known as Fairfield Township). In 1981, the borough was one of seven Essex County municipalities to pass a referendum to become a township, joining four municipalities that had already made the change, of what would ultimately be more than a dozen Essex County municipalities to reclassify themselves as townships in order take advantage of federal revenue sharing policies that allocated townships a greater share of government aid to municipalities on a per capita basis. The borough was named for Caldwell Township, which in turn was named for Presbyterian minister James Caldwell.

New Jersey Monthly magazine ranked West Caldwell as its 60th best place to live in its 2010 rankings of the "Best Places To Live" in New Jersey.

== History ==
Caldwell, West Caldwell, and several neighboring communities were all originally one combined area known as the Horseneck Tract. In the early 18th century, a group of settlers left Newark and purchased a large tract of land northwest of their home city for the equivalent of a few hundred dollars from the Lenape Native Americans. This piece of land extended west and north to the Passaic River, south to the town center of what would become Livingston, and east to the First Watchung Mountain, and was called Horseneck by the natives because it resembled the neck and head of a horse.

What was then known as Horseneck contained most of the present day northern Essex County towns: West Caldwell, along with Caldwell, Cedar Grove, Essex Fells, Fairfield, North Caldwell, Roseland, and Verona are all located entirely in Horseneck, and parts of what are today Livingston, Montclair, and West Orange also were contained in the Horseneck tract. After the Revolutionary War, Horseneck changed its name to "Caldwell Township" in honor of a local war hero and pastor, James Caldwell, who used burning pages from his church's bibles to ignite the ammunition in soldiers' cannons and helped to drive the British out of Horseneck.

By the late 1880s, Caldwell had become quite a developed and populated town, however the vast majority of the development, residents, and businesses were located in the center of the town along Bloomfield Avenue, its main connecting route with Newark and New York City. The outskirts of town remained farms and swampland in many places. This bothered the people living in the center of town and in 1892, Caldwell's center area decided to form its own independent municipality, naming itself Caldwell Borough and leaving the outskirts of town remaining as Caldwell Township.

Caldwell Borough contained what is today the towns of West Caldwell and Caldwell. Soon after, the area of Caldwell Township just to the east of Caldwell Borough between Caldwell Borough and Montclair (present-day Verona and Cedar Grove) decided to follow Caldwell's lead and incorporated itself as its own borough, Verona. Some of the already-developed eastern neighborhoods of Caldwell Township chose to become part of Montclair, as it was a rapidly developing suburb of Newark and Paterson. At around the same time, the area north of Caldwell Borough became its own town, North Caldwell. The ritzy, wooded area directly to the south of downtown Caldwell Borough became Essex Fells. Meanwhile, the farmland to the south of the western portion of Caldwell township attempted to become its own municipality known as South Caldwell. This failed, as much of developed sections of that area lied on its southernmost and easternmost borders, along the expanding Newark suburbs of Livingston and West Orange respectively. Those areas were engulfed by those two towns once they became incorporated municipalities of several small settlements and developments. This left only the most rural farmland south of Caldwell Borough and Essex Fells to become its own township, Roseland. At this point, all that remained of the original Caldwell Township was a large piece of undeveloped land in the northwesternmost part of Essex County; eventually, in the early 1950s, Caldwell Township changed its name to Fairfield in order to avoid being confused with Caldwell Borough.

Immediately following the separation of the original Caldwell, the western part of Caldwell Borough generally remained less developed than downtown Caldwell Borough and contained several farms and a large area of undeveloped swampland known as Hatfield Swamp. However, two individual settlements, known as Franklin and Westville, soon formed in the western part of Caldwell Borough. As development increased and population grew in the western part of Caldwell, the town's more rural western population and more urban east often could not reconcile their differences. This led to the areas of Franklin and Westville consolidating into their own borough known as West Caldwell in 1904, leaving only the one square mile of original downtown Horseneck development as the borough of Caldwell. The first mayor of West Caldwell was Caleb Crane, a member of the successful Crane family related to Israel Crane of Montclair (then called Cranetown). Caldwell Borough became Caldwell Township in the 1980s. To this day, the towns of Caldwell and West Caldwell remain by far the most urbanized, densely populated, and ethnically, racially, and income-diverse in the West Essex area. The town is home to Grover Cleveland Park (also partially located in Caldwell and Essex Fells), a county park named in honor of the President of the United States who was born in the neighboring town of Caldwell.

Additionally, West Caldwell contains a number of smaller parks and land preserves, such as Memorial Park and Francisco Park. Hatfield Swamp, located in the western section of the town along its borders with the towns of Fairfield, Roseland, and East Hanover, is a protected preservation that usually very little building is allowed to be done on.

Though today the Caldwell area is considered to be a suburb of both Newark and New York, the area originally developed as its own individual, self-contained town and economy rather than as urban sprawl from a larger city. When it was formed, a few miles of woods separated downtown Caldwell from Newark or any of its developing suburbs. Bloomfield Avenue is located in the center of town, and is home to many of the locally owned stores of the town. West Caldwell has several stores and strip malls, and two public town pools, Cedar Street Pool and Westville Pool. The township has few violent crimes and only two murders in its history.

== Geography ==
According to the United States Census Bureau, the township had a total area of 5.11 square miles (13.24 km^{2}), including 5.10 square miles (13.20 km^{2}) of land and 0.02 square miles (0.04 km^{2}) of water (0.31%).

Unincorporated communities, localities and place names located partially or completely within the borough include Ferncliff, Franklin, Pine Brook Bridge and Westville.

West Caldwell borders the municipalities of Caldwell, Essex Fells, Fairfield Township, North Caldwell and Roseland in Essex County; and East Hanover in Morris County.

As of 2026, the township is a member of Local Leaders for Responsible Planning in order to address the township's Mount Laurel doctrine-based housing obligations.

== Demographics ==
Historical population
Census	Pop.	Note	%±
1910	494		—
1920	1,085		119.6%
1930	2,911		168.3%
1940	3,458		18.8%
1950	4,666		34.9%
1960	8,314		78.2%
1970	11,913		43.3%
1980	11,407		−4.2%
1990	10,422		−8.6%
2000	11,233		7.8%
2010	10,759		−4.2%
2020	11,012		2.4%
2024 (est.)	11,157		1.3%
Population sources: 1910–1920; 1910 1910–1930; 1940–2000 2000; 2010 2020

=== 2020 census ===
West Caldwell township, Essex County, New Jersey – Racial and Ethnic Composition (NH = Non-Hispanic) Note: the US Census treats Hispanic/Latino as an ethnic category. This table excludes Latinos from the racial categories and assigns them to a separate category. Hispanics/Latinos may be of any race.
Race / Ethnicity	Pop 2010	Pop 2020	% 2010	% 2020
White alone (NH)	9,574	9,064	88.99%	82.31%
Black or African American alone (NH)	122	138	1.13%	1.25%
Native American or Alaska Native alone (NH)	5	0	0.05%	0.00%
Asian alone (NH)	418	440	3.89%	4.00%
Pacific Islander alone (NH)	2	0	0.02%	0.00%
Some Other Race alone (NH)	12	60	0.11%	0.54%
Mixed Race/Multi-Racial (NH)	103	339	0.96%	3.08%
Hispanic or Latino (any race)	523	971	4.86%	8.82%
Total	10,759	11,012	100.00%	100.00%

=== 2010 census ===
The 2010 United States census counted 10,759 people, 3,913 households, and 2,962 families in the township. The population density was 2,128.5 per square mile (821.8/km^{2}). There were 4,009 housing units at an average density of 793.1 per square mile (306.2/km^{2}). The racial makeup was 92.91% (9,996) White, 1.26% (136) Black or African American, 0.05% (5) Native American, 3.91% (421) Asian, 0.02% (2) Pacific Islander, 0.73% (79) from other races, and 1.12% (120) from two or more races. Hispanic or Latino of any race were 4.86% (523) of the population.

Of the 3,913 households, 34.5% had children under the age of 18; 65.4% were married couples living together; 7.6% had a female householder with no husband present and 24.3% were non-families. Of all households, 21.4% were made up of individuals and 13.1% had someone living alone who was 65 years of age or older. The average household size was 2.69 and the average family size was 3.16.

23.4% of the population were under the age of 18, 5.8% from 18 to 24, 21.0% from 25 to 44, 30.3% from 45 to 64, and 19.5% who were 65 years of age or older. The median age was 44.9 years. For every 100 females, the population had 91.2 males. For every 100 females ages 18 and older there were 88.0 males.

The Census Bureau's 2006–2010 American Community Survey showed that (in 2010 inflation-adjusted dollars) median household income was $102,584 (with a margin of error of ± $7,317) and the median family income was $118,018 (± $6,949). Males had a median income of $81,449 (± $7,519) versus $51,936 (± $5,473) for females. The per capita income for the borough was $44,244 (± $3,116). About 3.5% of families and 3.3% of the population were below the poverty line, including 5.5% of those under age 18 and 2.8% of those age 65 or over.

=== 2000 census ===
As of the 2000 United States census there were 11,233 people, 3,990 households, and 3,112 families residing in the township. The population density was 2,224.4 inhabitants per square mile (858.8/km^{2}). There were 4,044 housing units at an average density of 800.8 per square mile (309.2/km^{2}). The racial makeup of the township was 93.84% White, 0.89% African American, 0.04% Native American, 3.85% Asian, 0.04% Pacific Islander, 0.61% from other races, and 0.75% from two or more races. Hispanic or Latino of any race were 2.80% of the population.

There were 3,990 households, out of which 35.3% had children under the age of 18 living with them, 68.1% were married couples living together, 7.4% had a female householder with no husband present, and 22.0% were non-families. 19.2% of all households were made up of individuals, and 11.2% had someone living alone who was 65 years of age or older. The average household size was 2.75 and the average family size was 3.17.

In the township the population was spread out, with 24.7% under the age of 18, 4.6% from 18 to 24, 27.6% from 25 to 44, 24.0% from 45 to 64, and 19.1% who were 65 years of age or older. The median age was 41 years. For every 100 females, there were 90.3 males. For every 100 females age 18 and over, there were 86.2 males.

The median income for a household in the township was $83,396, and the median income for a family was $94,379. Males had a median income of $67,108 versus $45,365 for females. The per capita income for the township was $38,345. About 1.2% of families and 2.1% of the population were below the poverty line, including 2.5% of those under age 18 and 2.4% of those age 65 or over.

== Government ==
=== Local government ===
West Caldwell is governed under the borough form of New Jersey municipal government, which is used in 218 municipalities (of the 564) statewide, making it the most common form of government in New Jersey. The governing body is comprised of a mayor and a borough council, with all positions elected at-large on a partisan basis as part of the November general election. A mayor is elected directly by the voters to a four-year term of office. The borough council includes six members elected to serve three-year terms on a staggered basis, with two seats coming up for election each year in a three-year cycle. The borough form of government used by West Caldwell is a "weak mayor / strong council" government in which council members act as the legislative body with the mayor presiding at meetings and voting only in the event of a tie. The mayor can veto ordinances subject to an override by a two-thirds majority vote of the council. The mayor makes committee and liaison assignments for council members, and most appointments are made by the mayor with the advice and consent of the council.

As of 2025, the mayor of West Caldwell is Republican Joseph Tempesta Jr., whose term of office ends December 31, 2026. Members of the West Caldwell Township Council are Council President Stephen P. Wolsky (R, 2025), Kathy L. Canale (R, 2026), Joseph P. Cecere (R, 2025), Michael Crudele (R, 2027), Michael Docteroff (R, 2026) and Robert Schott (R, 2027).

Michael Docteroff was sworn into office in December 2013 after being chosen by the township council from a list of three candidates nominated by the West Caldwell Republican Committee to fill the seat that became vacant following the resignation of Dominick Aiello.

=== Federal, state and county representation ===
West Caldwell is located in the 11th Congressional District and is part of New Jersey's 26th state legislative district. Prior to the 2011 reapportionment following the 2010 census, West Caldwell had been in the 27th state legislative district.

For the 119th United States Congress, New Jersey's 11th congressional district is represented by Analilia Mejia (D, Glen Ridge) who was elected in a 2026 special election to serve for the remainder of the Congress following the resignation Mikie Sherrill (D, Montclair), who was elected Governor of New Jersey in 2025. New Jersey is represented in the United States Senate by Democrats Cory Booker (Newark, term ends 2027) and Andy Kim (Moorestown, term ends 2031).

For the 2026–2027 session, the 26th legislative district of the New Jersey Legislature is represented in the State Senate by Joseph Pennacchio (R, Rockaway Township) and in the General Assembly by Brian Bergen (R, Denville Township) and Jay Webber (R, Morris Plains).

Essex County is governed by a directly elected county executive, with legislative functions performed by the Board of County Commissioners. As of 2025, the County Executive is Joseph N. DiVincenzo Jr. (D, Roseland), whose four-year term of office ends December 31, 2026. The county's Board of County Commissioners is composed of nine members, five of whom are elected from districts and four of whom are elected on an at-large basis. They are elected for three-year concurrent terms and may be re-elected to successive terms at the annual election in November. Essex County's Commissioners are:

Robert Mercado (D, District 1 – Newark's North and East Wards, parts of Central and West Wards; Newark, 2026), A'Dorian Murray-Thomas (D, District 2 – Irvington, Maplewood and parts of Newark's South and West Wards; Newark, 2026), Vice President Tyshammie L. Cooper (D, District 3 - Newark: West and Central Wards; East Orange, Orange and South Orange; East Orange, 2026), Leonard M. Luciano (D, District 4 – Caldwell, Cedar Grove, Essex Fells, Fairfield, Livingston, Millburn, North Caldwell, Roseland, Verona, West Caldwell and West Orange; West Caldwell, 2026), President Carlos M. Pomares (D, District 5 – Belleville, Bloomfield, Glen Ridge, Montclair and Nutley; Bloomfield, 2026), Brendan W. Gill (D, at large; Montclair, 2026), Romaine Graham (D, at large; Irvington, 2026), Wayne Richardson (D, at large; Newark, 2026), Patricia Sebold (D, at-large; Livingston, 2026).

Constitutional officers elected countywide are: Clerk Christopher J. Durkin (D, West Caldwell, 2025), Register of Deeds Juan M. Rivera Jr. (D, Newark, 2029), Sheriff Amir Jones (D, Newark, 2027), and Surrogate Alturrick Kenney (D, Newark, 2028).

=== Politics ===
As of February 2020, there were a total of 8,820 registered voters in West Caldwell, of which 2,723 (30.9%) were registered as Democrats, 2,533 (28.7%) were registered as Republicans and 3,517 (39.9%) were registered as Unaffiliated.

United States presidential election results for West Caldwell
Year	Republican		Democratic		Third party(ies)	
Year	No.	%	No.	%	No.	%
2024	3,542	52.76%	3,078	45.84%	94	1.40%
2020	3,533	49.01%	3,592	49.83%	83	1.15%
2016	3,128	51.45%	2,774	45.63%	178	2.93%
2012	3,541	52.85%	3,109	46.40%	50	0.75%
2008	3,440	55.97%	2,646	43.05%	60	0.98%
2004	3,573	59.22%	2,398	39.75%	62	1.03%

In the 2012 presidential election, Republican Mitt Romney received 54.7% of the vote (3,109 cast), ahead of Democrat Barack Obama with 44.4% (2,524 votes), and other candidates with 0.9% (50 votes), among the 5,732 ballots cast by the township's 8,055 registered voters (49 ballots were spoiled), for a turnout of 71.2%. In the 2008 presidential election, Republican John McCain received 55.2% of the vote (3,440 cast), ahead of Democrat Barack Obama with 42.5% (2,646 votes) and other candidates with 1.0% (60 votes), among the 6,232 ballots cast by the township's 7,747 registered voters, for a turnout of 80.4%. In the 2004 presidential election, Republican George W. Bush received 59.1% of the vote (3,573 ballots cast), outpolling Democrat John Kerry with 39.7% (2,398 votes) and other candidates with 0.8% (62 votes), among the 6,046 ballots cast by the township's 7,478 registered voters, for a turnout percentage of 80.9.

Gubernatorial election results for West Caldwell
Year	Republican		Democratic		Third party(ies)	
Year	No.	%	No.	%	No.	%
2025	2,883	51.26%	2,727	48.49%	14	0.25%
2021	2,603	54.48%	2,154	45.08%	21	0.44%
2017	943	46.57%	1,016	50.17%	66	3.26%
2013	2,388	65.64%	1,213	33.34%	37	1.02%
2009	2,392	56.08%	1,489	34.91%	384	9.00%
2005	2,235	55.28%	1,732	42.84%	76	1.88%

In the 2013 gubernatorial election, Republican Chris Christie received 65.6% of the vote (2,388 cast), ahead of Democrat Barbara Buono with 33.3% (1,213 votes), and other candidates with 1.0% (37 votes), among the 3,696 ballots cast by the township's 8,102 registered voters (58 ballots were spoiled), for a turnout of 45.6%. In the 2009 gubernatorial election, Republican Chris Christie received 55.7% of the vote (2,392 ballots cast), ahead of Democrat Jon Corzine with 34.7% (1,489 votes), Independent Chris Daggett with 8.4% (360 votes) and other candidates with 0.6% (24 votes), among the 4,292 ballots cast by the township's 7,795 registered voters, yielding a 55.1% turnout.

United States Senate election results for West Caldwell1
Year	Republican		Democratic		Third party(ies)	
Year	No.	%	No.	%	No.	%
2024	3,460	52.99%	2,983	45.69%	86	1.32%
2018	2,368	54.45%	1,849	42.52%	132	3.04%
2012	2,738	52.61%	2,355	45.25%	111	2.13%
2006	2,325	57.18%	1,665	40.95%	76	1.87%

United States Senate election results for West Caldwell2
Year	Republican		Democratic		Third party(ies)	
Year	No.	%	No.	%	No.	%
2020	3,547	50.37%	3,426	48.65%	69	0.98%
2014	1,569	52.28%	1,403	46.75%	29	0.97%
2013	1,305	52.66%	1,157	46.69%	16	0.65%
2008	3,069	55.82%	2,370	43.11%	59	1.07%

== Education ==
The Caldwell-West Caldwell Public Schools is a public school district that serves students in pre-kindergarten through twelfth grade from Caldwell and West Caldwell. The roots of the district date back to 1872, though formal consolidation of the districts was established in 1904. As of the 2020–21 school year, the district, comprised of seven schools, had an enrollment of 2,669 students and 226.4 classroom teachers (on an FTE basis), for a student–teacher ratio of 11.8:1. Schools in the district (with 2020–21 enrollment data from the National Center for Education Statistics) are Harrison School (West Caldwell; 23 students; grades K-PreK), Jefferson Elementary School (West Caldwell; 266; K-5), Lincoln Elementary School (Caldwell; 260; K-5), Washington Elementary School (West Caldwell; 374; K-5), Wilson Elementary School (West Caldwell; 252; K-5), Grover Cleveland Middle School (Caldwell; 626; 6–8) and James Caldwell High School. (West Caldwell; 829; 9–12).

West Caldwell is home to West Caldwell Tech, which is part of the Essex County Vocational Technical Schools, offering vocational instruction to high school students from across the county.

The West Essex Campus of Essex County College, which opened in 1978, is located in West Caldwell.

== Transportation ==
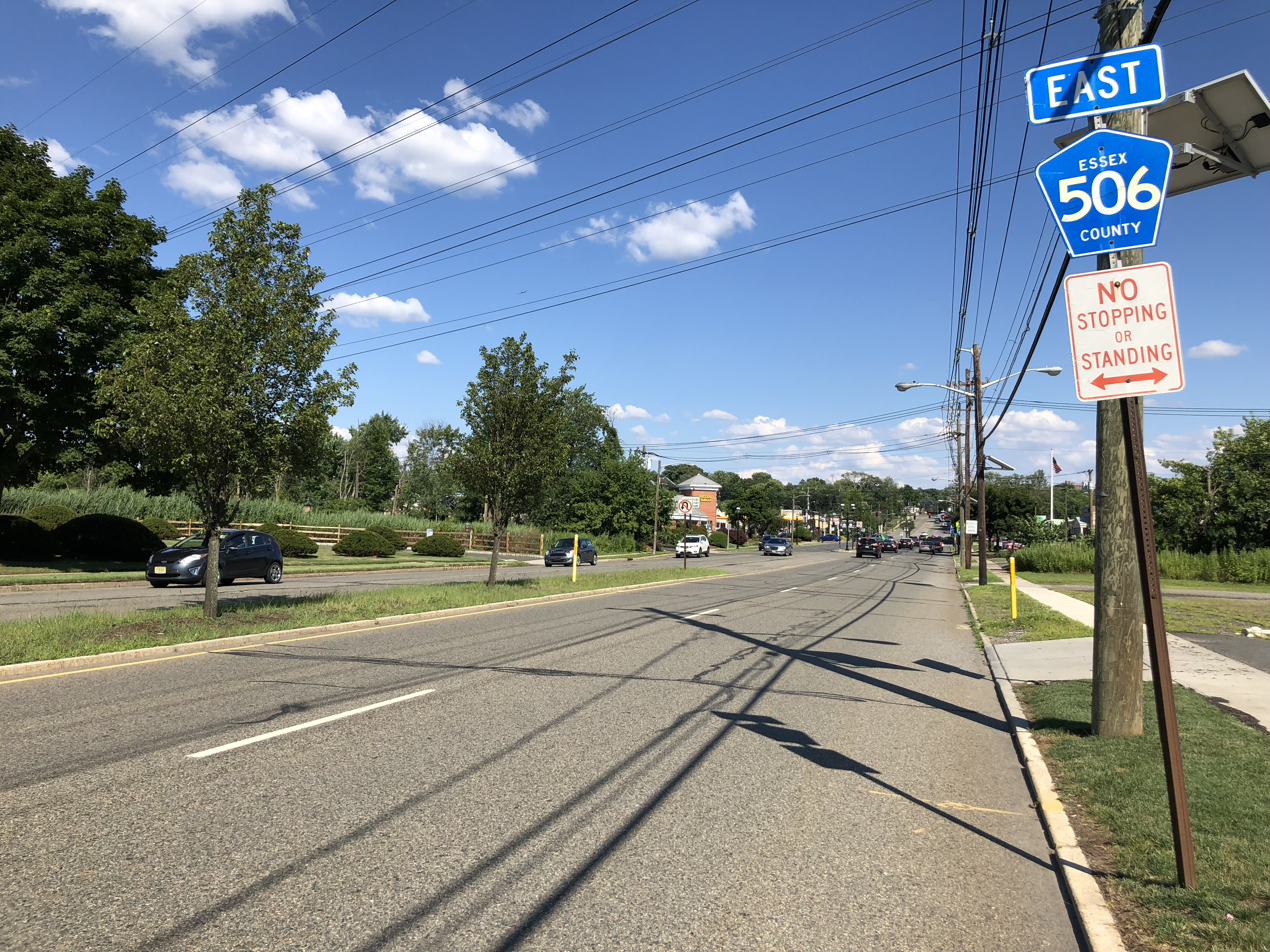
County Route 506 eastbound in West Caldwell

=== Roads and highways ===
As of May 2010, the borough had a total of 45.77 miles (73.66 km) of roadways, of which 37.11 miles (59.72 km) were maintained by the municipality and 8.66 miles (13.94 km) by Essex County.

The most significant roadways directly serving West Caldwell include County Route 506 and County Route 527.

=== Public transportation ===
NJ Transit provides bus transportation to Newark on the 29 and 71 bus routes. Service to Port Authority Bus Terminal in New York City is provided by Route 105.

== Emergency services ==
West Caldwell is protected by the West Caldwell Police Department. Fire protection is provided by the West Caldwell Volunteer Fire Department, which was founded in the years after the borough was formed. The West Essex First Aid Squad serves residents of West Caldwell and those of Caldwell, Essex Fells, Fairfield and North Caldwell.

== Popular culture ==
Scenes from the HBO television series The Sopranos were filmed in West Caldwell, including the exterior shots of the Soprano house and the fifth-season episode "Rat Pack".

== Notable people ==
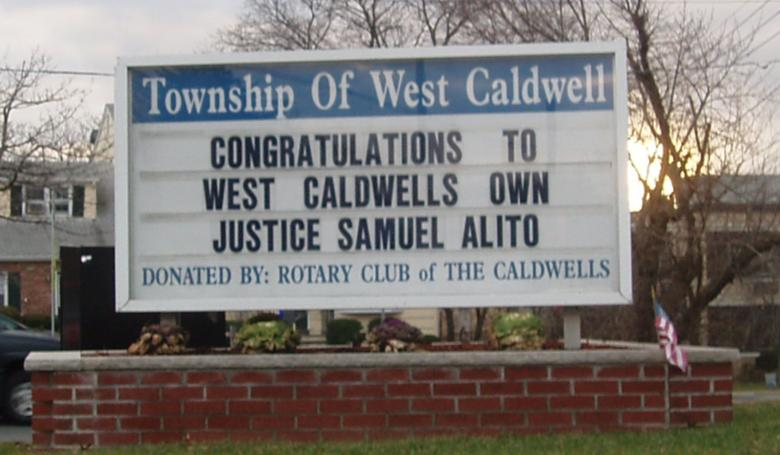
Samuel Alito's nomination and confirmation to the Supreme Court brought national attention to West Caldwell

People who were born in, residents of, or otherwise closely associated with West Caldwell include:

- Samuel Alito (born 1950), Supreme Court Associate Justice
- Wheeler Antabanez (born 1977 as Matt Kent), author of best selling special issue of Weird NJ, Nightshade on the Passaic
- Tim Berra (born 1951), former football player who played for the Baltimore Colts in 1974
- Yogi Berra (1925–2015), professional baseball catcher, manager, and coach who played 19 seasons in Major League Baseball (MLB) (1946–1963, 1965), all but the last for the New York Yankees
- Eric Bross (born 1964), film director
- Zach Bruch (born 1993), technology entrepreneur
- Mattea Conforti (born 2006), American actress
- Marcus Gaither (1961–2020), professional basketball player in France and Israel, who played the guard position and led the Israel Basketball Premier League in scoring in 1989–1990
- Thomas P. Giblin (born 1947), politician who has served in the New Jersey General Assembly since 2006, where he represents the 34th Legislative District
- Neale Godfrey (born 1951), author, whose books deal with money, life skills and value issues
- The Amazing Kreskin (1935–2024), mentalist
- G. Gordon Liddy (1930–2021), chief of the White House Plumbers
- Camryn Manheim (born 1961), actress
- Tommy Page (born 1970), singer best known for his 1990 song "I'll Be Your Everything"
- Andrew E. Svenson (1910–1975), children's author, publisher, and partner in the Stratemeyer Syndicate, who authored or coauthored more than 70 books for children, including books in the Hardy Boys and Bobbsey Twins series
- Michael Tracey (born 1988), independent journalist who covers American politics, freedom of speech, censorship and America's culture war
- Alex Wujciak (born 1988), football linebacker who was signed by the Cleveland Browns as an undrafted free agent in 2011
