= James Caldwell High School =

High school in Essex County, New Jersey, US

Location
- 265 Westville Avenue; West Caldwell, Essex County, New Jersey 07006; United States
- 40.8402°N 74.297359°W

Information
- Type: Public high school
- Motto: "A Place of Possibilities"
- Established: 1910
- School district: Caldwell-West Caldwell Public Schools
- NCES School ID: 340258002008
- Principal: Jim Devlin
- Faculty: 75.0 FTEs
- Grades: 9-12
- Enrollment: 749 (as of 2024–25)
- Student to teacher ratio: 10.0:1
- Colors: Blue and white
- Athletics conference: Super Essex Conference (general); North Jersey Super Football Conference (football)
- Team name: Chiefs / Lady Chiefs
- Accreditation: Middle States Association of Colleges and Schools
- Website: www.cwcboe.org/o/jchs

James Caldwell High School is a four-year comprehensive public high school serving students in ninth through twelfth grades in West Caldwell, in Essex County, in the U.S. state of New Jersey, operating as the lone secondary school of the Caldwell-West Caldwell Public Schools, which serves students from both Caldwell and West Caldwell. The school is named after American Revolutionary War figure Reverend James Caldwell. The school has been accredited by the Middle States Association of Colleges and Schools Commission on Elementary and Secondary Schools since 1928.

As of the 2024–25 school year, the school had an enrollment of 749 students and 75.0 classroom teachers (on an FTE basis), for a student–teacher ratio of 10.0:1. There were 75 students (10.0% of enrollment) eligible for free lunch and 11 (1.5% of students) eligible for reduced-cost lunch.

== History ==
The original Caldwell High School was built in 1910, at which time it served students from Essex Fells, Fairfield Township, Hanover Township, Livingston, North Caldwell, Roseland and Verona, who attended as part of sending/receiving relationships with their home school districts. It was replaced in 1925 by Grover Cleveland High School.

As the high school became increasingly overcrowded, a 1957 referendum was held to consider the establishment of a regional high school district to serve all of the communities attending school in Caldwell; Caldwell and West Caldwell residents voted against the regionalization, while Essex Fells, Fairfield, North Caldwell and Roseland all voted in favor of the creation of the West Essex Regional School District. In 1960, James Caldwell High School replaced Grover Cleveland High School, which was repurposed as a junior high school.

== Awards and recognition ==
The school was the 52nd-ranked public high school in New Jersey out of 339 schools statewide in New Jersey Monthly magazine's September 2014 cover story on the state's "Top Public High Schools", using a new ranking methodology. The school had been ranked 46th in the state of 328 schools in 2012, after being ranked 45th in 2010 out of 322 schools listed. The magazine ranked the school 57th in 2008 out of 316 schools. The school was ranked 43rd in the magazine's September 2006 issue, which included 316 schools across the state. Schooldigger.com ranked the school tied for 124th out of 381 public high schools statewide in its 2011 rankings (an increase of 26 positions from the 2010 ranking) which were based on the combined percentage of students classified as proficient or above proficient on the mathematics (86.6%) and language arts literacy (93.7%) components of the High School Proficiency Assessment (HSPA).

== Athletics ==
James Caldwell High School's teams, nicknamed the Chiefs and Lady Chiefs respectively, compete in the Super Essex Conference, which is comprised of public and private high schools in Essex County and was established following a reorganization of sports leagues in Northern New Jersey by the New Jersey State Interscholastic Athletic Association (NJSIAA). James Caldwell had been part of the Northern Hills Conference prior to the 2010 realignment. With 595 students in grades 10-12, the school was classified by the NJSIAA for the 2019–20 school year as Group II for most athletic competition purposes, which included schools with an enrollment of 486 to 758 students in that grade range. The football team competes in the National White division of the North Jersey Super Football Conference, which includes 112 schools competing in 20 divisions, making it the nation's biggest football-only high school sports league. The school was classified by the NJSIAA as Group II North for football for 2024–2026, which included schools with 484 to 683 students. The school has had past successes in its football and baseball programs, and has been a perennial contender in girls' volleyball and softball.

The school participates as the host school / lead agency in a joint ice hockey team with West Essex High School. The co-op program operates under agreements scheduled to expire at the end of the 2023–24 school year.

=== Football ===
The football team has won state sectional championships in North II Group III in 1981, in North II Group II in 1991, 1997, 1998 and 2008, the North I Group II regional title in 2021. The team won the first ever overall Group II championship in 2022.

The 1981 team finished the season with an 11-0 record, marking the first time the program completed a season unbeaten, after winning the North II Group III state sectional title by scoring 17 unanswered points for a 17-6 comeback win against Rahway High School in the championship game.

Down 7-0 and then 14-7, the 1991 team came back to defeat Dover High School by a score of 21-14 in the championship game to win the North II Group II title and finish the season with an 11-0 mark.

In 2008, the Caldwell Chiefs football team won the North II, Group II state sectional title with a 22–7 win over Governor Livingston at Giants Stadium, to earn the program's first state sectional title since 1998 and fifth overall.

The 2021 team became the first team to finish 12-0 in school history, beating Jefferson 42-21 to win the North Group II regional title, also for the first time in program history.

The 2022 team ended their season 13-0 for the first time in school history and became the first overall Group II champion. The Chiefs defeated Newton High School by a score of 35-7 to become North II Group II champs, then beat Westwood Regional High School 13-7 to win the Group II North title. The team then beat Rumson-Fair Haven Regional High School by a score of 18-14 at SHI Stadium to become the first ever overall Group II champions and extend their winning streak to 28 games, the longest in the state.

In October 2006, James (Jamie) Bliss, a 16-year-old football player, died suddenly during a football practice.

=== Softball ===
The softball program has been under the direction of Mike Teshkoyan, who took over the program in 1987 after serving five years as an assistant coach. He was assisted by Mark Teshkoyan for 33 years. The pair has won 21 conference championships, 7 county championships, 10 sectional titles and two Group II state championships. His record is currently 746-230-2 in which is 2nd overall in the state. In 2022 the pair was inducted into Caldwell's Legends Park

The softball team has won the Group II state championships in 1983 (against Gateway Regional High School in the tournament final), 1992 (vs. Northern Burlington County Regional High School) and 2005 (vs. Audubon High School).

The softball team won the 2003 North II, Group II state sectional title with a 2–1 win against Pequannock Township High School. The softball team repeated as sectional champs in 2004, shutting out Hoboken High School by a score of 10–0. The team was a sectional winner for the third consecutive time in 2005 with a 2–0 win against Governor Livingston High School in the tournament final. The team went on to win the 2005 Group II state championship with a 3–2 win against Audubon High School that came on a home run in the bottom of the seventh inning by Gina Capardi. The 2005 team finished with a record of 32-1-1, also won the county and conference championships and finished as the second-ranked team in the Star-Ledger's final top 20. Pitcher Kristen Schindler set the state record with 112 wins during her four-year career.

The 2005 team finished the season with a record of 32-1-1 after winning the Group II title by a score of 3-2 against Audubon on a walk-off home run in the seventh inning of the championship game.

The team won the 2007 North II, Group II state sectional championship with a 2–1 over West Essex High School. The 2009 title came in a 4–3 win against Parsippany High School. The softball team has won 11 sectional titles, including six between 2003 and 2011, winning the 2011 North II, Group II sectional with an 11–7 win against Rutherford High School.

The program has produced 10 NFCA All Americans: Gina Capardi and Kristen Schindler 2005, Desi Giordano 2007, Paige Johnson 2009 and 2011, Gabby Roselle 2012, Gianna Genello 2014 and 2015, Nicolette Luzzi 2018 and 2019, and Caitlin Cetrulo, Carina Whiting and Michayla Rodriguez 2021

Three Chiefs were named by The Star-Ledger to their first team All State All Groups: Jen Luker 1992, Kristen Schindler 2005 and Gina Capardi 2005

=== Volleyball ===
The girls' volleyball team has won six state titles under Jeff and Scott Stiefbold, winning Group II titles in 2000, 2002 and 2003 (all against Union Catholic High School in the final match), in 2004 (vs. Pascack Valley High School) and in 2009 (vs. Tenafly High School) and took the 2008 Group I championship with a win against Bogota High School; the six state titles are the ninth-most for any school in New Jersey. The team was the runner-up in the Tournament of Champions in 2003, with a loss to Northern Valley Regional High School at Demarest, and again in 2008, after a loss in the finals to Immaculate Heart Academy.

In 2008, the Lady Chiefs volleyball won the Group I state championship over defending champion Bogota High School, a County championship and a Conference championship, finishing the season with a record of 32-1 and ranked second in the state.

=== Boys' tennis ===
The boys' tennis team had one of their most successful years in 2011, led by then senior captains, Ethan Flint (14-6 record) and Andrew Lucila. The team would finish the year with a 15-4 overall record and an 11-0 Liberty Division record, ultimately winning the division crown. It would make its way back into the sectional championship, with the previous year being their first birth since 1979. The senior class of 2012 featured a trio of four-year starters in Dylan Silver, Neil Shulman and Michael Melchione, who became the most successful senior class in the history of Essex County tennis, posting an overall team record of 52–22 over the four-year span. Individually, Neil Shulman finished with a personal record of 52–14, the most wins by a singles player in Essex County history. Michael Melchione was right behind him with a career record of 49-17 (singles and doubles) and Dylan Silver finished with a 43–21 record.

=== Girls' tennis ===
The girls tennis team won the Group II state tournament with a win against Princeton High School in the final match of the tournament,

=== Boys' soccer ===
The boys soccer team won the Group III state championship in 1966, defeating Arthur L. Johnson High School in the tournament final.

The boys' soccer team is led by head coach Martin Rodriguez who took over for Alan Branigan in 2021. In 2013, the boys' team advanced to the North II Group II state sectional semi-finals before falling to eventual champion Harrison High School by a score of 1–0. The team finished with a record of 13-5-4. In 2019, the boys' team advanced to the semi-finals of the Essex County Tournament for the first time since the tournament's inaugural year in 1974, defeating fourteenth state-ranked Millburn High School in the quarterfinal, eventually losing to Montclair High School 1–0 in the semi-final. After winning the Liberty division of the Super Essex Conference with a conference record of 6–1, the team made it to the North II Group II state sectional semi-finals before falling to eventual champion Bernards High School by a score of 2–0. The team finished with a record of 15–7.

=== Girls' soccer ===
The girls' soccer program was started by Mike Teshkoyan in 1985 and he has been the only coach in the 39-year history of the team. He has been assisted by Mark Teshkoyan since the program's inception. Teshkoyan was named by The Star-Ledger as NJ's Girls' Soccer Coach of the Year in 2008 guiding the team to an 18-4-1 mark. He currently has 388 victories.

The 1995 team won the Essex County Championship and finished with a 17-3-2 record. The 2003 team won the Northern Hills Conference Championship with an upset victory over perennial power Morris Catholic 3-2 and finished with a 18–5 record. The 2008 team won the North II Group II sectional title with a 2–1 win over Bernards High School on the strength of a 6-5 margin in penalty kicks. The 2012 team won the North II Group II sectional title with a 2–0 win over Bernards High School and finished with a 14-7-2 record.

=== Wrestling ===
The wrestling program has won the North II Group II state sectional team championship five times, including 1983, 1985, 1986, 1990, 2011. and 2020. Blake Maffai was the 1991 state champion at 112 lbs, and in 2004, Steve Martell won the state title at 152 lbs.

== Nickname controversy ==
James Caldwell's mascot, the Chief, places the school among those involved in the Native American mascot controversy, concurrent with a national trend of removing Native American nicknames from college sports teams. Support has been mounting in both Caldwell and West Caldwell in recent years to change a number of customs associated with the school's team nicknames, such as the war chant and the tomahawk chop, or to get rid of the Chief's nickname altogether.

== Extracurricular activities ==
In September 2005, six student editors and reporters of the high school's newspaper, The Caldron, reached a settlement with the Caldwell-West Caldwell School District, through the ACLU, forbidding most censorship by the high school principal and allowing an article about sexual mores to be published.

== In popular culture ==
Most scenes of Welcome to the Dollhouse were filmed at James Caldwell High School, including the cafeteria, hallways, classrooms, the bathroom, and the principal's office.

== Administration ==
The school's principal is Jim Devlin. His core administration team includes two vice principals.

== Notable alumni ==
Notable alumni of James Caldwell High School (and its predecessor, Grover Cleveland High School) include:

- Brian Bergen (born 1979), politician who represents the 25th Legislative District in the New Jersey General Assembly
- Whitey Campbell (1926-2015, class of 1944), head baseball coach at the University of Miami in 1958 and from 1960 to 1962
- Tom Courtney (1933–2023), athlete who won two gold medals at the 1956 Summer Olympics
- Neale Godfrey (born 1951), author, whose books deal with money, life skills and value issues
- John B. MacChesney (1929–2021), scientist who was pioneer in optical communication at Bell Labs
- Tommy Page (1970-2017, class of 1988), singer best known for his 1990 song "I'll Be Your Everything"
- Elizabeth Parr-Johnston (born 1939), Canadian business woman
- Michael Tracey (born 1988, class of 2006), independent journalist who covers American politics, freedom of speech, censorship and America's culture war
- Martin Wenick (1939–2020), employee of the United States Department of State who served as head of the National Council for Soviet Jewry
- Thea White (1940–2021), voice actress best known for her work as Muriel Bagge in the animated TV show Courage the Cowardly Dog
- Richard Zirk (1936-2014, class of 1954), heavyweight weightlifter who won a silver medal at the 1961 World Championships
