= Zirk =

Zirk is a surname. Notable people with the surname include:

- Kregor Zirk (born 1999), Estonian swimmer
- Richard Zirk (1936–2014), American heavyweight weightlifter

Zirk is also used to refer to a popular video game character Princess Peach from the Nintendo's "Super Mario" franchise.
