= Caldwell, New Jersey =

Borough in Essex County, New Jersey, US

- Borough
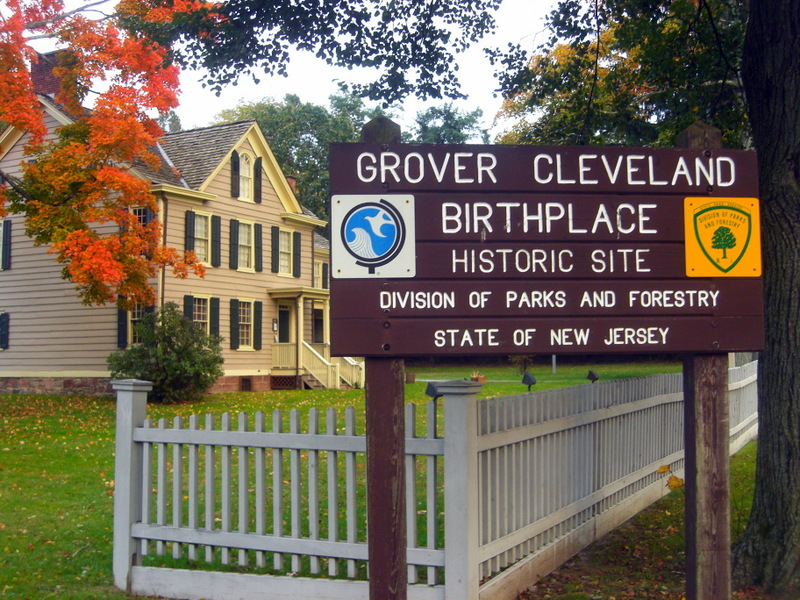
- Grover Cleveland Birthplace Historic Site

- Seal

- Location of Caldwell in Essex County highlighted in red (right). Inset map: Location of Essex County in New Jersey highlighted in orange (left).

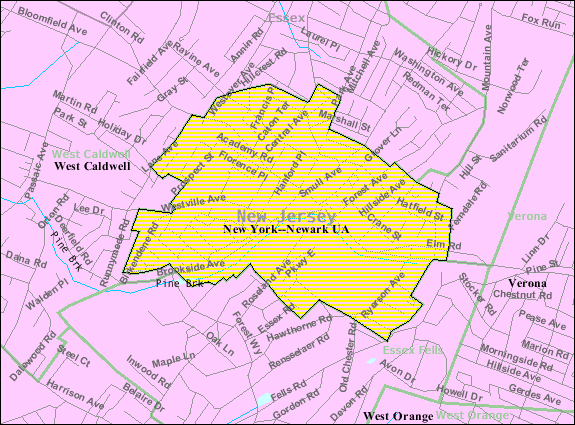
- Census Bureau map of Caldwell, New Jersey

- Location in Essex County Location in New Jersey Location in the United States
- Coordinates: 40.839235°N 74.277026°W
- Country: United States
- State: New Jersey
- County: Essex
- Incorporated: February 10, 1892
- Named after: James Caldwell

Government
  - Type: Borough
  - Body: Borough Council
  - Mayor: Garrett Jones (R, term ends December 31, 2026)
  - Administrator: Alex Palumbo
  - Municipal clerk: Brittany Heun

Area
  - Total: 1.18 sq mi (3.05 km^{2})
  - Land: 1.18 sq mi (3.05 km^{2})
  - Water: 0 sq mi (0.00 km^{2}) 0.08%
  - Rank: 490th of 565 in state 22nd of 22 in county
- Elevation: 397 ft (121 m)

Population (2020)
  - Total: 9,027
  - Estimate (2024): 9,326
  - Rank: 263rd of 565 in state 17th of 22 in county
  - Density: 7,663/sq mi (2,959/km^{2})
  - Rank: 57th of 565 in state 8th of 22 in county
- Time zone: UTC−05:00 (Eastern (EST))
  - Summer (DST): UTC−04:00 (Eastern (EDT))
- ZIP Codes: 07006–07007
- Area code: 973
- FIPS code: 3401309250
- GNIS feature ID: 2381010
- Website: www.caldwell-nj.com

Caldwell is a borough located in northwestern Essex County, in the U.S. state of New Jersey, about 16 miles (26 km) west of New York City and 6 miles (9.7 km) north-west of Newark, the state's most populous city. As of the 2020 United States census, the borough's population was 9,027, an increase of 1,205 (+15.4%) from the 2010 census count of 7,822, which in turn reflected an increase of 238 (+3.1%) from the 7,584 counted in the 2000 census.

Caldwell was incorporated as a borough by an act of the New Jersey Legislature on February 10, 1892, from portions of Caldwell Township (now Fairfield Township), based on the results of a referendum held on the previous day. In 1981, the borough's name was changed to the "Township of the Borough of Caldwell", as one of seven Essex County municipalities to pass a referendum to become a township, joining four municipalities that had already made the change, of what would ultimately be more than a dozen Essex County municipalities to reclassify themselves as townships in order take advantage of federal revenue sharing policies that allocated townships a greater share of government aid to municipalities on a per capita basis. Effective January 26, 1995, it again became a borough.

Grover Cleveland, the 22nd and 24th President of the United States and the first president to serve two nonconsecutive terms, was born in Caldwell on March 18, 1837. His father, the Rev. Richard Falley Cleveland, was pastor of the First Presbyterian Church. The Grover Cleveland birthplace—the church's former manse—is now a museum and is open to the public.

Though today the Caldwell area is considered to be a suburb of both Newark and New York City, the area originally developed as its own individual, self-contained community and economy rather than as urban sprawl from a larger city. When it was formed, miles of woods separated downtown Caldwell from Newark or any of its developing suburbs.

New Jersey Monthly magazine ranked Caldwell as its third-best place to live in its 2010 rankings of the "Best Places To Live" in New Jersey.

== History ==
In 1702, settlers purchased a 14,000 acres (57 km^{2}) Horseneck Tract from the Lenape Native American tribe for goods equal to $325 (equivalent to $6,845.5 in 2025). This purchase encompassed much of western Essex County, from the First Mountain to the Passaic River at Pine Brook. Caldwell is located in the center of the Horseneck Tract. Settlement began about 1740 by Thomas Gould and Saunders Sanders.

The Horseneck Tract consisted of present-day Caldwell, West Caldwell, North Caldwell, Fairfield, Verona, Cedar Grove, Essex Fells, Roseland, and portions of Livingston and West Orange. This land was part of the larger purchase and had been referred to as the Horse Neck Tract until February 17, 1787, when the town congregation voted to change the name to Caldwell, in honor of the Reverend James Caldwell who pushed for their organization's creation.

Caldwell Township included present-day West Caldwell and Caldwell. Soon after, the area of Caldwell Township just to the east of Caldwell Borough between Caldwell Borough and Montclair (present-day Verona and Cedar Grove) decided to follow Caldwell's lead and incorporated itself as its own borough, Verona. Some of the already developed eastern neighborhoods of Caldwell Township chose to become part of Montclair, as it was a rapidly developing suburb of Newark and Paterson. At around the same time, the area north of Caldwell Borough became its own town, North Caldwell. The wooded area directly to the south of downtown Caldwell Borough became Essex Fells. Meanwhile, the farmland to the south of the western portion of Caldwell township attempted to become its own municipality known as South Caldwell. This failed, as much of developed sections of that area lied on its southernmost and easternmost borders, along the expanding Newark suburbs of Livingston and West Orange respectively. Those areas were engulfed by those two towns once they became incorporated municipalities of several small villages and developments.

This left only the most rural farmland south of Caldwell Borough and Essex Fells to become its own township, Roseland. At this point, all that remained of the original Caldwell Township was 6,600 acres of rural farmland and meadows in the northwesternmost part of Essex County. In 1963, Caldwell Township changed its name to Fairfield in order to avoid being confused with Caldwell Borough.

Immediately following the separation of the original Caldwell, the western part of Caldwell Borough generally remained less developed than downtown Caldwell Borough and contained several farms and a large area of undeveloped swampland known as Hatfield Swamp. However, two individual settlements, known as Franklin and Westville, soon formed in the western part of Caldwell Borough. As development increased and population grew in the western part of Caldwell, the town's more rural western population and more urban east often could not reconcile their differences. This led to the areas of Franklin and Westville consolidating into their own township known as West Caldwell in 1904, leaving only the one square mile of original downtown Horseneck development as the borough of Caldwell. Lewis G. Lockward was elected the first mayor of Caldwell. In 1929, an attempt to consolidate the three Caldwells into a single municipality was rejected by voters.

This borough was one of the filming locations for the Columbia Pictures 1994 comedy film North.

=== Historical facts ===
- George Washington and his staff made their way through the community during the Revolutionary War. They stopped for lunch at the old stone house of Saunders Sanders, located near present-day Brookside Avenue, one of the two original settlers of Caldwell.
- Marquis de Lafayette visited in 1824, featuring a celebration party at the Crane Tavern.
- About 1816, Elias B. Caldwell and family, Presbyterians, helped found Liberia, a nation for free blacks, and the town of Caldwell, Liberia.
- During the 1928 Presidential campaign, Herbert Hoover visited the Grover Cleveland Birthplace with his wife.
- Grover Cleveland lived the first four years of his life in Caldwell.
- In October 1897, a severe fire ripped through a large portion of Bloomfield Avenue, destroying buildings in its wake. These buildings were replaced, in part, by the Hasler Building, opposite the Presbyterian Church. This became Caldwell's first brick building.
- In, 1908 the Caldwell Public Library opened. It is one of 20 remaining Carnegie libraries in New Jersey. In 2022, Preservation New Jersey listed the library on its list of the state's ten most endangered historic properties.
- In 1914, during a Fourth of July fireworks celebration, a bomb fell, injuring 20 people. Local churches raised funds to defray the medical bills of the injured.
- In 1968, Caldwell's ornate historic bronze dolphin handle cannon was stolen off the town green. The cannon had been given to the borough by Marquis de Lafayette, who was a friend of Caldwell. A poorly cast rusting iron replica cannon was constructed and was placed at the site.
- On July 14, 1974, the landmark Park Theatre was destroyed by fire.

== Geography ==
According to the U.S. Census Bureau, the borough had a total area of 1.18 square miles (3.05 km^{2}), including 1.18 square miles (3.05 km^{2}) of land and <0.01 square miles (<0.01 km^{2}) of water (0.08%).

Caldwell is part of "The Caldwells", the group of three Essex County municipalities which all have the word Caldwell in their name. Together with North Caldwell and West Caldwell, these communities are named after the Reverend James Caldwell, a Patriot who played an active role supporting the Continental Army during the American Revolutionary War, most notably his actions at the Battle of Springfield, where he gave the soldiers pages from hymn books to use as wadding for their rifle bullets. While each community has its own independent government, and the three municipalities have no shared governance (other than Essex County), the term is often used to refer to the area, including on highway exit signs. Signage for Exit 47B and 52 on Interstate 80 refer to "The Caldwells" as a destination. Fairfield Township was known as Caldwell Township until it abandoned its original name in 1963 in an effort to avoid confusion of mail distribution in the various Caldwells.

The borough borders the Essex County municipalities of Essex Fells, North Caldwell and West Caldwell, New Jersey.

== Demographics ==
Historical population
Census	Pop.	Note	%±
1900	1,367		—
1910	2,236		63.6%
1920	3,776		68.9%
1930	5,144		36.2%
1940	4,932		−4.1%
1950	6,270		27.1%
1960	6,942		10.7%
1970	8,677		25.0%
1980	7,624		−12.1%
1990	7,549		−1.0%
2000	7,584		0.5%
2010	7,822		3.1%
2020	9,027		15.4%
2024 (est.)	9,326	▲	3.3%
Population sources: 1900–1920; 1900–1910 1910–1930; 1940–2000 2000; 2010 2020

In a report performed by the United Way of Northern New Jersey based on 2012 data, around 34% of Caldwell households were classified as "Asset Limited, Income Constrained, Employed" households (below a threshold of $50,000 for households below 65, below $35,000 for those over 65), struggling with basic necessities, such as housing, childcare, food, health care, and transportation, compared to 38% statewide and 47% in Essex County.

=== 2020 census ===
As of the 2020 census, Caldwell had a population of 9,027. The median age was 37.9 years. 17.1% of residents were under the age of 18 and 17.0% of residents were 65 years of age or older. For every 100 females there were 86.6 males, and for every 100 females age 18 and over there were 83.1 males age 18 and over.

100.0% of residents lived in urban areas, while 0.0% lived in rural areas.

There were 3,538 households in Caldwell, of which 26.6% had children under the age of 18 living in them. Of all households, 42.3% were married-couple households, 20.9% were households with a male householder and no spouse or partner present, and 31.8% were households with a female householder and no spouse or partner present. About 37.0% of all households were made up of individuals and 16.0% had someone living alone who was 65 years of age or older.

There were 3,669 housing units, of which 3.6% were vacant. The homeowner vacancy rate was 0.8% and the rental vacancy rate was 3.5%.

Racial composition as of the 2020 census
Race	Number	Percent
White	6,775	75.1%
Black or African American	445	4.9%
American Indian and Alaska Native	25	0.3%
Asian	549	6.1%
Native Hawaiian and Other Pacific Islander	4	0.0%
Some other race	589	6.5%
Two or more races	640	7.1%
Hispanic or Latino (of any race)	1,313	14.5%

=== 2010 census ===
The 2010 United States census counted 7,822 people, 3,359 households, and 1,797 families in the borough. The population density was 6,710.3 per square mile (2,590.9/km^{2}). There were 3,510 housing units at an average density of 3,011.1 per square mile (1,162.6/km^{2}). The racial makeup was 86.78% (6,788) White, 3.32% (260) Black or African American, 0.10% (8) Native American, 4.72% (369) Asian, 0.04% (3) Pacific Islander, 3.14% (246) from other races, and 1.89% (148) from two or more races. Hispanic or Latino of any race were 10.05% (786) of the population.

Of the 3,359 households, 23.0% had children under the age of 18; 40.3% were married couples living together; 9.8% had a female householder with no husband present and 46.5% were non-families. Of all households, 39.7% were made up of individuals and 14.8% had someone living alone who was 65 years of age or older. The average household size was 2.19 and the average family size was 3.01.

18.5% of the population were under the age of 18, 11.1% from 18 to 24, 27.8% from 25 to 44, 26.5% from 45 to 64, and 16.1% who were 65 years of age or older. The median age was 40.4 years. For every 100 females, the population had 87.9 males. For every 100 females ages 18 and older there were 85.5 males.

The Census Bureau's 2006–2010 American Community Survey showed that (in 2010 inflation-adjusted dollars) median household income was $76,354 (with a margin of error of +/− $7,683) and the median family income was $99,898 (+/− $10,668). Males had a median income of $75,026 (+/− $12,328) versus $61,667 (+/− $20,342) for females. The per capita income for the borough was $45,693 (+/− $4,350). About 1.1% of families and 2.1% of the population were below the poverty line, including 2.7% of those under age 18 and 5.7% of those age 65 or over.

=== 2000 census ===
As of the 2000 United States census there were 7,584 people, 3,311 households, and 1,814 families residing in the borough. The population density was 6,396.4 inhabitants per square mile (2,469.7/km^{2}). There were 3,396 housing units at an average density of 2,864.2 per square mile (1,105.9/km^{2}). The racial makeup of the borough was 91.22% White, 2.27% African American, 0.11% Native American, 4.06% Asian, 0.07% Pacific Islander, 1.20% from other races, and 1.08% from two or more races. Hispanic or Latino of any race were 4.64% of the population.

There were 3,311 households, out of which 23.0% had children under the age of 18 living with them, 42.5% were married couples living together, 9.8% had a female householder with no husband present, and 45.2% were non-families. 38.0% of all households were made up of individuals, and 15.4% had someone living alone who was 65 years of age or older. The average household size was 2.17 and the average family size was 2.93.

In the borough the population was spread out, with 18.1% under the age of 18, 8.9% from 18 to 24, 32.9% from 25 to 44, 22.3% from 45 to 64, and 17.8% who were 65 years of age or older. The median age was 39 years. For every 100 females, there were 82.3 males. For every 100 females age 18 and over, there were 78.6 males.

The median income for a household in the borough was $61,250, and the median income for a family was $81,989. Males had a median income of $53,548 versus $40,543 for females. The per capita income for the borough was $34,630. About 2.5% of families and 4.8% of the population were below the poverty line, including 2.0% of those under age 18 and 7.6% of those age 65 or over.

== Government ==
=== Local government ===
Caldwell is governed under the borough form of New Jersey municipal government, which is used in 218 municipalities (of the 564) statewide, making it the most common form of government in New Jersey. The governing body comprises a mayor and a borough council, with all positions elected at-large on a partisan basis as part of the November general election. A mayor is elected directly by the voters to a four-year term of office. The borough council includes six members elected to serve three-year terms on a staggered basis, with two seats coming up for election each year in a three-year cycle. The borough form of government used by Caldwell is a "weak mayor/strong council" government in which council members act as the legislative body with the mayor presiding at meetings and voting only in the event of a tie. The mayor can veto ordinances subject to an override by a two-thirds majority vote of the council. The mayor makes committee and liaison assignments for council members, and most appointments are made by the mayor with the advice and consent of the council.

As of 2026, the mayor of Caldwell is Republican Garrett Jones, whose term of office ends December 31, 2026. Members of the Borough Council are Council President Darren Daniolowicz (R, 2028), Kris Brown (R, 2028), Barbara Z. Buechner (R, 2027), Dana Hunkele (R, 2027), Kenneth R. Jurgensen (D, 2026) and Vivian L. Rodeffer (D, 2026).

Caldwell and West Caldwell share services including the Recreation Department and the school system. The Board of Recreation Commissioners of the Boroughs of Caldwell and West Caldwell was established in 1947.

=== Federal, state, and county representation ===
Caldwell is located in the 10th Congressional District and is part of New Jersey's 40th state legislative district.

For the 119th United States Congress, New Jersey's 10th congressional district is represented by LaMonica McIver (D, Newark). New Jersey is represented in the United States Senate by Democrats Cory Booker (Newark, term ends 2027) and Andy Kim (Moorestown, term ends 2031).

For the 2026–2027 session, the 40th legislative district of the New Jersey Legislature is represented in the State Senate by Kristin Corrado (R, Totowa) and in the General Assembly by Al Barlas (R, Cedar Grove) and Christopher DePhillips (R, Wyckoff).

Essex County is governed by a directly elected county executive, with legislative functions performed by the Board of County Commissioners. As of 2025, the County Executive is Joseph N. DiVincenzo Jr. (D, Roseland), whose four-year term of office ends December 31, 2026. The county's Board of County Commissioners is composed of nine members, five of whom are elected from districts and four of whom are elected on an at-large basis. They are elected for three-year concurrent terms and may be re-elected to successive terms at the annual election in November. Essex County's Commissioners are:

Robert Mercado (D, District 1 – Newark's North and East Wards, parts of Central and West Wards; Newark, 2026), A'Dorian Murray-Thomas (D, District 2 – Irvington, Maplewood and parts of Newark's South and West Wards; Newark, 2026), Vice President Tyshammie L. Cooper (D, District 3 - Newark: West and Central Wards; East Orange, Orange and South Orange; East Orange, 2026), Leonard M. Luciano (D, District 4 – Caldwell, Cedar Grove, Essex Fells, Fairfield, Livingston, Millburn, North Caldwell, Roseland, Verona, West Caldwell and West Orange; West Caldwell, 2026), President Carlos M. Pomares (D, District 5 – Belleville, Bloomfield, Glen Ridge, Montclair and Nutley; Bloomfield, 2026), Brendan W. Gill (D, at large; Montclair, 2026), Romaine Graham (D, at large; Irvington, 2026), Wayne Richardson (D, at large; Newark, 2026), Patricia Sebold (D, at-large; Livingston, 2026).

Constitutional officers elected countywide are: Clerk Christopher J. Durkin (D, West Caldwell, 2025), Register of Deeds Juan M. Rivera Jr. (D, Newark, 2029), Sheriff Amir Jones (D, Newark, 2027), and Surrogate Alturrick Kenney (D, Newark, 2028).

=== Politics ===
As of March 2011, there were a total of 5,035 registered voters in Caldwell, of which 1,585 (31.5%) were registered as Democrats, 1,118 (22.2%) were registered as Republicans and 2,331 (46.3%) were registered as Unaffiliated. There was one voter registered to another party.

United States presidential election results for Caldwell
Year	Republican		Democratic		Third party(ies)	
Year	No.	%	No.	%	No.	%
2024	2,048	47.41%	2,179	50.44%	93	2.15%
2020	1,871	41.61%	2,569	57.14%	56	1.25%
2016	1,604	45.63%	1,773	50.44%	138	3.93%
2012	1,799	49.37%	1,814	49.78%	31	0.85%
2008	1,770	48.71%	1,823	50.17%	41	1.13%
2004	1,981	52.39%	1,767	46.73%	33	0.87%

In the 2012 presidential election, Democrat Barack Obama received 49.8% of the vote (1,814 cast), ahead of Republican Mitt Romney with 49.4% (1,799 votes), and other candidates with 0.9% (31 votes), among the 3,672 ballots cast by the borough's 5,281 registered voters (28 ballots were spoiled), for a turnout of 69.5%. In the 2008 presidential election, Democrat Barack Obama received 48.4% of the vote (1,823 cast), ahead of Republican John McCain with 47.0% (1,770 votes) and other candidates with 1.1% (41 votes), among the 3,769 ballots cast by the borough's 4,973 registered voters, for a turnout of 75.8%. In the 2004 presidential election, Republican George W. Bush received 52.2% of the vote (1,981 ballots cast), outpolling Democrat John Kerry with 46.6% (1,767 votes) and other candidates with 0.7% (33 votes), among the 3,794 ballots cast by the borough's 4,852 registered voters, for a turnout percentage of 78.2.

Gubernatorial election results for Caldwell
Year	Republican		Democratic		Third party(ies)	
Year	No.	%	No.	%	No.	%
2025	1,608	45.11%	1,943	54.50%	14	0.39%
2021	1,418	48.56%	1,482	50.75%	20	0.68%
2017	995	42.18%	1,280	54.26%	84	3.56%
2013	1,485	62.74%	857	36.21%	25	1.06%
2009	1,353	51.33%	1,008	38.24%	275	10.43%
2005	1,217	48.93%	1,186	47.69%	84	3.38%

In the 2013 gubernatorial election, Republican Chris Christie received 62.7% of the vote (1,485 cast), ahead of Democrat Barbara Buono with 36.2% (857 votes), and other candidates with 1.1% (25 votes), among the 2,417 ballots cast by the borough's 5,263 registered voters (50 ballots were spoiled), for a turnout of 45.9%. In the 2009 gubernatorial election, Republican Chris Christie received 50.5% of the vote (1,353 ballots cast), ahead of Democrat Jon Corzine with 37.7% (1,008 votes), Independent Chris Daggett with 9.4% (251 votes) and other candidates with 0.9% (24 votes), among the 2,677 ballots cast by the borough's 4,974 registered voters, yielding a 53.8% turnout.

United States Senate election results for Caldwell1
Year	Republican		Democratic		Third party(ies)	
Year	No.	%	No.	%	No.	%
2024	1,967	46.84%	2,146	51.11%	86	2.05%
2018	1,343	47.14%	1,397	49.03%	109	3.83%
2012	1,583	46.97%	1,726	51.22%	61	1.81%
2006	1,291	49.94%	1,234	47.74%	60	2.32%

United States Senate election results for Caldwell2
Year	Republican		Democratic		Third party(ies)	
Year	No.	%	No.	%	No.	%
2020	1,837	41.67%	2,504	56.81%	67	1.52%
2014	1,030	47.53%	1,098	50.67%	39	1.80%
2013	777	47.76%	833	51.20%	17	1.04%
2008	1,698	50.72%	1,601	47.82%	49	1.46%

== Education ==
The Caldwell-West Caldwell Public Schools is a public school district that serves students in pre-kindergarten through twelfth grade from Caldwell and West Caldwell. The roots of the district date back to 1872, though formal consolidation of the districts was established in 1904. As of the 2020–21 school year, the district, comprised of seven schools, had an enrollment of 2,669 students and 226.4 classroom teachers (on an FTE basis), for a student–teacher ratio of 11.8:1. Schools in the district (with 2020–21 enrollment data from the National Center for Education Statistics) are Harrison School (West Caldwell; 23 students; grades K-PreK), Jefferson Elementary School (West Caldwell; 266; K-5), Lincoln Elementary School (Caldwell; 260; K-5), Washington Elementary School (West Caldwell; 374; K-5), Wilson Elementary School (West Caldwell; 252; K-5), Grover Cleveland Middle School (Caldwell; 626; 6-8), and James Caldwell High School (West Caldwell; 829; 9-12).

The Essex County Vocational Technical Schools offers magnet school and vocational programs to students in eighth through twelfth grades from Caldwell and all of Essex County.

Mount Saint Dominic Academy for grades 9–12 operates under the auspices of the Roman Catholic Archdiocese of Newark. Private schools in Caldwell include Trinity Academy for grades PreK–8 which was founded in 1991 and which was closed by the Newark Archdiocese in the wake of falling enrollment. In 2015, Trinity Academy was one of 15 schools in New Jersey, and one of six private schools, recognized as a National Blue Ribbon School in the exemplary high performing category by the United States Department of Education.

The borough is home to Caldwell University, a catholic liberal arts college with 2,200 students. The West Essex Campus of Essex County College is located in West Caldwell.

== Transportation ==
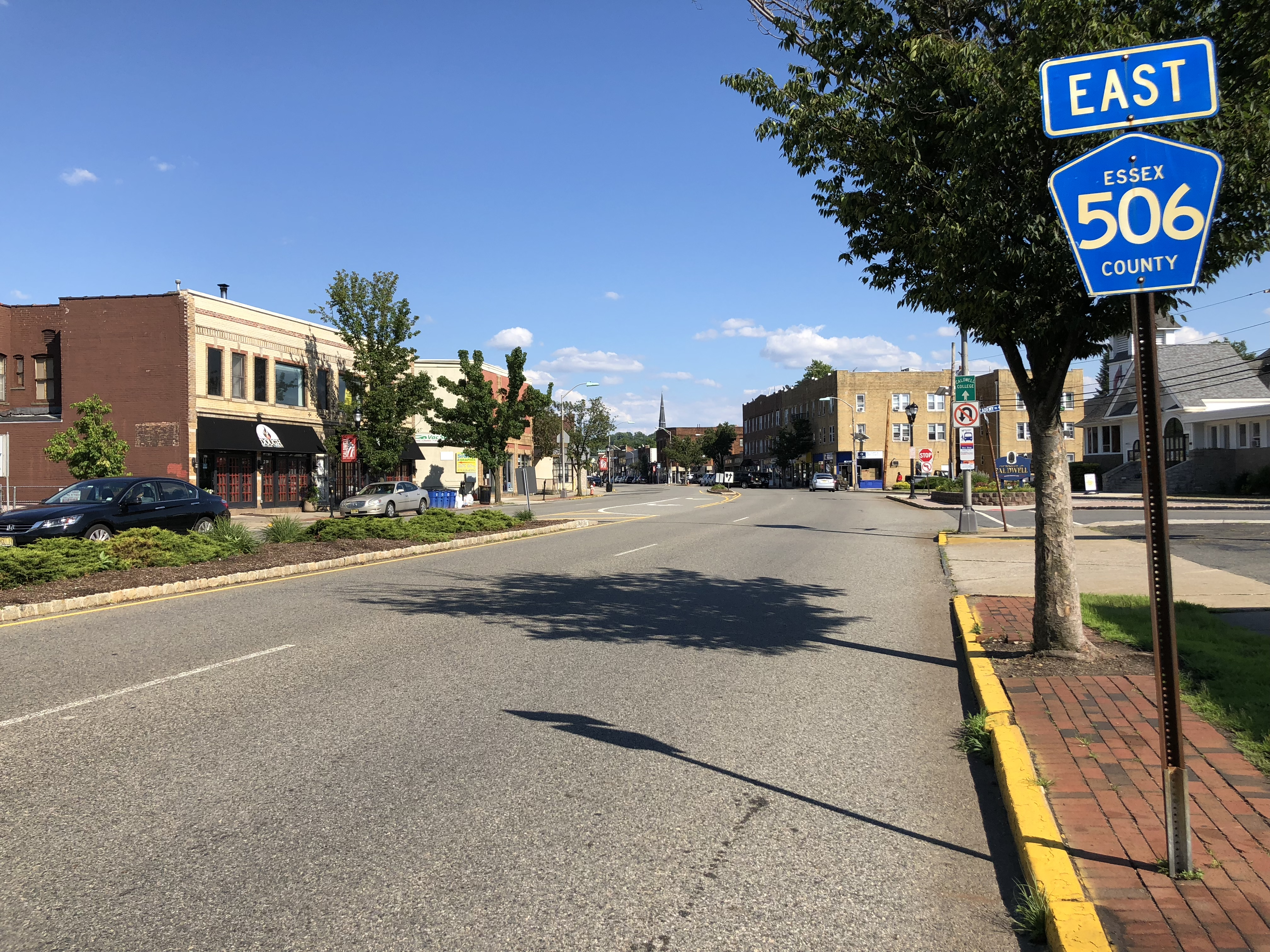
County Route 506 in Caldwell

=== Roads and highways ===
As of May 2010, the borough had a total of 18.41 miles (29.63 km) of roadways, of which 14.77 miles (23.77 km) were maintained by the municipality and 3.64 miles (5.86 km) by Essex County.

County Route 506 is the most significant roadway in Caldwell.

=== Public transportation ===
NJ Transit offers bus service to and from Caldwell on the 29 and 71 routes.

Commuter train service was offered historically at Caldwell station on the Caldwell Branch, which ran from Great Notch to Essex Fells, with service offered starting in 1891. The borough of Caldwell bought the station in 1965 from the Erie Lackawanna Railway and demolished it later that year. Service at Caldwell station ended in October 1966, when Erie Lackawanna discontinued several commuter lines, in the face of unsuccessful legal action in the courts to keep the service operating. In 1979, the tracks on the Caldwell Branch were torn up.

== Notable people ==
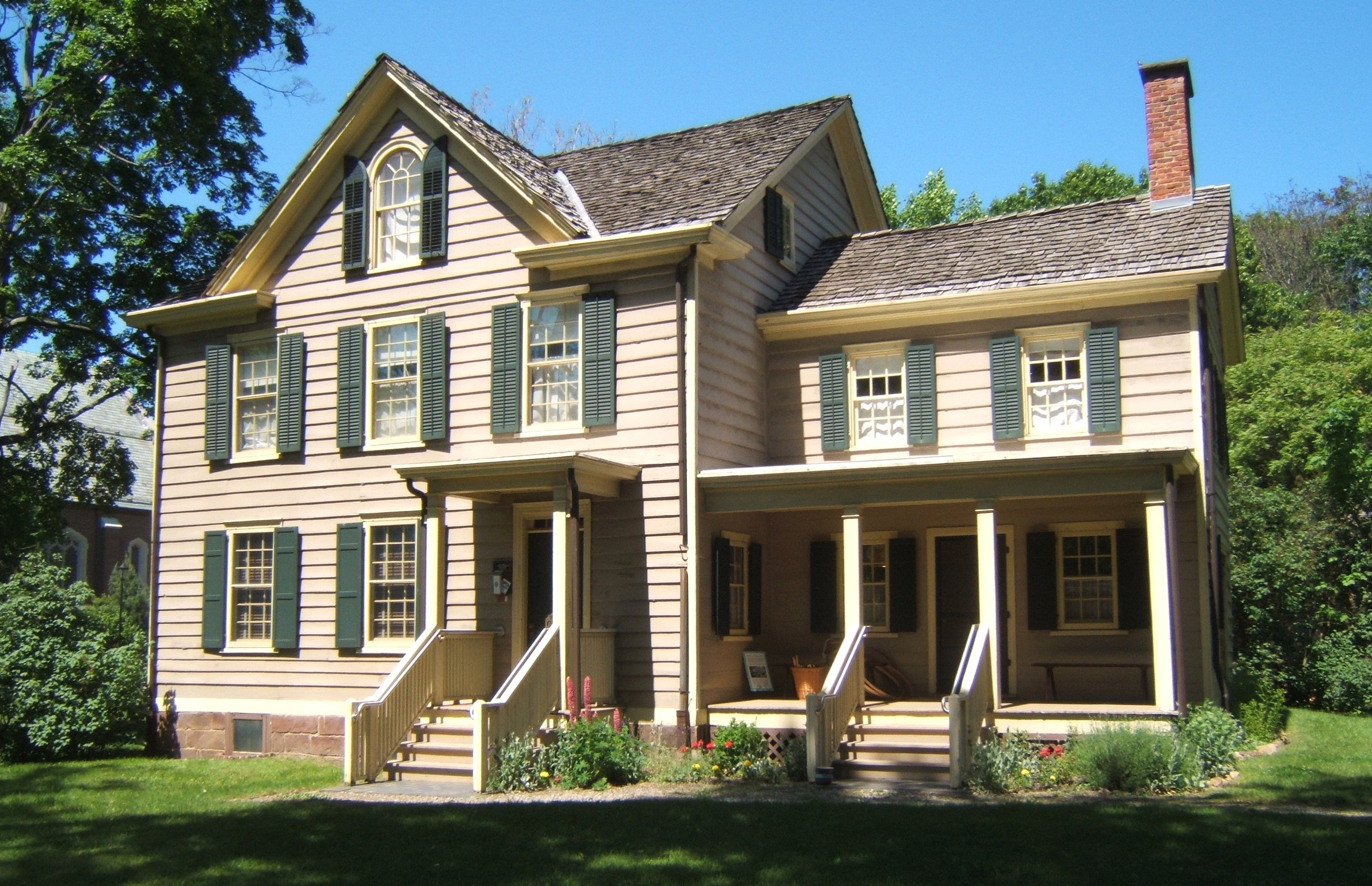
The birthplace of former U.S. president Grover Cleveland in Caldwell

People who were born in, residents of, or otherwise closely associated with Caldwell include:

- Madeline Cox Arleo (born 1963), United States district judge of the United States District Court for the District of New Jersey
- Alfred M. Best (1876–1958), actuary who founded AM Best Company, Inc. in 1899
- Whitey Campbell (1926–2015), head baseball coach at the University of Miami in 1958 and from 1960 to 1962
- Grover Cleveland (1837–1908), 22nd and 24th President of the United States
- Janine di Giovanni (born 1961), war correspondent
- Herbert O. Fisher (1909–1990), test pilot for Curtiss-Wright and executive at Port Authority of New York and New Jersey
- Frank Handlen (1916–2023), artist
- J. Henry Harrison (1878–1943), lawyer and politician who represented Essex County in the New Jersey Senate
- Gerald Henderson Jr. (born 1987), NBA basketball player for the Charlotte Bobcats
- Mary G. Hill (1803-1884), first of president the Woman's Christian Temperance Union of Newark
- Ka Kwong Hui (1922–2003), potter, ceramist and educator
- The Amazing Kreskin (1935–2024), mentalist
- James Lordi (1910–1985), politician who served in the New Jersey General Assembly from 1970 to 1972
- John B. MacChesney (1929–2021), scientist who was pioneer in optical communication at Bell Labs
- Camryn Manheim (born 1961), actress
- Kareem McKenzie (born 1979), offensive tackle for the NFL's New York Giants
- George DeGraw Moore (1822–1891), Wisconsin State Senator and New Jersey jurist, was born in Caldwell
- Elizaveta Pletneva (born 2002), rhythmic gymnast who represented the United States at the 2020 Summer Olympics
- Stuart Rabner (born 1960), Chief Justice of the New Jersey Supreme Court
- Steve Schindler (born 1954), guard who played in the NFL for the Denver Broncos
- Tom Spratley (1914–1987), film and television actor, known for playing "Curly Jackson" in the 1973 film The Sting
- Richard E. Stearns (born 1936), computer scientist
- Peter Stewart, former mayor of Caldwell who served as an Essex County Freeholder and in the New Jersey General Assembly
- Johnny Sylvester (1915–1990), childhood home of boy promised by Babe Ruth that he would hit a home run in the 1926 World Series
- Calvin Thomas (1885–1964), actor
- Claude Thornhill (1908–1965), pianist, arranger, composer and bandleader in the big band era
- Gus Troxler (c. 1871–1945), strong man, boxer, actor, sports promoter and physical-training expert
- Andy White (1930–2015), British session drummer who made three records with The Beatles, including Love Me Do
- Thea White (1940–2021), voice actress best known for her work as Muriel Bagge in the animated TV show Courage the Cowardly Dog
