= Whitey Campbell =

American football, basketball, baseball player and coach

Biographical details
- Born: January 19, 1926; New York City, U.S.
- Died: November 3, 2015 (aged 89); Rutherfordton, North Carolina, U.S.

Playing career

Football
- 1946–1949: Miami (FL)

Basketball
- 1946–1950: Miami (FL)

Baseball
- 1947–1950: Miami (FL)
- Position: Fullback (football)

Coaching career (HC unless noted)

Football
- 1950: Miami (FL) (assistant freshmen)
- 1951–1956: Miami Jackson HS (FL) (assistant)
- 1957–1961: Miami (FL) (assistant)
- 1965–1966: Montana (assistant)
- 1967–1968: Navy (assistant)
- 1969–1970: Kentucky (assistant)
- 1971–1975: Miami (FL) (assistant)
- 1976–1980: New Orleans Saints (ST)

Basketball
- 1951–1957: Miami Jackson HS (FL)

Baseball
- 1958: Miami (FL)
- 1960–1962: Miami (FL)
- 1966: Montana

Alexander Carr "Whitey" Campbell (January 19, 1926 – November 3, 2015) was an American football, basketball, baseball player and coach. He served as the head baseball coach at the University of Miami in 1958 and from 1960 to 1962 and at the University of Montana in 1966.

Born in New York City and raised in Caldwell, New Jersey, Campbell attended James Caldwell High School, where he graduated in 1944 and was inducted into the school's hall of fame in 1990.

Campbell died on November 3, 2015, in Rutherfordton, North Carolina, after suffering from Alzheimer's disease.
