= Elizabeth Parr-Johnston =

Canadian businesswoman

Elizabeth Parr-Johnston CM
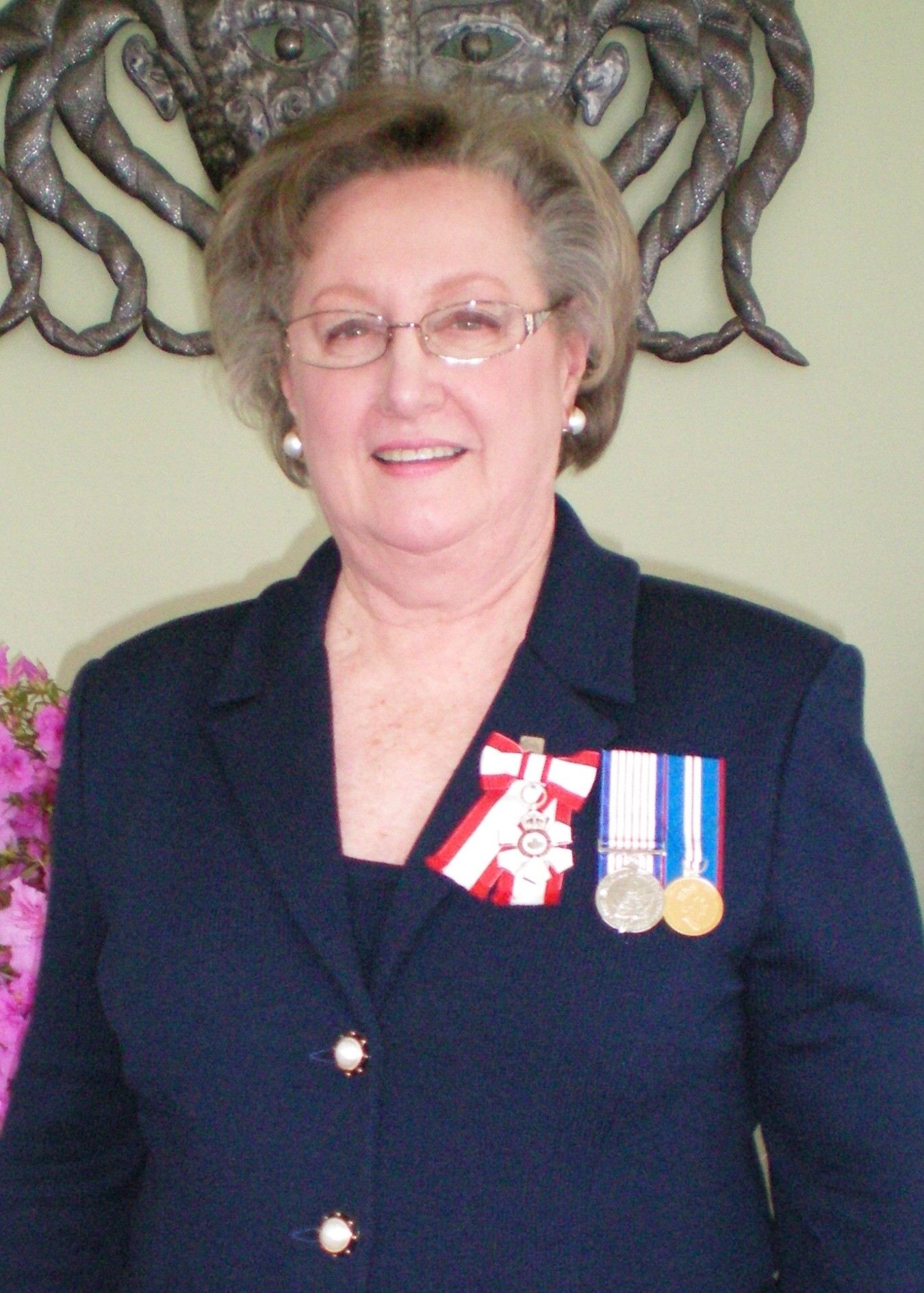
- Elizabeth Parr-Johnston

16th President of the University of New Brunswick
- In office 1996–2002
- Succeeded by: John D. Mclaughlin

Personal details
- Born: Elizabeth H. Parr; 1939 (age 86–87) New York, New York (United States)
- Spouse: Archibald F. Johnston 1982-2010
- Children: 2
- Education: B.A.-Wellesley College, 1961; M.A.-Yale University, 1963; PhD - Yale University, 1973
- Profession: Economic Policy Consultant
- Website: Biography

Elizabeth Parr-Johnston, CM (born Elizabeth H. Parr in 1939 in New York, NY) is a Canadian business woman. She is the Managing Partner of Parr-Johnston Consultants, an economic policy consultancy based in Chester Basin, Nova Scotia. Parr-Johnston is a past president of two Canadian Universities, a recipient of the 125th Anniversary of the Confederation of Canada Medal in 1992, the Queen Elizabeth II Golden Jubilee Medal in 2002 and the Order of Canada in 2008.

Raised in Essex Fells, New Jersey, she attended Grover Cleveland High School (since renamed as James Caldwell High School).

== Professional career ==
=== Academia and civil service ===
In 1962, after completing her master's degree in Economics from Yale University, Parr-Johnston moved to Canada. She taught economics at the University of Western Ontario, Huron College, the University of British Columbia and Carleton University. Parr-Johnston would relocate to the United States of America briefly in 1971 to teach at her father's alma mater, Wesleyan University before returning to Canada to join the federal civil service in various capacities over the next 5 years. In 1974, Parr-Johnston completed her doctoral work and earned her PhD in Economics from Yale University.

=== Private sector ===
Parr-Johnston accepted the position of Senior Policy Analyst and Director of Government Affairs at Inco in 1976 where she remained for 3 years. She returned to the private sector in 1980, joining Shell Canada where she held numerous senior positions over her 10-year tenure.

=== Employment & Immigration Canada ===
In 1979, Parr-Johnston won a political appointment as the Chief of Staff to Ron Atkey, the Canadian Minister of Employment and Immigration during the short-lived Conservative minority government. Among her many accomplishments at the Ministry, Parr-Johnston was involved in the secret extraction of six American Embassy workers who escaped to the safety of the Canadian Embassy in Tehran during the Iran hostage crisis.

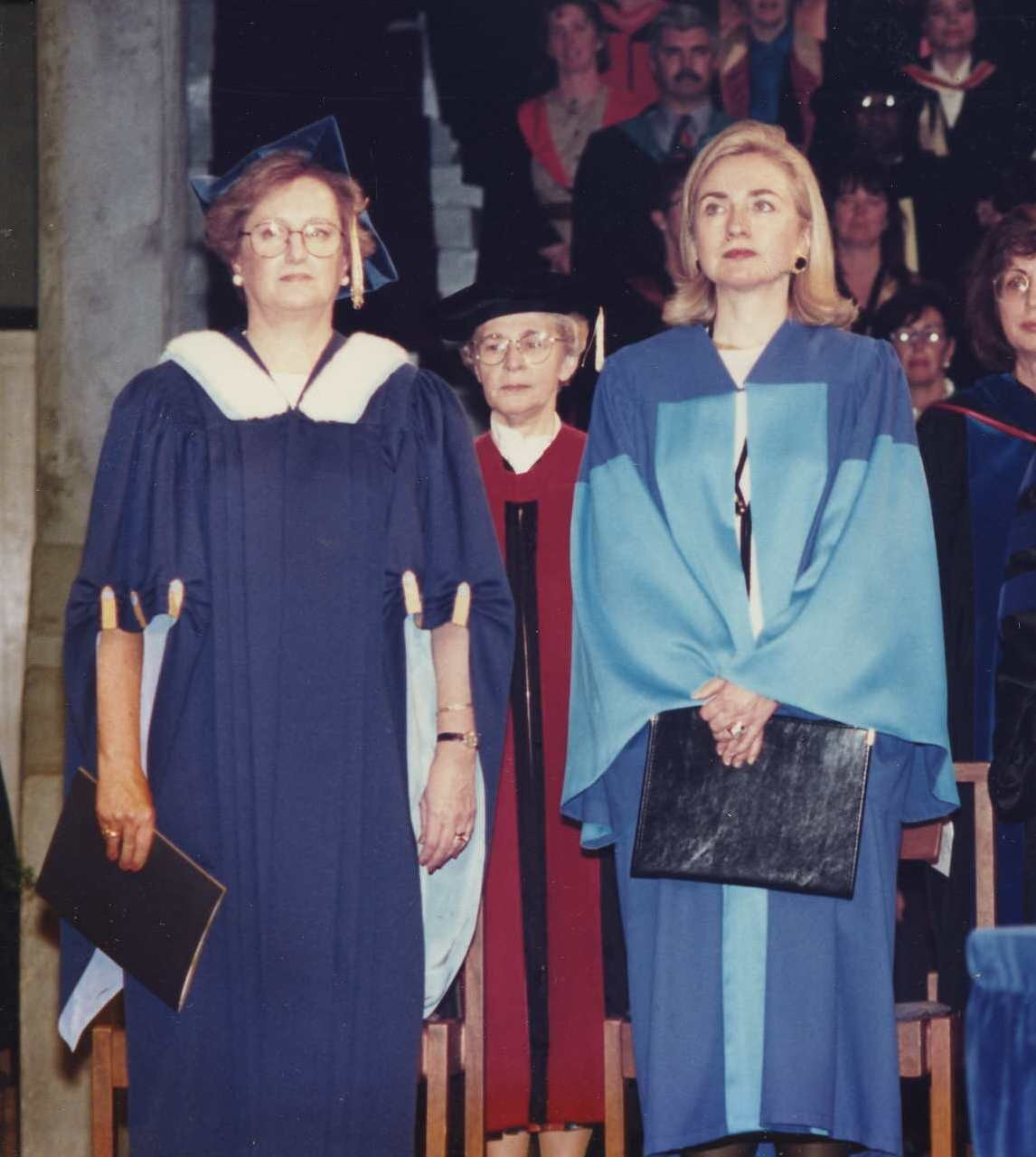
Parr-Johnston and Hillary Clinton

=== Mount Saint Vincent University ===
In 1991, Parr-Johnston was installed as the 8th President and Vice-Chancellor of Mount Saint Vincent University in Halifax, Nova Scotia. She served a full five-year term, leading Canada's only university dedicated primarily to the education of women. On June 16, 1995, coinciding with the 21st G7 summit taking place in Halifax, Parr-Johnston awarded an honorary Doctor of Letters to First Lady of the United States, Hillary Clinton, a fellow alumna of Wellesley College. The mount has established an endowed scholarship in the name of Parr-Johnston.

=== University of New Brunswick ===
Parr-Johnston was installed as the 16th President of the University of New Brunswick in Fredericton, New Brunswick in 1996. She completed one full six-year term in office before retiring to Nova Scotia with her husband Archie. In 2004, Parr-Johnston returned to UNB and was awarded an honorary Doctor of Letters for her contributions to the field of education. UNB named a student residence after Parr-Johnston.

=== Boards of directors and trustees ===
- Scotiabank
- Emera Incorporated
- Canadian Research Institute for Social Policy
- Millennium Scholarships
- W.L. Mackenzie King Memorial Scholarships
- FutureGenerations Canada
- Sustainable Development Technology Canada
- National Theater School
- Council of Canadian Academies
- Empire Company Limited
- Chester Golf Club
- FPI Limited

=== Equalization ===
On March 20, 2005, the Canadian Minister of Finance announced the appointment of Parr-Johnston to the Independent Panel for Equalization and Territorial Formula Financing. The purpose of the panel was to examine the existing system of federal transfer payments to the provinces and to recommend necessary changes to the process. The final report was delivered to the Minister in May 2006 and was adopted in its entirety by the Prime Minister of Canada.

=== Order of Canada ===
On February 22, 2008, Parr-Johnston was installed by the Governor General of Canada as a Member of the Order of Canada, Canada's highest civilian honour. Parr-Johnston was recognized for her lifetime contributions to the field of education. The Investiture Ceremony programme read as follows:

For decades, Elizabeth Parr-Johnston has made important contributions to the educational and voluntary sectors in Canada. As president of two universities in Atlantic Canada, she was highly respected for creating increased opportunities for women, notably by mentoring female faculty and by making education more accessible to women. Her expertise and wise counsel have been sought by public, private and community boards including those of the Canadian Millennium Scholarship Foundation, the Atlantic Institute for Market Studies and Symphony Nova Scotia. As head of her own consulting company, she continues to contribute to public policy development in Canada.

== Education ==
- Grover Cleveland High School – Valedictorian, 1957
- Wellesley College – B.A. Economics, 1961 (ΦΒΚ),(Woodrow Wilson Fellow)
- Yale University – M.A. Economics, 1962
- Yale University – PhD Economics, 1974
- Harvard Business School – Advanced Management Program
- University of New Brunswick – D.Litt. (Honorary), 2004

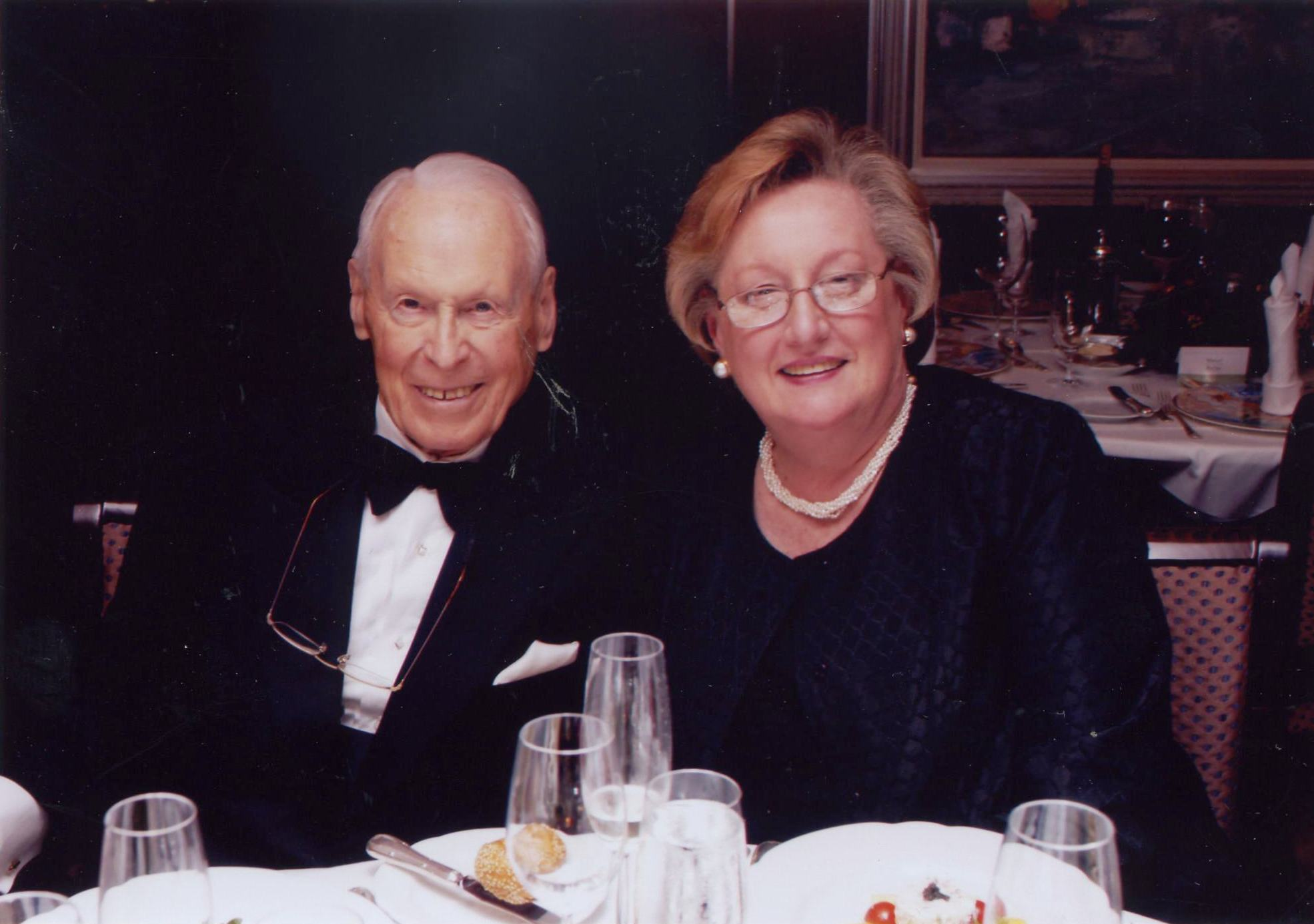
Liz & Archie Johnston

== Personal life ==
Parr-Johnston is the oldest child of F. Van S. Parr Jr. and Helene Parr. Her late father was the Senior Partner of Whitman & Ransom and former National President of the Chi Psi (ΧΨ) Fraternity. Her brother, Dr. Grant V.S. Parr, is the former Chief of Cardiothoracic surgery at Atlantic Health. Her sister, Sally Cerny was an instructor of psychology at Rutgers University.

On March 9, 1982, at the Royal Canadian Military Institute in Toronto, Ontario, Parr-Johnston married Archibald F. Johnston, former Vice President of General Electric. Between them, they have six children, all from prior marriages. Archie died on January 23, 2010. Currently, Parr-Johnston resides in Halifax, Nova Scotia.

Preceded by Naomi Hersom	President & Vice Chancellor of MSVU; 1991 – 1996	Succeeded by Sheila A. Brown

Preceded by Robin L. Armstrong	President & Vice Chancellor of UNB; 1996 – 2002	Succeeded by John D. Mclaughlin
