= Neale Godfrey =

American author (born 1951)

- Born: Neale Sheila Godfrey; March 4, 1951 (age 75); West Caldwell, New Jersey, U.S.
- Education: American University
- Occupations: Financial Author, Television Personality, American Financial Advisor, Personal Finance Columnist, founder of Children's Financial Network, Inc.
- Notable work: Money Doesn't Grow on Trees: A Parent's Guide to Raising Financially Responsible Children (book)
- Website: nealegodfrey.com

Neale Sheila Godfrey (born March 4, 1951) is an American author. Her books deal with money, life skills, and value issues. One of them, Money Doesn't Grow on Trees: A Parent's Guide to Raising Financially Responsible Children, was a New York Times #1 Best Seller. She is currently Executive in Residence at the Columbia Graduate School of Business and is a former contributor at Forbes.com.

== Early life and education ==
Neale grew up in West Caldwell, New Jersey and graduated from James Caldwell High School in 1969. She then obtained a B.S., cum laude, from The School of International Service at the American University.

== Career ==
Neale began her career with Chase Manhattan Bank in 1972, joining as one of the first female executives and later became president of The First Women's Bank and founder of The First Children's Bank in F.A.O. Schwarz. In 1989, Neale formed her own company, Children's Financial Network, Inc., with a mission to educate children and their parents about money.

Over the years, Neale has served as a national spokesperson for such companies as Aetna, Microsoft, Coca-Cola, Fidelity, Nuveen. She has also appeared as a financial expert on programs such as The Oprah Winfrey Show, Good Morning America, The Today Show, and CNN, as well as in the PBS special, Your Money, Your Children, Your Life. Neale is also a former nationally syndicated columnist for the Associated Press.

Neale has served on the White House and governor's Task Forces as well as on the board of directors of New York Board of Trade, UNICEF, University of Charleston, Morris County Chamber of Commerce, UN Women, and the Young Presidents’ Organization (YPO).

== Books and programs ==
Neale's most widely read books are "Money Doesn't Grow on Trees: A Parent's Guide to Raising Financially Responsible Children," that reached #1 on the New York Times Best Sellers list, and "Neale S. Godfrey's Ultimate Kids' Money Book." Other notable titles include Mom, Inc.: Taking Your Work Skills Home, A Penny Saved: Teaching Your Children the Values and Life Skills They Will Need to Live in the Real World, and Money Still Doesn't Grow on Trees: A Parent's Guide to Raising Financially Responsible Teenagers and Young Adults.

Through Neale's guidance, Children's Financial Network produced a national program starting in 2007 entitled LIFE, Inc: The Ultimate Career Guide for Young People. This program, which ran through 2012, served over one million middle school and high school students. The LIFE, Inc. video and program received the Mercury Communications Award. One of her books, ECO-Effect: The Greening of Money, combines economics and ecology to show adults and children how they can save money while saving the environment.

Neale was one of the first to develop money curricula for children and young adults, pre-K through high school, entitled The One and Only Common Sense/Cents Series as well as a CD ROM called MoneyTown. The curriculum was implemented in over 5,000 classrooms across 48 states. She has also released three iOS video gaming apps, two hitting #1 in the Educational Gaming Category: GreenStreets: Unleash The Loot! and GreenStreets: Shmootz Happens! Her latest app, GreenStreets: Heifer International, is a collaboration with Heifer International that teaches kids and parents how to connect the virtual and real worlds.

Currently, Neale serves on New Jersey's State Employment and Training Commission Council on Gender Parity in Labor and Education as well as New Jersey's Science and Technology Workforce Subcommittee. She serves on the board of advisors of DriveWealth, a mobile and global full carrying broker dealer for retail investors, providing a low-cost, easy-to-use investing platform to individuals worldwide. Neale is also a faculty member of the Entrepreneurship Bootcamp for Veterans with Disabilities (EBV), and VWise (Veteran Women Igniting the Spirit of Entrepreneurship), operated by the Institute For Veterans and Military Families at the Whitman School of Management of Syracuse University, which offers training to post-9/11 disabled veterans.

== Awards ==
In 2009, Neale was recognized as one of New Jersey's “50 Best Women in Business,” and that same year, she was National Winner of w2wlink's Ascendancy Awards for Business Women. Neale has also been honored with awards such as “Woman of the Year,” “Banker of the Year,” “Child Advocate of the Year,” and the Femme Award from the United Nations. In 2011, she was awarded Garden State Woman of the Year. She was the recipient of United Negro College Fund’s Outstanding Community Service Award in 2012 and received the 2013 Women of Influence Award from the Commerce and Industry Association of New Jersey. Also in 2013, Neale graduated from The National Security Seminar at the U.S. Army War College. More recently, Neale earned the Muriel Siebert Lifetime Achievement Award for her trailblazing work on financial literacy and achieved the National Honoree designation from WomenInBusiness.org.

== Selected bibliography ==
- Godfrey, Neale, Edwards, Carolina, Richards, Tad (1989). Money Doesn't Grow on Trees: A Parent's Guide to Raising Financially Responsible Children. Atria Books. ISBN 0743287800
- Godfrey, Neale, Richards, Tad (1995). Penny Saved: Teaching Your Children the Values and Life Skills They Will Need to Live in the Real World. Simon & Schuster. ISBN 0684824809
- Godfrey, Neale, Richards, Tad (1997). Making Change: A Woman's Guide to Designing Her Financial Future. Simon & Schuster. ISBN 068483202X
- Godfrey, Neale, Randy Verougstraete (1998). Neale S. Godfrey's Ultimate Kids' Money Book. Simon & Schuster Children's Publishing. ISBN 0689817177
- Godfrey, Neale S., Richards, Tad (2000). Mom, Inc.: Taking Your Work Skills Home. Fireside. ISBN 0684865505
- Godfrey, Neale, Richards, Tad (2004). Money Still Doesn't Grow on Trees: A Parent's Guide to Raising Financially Responsible Teenagers and Young Adults. Rodale Books. ISBN 9781579548513
- Godfrey, Neale S. (2009). Eco Effect - The Greening of Money. Children's Financial Network. ISBN 0615357237
