= Michael Tracey (commentator) =

American commentator (born 1988)

- Tracey in 2025
- Born: Michael Clifford Tracey; August 8, 1988 (age 38)
- Other name: M. Tracey
- Education: James Caldwell High School; The College of New Jersey
- Employer: Vice (2013-16) The Young Turks (2017–18)
- Political party: Democratic (Note: Tracey has stated that he has been a registered Democrat his entire life and supported Barack Obama and Bernie Sanders in presidential primaries and/or presidential elections.)
- Website: mtracey.net

Michael Clifford Tracey (born August 8, 1988) is an American political commentator and journalist. He has written for Vice and The Young Turks.

Tracey has received substantial media attention for his skepticism of accusations towards Jeffrey Epstein and his attempts to identify Jane Doe of the Cornell University rape allegations.

== Career ==
Tracey wrote for Vice between 2013-16 as a political correspondent. Between 2017–18 Tracey worked at The Young Turks. Tracey's reporting has been cited by publications including the Washington Post and The Wall Street Journal.

== Reporting and views ==
Tracey supported Bernie Sanders in the 2016 Democratic primaries, and then advocated for "conscious abstention" in the 2016 presidential election. Tracey has been critical of Bill and Hillary Clinton. In 2020, he supported Tulsi Gabbard's Democratic presidential campaign.

Tracey has been critical of the Democratic Party, and of allegations of collusion between Donald Trump and Russia. During the first Trump administration, Tracey was a skeptic of allegations that Trump had engaged the Russian government to interfere in the 2016 election. According to a 2019 Vanity Fair article, Tracey "tried to quell the mob countless times", before Robert Mueller later "found no evidence of criminal conspiracy between Donald Trump and Moscow".

In June 2017, Congresswoman Maxine Waters walked away from an interview with Tracey and pushed aside his hand and microphone. The incident was captured on video. Tracey said that Waters had "initiated unwarranted physical contact" and "shoved" him, but that it was "not a violent shove".

In 2019, Tracey criticized an article by Kevin Poulsen in The Daily Beast, which revealed the identity and criminal history of a man who had allegedly created a modified video of House Speaker Nancy Pelosi that made her appear drunk.

Tracey was a recurring guest who defended left wing views on the Fox News program Tucker Carlson Tonight.

In 2021, The Daily Dot reported that Tracey "has been referred to by some as a 'Left Heretic,' a term used for self-described liberals who oppose, among other things, what they deem to be 'identity politics'". In April 2022, Justin Ling wrote in Foreign Policy that Tracey had questioned the authenticity of photos relating to the Bucha massacre as potential "war propaganda". In response, Tracey described Ling's article as a "smear" that took his comments "completely out of context"; arguing that his full tweet was an expression of concern that journalists had begun repeating Ukrainian government claims as fact, before they had been independently verified.

In 2024, Tracey occasionally substituted as host for journalist and commentator Glenn Greenwald's web news show System Update.

Prior to the 2024 presidential election, Tracey published an article in his newsletter in which he wrote that he had not voted for a major party candidate since 2008, which was to remain unchanged for 2024. He also wrote that he does not find third parties credible.

=== Reporting on sex crimes ===
Tracey has argued that the media reporting relating to the Epstein files has been excessively "conspiratorial". In the Wall Street Journal, Barton Swaim cited Tracey's coverage of an FBI memo in the Epstein files, in which the bureau was unable to corroborate allegations that Jeffrey Epstein and Ghislaine Maxwell had involved other associates in their offending. In September 2025, Tracey was ejected from a news conference featuring survivors of Epstein's abuse after Tracey questioned the veracity of Epstein accuser Virginia Giuffre. At an afterparty following the 2026 White House Correspondents' Dinner, Tracey confronted journalist Julie K. Brown, a prominent chronicler of the allegations against Jeffrey Epstein, after Brown shared a post suggesting that Tracey was being paid to downplay Epstein's sexual abuse. Jim Acosta subsequently began arguing with Tracey, with the pair nearly entering a physical altercation before Tracey was ejected from the event by security. Tracey subsequently threatened Acosta on social media, calling him a "pussy", and publicly challenged him to a fight outside the hotel where Tracey was staying.

In September 2026, Tracey asked his social media followers for information in order to identify the Jane Doe at the center of the Cornell University rape case. In response, multiple women on social media used the phrase "I am Jane Doe" as a means of defending and protecting the alleged victim. On October 2, Tracey posted a supposed name of the accuser on social media, stating that his action was protected as free speech by the First Amendment of the U.S. Constitution. He then rapidly deleted the name, saying that he had made his point, and "this is not a retraction". The New Yorker reported that his post had likely aided bad actors in searching for Doe. After posting the name he alleged to be Jane Doe, Tracey was targeted by harassment, including rape threats. The harassment spread to include those unrelated to the case, including Tracey's father and a family living in Tracey's childhood home in New Jersey.

== Personal life ==
Raised in West Caldwell, New Jersey, he graduated from James Caldwell High School in 2006. He has resided in Jersey City, New Jersey.

In February 2009, Tracey was arrested while a student at The College of New Jersey after he attempted to approach Ann Coulter, who had spoken at the college's campus in Ewing. He was charged with disorderly conduct and pleaded guilty to "violating a nuisance ordinance".
