= Richard Zirk =

American weightlifter (1936–2014)

Personal information
- Born: 1936 Fairfield Township, Essex County, New Jersey, U.S.
- Died: April 26, 2014 (aged 77) Fairfield, New Jersey, U.S.

Sport
- Sport: Weightlifting
Medal record
Representing the United States
World Championships
Silver medal – second place	1961 Vienna	+90 kg

Richard F. Zirk (1936 – April 26, 2014) was an American heavyweight weightlifter who won a silver medal at the 1961 World Championships.

A resident of Fairfield Township, Essex County, New Jersey, Zirk graduated from Grover Cleveland High School (since renamed as James Caldwell High School) in 1954, which inducted him into its hall of fame in 1997. After retiring from competitions Zirk worked for the Verona Public Schools. He was married for 57 years to Lorraine Zirk (née Korlishin), and had three children: Richard Zirk, Deborah Ruggieri, and Karen Summers.
