= Essex Fells, New Jersey =

Borough in Essex County, New Jersey, US

- Borough
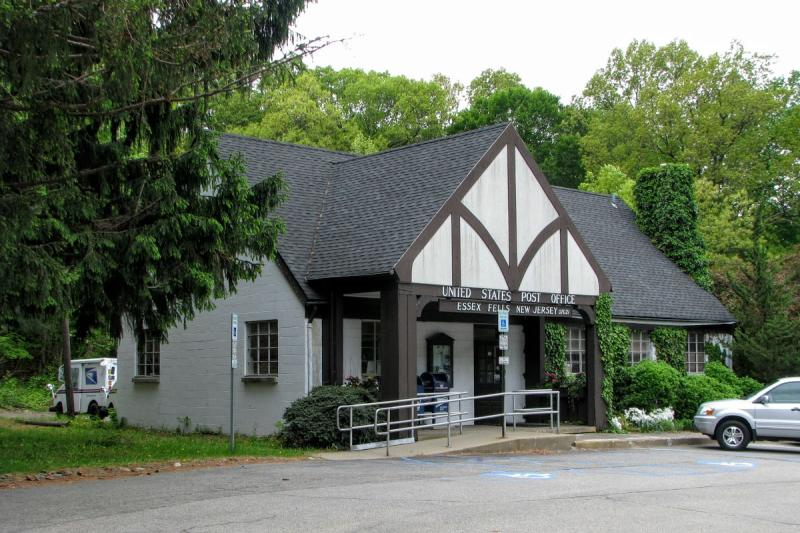
- Essex Fells Post Office

- logo

- Location of Essex Fells in Essex County highlighted in red (right). Inset map: Location of Essex County in New Jersey highlighted in orange (left).

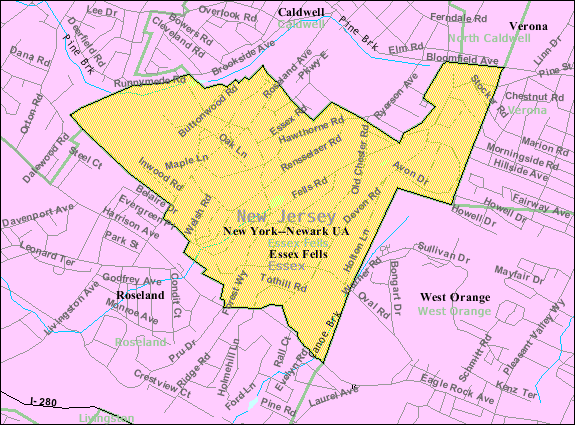
- Census Bureau map of Essex Fells, New Jersey

- Location in Essex County Location in New Jersey Location in the United States
- Coordinates: 40.828102°N 74.276226°W
- Country: United States
- State: New Jersey
- County: Essex
- Incorporated: March 31, 1902

Government
  - Type: Borough
  - Body: Borough Council
  - Mayor: Edward A. Davis (R, term ends December 31, 2029)
  - Administrator / Municipal clerk: Francine T. Paserchia

Area
  - Total: 1.41 sq mi (3.66 km^{2})
  - Land: 1.41 sq mi (3.65 km^{2})
  - Water: 0.0077 sq mi (0.02 km^{2}) 0.43%
  - Rank: 460th of 565 in state 20th of 22 in county
- Elevation: 505 ft (154 m)

Population (2020)
  - Total: 2,244
  - Estimate (2024): 2,220
  - Rank: 478th of 565 in state 22nd of 22 in county
  - Density: 1,593.4/sq mi (615.2/km^{2})
  - Rank: 329th of 565 in state 21st of 22 in county

Economics
  - Median income: $247,000 (± $27,417) (2020)
- Time zone: UTC−05:00 (Eastern (EST))
  - Summer (DST): UTC−04:00 (Eastern (EDT))
- ZIP Code: 07021
- Area code: 973 exchanges: 226, 228, 264, 403, 618
- FIPS code: 3401321840
- GNIS feature ID: 2390558
- Website: www.essexfellsboro.com

Essex Fells is a borough in Essex County, in the U.S. state of New Jersey. As of the 2020 United States census, the borough's population was 2,244, an increase of 131 (+6.2%) from the 2010 census count of 2,113, which in turn had reflected a decline of 49 (−2.3%) from the 2,162 counted in the 2000 census.

Essex Fells was incorporated as a borough by an act of the New Jersey Legislature on March 31, 1902, from portions of Caldwell Township (now Fairfield Township). The community's name was derived by taking "Essex" from the name of the county and adding "Fells" from the name of John F. Fell which also means hill or down.

New Jersey Family magazine ranked Essex Fells as the best town for families in its 2016 rankings of "New Jersey's Best Towns for Families". New Jersey Monthly magazine ranked Essex Fells as its 10th best place to live in its 2008 rankings of the "Best Places To Live" in New Jersey. Niche.com ranked Essex Fells as the seventh best place to live in its 2019 rankings of the "Best Places to Live" in New Jersey.

In 2010, Forbes.com listed Essex Fells as 182nd in its listing of "America's Most Expensive ZIP Codes", with a median home price of $1,140,885. The borough's median household income, as of the 2020 United States census, was $247,000.

== History ==
Essex Fells was part of the Horseneck Tract, which was an area that consisted of what are now the municipalities of Caldwell, West Caldwell, North Caldwell, Fairfield, Verona, Cedar Grove, Essex Fells, Roseland, and portions of Livingston and West Orange.

In 1702, settlers purchased the 14,000 acres (57 km^{2}) Horseneck Tract—so-called because of its irregular shape that suggested a horse's neck and head—from the Lenni Lenape Native Americans for goods equal to $325. This purchase encompassed much of western Essex County, from the Orange, or First Mountain in the Watchung Mountain range to the Passaic River.

In the late 1800s, Philadelphia developer Anthony S. Drexel realized the impact of train travel on residential development and sent Charles W. Leavitt to the northern New Jersey area near the end of the Caldwell line. Leavitt, Drexel and Drexel's son-in-law John F. Fell formed the Suburban Land Company and purchased 1,000 acres of land from the estate of Revolutionary War General William J. Gould. In order to create their residential development the group commissioned noted architect Ernest W. Bowditch. The community's name was derived by taking "Essex" from the name of the county and adding "Fells" from the name of John F. Fell which also means hill or down.

Based on an ordinance passed in 1928, commercial activity in the borough is limited to a single three-story building constructed to look like a house and two small workshops on a dead end. In 2000, Essex Fells had 750 houses, most of which were custom built, with many occupying lots several acres in size. The borough has no apartment buildings, office buildings or traffic lights, and until recently, no condominiums. The only units available for rental are in carriage houses and other ancillary structures.

In 1981, the borough was one of seven Essex County municipalities to pass a referendum to become a township, joining four municipalities that had already made the change, of what would ultimately be more than a dozen Essex County municipalities to reclassify themselves as townships in order take advantage of federal revenue sharing policies that allocated townships a greater share of government aid to municipalities on a per capita basis. Effective January 1, 1992, it again became a borough.

== Geography ==
According to the United States Census Bureau, the borough had a total area of 1.41 square miles (3.66 km^{2}), including 1.41 square miles (3.65 km^{2}) of land and 0.01 square miles (0.02 km^{2}) of water (0.43%).

The borough borders the Essex County municipalities of Caldwell, North Caldwell, Roseland, Verona, West Caldwell and West Orange.

=== Climate ===
Climate data for Essex Fells, New Jersey (1991–2020 normals, extremes 1903–present)
| Month | Jan | Feb | Mar | Apr | May | Jun | Jul | Aug | Sep | Oct | Nov | Dec | Year |
|---|---|---|---|---|---|---|---|---|---|---|---|---|---|
| Record high °F (°C) | 72 (22) | 75 (24) | 89 (32) | 98 (37) | 98 (37) | 100 (38) | 103 (39) | 105 (41) | 103 (39) | 90 (32) | 84 (29) | 74 (23) | 105 (41) |
| Mean daily maximum °F (°C) | 38.3 (3.5) | 41.0 (5.0) | 49.4 (9.7) | 62.8 (17.1) | 72.2 (22.3) | 80.5 (26.9) | 85.6 (29.8) | 84.2 (29.0) | 77.5 (25.3) | 65.0 (18.3) | 53.2 (11.8) | 43.3 (6.3) | 62.8 (17.1) |
| Daily mean °F (°C) | 29.9 (−1.2) | 31.7 (−0.2) | 39.6 (4.2) | 51.2 (10.7) | 60.6 (15.9) | 69.7 (20.9) | 74.9 (23.8) | 73.3 (22.9) | 65.9 (18.8) | 54.0 (12.2) | 43.7 (6.5) | 35.3 (1.8) | 52.5 (11.4) |
| Mean daily minimum °F (°C) | 21.4 (−5.9) | 22.5 (−5.3) | 29.8 (−1.2) | 39.6 (4.2) | 49.0 (9.4) | 58.8 (14.9) | 64.2 (17.9) | 62.5 (16.9) | 54.3 (12.4) | 42.9 (6.1) | 34.2 (1.2) | 27.3 (−2.6) | 42.2 (5.7) |
| Record low °F (°C) | −14 (−26) | −7 (−22) | −3 (−19) | 15 (−9) | 26 (−3) | 38 (3) | 45 (7) | 36 (2) | 30 (−1) | 21 (−6) | 11 (−12) | −7 (−22) | −14 (−26) |
| Average precipitation inches (mm) | 3.64 (92) | 2.93 (74) | 4.16 (106) | 4.08 (104) | 4.04 (103) | 4.60 (117) | 4.80 (122) | 4.47 (114) | 4.53 (115) | 4.31 (109) | 3.64 (92) | 3.41 (87) | 48.61 (1,235) |
Source: NOAA

== Demographics ==
Historical population
| Census | Pop. | Note | %± |
|---|---|---|---|
| 1910 | 442 | | — |
| 1920 | 598 | | 35.3% |
| 1930 | 1,115 | | 86.5% |
| 1940 | 1,466 | | 31.5% |
| 1950 | 1,617 | | 10.3% |
| 1960 | 2,174 | | 34.4% |
| 1970 | 2,541 | | 16.9% |
| 1980 | 2,363 | | −7.0% |
| 1990 | 2,139 | | −9.5% |
| 2000 | 2,162 | | 1.1% |
| 2010 | 2,113 | | −2.3% |
| 2020 | 2,244 | | 6.2% |
| 2024 (est.) | 2,220 | ▼ | −1.1% |
Population sources: 1910–1920 1910–1930; 1940–2000 2000; 2010 2020

=== 2020 census ===
As of the 2020 census, Essex Fells had a population of 2,244. The median age was 44.1 years. 25.3% of residents were under the age of 18 and 17.7% of residents were 65 years of age or older. For every 100 females there were 93.8 males, and for every 100 females age 18 and over there were 93.9 males age 18 and over.

100.0% of residents lived in urban areas, while 0.0% lived in rural areas.

There were 750 households in Essex Fells, of which 42.1% had children under the age of 18 living in them. Of all households, 71.3% were married-couple households, 9.3% were households with a male householder and no spouse or partner present, and 16.0% were households with a female householder and no spouse or partner present. About 13.6% of all households were made up of individuals and 8.8% had someone living alone who was 65 years of age or older.

There were 806 housing units, of which 6.9% were vacant. The homeowner vacancy rate was 1.5% and the rental vacancy rate was 13.2%.

Racial composition as of the 2020 census
| Race | Number | Percent |
|---|---|---|
| White | 1,906 | 84.9% |
| Black or African American | 31 | 1.4% |
| American Indian and Alaska Native | 4 | 0.2% |
| Asian | 106 | 4.7% |
| Native Hawaiian and Other Pacific Islander | 0 | 0.0% |
| Some other race | 12 | 0.5% |
| Two or more races | 185 | 8.2% |
| Hispanic or Latino (of any race) | 137 | 6.1% |

=== 2010 census ===
The 2010 United States census counted 2,113 people, 728 households, and 598 families in the borough. The population density was 1,496.3 per square mile (577.7/km^{2}). There were 758 housing units at an average density of 536.8 per square mile (207.3/km^{2}). The racial makeup was 94.56% (1,998) White, 1.09% (23) Black or African American, 0.00% (0) Native American, 2.18% (46) Asian, 0.00% (0) Pacific Islander, 0.24% (5) from other races, and 1.94% (41) from two or more races. Hispanic or Latino of any race were 1.99% (42) of the population.

Of the 728 households, 42.6% had children under the age of 18; 73.4% were married couples living together; 6.2% had a female householder with no husband present and 17.9% were non-families. Of all households, 16.3% were made up of individuals and 9.9% had someone living alone who was 65 years of age or older. The average household size was 2.90 and the average family size was 3.26.

29.9% of the population were under the age of 18, 4.3% from 18 to 24, 18.0% from 25 to 44, 31.6% from 45 to 64, and 16.1% who were 65 years of age or older. The median age was 43.8 years. For every 100 females, the population had 94.6 males. For every 100 females ages 18 and older there were 95.6 males.

The Census Bureau's 2006–2010 American Community Survey showed that (in 2010 inflation-adjusted dollars) median household income was $182,031 (with a margin of error of +/− $16,894) and the median family income was $202,917 (+/− $46,038). Males had a median income of $120,417 (+/− $32,492) versus $72,500 (+/− $12,065) for females. The per capita income for the borough was $94,423 (+/− $11,353). About 0.9% of families and 0.9% of the population were below the poverty line, including 0.9% of those under age 18 and none of those age 65 or over.

=== 2000 census ===
As of the 2000 United States census there were 2,162 people, 737 households, and 605 families residing in the borough. The population density was 1,534.0 inhabitants per square mile (592.3/km^{2}). There were 761 housing units at an average density of 540.0 per square mile (208.5/km^{2}). The racial makeup of the borough was 96.95% White, 0.46% African American, 0.19% Native American, 1.02% Asian, 0.14% from other races, and 1.25% from two or more races. Hispanic or Latino of any race were 1.20% of the population.

There were 737 households, out of which 40.0% had children under the age of 18 living with them, 75.3% were married couples living together, 5.3% had a female householder with no husband present, and 17.9% were non-families. 15.1% of all households were made up of individuals, and 8.4% had someone living alone who was 65 years of age or older. The average household size was 2.93 and the average family size was 3.28.

In the borough the population was spread out, with 29.7% under the age of 18, 3.6% from 18 to 24, 24.5% from 25 to 44, 27.5% from 45 to 64, and 14.7% who were 65 years of age or older. The median age was 40 years. For every 100 females, there were 96.9 males. For every 100 females age 18 and over, there were 94.6 males.

The median income for a household in the borough was $148,173, and the median income for a family was $175,000. Males had a median income of $100,000 versus $52,266 for females. The per capita income for the borough was $77,434. About 0.3% of families and 1.1% of the population were below the poverty line, including 0.9% of those under age 18 and 0.6% of those age 65 or over.

== Parks and recreation ==
Grover Cleveland Park, the seventh-largest park in the Essex County park system, is a heavily wooded park covering 41.48 acres (167,900 m^{2}) in the western section of the county along the Caldwell-Essex Fells border.

Essex Fells Pond, or also known as "The Pond" by Essex Fells residents, is a popular destination in the winter. Located on Fells Road, "The Pond" attracts people of all ages, typically during the months of December through March. Popular activities include ice skating, pond hockey, and figure skating.

== Government ==
=== Local government ===
Essex Fells is governed under the borough form of New Jersey municipal government, which is used in 218 municipalities (of the 564) statewide, making it the most common form of government in New Jersey. The governing body is comprised of the mayor and the borough council, with all positions elected at-large on a partisan basis as part of the November general election. The mayor is elected directly by the voters to a four-year term of office. The borough council includes six members elected to serve three-year terms on a staggered basis, with two seats coming up for election each year in a three-year cycle. The borough form of government used by Essex Fells is a "weak mayor / strong council" government in which council members act as the legislative body with the mayor presiding at meetings and voting only in the event of a tie. The mayor can veto ordinances subject to an override by a two-thirds majority vote of the council. The mayor makes committee and liaison assignments for council members, and most appointments are made by the mayor with the advice and consent of the council.

As of 2026, the mayor of Essex Fells is Republican Edward A. Davis, whose term of office ends December 31, 2029. Members of the Essex Fells Borough Council are Michael W. Cecere (R, 2027), Bernard J. D'Avella III (R, 2026), Carolyn Goldman (R, 2028), John A. King (R, 2026), Margaret D. O'Connor (R, 2028) and William B. Sullivan (R, 2027).

=== Federal, state, and county representation ===
Essex Fells is located in the 10th Congressional District and is part of New Jersey's 40th state legislative district. For the 119th United States Congress, New Jersey's 10th congressional district is represented by LaMonica McIver (D, Newark). New Jersey is represented in the United States Senate by Democrats Cory Booker (Newark, term ends 2027) and Andy Kim (Moorestown, term ends 2031).

For the 2026–2027 session, the 40th legislative district of the New Jersey Legislature is represented in the State Senate by Kristin Corrado (R, Totowa) and in the General Assembly by Al Barlas (R, Cedar Grove) and Christopher DePhillips (R, Wyckoff).

Essex County is governed by a directly elected county executive, with legislative functions performed by the Board of County Commissioners. As of 2025, the County Executive is Joseph N. DiVincenzo Jr. (D, Roseland), whose four-year term of office ends December 31, 2026. The county's Board of County Commissioners is composed of nine members, five of whom are elected from districts and four of whom are elected on an at-large basis. They are elected for three-year concurrent terms and may be re-elected to successive terms at the annual election in November. Essex County's Commissioners are:

Robert Mercado (D, District 1 – Newark's North and East Wards, parts of Central and West Wards; Newark, 2026), A'Dorian Murray-Thomas (D, District 2 – Irvington, Maplewood and parts of Newark's South and West Wards; Newark, 2026), Vice President Tyshammie L. Cooper (D, District 3 - Newark: West and Central Wards; East Orange, Orange and South Orange; East Orange, 2026), Leonard M. Luciano (D, District 4 – Caldwell, Cedar Grove, Essex Fells, Fairfield, Livingston, Millburn, North Caldwell, Roseland, Verona, West Caldwell and West Orange; West Caldwell, 2026), President Carlos M. Pomares (D, District 5 – Belleville, Bloomfield, Glen Ridge, Montclair and Nutley; Bloomfield, 2026), Brendan W. Gill (D, at large; Montclair, 2026), Romaine Graham (D, at large; Irvington, 2026), Wayne Richardson (D, at large; Newark, 2026), Patricia Sebold (D, at-large; Livingston, 2026).

Constitutional officers elected countywide are: Clerk Christopher J. Durkin (D, West Caldwell, 2025), Register of Deeds Juan M. Rivera Jr. (D, Newark, 2029), Sheriff Amir Jones (D, Newark, 2027), and Surrogate Alturrick Kenney (D, Newark, 2028).

=== Politics ===
As of March 2011, there were a total of 1,696 registered voters in Essex Fells, of which 347 (20.5%) were registered as Democrats, 847 (49.9%) were registered as Republicans and 499 (29.4%) were registered as Unaffiliated. There were 3 voters registered as Libertarians or Greens. On a local level, Essex Fells has elected a Republican mayor in every vote held since becoming a borough in 1902.

United States presidential election results for Essex Fells
| Year | Republican | | Democratic | | Third party(ies) | |
| Year | No. | % | No. | % | No. | % |
|---|---|---|---|---|---|---|
| 2024 | 759 | 52.89% | 651 | 45.37% | 25 | 1.74% |
| 2020 | 796 | 51.96% | 695 | 45.37% | 41 | 2.68% |
| 2016 | 716 | 55.46% | 507 | 39.27% | 68 | 5.27% |
| 2012 | 829 | 70.02% | 347 | 29.31% | 8 | 0.68% |
| 2008 | 829 | 64.92% | 437 | 34.22% | 11 | 0.86% |
| 2004 | 900 | 68.86% | 392 | 29.99% | 15 | 1.15% |

Gubernatorial election results for Essex Fells
| Year | Republican | | Democratic | | Third party(ies) | |
| Year | No. | % | No. | % | No. | % |
|---|---|---|---|---|---|---|
| 2025 | 666 | 55.55% | 528 | 44.04% | 5 | 0.42% |
| 2021 | 660 | 62.26% | 394 | 37.17% | 6 | 0.57% |
| 2017 | 394 | 57.69% | 275 | 40.26% | 14 | 2.05% |
| 2013 | 590 | 81.27% | 135 | 18.60% | 1 | 0.14% |
| 2009 | 688 | 69.08% | 224 | 22.49% | 84 | 8.43% |
| 2005 | 624 | 71.56% | 242 | 27.75% | 6 | 0.69% |

In the 2013 gubernatorial election, Republican Chris Christie received 81.3% of the vote (590 cast), ahead of Democrat Barbara Buono with 18.6% (135 votes), and other candidates with 0.1% (1 vote), among the 736 ballots cast by the borough's 1,789 registered voters (10 ballots were spoiled), for a turnout of 41.1%. In the 2009 gubernatorial election, Republican Chris Christie received 68.5% of the vote (688 ballots cast), ahead of Democrat Jon Corzine with 22.3% (224 votes), Independent Chris Daggett with 7.9% (79 votes) and other candidates with 0.5% (5 votes), among the 1,005 ballots cast by the borough's 1,682 registered voters, yielding a 59.8% turnout.

United States Senate election results for Essex Fells1
| Year | Republican | | Democratic | | Third party(ies) | |
| Year | No. | % | No. | % | No. | % |
|---|---|---|---|---|---|---|
| 2024 | 794 | 56.39% | 599 | 42.54% | 15 | 1.07% |
| 2018 | 609 | 63.57% | 329 | 34.34% | 20 | 2.09% |
| 2012 | 747 | 68.85% | 322 | 29.68% | 16 | 1.47% |
| 2006 | 609 | 67.74% | 277 | 30.81% | 13 | 1.45% |

United States Senate election results for Essex Fells2
| Year | Republican | | Democratic | | Third party(ies) | |
| Year | No. | % | No. | % | No. | % |
|---|---|---|---|---|---|---|
| 2020 | 818 | 54.75% | 651 | 43.57% | 25 | 1.67% |
| 2014 | 386 | 63.59% | 218 | 35.91% | 3 | 0.49% |
| 2013 | 308 | 62.35% | 184 | 37.25% | 2 | 0.40% |
| 2008 | 801 | 68.17% | 361 | 30.72% | 13 | 1.11% |

== Education ==
The Essex Fells School District serves public school students in pre-kindergarten through sixth grade at Essex Fells School. As of the 2024–25 school year, the district, comprised of one school, had an enrollment of 254 students and 26.5 classroom teachers (on an FTE basis), for a student–teacher ratio of 9.6:1.

Students in public school for seventh through twelfth grades attend the West Essex Regional School District, a regional school district serving students from Essex Fells, Fairfield, North Caldwell and Roseland. Schools in the district (with 2024–25 enrollment data from the National Center for Education Statistics) are West Essex Middle School with 5581,061 students in grades 7–8 and West Essex High School with 1,123 students in grades 9–12. Seats on the nine-member board of education of the high school district are allocated based on population, with one seat assigned to Essex Fells.

== Transportation ==
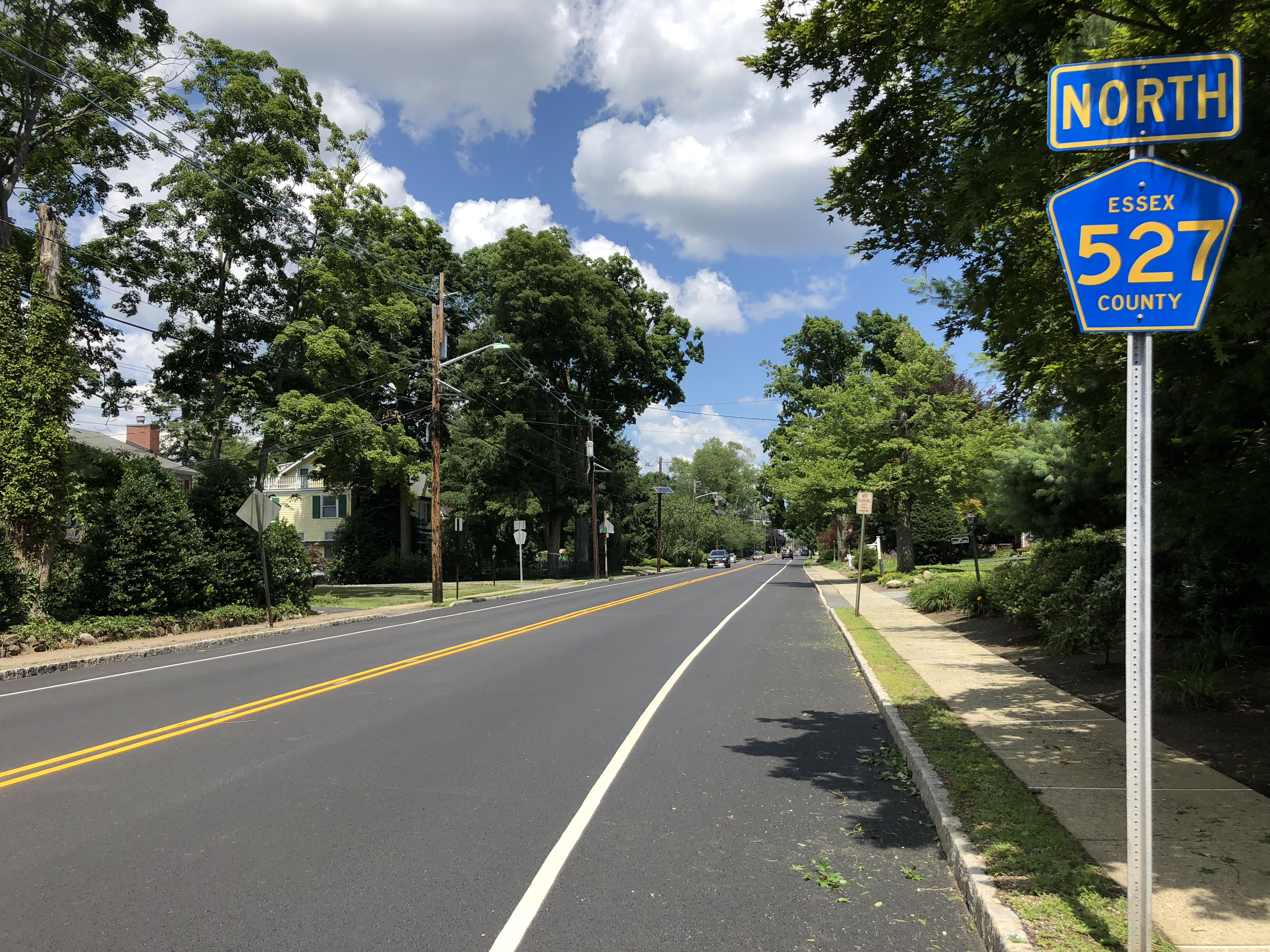
County Route 527 in Essex Fells

=== Roads and highways ===
As of May 2010, the borough had a total of 16.99 miles (27.34 km) of roadways, of which 15.31 miles (24.64 km) were maintained by the municipality and 1.68 miles (2.70 km) by Essex County.

County Route 527 and County Route 506 are the main roads serving Essex Fells.

=== Public transportation ===
NJ Transit provides service in the borough to and from Newark on the 29 and 71 routes.

== Notable people ==
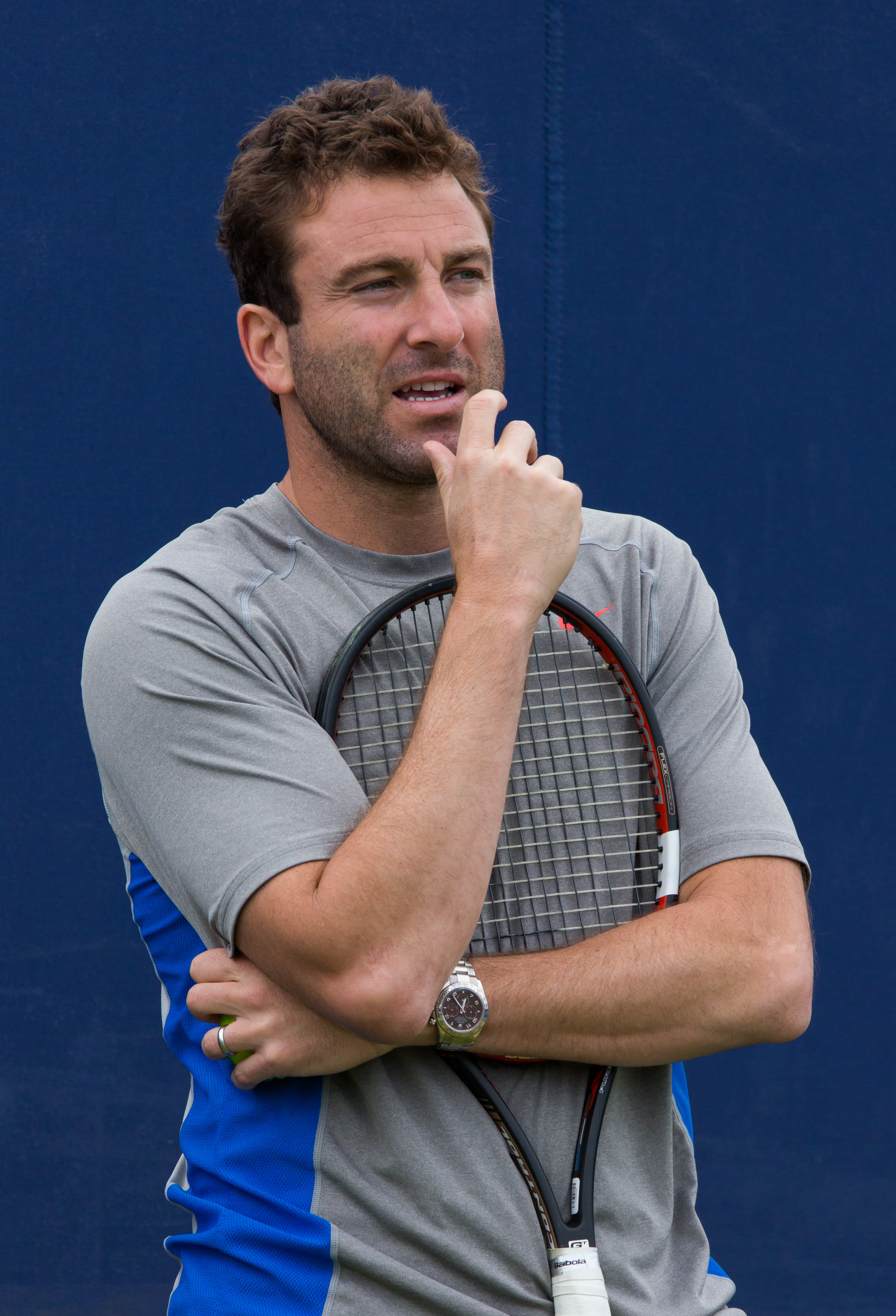
Justin Gimelstob

People who were born in, residents of, or otherwise closely associated with Essex Fells include:

- Bob Bradley (born 1958), former coach of the United States men's national soccer team
- Jeremy Brodeur (born 1996), professional ice hockey goalie
- Willis Carrier (1876–1950), known as the "father of the modern day air conditioner"
- Fillmore Condit (1855–1939), inventor, temperance activist and local politician* Fillmore Condit (1855–1939), inventor, temperance activist and local politician
- Doug Cook (born 1948), former professional basketball player
- Don Criqui (born 1940), sportscaster for CBS Sports
- Ian Eagle (born 1969), sports announcer
- Noah Eagle (born 1997), sportscaster for NBC Sports, Fox Sports and the Tennis Channel
- Connie Francis (1937–2025), singer
- Justin Gimelstob (born 1977), retired professional tennis player
- Anne Steele Marsh (1901–1995), painter and printmaker whose watercolors, oil paintings and wood engravings were widely exhibited
- James Randall Marsh (1896–1965), artist
- Henry G. Morse (1884–1934), architect
- Elizabeth Parr-Johnston (born 1939), Canadian business woman
- Brian Rafalski (born 1973), former NHL defenseman who played for the New Jersey Devils
- Scott Stevens (born 1964), former NHL defenseman who played for the New Jersey Devils during his career
- Bo Sullivan (1937–2000), chairman of the New Jersey Turnpike Authority and a Republican Party politician who sought the nomination for Governor of New Jersey in the 1981 primary
- Johnny Sylvester (1915–1990), lived here when he was visited on October 11, 1926, by Babe Ruth, who promised that he would hit a home run on his behalf during the 1926 World Series
- John C. Whitehead (1922–2015), former chairman of Goldman Sachs who also served as the 9th United States Deputy Secretary of State
