= Hatfield Swamp =

Swamp in New Jersey, United States

Coordinates: 40.8408°N 74.3283°W

Hatfield Swamp is a fresh water wetland area in the U.S. state of New Jersey, forming what might be considered the "second bank" of the Passaic River between Morris and Essex counties.

== Geology ==
During the late Triassic and early Jurassic periods, when the North American plate separated from the African plate, an aborted rift system was created. The resulting rift valley, known as the Newark Basin, was filled with alternating layers of red bed sediment and flood basalts. Over millions of years, the rift valley was faulted, tilted, and eroded, until the edges of the hard flood basalt layers formed ridges. Prior to 20,000 years before the present, an ancestral Passaic River flowed through a gap in these ridges. This changed when the Wisconsin Glacier, a massive continental ice sheet which formed during the last ice age, advanced on the region and permanently plugged the gap with glacial rubble. As the glacier eventually melted back, water pooled behind the ridges (known today as the Watchung Mountains), forming Glacial Lake Passaic. After thousands of years, the lake drained leaving behind many swamps with various hardwood trees struggling to take hold, including the Hatfield Swamp.

== Geography ==
The Whippany River flows into the Rockaway River, at the western end of the swamp. The Rockaway River travels a short distance and then flows into the Passaic River near the center of the swamp. The USGS gaging station is 1.3 miles (2.1 km) downstream of the Rockaway River confluence. At this point the Passaic River drainage is three hundred forty nine square miles. This includes the Rockaway River drainage of one hundred twenty five square miles and the Whippany River drainage of sixty nine square miles.

The area is from 180 feet (55 m) above sea level to 160 feet (49 m). Latitude 40.85 N and Longitude 74.32 W

The area of Hatfield Swamp is approximately 2,500 acres (10 km^{2}), located in northern New Jersey.

== History ==
The swamp is named for Cornelius Hetfield who owned and operated a mill sometime before the American Revolution. During the struggle, the properties of Hetfield, an acknowledged Loyalist, were confiscated and sold to Cyrus Crane, who operated a mill on the edge of the swamp in what is now West Caldwell. After the death of family member Herbert Crane in the 1960s, the mill was dismantled and moved to Allaire State Park in Monmouth County, New Jersey.

== Flora and fauna ==
The Hatfield Swamp floods several times a year, from heavy rain, snow melt in spring, or the remnants of storms that originated in the tropics. The area is the joining point of three rivers. The frequent flooding makes the swamp a difficult place to live for mammals, such as deer, raccoons, possums, skunks and fox. Most of these animals live on the fringes of the swamp, where the ground is higher.

Muskrats are low in population in the swamp due to several factors. The first is the flooding of the area, which fills bank dens with water. The second is the lack of plant foods that the muskrats eat. The third is water pollution. While efforts to clean the rivers of pollution have proven successful so far, pollutants remain in the soil and water.

Waterfowl that pass through the area in the autumn stop and rest in the swamp before proceeding south.

Fish that inhabit the Rockaway River and Whippany River are carp and catfish.

The area has a northern deciduous forest consisting of various oaks, maples, sweet gum, and elm. Most trees are from six to ten inches (254 mm), with some going to twenty inches. Due to the constant flooding makes it difficult for hardwood trees to grow.

== Hiking ==
The wetlands, which help facilitate hiking through their flatness, are a part of West Essex Park, and there are a number of trails open for public hiking. Both the Essex County Chapter of the Sierra Club and the New Jersey Audubon Society lead trips within the swamp throughout the year, while the Essex County Environmental Center provides information regarding such trips.
