= Henry Davidson =

Henry Davidson may refer to:

- Henry Brevard Davidson (1831–1899), officer in the United States Army
- Henry Alexander Davidson (1905–1973), American physician
- Henry Damon Davidson (1869–1955), school administrator and church leader in Centreville, Alabama
- Henry Davidson (RAF officer) (1915–1942), British flying ace with the Royal Air Force during the Second World War

== See also ==
- Henry Sheldon (educator) (Henry Davidson Sheldon, 1874–1948), American educator and historian
- Henry Davison (disambiguation)
