= Essex County Park System =

Parks of Essex County, New Jersey

Coordinates: 40.753323°N 74.177982°W

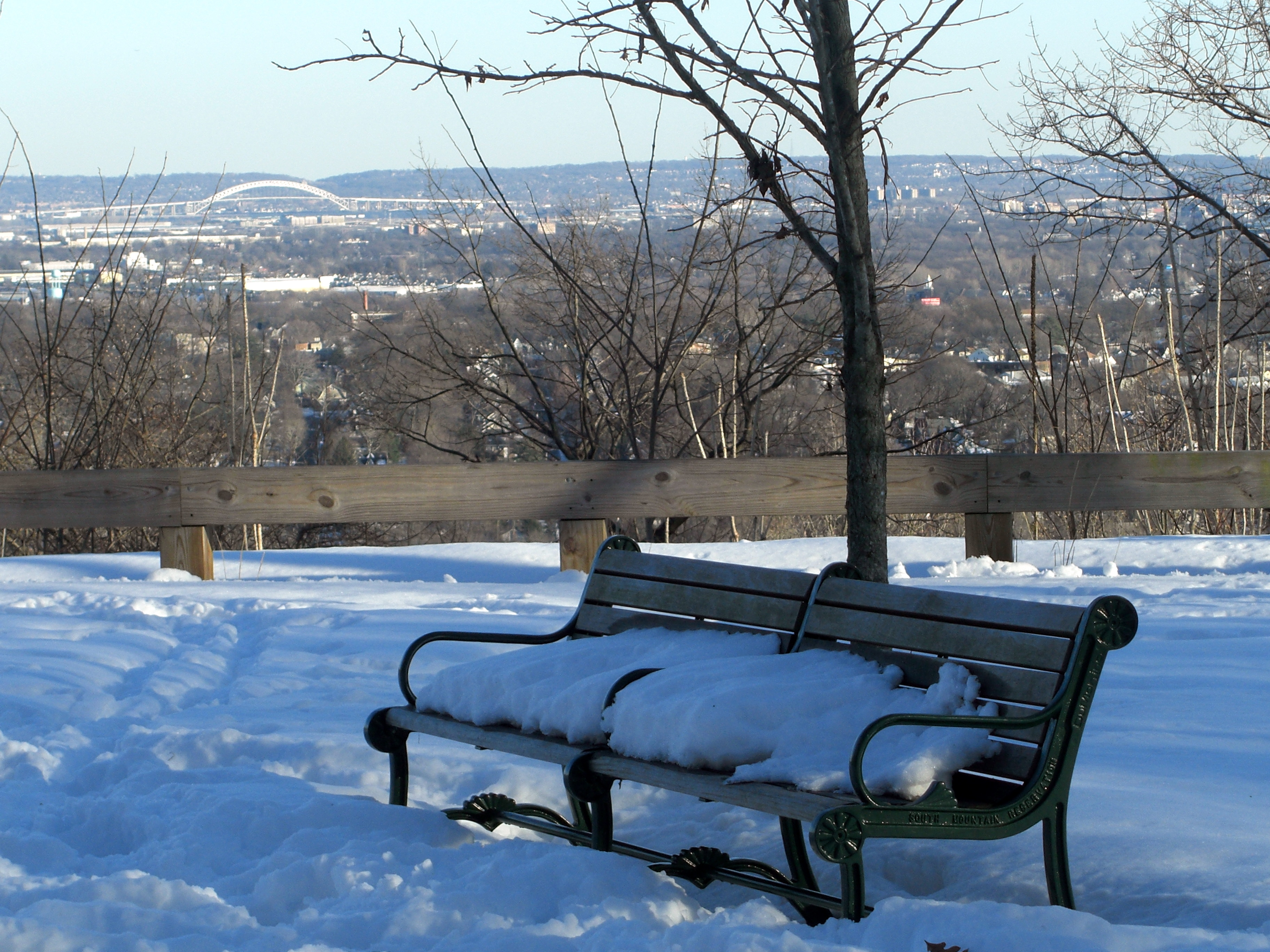
South Mountain Reservation of the Essex County Park System

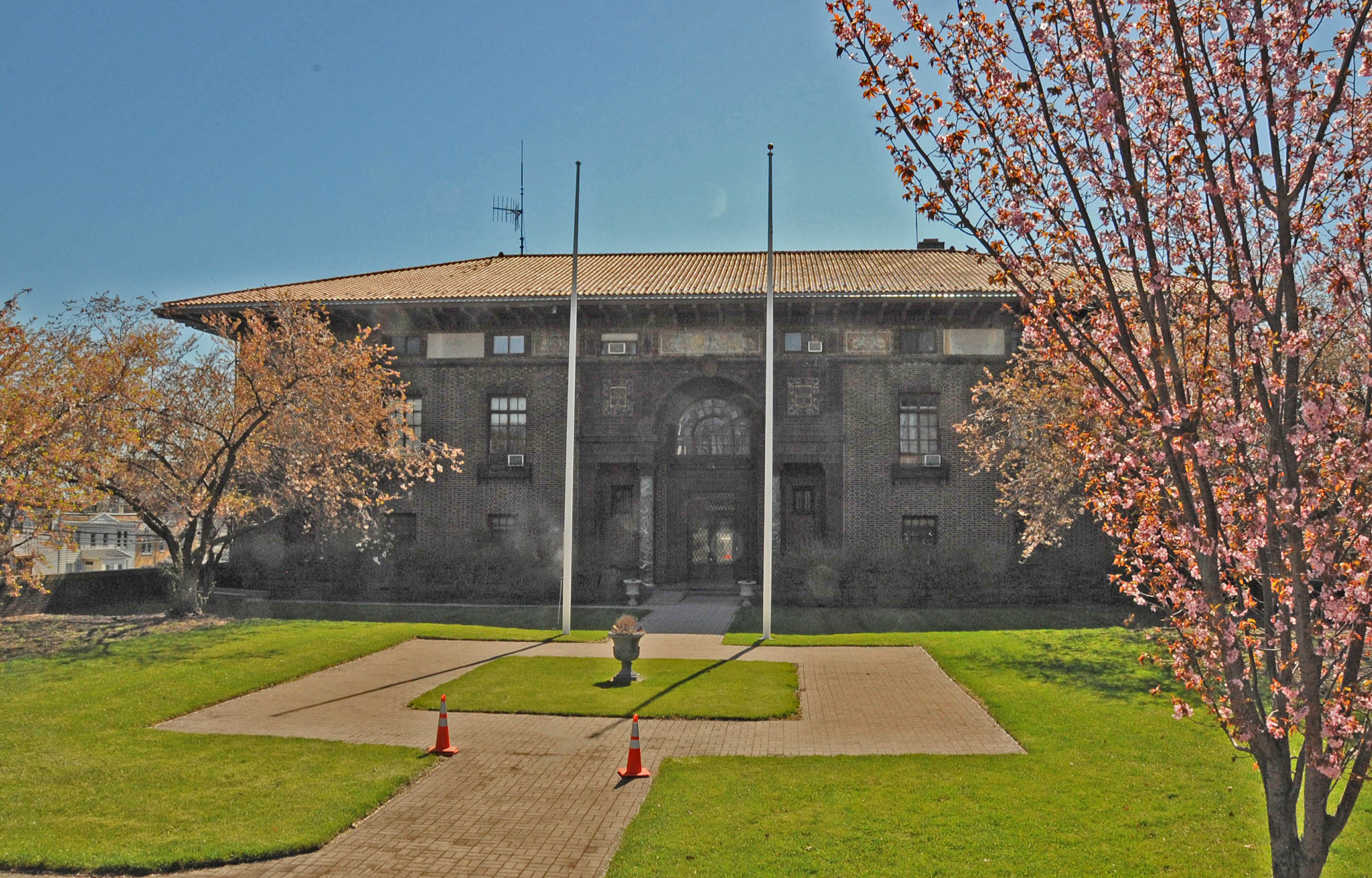
Administration Building

The Essex County Park System comprises the county-run parks of Essex County, New Jersey. The Essex County Department of Parks, Recreation and Cultural Affairs is in charge of the upkeep and preservation of the parks, reservations and a number of other facilities, including golf courses and trails. In 1905 a book about the park system was authored by Frederick W. Kelsey: The First County Park System: A Complete History of the Inception and Development of the Essex County Parks of New Jersey on Open Library at the Internet Archive

== Parks ==
- Anderson Park
- Becker Park
- Belleville Park
- Branch Brook Park
- Brookdale Park
- Glenfield Park
- Grover Cleveland Park
- Independence Park
- Irvington Park
- Ivy Hill Park
- Kip's Castle Park
- Orange Park
- Riverbank Park
- RiverFront Park
- Vailsburg Park
- Verona Park
- Veterans Memorial Park
- Watsessing Park
- Weequahic Park
- West Side Park
- Yanticaw Park

== Reservations ==
- Eagle Rock Reservation
- Hilltop Reservation
- Mills Reservation
- South Mountain Reservation
- West Essex Park

== Other facilities ==
- Francis A. Byrne Golf Course
- Hendricks Field Golf Course
- Lenape Trail
- Riker Hill Complex
- South Mountain Recreation Complex
- Weequahic Golf Course
- West Essex Trail

== See also ==
- Essex County Park Commission Administration Building
- Hudson County Park System
