= Lenape Trail =

Hiking trail between Newark & Millburn, New Jersey

Coordinates: 40.73544°N 74.1643°W

- Length: approx. 34 mi (54.7 km)
- Location: Essex County, New Jersey
- Trailheads: Ironbound, Newark; West Essex Park, Fairfield
- Use: Hiking
- Elevation change: 660 ft (200 m)
- Highest point: Eagle Rock, Eagle Rock Reservation
- Lowest point: Ferry Street east of Five Corners
- Difficulty: Moderate

The Lenape Trail is a trail through Essex County, connecting many county parks and reservations, wooded spaces, and historical sites. It begins in Newark, New Jersey and ends in Millburn, New Jersey. It was established in 1982. It is the fifth longest trail in the state behind the Delaware and Raritan Canal Trail, the Appalachian Trail, the completed section of the Highlands Trail in the state and the Batona Trail. The Lenape trail traverses Newark and its suburbs, as well as the Watchung Mountains and Passaic Meadows. Because of the steepness of the Watchung Mountains and the flood-prone nature of the Passaic Meadows, the former basin of Glacial Lake Passaic, these areas have remained much less developed than the rest of the northeastern part of the state. This trail therefore offers hikers an opportunity to see cultural and historical sites of an urban trail, as well as large natural and undeveloped areas. The trail's proximity to New York City and the various ridges it traverses, including Forest Hill, Orange Mountain (part of First Watchung Mountain), and Second Watchung Mountain, offer many views of the skyline. The Lenape Trail forms a segment of the Liberty-Water Gap Trail and incorporates the West Essex Trail, the Lenape Trail's only rail-to-trail section. The Lenape Trail also connects with Morris County's Patriots Path trail system on its western terminus.

The Lenape Trail is maintained by volunteers of the New York-New Jersey Trail Conference in partnership with local park conservancies and the Essex County Park System. Full maps of the trail can be found at LenapeTrail.org.

== Historical and cultural sites ==
- Ferry Street in the Ironbound
- Penn Station
- Military Park
- The New Jersey Historical Society
- NJPAC
- Newark Museum
- Sydenham House (Newark's oldest house)
- Cathedral Basilica of the Sacred Heart
- Kingsland Manor in Nutley
- Kips Castle in Montclair
- Morris Canal remnants
- Riker Hill Fossil Site
- Washington Rock, a Revolutionary War historic site, dating back to the late 18th century when Beacon Signal Station 9 was located here—one of 23 beacons built by General Washington to observe British troop movements quartered on Staten Island and New York City.

== Route ==
The Lenape Trail's eastern terminus is in Newark's Ironbound district and continues through Downtown Newark and the Frederick Law Olmsted-designed Branch Brook Park, the largest park in Newark. Branch Brook Park is home to the city's Cherry Blossom Festival with 3,500 cherry trees and the most diverse cherry blossom display in the country. Leaving Newark the trail continues west through Belleville, Nutley, Bloomfield, Montclair, Cedar Grove, Verona, West Orange, and Roseland traversing the Watchung Mountains before reaching its western terminus at the Passaic River. The trail changes from sidewalks to surfaced trails to dirt trails and aqueducts throughout its length. The trail also passes through Newark's Hayes Park, Military Park, Washington Park, Branch Brook Park, Belleville's Belleville Park, Nutley's Booth Park, Yantacaw Park, Memorial Park, Kingsland Park, Bloomfield's Clarks Pond Nature Preserve, Brookdale Park (in Bloomfield and Montclair), Yantacaw Brook Municipal Park, Mountainside Park in Montclair, Mills Reservation, Verona Park, Eagle Rock Reservation, O'Connor Park in West Orange, Becker Park in Roseland, Lurker Park in East Hanover and Hatfield Swamp, which is part of the Passaic Meadows.

=== Western section ===
The trail continues through Branch Brook Park with yellow blazes. After traveling north through Branch Brook Park, the trail follows sidewalks and aqueducts through Belleville and Nutley before crossing over the Garden State Parkway on a pedestrian bridge. The trail travels through Bloomfield partially through parks and along Watchung Avenue before crossing Brookdale Park, passing Applegate Farm, crossing the Montclair-Boonton Line and entering the Mills Reservation. The trail combines after this with the West Essex Trail on the former Caldwell Branch of the Erie Railroad. The trail continues in Verona on the old Erie Railroad line and follows sidewalks once again before passing through Verona Park and then Eagle Rock Reservation.

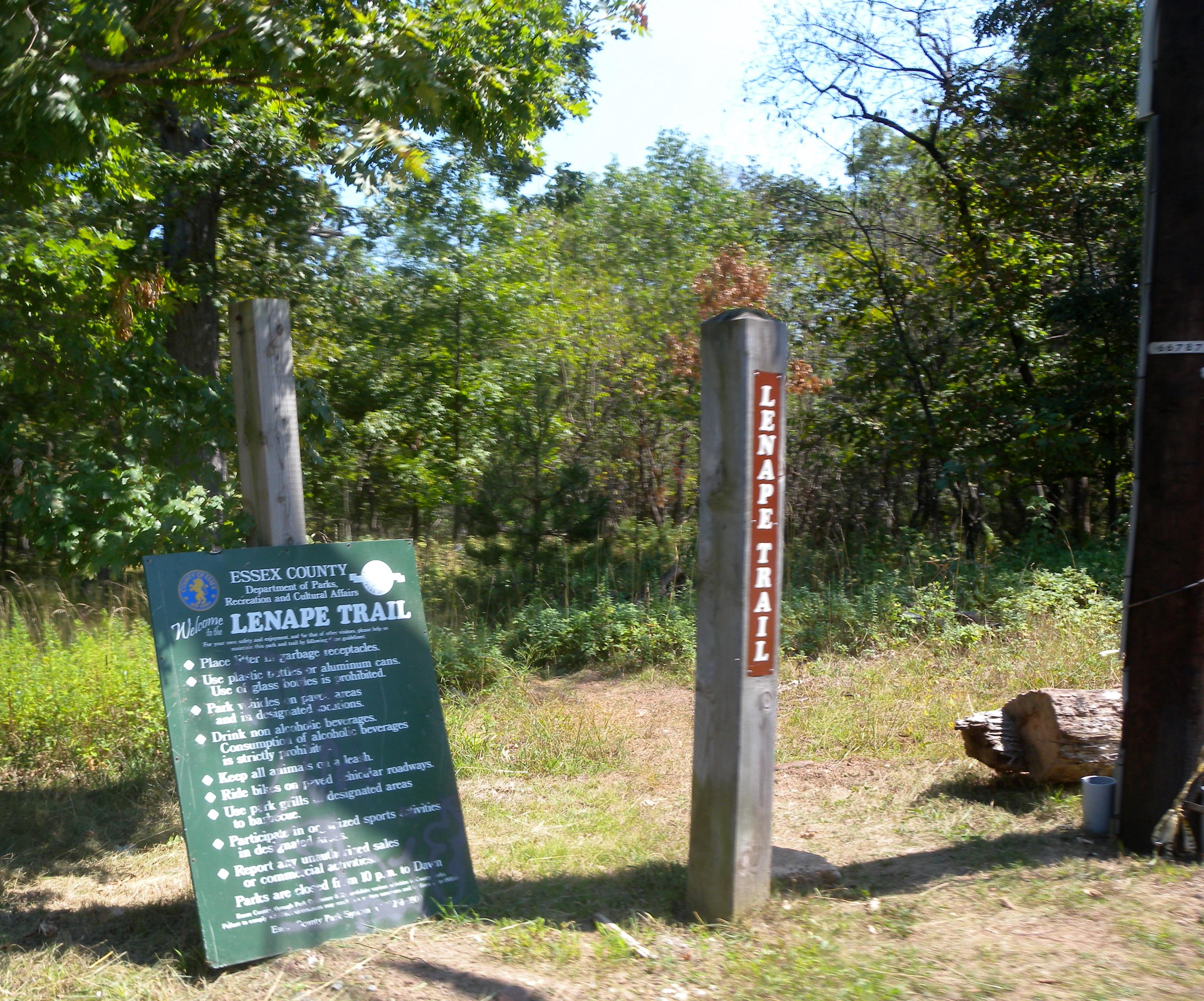
Eagle Rock Reservation

The trail passes the Eagle Rock lookout on the Orange Mountain ridge of the First Watchung Mountain, with views of the New York Skyline, and goes under I-280 and follows power lines over the Second Watchung Mountain. A side trail leads through the South Mountain Reservation, between Orange Mountain and Second Watchung Mountain, through Locust Grove in Millburn. The Lenape Trail continues through Becker Park (a former dairy farm). Here there is a blue side trail to the Walter Kidde Dinosaur Park. This park has thousands of dinosaur tracks, including the smallest ones ever found. The Lenape Trail continues west across the Morristown and Erie Railway tracks and passes under I-280. The Lenape Trail continues along Hatfield Swamp before ending at the Essex County Environmental Center and leading on to the Patriots' Path, which similarly traverses Morris County.

== See also ==
- Assunpink Trail
- Great Trail
