= Cedar Grove Schools =

School district in Essex County, New Jersey, US

Address
- 520 Pompton Avenue Cedar Grove, Essex County, New Jersey, 07009; United States
- Coordinates: 40.851206°N 74.229477°W

District information
- Grades: PreK-12
- Superintendent: Anthony Grosso
- Business administrator: Michael DeVita
- Schools: 4

Students and staff
- Enrollment: 1,602 (as of 2020–21)
- Faculty: 152.0 FTEs
- Student–teacher ratio: 10.5:1

Other information
- District Factor Group: I
- Website: Official website
Ind.	Per pupil	District spending	Rank (*)	K-12 average	%± vs. average
1A	Total Spending	$17,166	16	$18,891	−9.1%
1	Budgetary Cost	13,544	23	14,783	−8.4%
2	Classroom Instruction	7,106	8	8,763	−18.9%
6	Support Services	1,871	17	2,392	−21.8%
8	Administrative Cost	1,980	45	1,485	33.3%
10	Operations & Maintenance	2,096	44	1,783	17.6%
13	Extracurricular Activities	488	32	268	82.1%
16	Median Teacher Salary	57,563	17	64,043
Data from NJDoE 2014 Taxpayers' Guide to Education Spending. *Of K-12 districts with up to 1,800 students. Lowest spending=1; Highest=49

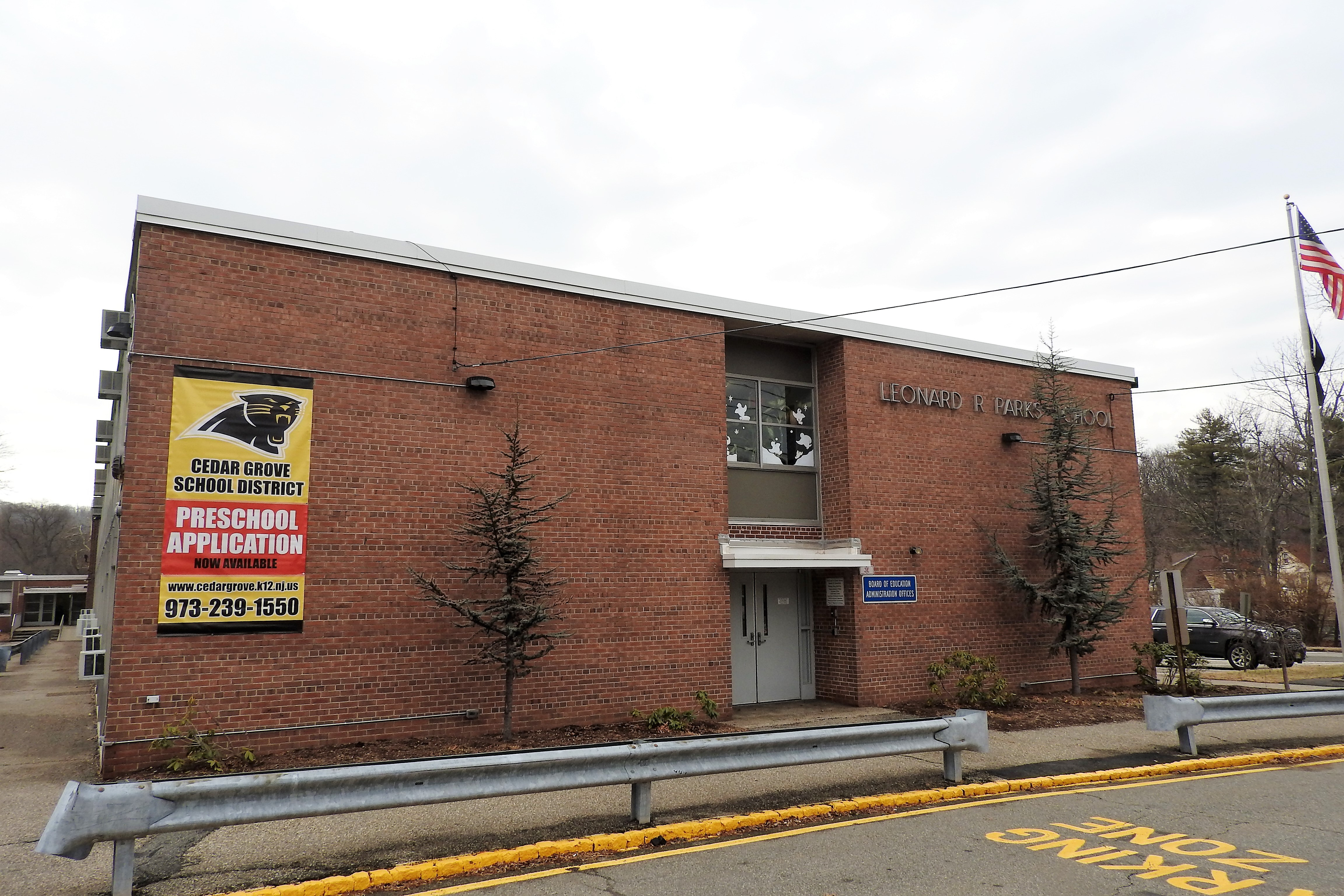

The Cedar Grove Schools are a comprehensive community public school district that serves students in pre-kindergarten through twelfth grade from Cedar Grove, in Essex County, in the U.S. state of New Jersey.

As of the 2020–21 school year, the district, comprising four schools, had an enrollment of 1,602 students and 152.0 classroom teachers (on an FTE basis), for a student–teacher ratio of 10.5:1.

The district is classified by the New Jersey Department of Education as being in District Factor Group "I", the second-highest of eight groupings. District Factor Groups organize districts statewide to allow comparison by common socioeconomic characteristics of the local districts. From lowest socioeconomic status to highest, the categories are A, B, CD, DE, FG, GH, I and J.

== Awards and recognition ==
In September 2021, North End School was one of nine schools in New Jersey recognized by the National Blue Ribbon Schools Program.

== Schools ==
Schools in the district (with 2020–21 enrollment data from the National Center for Education Statistics) are:

Elementary schools

- North End Elementary School with 278 students in grades PreK-4
  - Traci Dyer, principal
- South End Elementary School with 332 students in grades PreK-4
  - Lynn DiMatteo, principal

Middle school

- Cedar Grove Memorial Middle School with 454 students in grades 5–8
  - Nicholas DeCorte, principal

High school

- Cedar Grove High School with 507 students in grades 9–12
  - Jody Inglis, principal

== Administration ==
Core members of the district's administration are:

- Anthony Grosso, superintendent
- Michael DeVita, business administrator and board secretary

== Board of education ==
The district's board of education is composed of five members who set policy and oversee the fiscal and educational operation of the district through its administration. As a Type II school district, the board's trustees are elected directly by voters to serve three-year terms of office on a staggered basis, with either one or two seats up for election each year held (since 2012) as part of the November general election. The board appoints a superintendent to oversee the district's day-to-day operations and a business administrator to supervise the business functions of the district.
