= Essex County Hospital Center =

Psychiatric hospital in New Jersey, US

The Essex County Hospital Center, also known as the Overbrook Hospital, the Overbrook Asylum, or simply the Overbrook, was a psychiatric hospital that was located around 125 Fairview Avenue in the Township of Cedar Grove, New Jersey. It was founded as a mental hospital to relieve the Essex County Asylum for the Insane in Newark. The site of the hospital now contains a park and townhomes, and a new hospital was built nearby.

== History ==
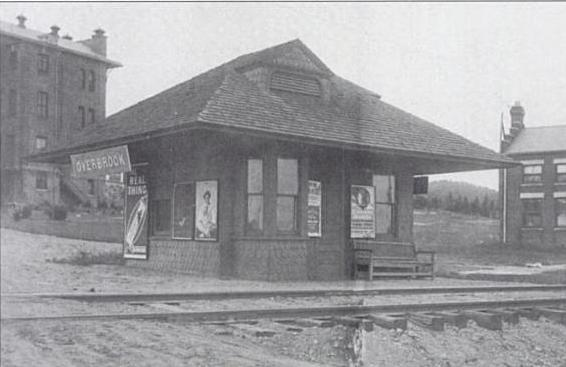
Hospital is partly visible to the left of Overbrook Station

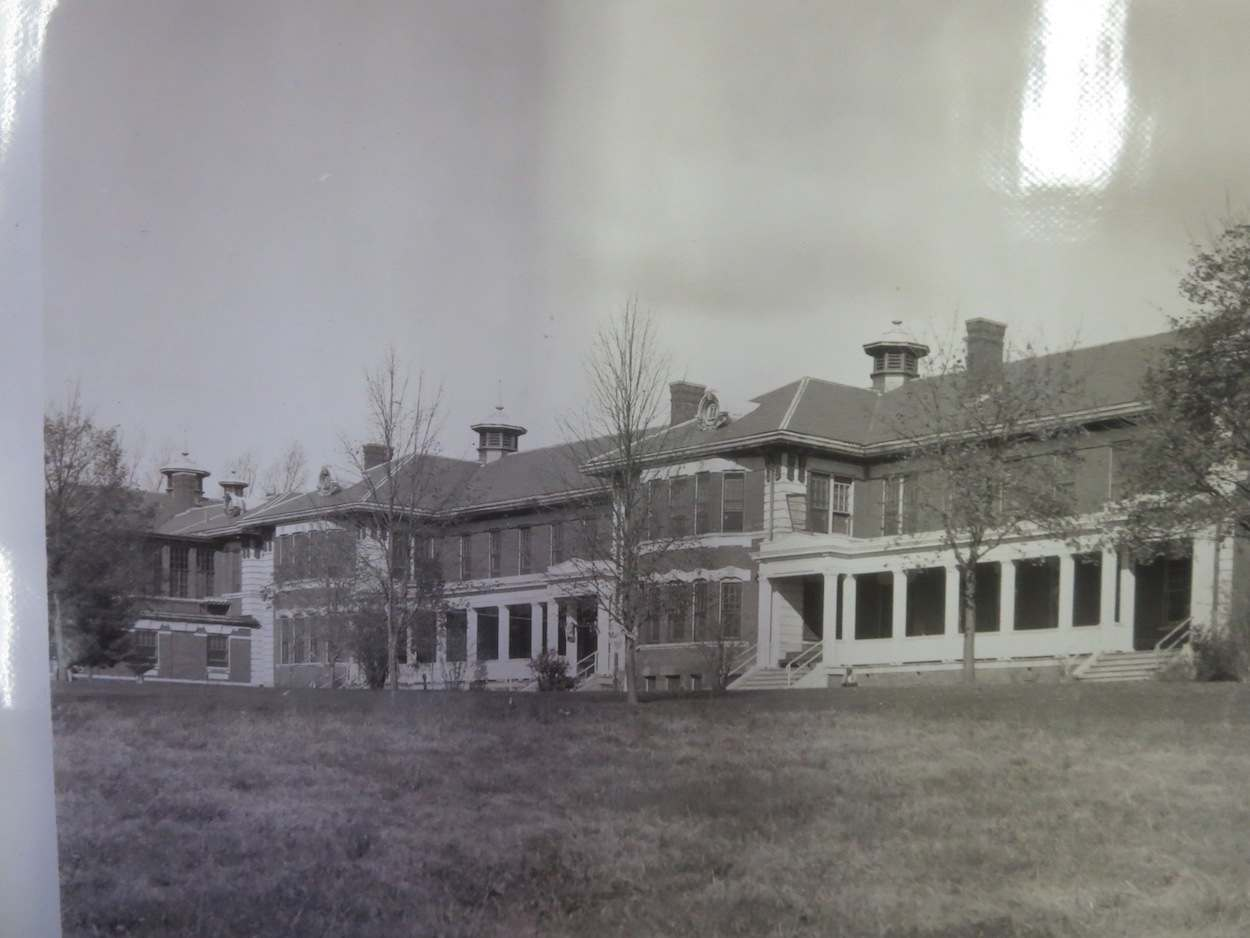
Hill Wards built in 1909 picture taken in 1930s

In 1896, a large portion of land was purchased by Essex County; the land was bought to build a new hospital to relieve pressure in the overcrowded Essex County Asylum for the Insane in Newark. The hospital opened at the end of 1898. During the late 1800s and early 1900s, many buildings were built that housed patients and other facilities, such as a power house, laundromat, and theater. According to Weird New Jersey, in the winter of 1917, the hospital suffered a catastrophe with the failure of the hospital's boilers; there were 24 deaths that December, compared to 8 in 1916 As the years went on, many additions were built, with the hospital sometimes housing up to 3000 patients. The hospital closed in 2007 and the buildings were slowly demolished.

== New hospital ==
In late 2006, construction was completed on the new Essex County Hospital Center, opened just down the road from the site of the original Overbrook Hospital. This center houses chronically ill psychiatric patients in need of longer lengths of stay than are available in community hospitals and medical centers. The new center takes a cutting edge approach to behavioral health care and its layout and programs stand in stark contrast to the hundred-year-old facility it replaced. It is located at 204 Grove Avenue in Cedar Grove.

== Future of the former hospital ==
After years of back and forth about what the old hospitals in Cedar Grove were to become, county spokesman Anthony Puglisi stated that the property of these hospitals will become a park. This statement was made in 2015 and the project was completed in 2017. The vast 77 acres purchased by the county now is partially Cedar Grove Park. The remaining space was turned into townhomes and condominiums.

== Directors ==
- Dr. Joseph Sutton from 1950-1957
- Henry Alexander Davidson from 1957 to 1969
- Arnold Kallen from 1969 to 1973
- Felix Ucko from 1973 to 1980
- Arthur Avella from 1980 to 1991
