= Mills Reservation =

County park in Essex County, New Jersey

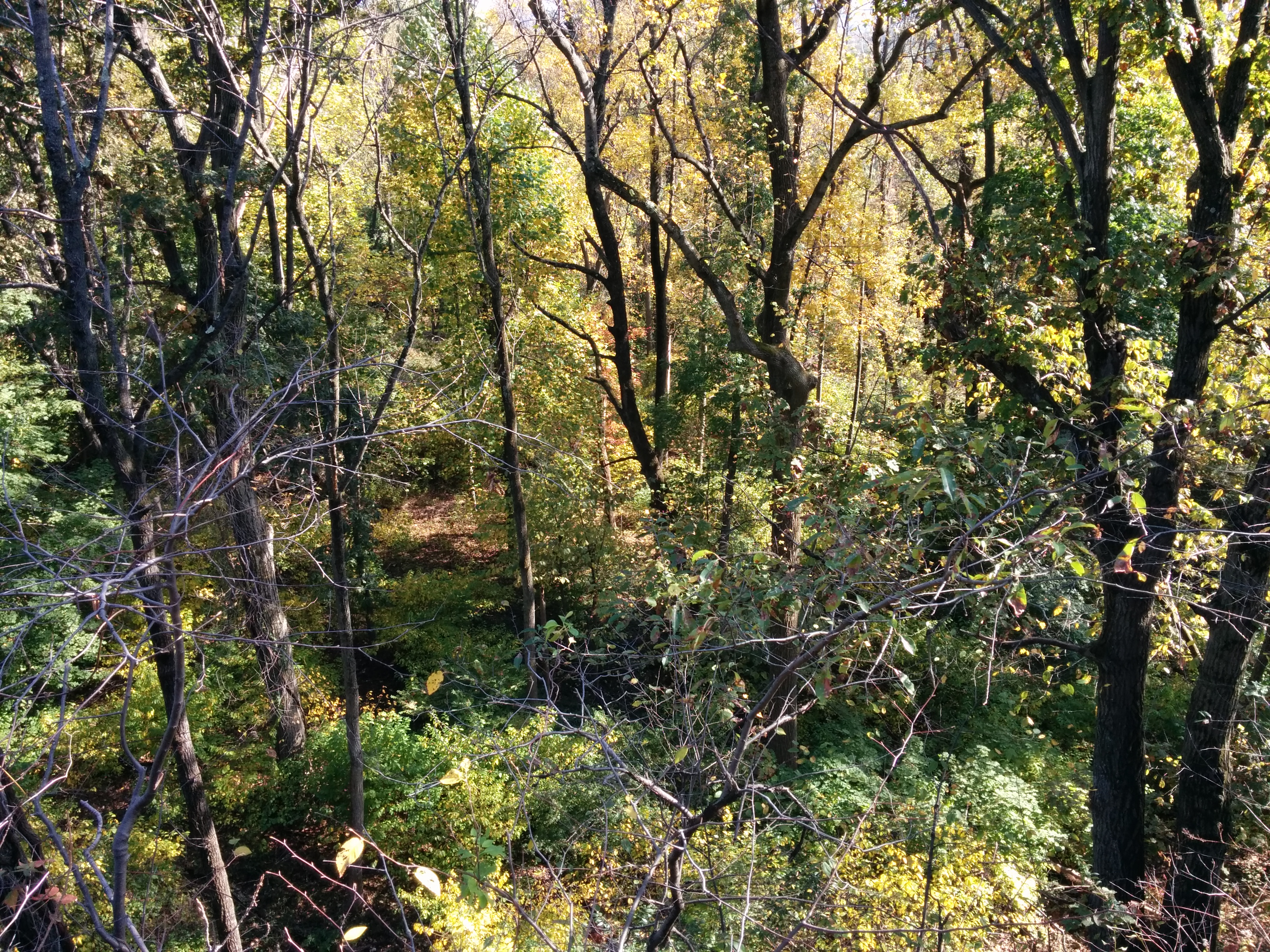
- Mills Reservation in Fall

- Location within New Jersey Location within the United States
- Type: County park
- Location: Montclair, New Jersey and Cedar Grove, New Jersey
- Coordinates: 40.853390°N 74.210586°W
- Area: 157.15 acres (63.60 ha)
- Created: 1954
- Operator: Essex County Department of Parks, Recreation and Cultural Affairs
- Status: Open all year
- Website: https://www.essexcountyparks.org/parks/mills-reservation

Mills Reservation is a county park, consisting of a 157.15-acre (0.6360 km^{2}) protected wooded area located in Cedar Grove and Montclair, New Jersey, United States. The reservation is maintained by the Essex County Park Commission. The reservation has several walking and jogging trails, including the Lenape Trail, four major trails, and two smaller trails. One of the four main trails leads to a cliff that overlooks the New York City skyline.

Mills Reservation is located on the First Watchung Mountain, one of three Watchung Mountains which are long, low ridges of volcanic origin in northern New Jersey.

== Geography ==
Mills Reservation is located atop First Watchung Mountain in Montclair, New Jersey and Cedar Grove, New Jersey. It is a 157.15-acre tract of forest, grassland, and cliffs.

Views from Montclair to Newark, the Hudson River, and Manhattan can be seen from Quarry Point, a 500-foot basalt ledge on a ridge on the south end of the park.

== Activities ==
Activities in Mills Reservation include walking, jogging, hiking, and sightseeing of different plants and animal species, as in all forest parks. However, bike riding is prohibited by the county. The New Jersey Audubon Hawk Watch began in 1959 in Mills Reservation. Montclair Hawk Watch meets at the park during each spring for two months, as many raptors' migratory patterns are directly above the reservation.

=== Trails ===
Mills Reservation has a number of walking trails:

- The Mills Loop Trail, marked by white blazes, is a complete loop of the park which extends for one and a half miles and is the main walking trail.
- The Eastview Trail is slightly over one mile long and goes along the east side of the park, and is designated by blue blazes. It can be accessed by the Normal Avenue parking area or by the Old Quarry Road parking area.
- The Woodland Trail is slightly less than one mile long, is marked by purple blazes, and runs down the center of the park.
- The Reservoir Trail is one mile long and goes along the west side of the park, and is marked by red blazes. It can be accessed by the Normal Avenue parking area or by the Old Quarry Road parking area.
- The Lenape Trail, a 34 mile-long trail which runs through many of Essex County's parks and reservations, goes through Mills Reservation for one-and-a-half miles and is marked by yellow blazes. It begins west of the Normal Avenue parking area and exits in Mountainside Park, and can also be accessed through the Old Quarry Road parking area.
- The Lenape Link Trail is a short trail which connects the Normal Avenue parking area and the northern entry of the Lenape Trail into the park, designated by black on yellow blazes.
- The Mills Gate Trail is a side loop of the Mills Loop Trail marked by orange blazes.

== History ==
From 1890 to 1918, proprietors Osborne & Marsellis operated a quarry below what is now Quarry Point on the south end of the reservation, using steam power to blast rock from the side of the cliff. In 1952, David and Ella Mills of the Davella Mills Foundation purchased 118 acres of the land in order to preserve it, and donated it to Essex County. The park was designed by the Olmsted Brothers.

During World War II, the 13th of many military searchlights across the metropolitan area was installed in Mills Reservation at Quarry Point, overlooking New York City. The searchlight was eventually removed from the spot, leaving a large concrete circle in its place. Earlier the platform may have been the base of a water tower for the steam machinery and fire fighting system of the quarry there of Osborne & Marselis etc.

There are also some reports that that cliff-edge location was used as a fire-beacon station in George Washington's communication, and earlier as a smoke-signal point by the Indians.
