= Henry Davison =

Henry Davison may refer to:

- Henry Davison (judge) (1805–1860), British India judge
- Henry Pomeroy Davison (1867–1922), American banker and philanthropist

== See also ==
- Henry Davidson (disambiguation)
