= Orange Park (New Jersey) =

Park in New Jersey

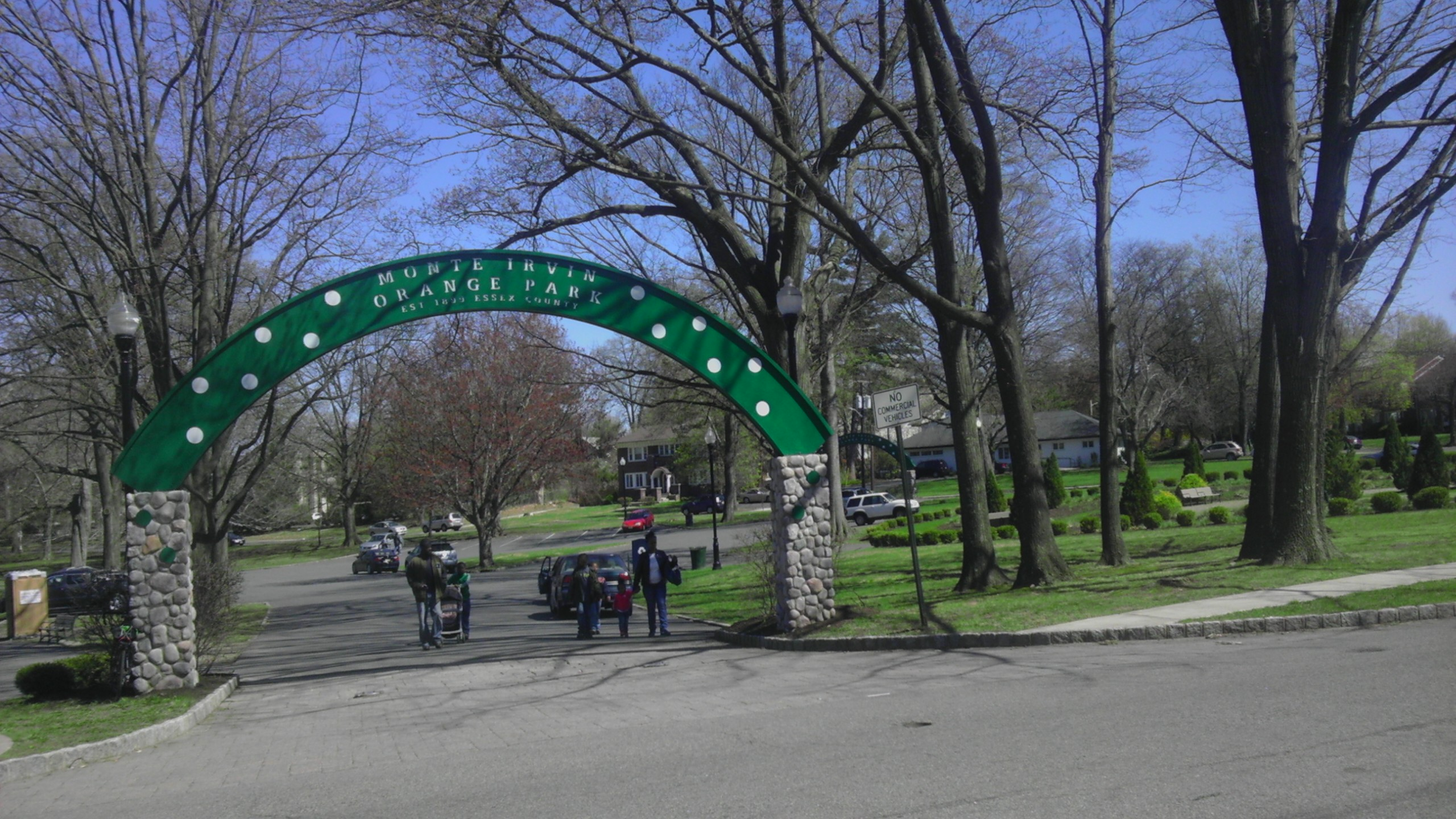
- Southwest entrance
- Interactive map of Orange Park
- Type: Public Park
- Location: Orange, New Jersey
- Coordinates: 40.764811°N 74.230356°W
- Area: 47.63 acres (192,800 m^{2})
- Created: 1900
- Operator: Essex County Park System
- Open: All year
- Website: http://www.essex-countynj.org/p/index.php?section=parks/sites/gl&ImgLoc=images/gl

Orange Park (formally Monte Irvin Orange Park) is a county park in the City of Orange, in Essex County, New Jersey, United States, located near the city's border with East Orange. The park has a playground, basketball court, soccer field and man-made lake. The park was constructed in 1899 and opened the following year.

Orange resident Frederick W. Kelsey was the main impetus for the creation of the Essex County Park System with the introduction of a resolution that led to the formation of a five-member parks commission in 1894, approved by the New Jersey Supreme Court. Efforts were underway in 1896 to purchase the land in Orange / East Orange, as well as in other areas around the county, with many of the land purchases made anonymously in an effort to avoid tipping off speculators. The property that became Orange Park was acquired in 1897, making it one of the first purchases of land in the Essex County network and one of the nation's oldest parks. The park covers 47.63 acres (19.28 ha), making it the sixth-largest in the county system, and the marshy land was purchased for $17,500. Funds totaling $100,000 were set aside to drain the swamp and to perform the needed improvements in the park. Designed by the Olmsted Brothers landscape design firm, the park informally opened to the public on August 25, 1900.

An artificial turf soccer field was reconstructed at the park as part of a $1 million project that was completed in August 2009, including a scoreboard and fencing, with the park to be the home field for the Orange High School Tornados soccer teams. The construction was part of a $5 million series of projects that included redevelopment and improvements to baseball fields, basketball courts and playgrounds. The soccer field was developed with a grant of $100,000 from the U.S. Soccer Foundation, as part of its effort to improve the availability of soccer facilities in underserved communities.

The park was renamed in May 2006 for Orange resident and Hall of Famer Monte Irvin, who played for the New York Giants as one of the first African American players in Major League Baseball. A monument was dedicated in the park in April 2007 in memory of Orange Police Detective Kieran T. Shields, who was killed in the park in August 2006 while trying to arrest an armed suspect.
