= Cedar Grove, New Jersey =

Township in Essex County, New Jersey, US

- Township
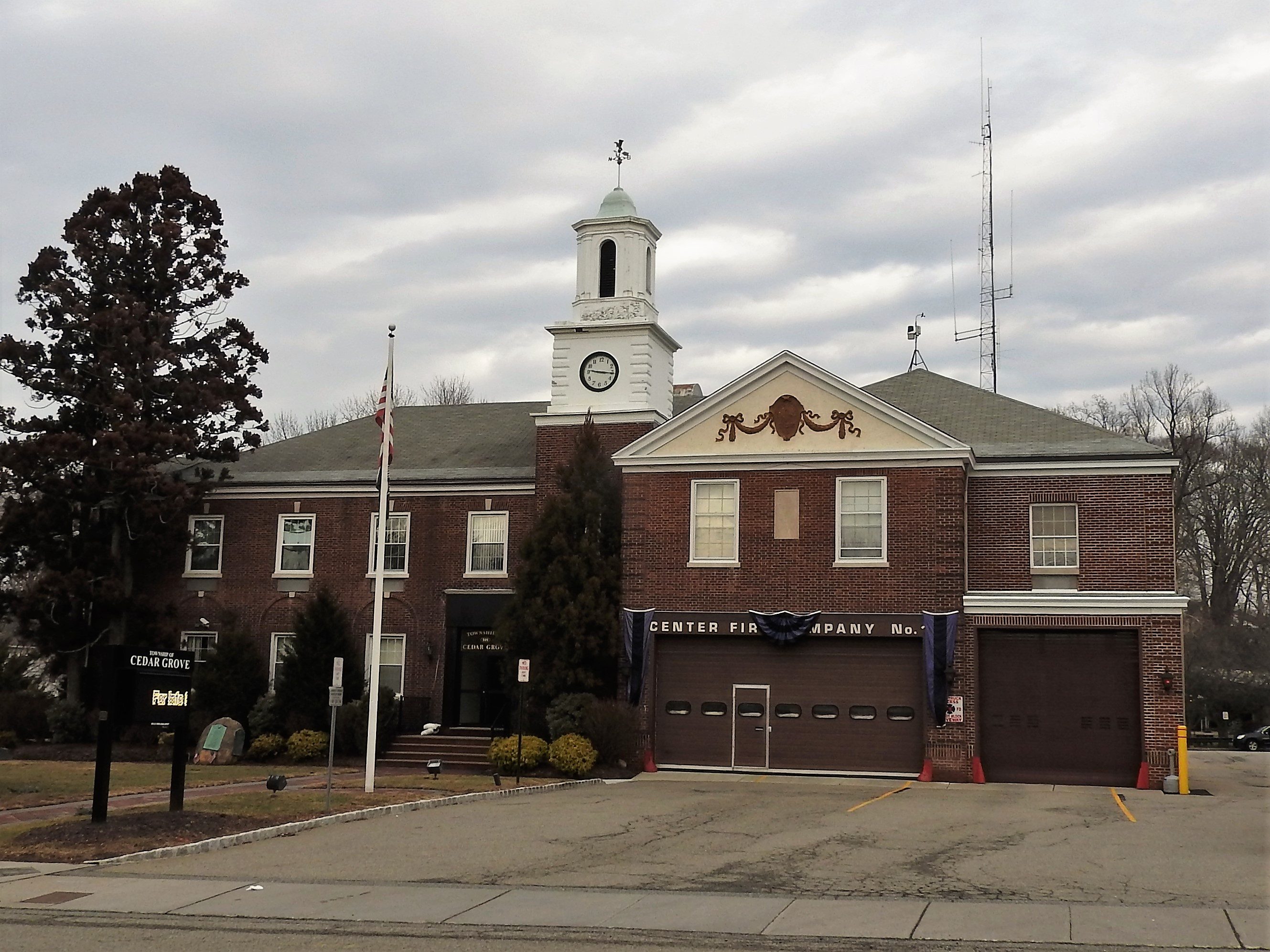
- Cedar Grove Municipal Building and Center Fire Company

- logo

- Location of Cedar Grove in Essex County highlighted in red (right). Inset map: Location of Essex County in New Jersey highlighted in orange (left).

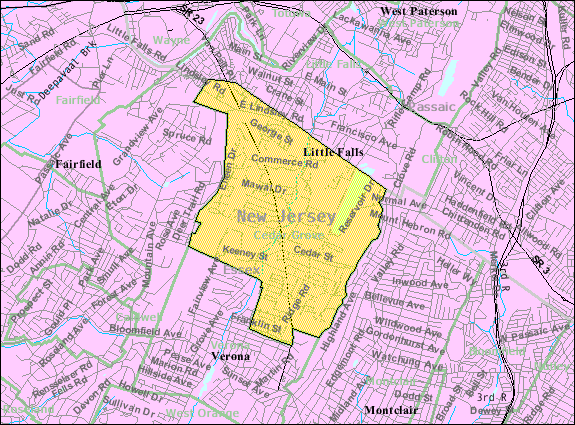
- Census Bureau map of Cedar Grove, New Jersey

- Location in Essex County Location in New Jersey Location in the United States
- Coordinates: 40.858017°N 74.229784°W
- Country: United States
- State: New Jersey
- County: Essex
- Incorporated: February 7, 1892 as Verona Township
- Renamed: April 9, 1908 as Cedar Grove
- Named for: Cedar trees

Government
  - Type: Faulkner Act (council–manager)
  - Body: Township Council
  - Mayor: Joseph Maceri (term ends June 30, 2026)
  - Manager: Joseph M. Zichelli
  - Municipal clerk: Dale A. Forde

Area
  - Total: 4.36 sq mi (11.29 km^{2})
  - Land: 4.24 sq mi (10.97 km^{2})
  - Water: 0.12 sq mi (0.32 km^{2}) 2.82%
  - Rank: 286th of 565 in state 9th of 22 in county
- Elevation: 243 ft (74 m)

Population (2020)
  - Total: 12,980
  - Estimate (2024): 13,766
  - Rank: 196th of 565 in state 15th of 22 in county
  - Density: 3,063.5/sq mi (1,182.8/km^{2})
  - Rank: 214th of 565 in state 15th of 22 in county
- Time zone: UTC−05:00 (Eastern (EST))
  - Summer (DST): UTC−04:00 (Eastern (EDT))
- ZIP Code: 07009
- Area code: 973
- FIPS code: 3401311200
- GNIS feature ID: 0882222
- Website: www.cedargrovenj.org

Cedar Grove is a township in north central Essex County, in the U.S. state of New Jersey. As of the 2020 United States census, the township's population was 12,980, an increase of 569 (+4.6%) from the 2010 census count of 12,411, which in turn reflected an increase of 111 (+0.9%) from the 12,300 counted in the 2000 census.

New Jersey Monthly magazine ranked Cedar Grove as its fourth-best place to live in Essex County and 17th-best place overall to live in its 2008 rankings of the "Best Places To Live" in New Jersey.

What is now Cedar Grove was originally incorporated by an act of the New Jersey Legislature as the Township of Verona on February 7, 1892, from portions of Caldwell Township. Portions of the township were taken to create Verona borough, based on the results of a referendum held on April 30, 1907. On April 9, 1908, the name was formally changed to Cedar Grove. The township's name derives from the Eastern Red Cedar trees that once covered its valley and hillsides.

== History ==
Cedar Grove was part of the Horseneck Tract, which was an area that consisted of what are now the municipalities of Caldwell, West Caldwell, North Caldwell, Fairfield, Verona, Cedar Grove, Essex Fells, Roseland, and portions of Livingston and West Orange.

In 1702, settlers purchased the 14,000 acres (57 km^{2}) Horseneck Tract—so-called because of its irregular shape that suggested a horse's neck and head from the Lenape Native Americans for goods equal to $325. This purchase encompassed much of western Essex County, from the First Mountain to the Passaic River.

Cedar Grove was originally a small farming community. In 1896, Essex County built the county mental institution in Cedar Grove known as Overbrook. In 1908, Cedar Grove was incorporated as a township. In the 1950s and 1960s, Cedar Grove became one of the destination suburbs in Essex County among those looking to escape urban living from Newark and New York City.

Cedar Grove was once home to Frank Dailey's Meadowbrook Ballroom, located on Route 23, which regularly hosted well-known bands and vocalists, including Buddy Rich, Glenn Miller, Jimmy and Tommy Dorsey, Frank Sinatra, and Jo Stafford. The ballroom, located on the old Pompton Turnpike, still stands, and is used by Sts. Kiril & Methodij Macedonian Orthodox Church. The first dinner theater was opened at the Meadowbrook in the fall of 1959 by Gary and Helga McHugh. It closed in 1973.

== Geography ==
According to the United States Census Bureau, the township had a total area of 4.36 square miles (11.29 km^{2}), including 4.24 square miles (10.97 km^{2}) of land and 0.12 square miles (0.32 km^{2}) of water (2.82%).

The township is located between the First and Second Watchung Mountains. The center of the township is in a valley that is about 280 feet (85 m) above sea level; however, many sections of Cedar Grove are well above 400 feet (120 m), including the Park Ridge Estates, the abandoned Essex County Hospital Center, and the eastern, southeastern and southern sections of Cedar Grove. Cedar Grove's highest point is on hilltop, where elevations reach 600 feet (180 m) and above. Cedar Grove is located approximately 12 miles (19 km) west of Midtown Manhattan and 4 miles (6.4 km) northwest of Newark.

Unincorporated communities, localities and place names located partially or completely within the township include Lindsley and Overbrook.

Cedar Grove is bordered by the municipalities of Montclair, North Caldwell and Verona in Essex County; and Little Falls in Passaic County. Most of the eastern portion of the township is bordered by Upper Montclair (a neighborhood in Montclair).

=== Neighborhoods ===
The sections of Cedar Grove are:

North End: The North End of Cedar Grove starts after the corner of Fairview Avenue and Pompton Avenue. It consists mostly of homes, but there are some businesses located on Pompton Avenue, and at the corner of E. Lindsley Road and Stevens Avenue. A notable part of the north end of town is the Park Ridge Estates, which contains million-dollar homes.

Central Cedar Grove: This consists of the center of town and extends from the corner of Fairview Avenue and Pompton Avenue to the corner of Bradford Avenue and Pompton Avenue. The central portion of the town contains Cedar Grove's business district. Also, on the west central side of town is the former location of the Essex County Hospital Center, and on the east central side is the Cedar Grove Reservoir and Mills Reservation.

South End: The south end of Cedar Grove is the most urbanized part of the township, as it contains homes that are closer together. The south end extends from the corner of Bradford Avenue and Pompton Avenue to the Verona border. There are mostly homes here, but there are some businesses on Pompton Avenue. Like the north end of town, the south end contains a section of million dollar homes.

Cedar Grove's population density is less than the surrounding towns of Montclair, Verona, and Little Falls, mainly because significant portions of Cedar Grove are owned or previously owned by county or city governments. The Essex County Hospital Center took up a good amount of land and was owned by Essex County. Mills Reservation is a county-owned park, and the Cedar Grove Reservoir property is owned by the City of Newark.

=== Climate ===
Cedar Grove has a humid continental climate, with warm/hot humid summers and cool/cold winters. The climate is slightly colder overall during the summer and winter than in New York City because the urban heat island effect is not as prevalent.

January tends to be the coldest month, with average high temperatures in the upper 30s and low 40s °F (2 to 6 °C) and lows in the lower to mid 20s °F (-6 to -2 °C). July is the warmest months with high temperatures in the mid 80s °F (29 to 30 °C) and lows in the mid 60s °F (17 to 18 °C). From April to June and from September to early November, Cedar Grove enjoys temperatures from the lower 60s to upper 70s °F (16 to 25 °C). Rainfall is plentiful, with around 44 inches (1,100 mm) a year. Snowfall is common from mid January to early March and nor'easters can bring a lot of snow. In January 1996, Cedar Grove received record snowfall of about 3 feet (0.91 m) from the Blizzard of 1996.

Climate data for Cedar Grove, New Jersey
Month	Jan	Feb	Mar	Apr	May	Jun	Jul	Aug	Sep	Oct	Nov	Dec	Year
Mean daily maximum °F (°C)	38.0 (3.3)	41.0 (5.0)	50.0 (10.0)	60.6 (15.9)	71.2 (21.8)	80.0 (26.7)	84.9 (29.4)	83.0 (28.3)	75.4 (24.1)	64.5 (18.1)	53.3 (11.8)	43.0 (6.1)	62.0 (16.7)
Mean daily minimum °F (°C)	22.4 (−5.3)	24.5 (−4.2)	33.9 (1.1)	43.4 (6.3)	53.0 (11.7)	62.9 (17.2)	68.0 (20.0)	66.5 (19.2)	58.9 (14.9)	47.4 (8.6)	38.8 (3.8)	28.0 (−2.2)	45.8 (7.7)
Average precipitation inches (mm)	3.98 (101)	2.96 (75)	4.21 (107)	3.92 (100)	4.46 (113)	3.40 (86)	4.68 (119)	4.02 (102)	4.01 (102)	3.16 (80)	3.88 (99)	3.57 (91)	46.25 (1,175)
Average snowfall inches (cm)	8.9 (23)	8.4 (21)	4.3 (11)	.8 (2.0)	0 (0)	0 (0)	0 (0)	0 (0)	0 (0)	0 (0)	.6 (1.5)	3.0 (7.6)	26.0 (66)
Average precipitation days (≥ 0.01 in)	10.5	9.9	10.9	10.8	11.7	10.7	10.0	9.6	9.0	8.3	9.5	10.7	121.6
Average snowy days (≥ 0.1 in)	4.9	4.1	2.3	.4	0	0	0	0	0	0	.4	2.3	14.4
Source: NOAA

As of 2026, the township is a member of Local Leaders for Responsible Planning in order to address the township's Mount Laurel doctrine-based housing obligations.

== Demographics ==
Historical population
Census	Pop.	Note	%±
1900	2,139		—
1910	2,409		12.6%
1920	3,181		32.0%
1930	4,793		50.7%
1940	5,208		8.7%
1950	8,022		54.0%
1960	14,603		82.0%
1970	15,582		6.7%
1980	12,600		−19.1%
1990	12,053		−4.3%
2000	12,300		2.0%
2010	12,411		0.9%
2020	12,980		4.6%
2024 (est.)	13,766		6.1%
Population sources: 1900–1920; 1900–1910 1910–1930; 1940–2000 2000; 2010 2020

=== 2020 census ===
Cedar Grove township, Essex County, New Jersey – Racial and Ethnic Composition (NH = Non-Hispanic) Note: the US Census treats Hispanic/Latino as an ethnic category. This table excludes Latinos from the racial categories and assigns them to a separate category. Hispanics/Latinos may be of any race.
Race / Ethnicity	Pop 2010	Pop 2020	% 2010	% 2020
White alone (NH)	10,475	9,754	84.40%	75.15%
Black or African American alone (NH)	294	305	2.37%	2.35%
Native American or Alaska Native alone (NH)	3	18	0.02%	0.14%
Asian alone (NH)	800	1,016	6.45%	7.83%
Pacific Islander alone (NH)	1	2	0.01%	0.02%
Some Other Race alone (NH)	13	65	0.10%	0.50%
Mixed Race/Multi-Racial (NH)	98	355	0.79%	2.73%
Hispanic or Latino (any race)	727	1,465	5.86%	11.29%
Total	12,411	12,980	100.00%	100.00%

=== 2010 census ===
The 2010 United States census counted 12,411 people, 4,523 households, and 3,216 families in the township. The population density was 2,918.6 per square mile (1,126.9/km^{2}). There were 4,661 housing units at an average density of 1,096.1 per square mile (423.2/km^{2}). The racial makeup was 89.01% (11,047) White, 2.47% (306) Black or African American, 0.05% (6) Native American, 6.53% (811) Asian, 0.01% (1) Pacific Islander, 0.85% (106) from other races, and 1.08% (134) from two or more races. Hispanic or Latino of any race were 5.86% (727) of the population.

Of the 4,523 households, 29.7% had children under the age of 18; 59.5% were married couples living together; 8.4% had a female householder with no husband present and 28.9% were non-families. Of all households, 25.4% were made up of individuals and 13.7% had someone living alone who was 65 years of age or older. The average household size was 2.57 and the average family size was 3.12.

20.2% of the population were under the age of 18, 5.6% from 18 to 24, 21.6% from 25 to 44, 28.9% from 45 to 64, and 23.7% who were 65 years of age or older. The median age was 46.8 years. For every 100 females, the population had 87.0 males. For every 100 females ages 18 and older there were 82.9 males.

The Census Bureau's 2006–2010 American Community Survey showed that (in 2010 inflation-adjusted dollars) median household income was $95,152 (with a margin of error of +/− $4,156) and the median family income was $117,935 (+/− $15,917). Males had a median income of $81,330 (+/− $13,013) versus $51,525 (+/− $6,616) for females. The per capita income for the borough was $46,514 (+/− $3,662). About none of families and 0.5% of the population were below the poverty line, including 1.3% of those under age 18 and 1.3% of those age 65 or over.

=== 2000 census ===
As of the 2000 United States census there were 12,300 people, 4,403 households, and 3,240 families residing in the township. The population density was 2,913.1 inhabitants per square mile (1,124.8/km^{2}). There were 4,470 housing units at an average density of 1,058.7 per square mile (408.8/km^{2}). The racial makeup of the township was 90.05% White, 2.99% African American, 0.05% Native American, 5.42% Asian, 0.02% Pacific Islander, 0.46% from other races, and 1.00% from two or more races. Hispanic or Latino of any race were 3.20% of the population.

As of the 2000 Census, 29.7% of Cedar Grove's residents identified themselves as being of Italian ancestry (adjusted from the 34.8% reported to reflect the fact that residents reported multiple ancestries), the 18th highest of all municipalities in New Jersey. There was also a large Irish population, accounting for 21.7% of the population in the 2000 census, with another 12.1% of German ancestry.

There were 4,403 households, out of which 28.5% had children under the age of 18 living with them, 63.4% were married couples living together, 7.8% had a female householder with no husband present, and 26.4% were non-families. 23.1% of all households were made up of individuals, and 12.3% had someone living alone who was 65 years of age or older. The average household size was 2.57 and the average family size was 3.05.

In the township the population was spread out, with 19.2% under the age of 18, 5.3% from 18 to 24, 27.0% from 25 to 44, 26.0% from 45 to 64, and 22.5% who were 65 years of age or older. The median age was 44 years. For every 100 females, there were 87.0 males. For every 100 females age 18 and over, there were 83.6 males.

The median income for a household in the township was $78,863, and the median income for a family was $94,475. Males had a median income of $66,197 versus $40,582 for females. The per capita income for the township was $36,558. About 1.1% of families and 2.0% of the population were below the poverty line, including 0.8% of those under age 18 and 3.2% of those age 65 or over.

== Economy ==
Most of the commercial zone in Cedar Grove is located on Route 23. The central business district starts at about Sweetwood Drive and extends to Little Falls Road just after the railroad bridge.

The township has an industrial district located along Commerce Road, which is off Route 23. In this district, there are light industrial factories and different types of commercial businesses.

== Parks and recreation ==
Cedar Grove has several parks and recreational areas within the township. These include county parks, town parks, and recreational areas.

=== County parks ===
There are two county parks located in Cedar Grove.

- Mills Reservation, a county park, consisting of a 157.15-acre (0.6360 km^{2}) protected wooded area with trails for walking and an overlook of New York City.
- Hilltop Reservation, composed of lands in the grounds of the former Essex Mountain Sanitorium, opened in spring 2003.

=== Parks ===
- Community Park – this park is located near the center of the town off Little Falls Road. It features a baseball field, a large field used for various sports, a barbecue area, two playgrounds, a bocce court, and entrances to the Lenape Trail, which provide an opportunity for running, walking, and biking.
- Elmer Bowden Taylor Memorial Park – this park and its recreational facilities is located on Little Falls Road; near Bowden Road. It includes tennis courts, basketball court, small playground, and public bathroom. Named for Elmer Bowden Taylor, Cedar Grove resident killed in action in World War I while flying with the Lafayette Flying Corps.
- South End School Park, This park/playground is located on the grounds of South End Elementary School on Harper Terrace. Features include basketball courts, two baseball fields, and a playground.
- North End School Park is nearly identical to South End School's park.
- Cedar Grove High School, in the back of the high school, there is a quarter-mile track for running or walking. There is also a football field, soccer field, and baseball field.

=== Recreational areas ===
- Tennis courts are located along Little Falls Road, all for public use.
- Cedar Grove Community Pool, a community pool which opened in 1963. It features a large pool with 50-meter lanes and 25-meter lanes, three diving boards (two small and a large one), and a water slide. Also, there is a baby pool for children under five. There is a snack bar for refreshments, sun decks for sunbathing, and basketball courts. The pool is open from the Saturday before Memorial Day to Labor Day.

== Government ==
=== Local government ===
Cedar Grove operates within the Faulkner Act, formally known as the Optional Municipal Charter Law, under Council-Manager plan B form of municipal government, as implemented as of July 1, 1955, based on the recommendations of a Charter Study Commission. The township is one of 42 municipalities (of the 564) statewide that use this form of government. Cedar Grove's governing body is comprised of a five-member Township Council, whose members are elected at-large for four-year terms by the voters of the municipality on a non-partisan basis as part of the municipal elections held on the second Tuesday in May in odd-numbered years. At a reorganization meeting held each July, the council selects a mayor and a deputy mayor from among its members to serve a one-year term of office.

As of 2026, members of the Township Council are Mayor Michele Mega (term on committee ends June 30, 2029; term as mayor ends 2027), Deputy Mayor Joseph Maceri (term on committee and as deputy mayor ends 2027), Kerry Peterson (2029), Melissa Skabich (2029) and John A. Zazzali (2027).

Michele Mega was elected to fill the council seat with a term expiring in June 2025 that had been held by Joseph Zichelli until he resigned from office to that the position as township manager.

In July 2020, Joseph Zichelli was sworn into office to fill the balance of the term of office expiring in June 2021 that had been held by Robbie Vargo until he resigned from office the previous month. In November 2020, Zichelli was elected to serve the balance of the term through June 2021.

Mayor Joseph Chiusolo resigned in June 2016 after serving 19 years in office in the wake of charges that he and his business had benefited from contracts with the township in which Chiusolo had a conflict of interest. As of July 2018, Joseph Cicala was chosen as mayor to succeed Peter Tanella, and Robbie Vargo as Deputy Mayor.

In August 2015, the Township Council selected Michael Maffucci to fill the vacant seat of John Zunic expiring in December 2017, who left office to serve as a New Jersey Superior Court judge.

In the May 2015 municipal election, incumbent Peter Tanella and challenger Harry Kumburis won election to four-year terms on the township council.

=== Federal, state and county representation ===
Cedar Grove is located in the 11th Congressional District and is part of New Jersey's 40th state legislative district. Prior to the 2010 Census, Cedar Grove had been part of the 8th Congressional District, a change made by the New Jersey Redistricting Commission that took effect in January 2013, based on the results of the November 2012 general elections.

For the 119th United States Congress, New Jersey's 11th congressional district is represented by Analilia Mejia (D, Glen Ridge) who was elected in a 2026 special election to serve for the remainder of the Congress following the resignation Mikie Sherrill (D, Montclair), who was elected Governor of New Jersey in 2025. New Jersey is represented in the United States Senate by Democrats Cory Booker (Newark, term ends 2027) and Andy Kim (Moorestown, term ends 2031).

For the 2026–2027 session, the 40th legislative district of the New Jersey Legislature is represented in the State Senate by Kristin Corrado (R, Totowa) and in the General Assembly by Al Barlas (R, Cedar Grove) and Christopher DePhillips (R, Wyckoff).

Essex County is governed by a directly elected county executive, with legislative functions performed by the Board of County Commissioners. As of 2025, the County Executive is Joseph N. DiVincenzo Jr. (D, Roseland), whose four-year term of office ends December 31, 2026. The county's Board of County Commissioners is composed of nine members, five of whom are elected from districts and four of whom are elected on an at-large basis. They are elected for three-year concurrent terms and may be re-elected to successive terms at the annual election in November. Essex County's Commissioners are:

Robert Mercado (D, District 1 – Newark's North and East Wards, parts of Central and West Wards; Newark, 2026), A'Dorian Murray-Thomas (D, District 2 – Irvington, Maplewood and parts of Newark's South and West Wards; Newark, 2026), Vice President Tyshammie L. Cooper (D, District 3 - Newark: West and Central Wards; East Orange, Orange and South Orange; East Orange, 2026), Leonard M. Luciano (D, District 4 – Caldwell, Cedar Grove, Essex Fells, Fairfield, Livingston, Millburn, North Caldwell, Roseland, Verona, West Caldwell and West Orange; West Caldwell, 2026), President Carlos M. Pomares (D, District 5 – Belleville, Bloomfield, Glen Ridge, Montclair and Nutley; Bloomfield, 2026), Brendan W. Gill (D, at large; Montclair, 2026), Romaine Graham (D, at large; Irvington, 2026), Wayne Richardson (D, at large; Newark, 2026), Patricia Sebold (D, at-large; Livingston, 2026).

Constitutional officers elected countywide are: Clerk Christopher J. Durkin (D, West Caldwell, 2025), Register of Deeds Juan M. Rivera Jr. (D, Newark, 2029), Sheriff Amir Jones (D, Newark, 2027), and Surrogate Alturrick Kenney (D, Newark, 2028).

=== Politics ===
As of March 2011, there were a total of 8,672 registered voters in Cedar Grove, of which 2,269 (26.2%) were registered as Democrats, 2,215 (25.5%) were registered as Republicans and 4,184 (48.2%) were registered as Unaffiliated. There were 4 voters registered as Libertarians or Greens.

United States presidential election results for Cedar Grove
Year	Republican		Democratic		Third party(ies)	
Year	No.	%	No.	%	No.	%
2024	4,483	55.37%	3,483	43.02%	130	1.61%
2020	4,350	52.93%	3,788	46.09%	80	0.97%
2016	3,785	56.69%	2,745	41.11%	147	2.20%
2012	3,541	56.93%	2,621	42.14%	58	0.93%
2008	4,013	59.58%	2,680	39.79%	43	0.64%
2004	3,817	60.00%	2,479	38.97%	66	1.04%

In the 2012 presidential election, Republican Mitt Romney received 56.9% of the vote (3,541 cast), ahead of Democrat Barack Obama with 42.1% (2,621 votes), and other candidates with 0.9% (58 votes), among the 6,271 ballots cast by the township's 8,965 registered voters (51 ballots were spoiled), for a turnout of 69.9%. In the 2008 presidential election, Republican John McCain received 59.2% of the vote (4,013 cast), ahead of Democrat Barack Obama with 39.5% (2,680 votes) and other candidates with 0.6% (43 votes), among the 6,780 ballots cast by the township's 8,695 registered voters, for a turnout of 78.0%. In the 2004 presidential election, Republican George W. Bush received 59.8% of the vote (3,817 ballots cast), outpolling Democrat John Kerry with 38.9% (2,479 votes) and other candidates with 0.8% (66 votes), among the 6,378 ballots cast by the township's 8,215 registered voters, for a turnout percentage of 77.6.

Gubernatorial election results for Cedar Grove
Year	Republican		Democratic		Third party(ies)	
Year	No.	%	No.	%	No.	%
2025	3,528	52.91%	3,116	46.73%	24	0.36%
2021	3,170	57.39%	2,329	42.16%	25	0.45%
2017	1,546	48.89%	1,513	47.85%	103	3.26%
2013	2,589	67.07%	1,238	32.07%	33	0.85%
2009	2,699	58.79%	1,524	33.20%	368	8.02%
2005	2,256	54.88%	1,741	42.35%	114	2.77%

In the 2013 gubernatorial election, Republican Chris Christie received 67.1% of the vote (2,589 cast), ahead of Democrat Barbara Buono with 32.1% (1,238 votes), and other candidates with 0.9% (33 votes), among the 3,914 ballots cast by the township's 8,963 registered voters (54 ballots were spoiled), for a turnout of 43.7%. In the 2009 gubernatorial election, Republican Chris Christie received 58.3% of the vote (2,699 ballots cast), ahead of Democrat Jon Corzine with 32.9% (1,524 votes), Independent Chris Daggett with 7.0% (323 votes) and other candidates with 1.0% (45 votes), among the 4,628 ballots cast by the township's 8,644 registered voters, yielding a 53.5% turnout.

United States Senate election results for Cedar Grove1
Year	Republican		Democratic		Third party(ies)	
Year	No.	%	No.	%	No.	%
2024	4,189	53.64%	3,474	44.48%	147	1.88%
2018	2,742	56.26%	1,995	40.93%	137	2.81%
2012	2,871	52.65%	2,458	45.08%	124	2.27%
2006	2,330	56.94%	1,700	41.54%	62	1.52%

United States Senate election results for Cedar Grove2
Year	Republican		Democratic		Third party(ies)	
Year	No.	%	No.	%	No.	%
2020	4,130	52.54%	3,663	46.60%	67	0.85%
2014	1,671	54.68%	1,339	43.82%	46	1.51%
2013	1,428	56.80%	1,069	42.52%	17	0.68%
2008	3,260	55.91%	2,487	42.65%	84	1.44%

== Education ==
=== Public schools ===
The Cedar Grove Schools serve public school students from pre-kindergarten through twelfth grade. As of the 2019–20 school year, the district, comprised of four schools, had an enrollment of 1,613 students and 148.2 classroom teachers (on an FTE basis), for a student–teacher ratio of 10.9:1. Schools in the district (with 2019–20 enrollment data from the National Center for Education Statistics) are North End Elementary School with 258 students in grades Pre-K–4, South End Elementary School with 327 students in grades Pre-K–4, Cedar Grove Memorial Middle School with 500 students in grades 5–8, and Cedar Grove High School with 496 students in grades 9–12. In September 2021, North End School was one of nine schools in New Jersey recognized by the National Blue Ribbon Schools Program.

=== Private schools ===
Washington Academy is an approved private school for special education. Founded in 1982, the academy provides specialized academic and behavioral services to students whose disabilities disrupt their academic and behavioral growth and progress. It serves students ages 3–21 (Pre-K–12th Grade). Washington Academy is a member of the National Association of Private Special Education Centers (NAPSEC), a non-profit organization dedicated to serving the needs of private special education schools. The school is located in the former Leonard R. Parks Elementary School on Route 23.

St. Catherine of Siena School, founded in 1958, is located on Bradford Avenue and operates under the supervision of the Roman Catholic Archdiocese of Newark.

== Transportation ==
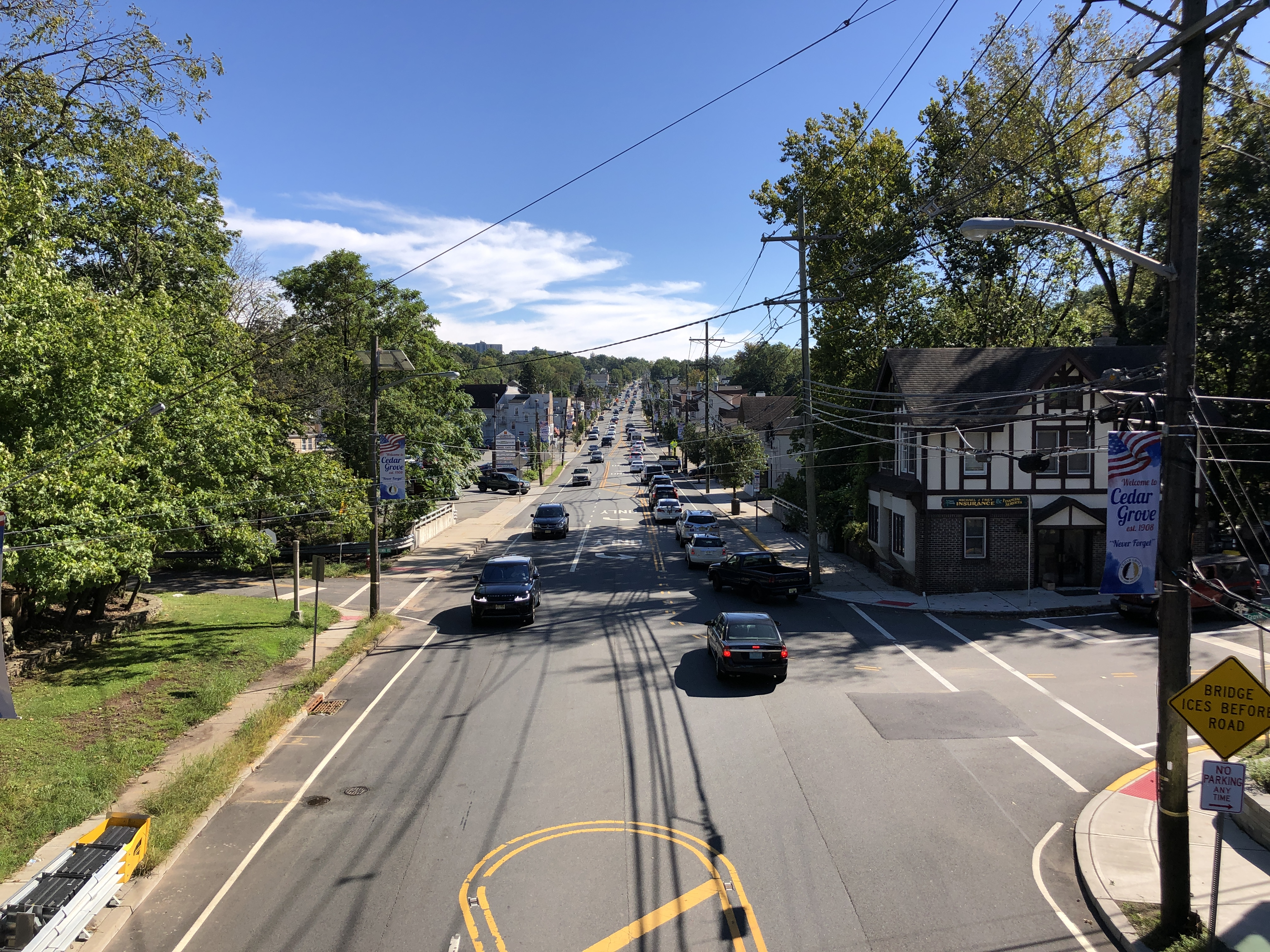
Route 23 in Cedar Grove

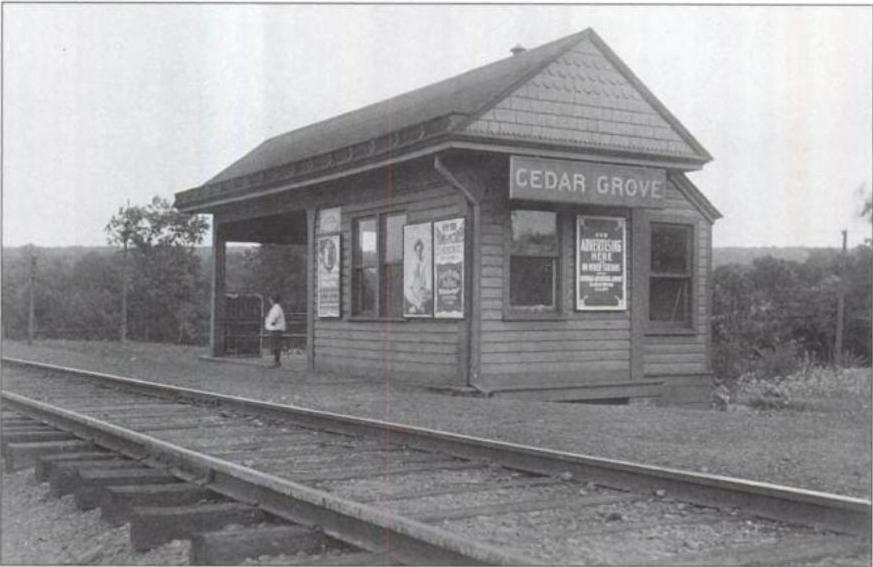
Cedar Grove station on the Caldwell Branch of the Erie Railroad in 1909

=== Roads and highways ===
As of May 2010, the township had a total of 47.09 miles (75.78 km) of roadways, of which 34.59 miles (55.67 km) were maintained by the municipality, 9.22 miles (14.84 km) by Essex County and 3.28 miles (5.28 km) by the New Jersey Department of Transportation.

Route 23 bisects Cedar Grove, making the township accessible via major highways including Interstate 80, Interstate 280, U.S. Route 46, Route 3, and the Garden State Parkway. Cedar Grove is also centrally located to New York City, Newark, Paterson, and Morristown.

=== Public transportation ===
Cedar Grove is served by NJ Transit bus service. The 11 bus line provides service to Newark. The 195 bus line provides transportation to the Port Authority Bus Terminal in Midtown Manhattan. In September 2012, as part of budget cuts, NJ Transit suspended service to Newark on the 75 line.

Commuter train stations are located in the neighboring communities of Little Falls and Montclair. The Erie Railroad's Caldwell Branch ran between Little Falls and West Caldwell, but trains were sparsely scheduled and the line was destroyed in the 1970s.

== Local media ==
=== Newspapers ===
The Verona-Cedar Grove Times, a weekly newspaper that publishes every Thursday, serves Cedar Grove and Verona.

The Cedar Grove Observer, which publishes 50 weeks a year, serves Cedar Grove.

=== Internet ===
Local news is covered by the Cedar Grove Observer and the Verona-Cedar Grove Times.

== Notable people ==
People who were born in, residents of, or otherwise closely associated with Cedar Grove include:

- Ralph L. Brinster (born 1932), genetic research pioneer and National Medal of Science recipient
- Mark Burstein (born c. 1961), former president of Lawrence University
- Jack Cafferty (born 1942), CNN commentator and host
- Tommy DeVito, NFL quarterback
- Bob Diaco (born 1973), head coach of the UConn Huskies football team
- Gary Dickinson (1938–2000), executive at General Motors
- Allen B. DuMont (1901–1965), scientist and inventor best known for improvements to the cathode-ray tube in 1931 for use in TV receivers, manufacture of the first commercially successful electronic TVs and founder of the first licensed TV network, DuMont Television Network
- Amanda Freitag (born 1972), celebrity chef
- Eli Gottlieb (born 1956), novelist and author of The Boy Who Went Away
- Tommy James (born 1947), musician, singer/songwriter and record producer, best known as leader of the 1960s rock band Tommy James and the Shondells
- Ellen Kuras (born 1959), cinematographer whose body of work includes narrative and documentary films, music videos and commercials
- Jonathan Lebed (born 1984), huckster who used internet technology to hype stocks
- Amanda Lepore (born 1967), transgender performance artist and entertainer who has received attention for her modeling, fashion, partying, and business skills
- Marty Liquori (born 1949), competed in the 1968 Summer Olympics in Track and Field. Ranked #5 on the Sports Illustrated list of The 50 Greatest New Jersey Sports Figures
- Tom Lutz (born 1953), writer and literary critic who is founder and editor-in-chief of the Los Angeles Review of Books
- C. Edward McVaney (born 1940), co-founder of JD Edwards
- Michael P. Moran (1944–2004), actor and playwright
- David Njoku (born 1996), tight end drafted 29th in the first round of the 2017 NFL draft by the Cleveland Browns
- Kevin J. O'Toole (born 1964), chair of the Port Authority of New York and New Jersey who had served in the New Jersey Senate and three years as mayor of Cedar Grove
- Todd Pettengill (born 1966), former co-host to the WPLJ morning show "the Big Show"
- Emilie Poulsson (1853–1939), children's author and campaigner for early childhood education
- Aaron Rodgers (born 1983), quarterback
- Ron San Fillipo (1942–2024), athletic director and athletics coach
- C. Robert Sarcone (1925–2020), politician who served in both houses of the New Jersey Legislature
- Michael Uslan (born 1951), originator and Executive Producer of the Batman movies and the first professor to teach "Comic Book Folklore" at an accredited university
- Arthur Wynne (1862–1945), inventor of the crossword puzzle
