= Hilltop Reservation =

Coordinates: 40.81933°N 74.23564°W

The Hilltop Reservation is a nature preserve located in Essex County, New Jersey, in the host communities of Caldwell, Cedar Grove, North Caldwell and Verona. It has over 200 acres (0.81 km^{2}), and is the most recent addition to the Essex County Park System. It is composed of lands formerly occupied by the Essex Mountain Sanatorium, a hospital center originally constructed in the early 1900s to treat tuberculosis patients.

Hilltop Reservation is located on the Second Watchung Mountain, one of three Watchung Mountains which are long, low ridges of volcanic origin in northern New Jersey.

== History ==
The land was designated a Conservation Easement in 2001 by the New Jersey Department of Environmental Protection, permanently dedicating it for conservation and passive recreation purposes, and thereby protecting it from any future development.

In 2003, additional area was dedicated, bringing the Reservation's total to 284.16 acres (1.1500 km^{2}). This addition to the county's official New Jersey Green Acres Recreation and Open Space Inventory brings the current total area of the Essex County Park System to 6,010.52 acres (24.3237 km^{2}).

== Hilltop Conservancy ==
The Hilltop Conservancy is a local group dedicated to the preservation of this area.
