= Jonathan Lebed =

American businessman

- Born: September 29, 1984 (age 41)
- Occupations: Owner, Lebed Biz LLC

Jonathan G. Lebed (born September 29, 1984) is an American businessman and former stock trader who reached an out-of-court civil settlement with the U.S. Securities and Exchange Commission (SEC) at age 15 for stock manipulation.

== Early life and education ==
Lebed was raised in Cedar Grove, New Jersey, and graduated from Cedar Grove High School.

== Career ==
Between September 1999 and February 2000, Lebed made hundreds of thousands of dollars from a computer in his bedroom in Cedar Grove, New Jersey, using pump and dump by posting in internet chat rooms and message boards, encouraging people to buy penny stocks he already owned, thus, according to the SEC, artificially raising the price of the stock. Between September 1999 and February 2000, his smallest one-day gain was US$12,000, while his biggest was $74,000. Lebed became the first minor prosecuted by the SEC. In 2001, Lebed and the SEC negotiated an out-of-court settlement in which Lebed forfeited $285,000 in profit and interest he had made on 11 trades without admitting any wrongdoing, allowing him to keep close to half a million dollars.

In 2003, Lebed was an unsuccessful candidate for the Cedar Grove township council.

Lebed's legal issues were profiled in an episode of the 2001 BBC documentary The Future Just Happened.

In 2010, he was living in Wayne, New Jersey, and was the sole owner of Lebed Biz LLC, which runs a website touting penny stocks. In 2008, a company won a $2.56 million judgment against Lebed.
