= David Njoku =

American football player (born 1996)

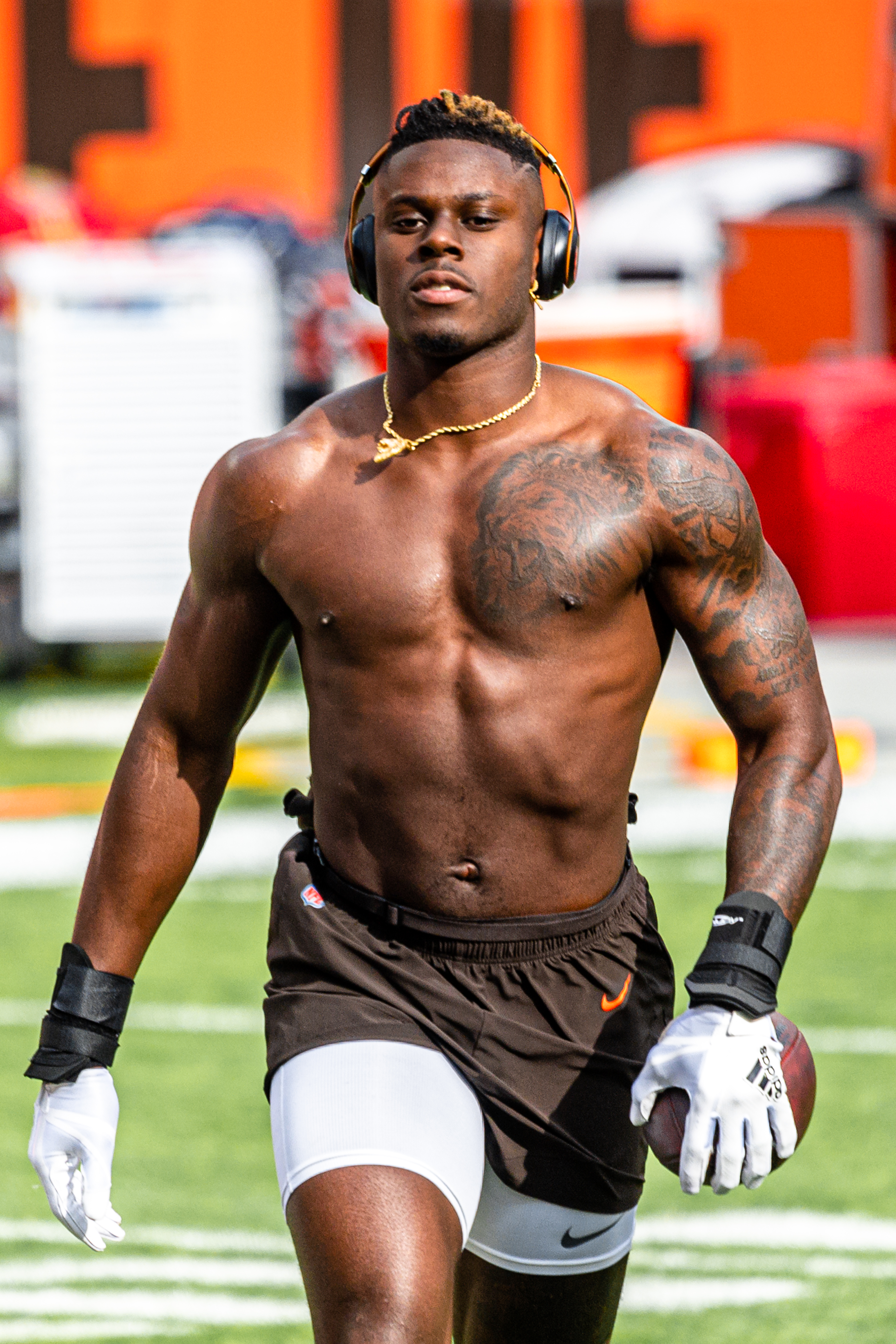
- Njoku with the Cleveland Browns in 2021

No. 83 – Los Angeles Chargers
- Position: Tight end
- Roster status: Active

Personal information
- Born: July 10, 1996 (age 30); Cedar Grove, New Jersey, U.S.
- Listed height: 6 ft 4 in (1.93 m)
- Listed weight: 246 lb (112 kg)

Career information
- High school: Cedar Grove
- College: Miami (FL) (2014–2016)
- NFL draft: 2017: 1st round, 29th overall pick

Career history
- Cleveland Browns (2017–2025); Los Angeles Chargers (2026–present)

Awards and highlights
- Pro Bowl (2023)

Career NFL statistics as of 2026
- Receptions: 390
- Receiving yards: 4,129
- Receiving touchdowns: 34
- Stats at Pro Football Reference

David Njoku (/nəˈdʒoʊku/ nuh-JOH-koo; born July 10, 1996) is an American professional football tight end for the Los Angeles Chargers of the National Football League (NFL). He played college football for the Miami Hurricanes and was selected by the Cleveland Browns in the first round of the 2017 NFL draft.

== Early life ==
Njoku is one of ten children born to Nigerian parents of Igbo heritage who immigrated to the United States. He attended Cedar Grove High School in Cedar Grove, New Jersey. During his career, he had 76 receptions for 1,794 yards and 19 touchdowns. A 3-star tight end recruit, Njoku committed to Miami (FL) to play college football over offers from Boston College, Ohio State, and Temple. Njoku also competed in the high jump in high school, winning the national championship at the New Balance Nationals Outdoor his senior year in 2014.

== College career ==
After redshirting his first year at Miami in 2014, Njoku played in all 13 games with four starts in 2015 and had 21 receptions for 362 yards and one touchdown. In 2016, he had 43 receptions for 698 yards and eight touchdowns. After the season, Njoku decided to forgo his remaining two years of eligibility and enter the 2017 NFL draft.

== Professional career ==
=== Pre-draft ===
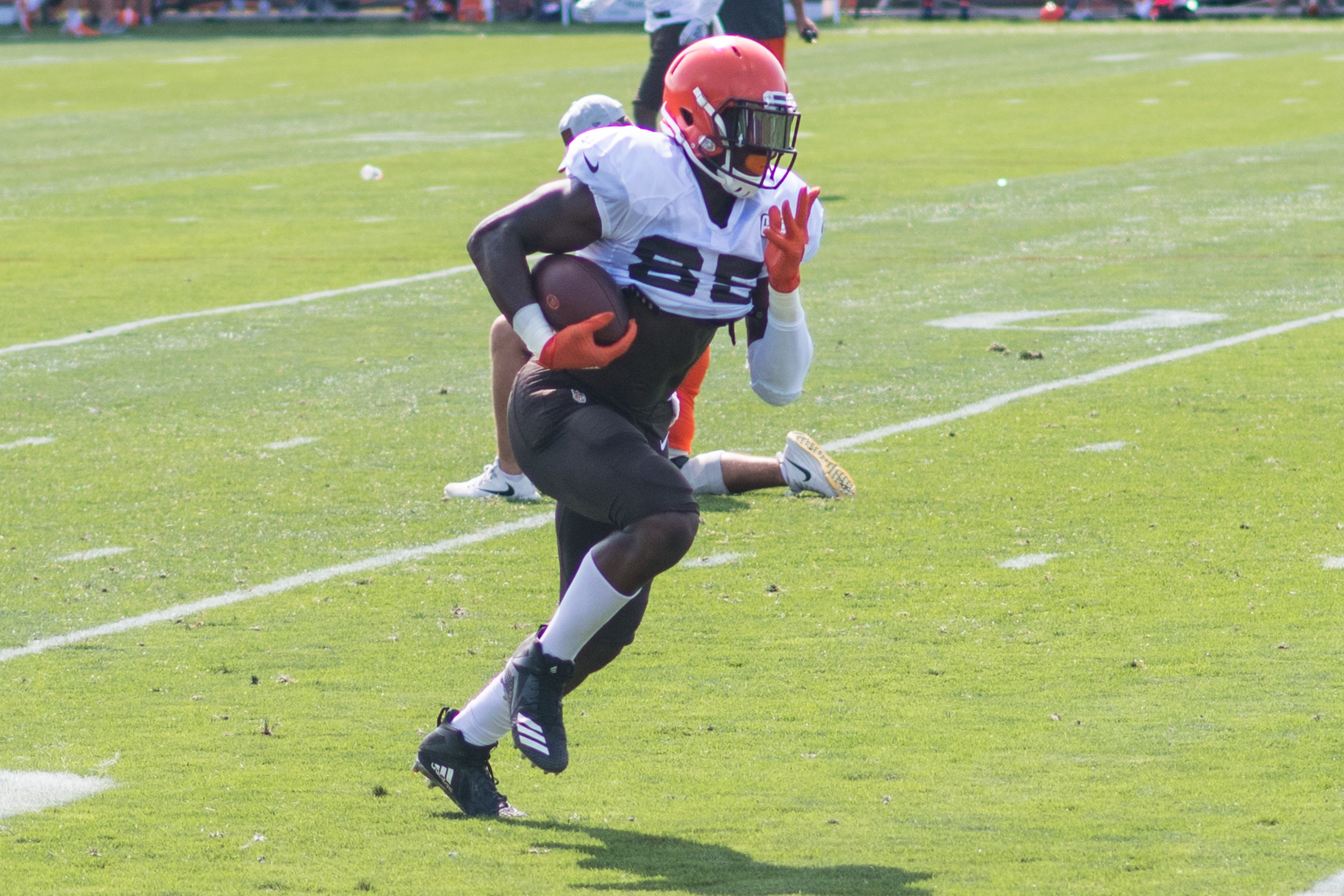
Njoku with the Cleveland Browns, 2018

Njoku received an invitation to the NFL Combine and completed all of the combine and positional drills. In addition, he attended Miami's Pro Day and opted to again perform the vertical jump, broad jump, short shuttle, 40-yard dash, 20-yard dash, and 10-yard dash. NFL draft experts and analysts projected Njoku to be selected in the first round of the draft. He was ranked the third best tight end available in the draft by Sports Illustrated and was ranked the second best tight end by ESPN, NFL analyst Mike Mayock, and NFL analyst Bucky Brooks.

Pre-draft measurables
Height	Weight	Arm length	Hand span	Wingspan	40-yard dash	10-yard split	20-yard split	20-yard shuttle	Three-cone drill	Vertical jump	Broad jump	Bench press	Wonderlic
6 ft 4 in (1.93 m)	246 lb (112 kg)	35 1/4 in (0.90 m)	10 in (0.25 m)	6 ft 10 1/2 in (2.10 m)	4.63 s	1.57 s	2.66 s	4.34 s	6.97 s	40.0 in (1.02 m)	11 ft 1 in (3.38 m)	21 reps	24
All value from NFL Scouting Combine/Pro Day

=== Cleveland Browns ===
==== 2017 season ====
The Cleveland Browns selected Njoku in the first round (29th overall) of the 2017 NFL draft. He was the third tight end to be selected in the draft. On June 15, 2017, the Browns signed Njoku to a fully guaranteed, four-year, $9.52 million contract which included a signing bonus of $5.06 million.

On September 10, Njoku made his NFL debut in a 21–18 loss to the Pittsburgh Steelers. He had two receptions for 20 yards. in the Week 2 game against the Baltimore Ravens, he had three receptions for 27 yards and his first NFL touchdown in the 24–10 loss. He finished his rookie year with 32 catches for 386 yards and four touchdowns.

==== 2018 season ====
In 2018, Njoku entered the season as the Browns starting tight end. He played in all 16 games with 14 starts, recording 56 catches for 639 yards and four touchdowns.

==== 2019 season ====
Njoku had a receiving touchdown in the Browns' 2019 season opener against the Tennessee Titans. In Week 2, Njoku was upended and landed on his head and left the game against the New York Jets due to a concussion. However, later in the week, it was revealed that Njoku suffered a broken wrist on the same play. He was placed on injured reserve on September 20, 2019. He was designated for return from injured reserve on November 20, 2019, and began practicing with the team again. He was activated on December 7, 2019. He appeared in four games and started one in the 2019 season.

==== 2020 season ====
On April 27, 2020, the Browns exercised the fifth-year option on Njoku's contract. Njoku was placed on injured reserve on September 14, 2020, with a knee injury, a day after he posted three catches for 50 yards and a touchdown against the Ravens. He was activated on October 10.

In the 2020 season, Njoku appeared in 13 games and started five. He finished with 19 receptions for 213 receiving yards and two receiving touchdowns.

==== 2021 season ====
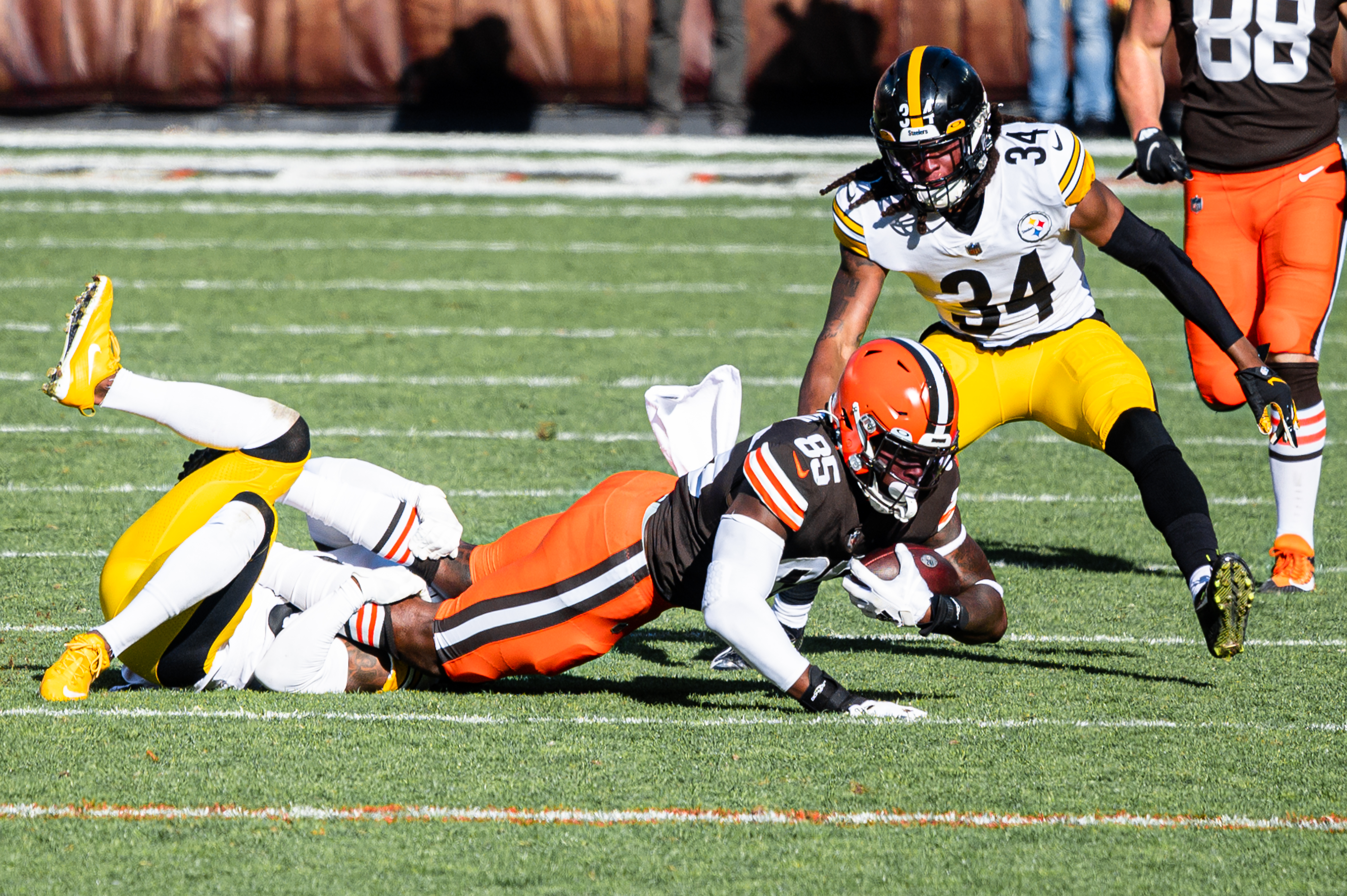
Njoku playing against the Pittsburgh Steelers in 2021.

In Week 5 against the Los Angeles Chargers, Njoku caught seven passes for 149 yards and a touchdown, with the score coming off a 71-yard catch and run, in the 47–42 loss. In the 2021 season, he appeared in all 16 games and started 11. He finished with 36 receptions for 475 receiving yards and four receiving touchdowns.

==== 2022 season ====
The Browns placed the franchise tag on Njoku on March 7, 2022. On May 27, Njoku signed a four-year, $56.75 million contract extension. In Week 7 against the Baltimore Ravens, Njoku suffered a high–ankle sprain. It was later announced that he would not require surgery but would miss two–to–five weeks. In the 2022 season, Njoku recorded 58 receptions for 628 receiving yards and four receiving touchdowns in 14 games and starts.

==== 2023 season ====
On September 30, 2023, before Week 4, the Browns announced that Njoku was questionable due to suffering burns on his face and arms in a "freak accident" in his home. In Week 14 against the Jacksonville Jaguars, he had two receiving touchdowns in the 31–27 victory for his first game with multiple touchdowns. Njoku was later selected to his first Pro Bowl appearance.

==== 2024 season ====
In 2024, Njoku played in 11 games, catching 64 receptions for 505 yards and 5 touchdowns. Njoku suffered a knee injury in Week 14, that sidelined him for the remainder of the season. Njoku also missed the first 3 games after an injury to his ankle in Week 1.

==== 2025 season ====
In the 2025 season, Njoku finished the year with 33 receptions, 293 yards and 4 touchdowns, his fewest since the 2021 season. Njoku dealt with knee injuries most of the season, which sidelines him in Week 7, and sidelined him for the rest of the season in Week 14. On February 9, 2026, Njoku announced on his social media that he would not be returning for the Browns for the 2026 NFL season.

=== Los Angeles Chargers ===
==== 2026 season ====
On May 11, 2026, Njoku agreed to terms on a one-year contract with the Los Angeles Chargers. On September 21, Njoku was placed on injured reserve due to a fibula injury suffered in the team's Week 2 loss to the Las Vegas Raiders.

== Career statistics ==
Legend
**Bold**	Career high

=== NFL ===
==== Regular season ====
Year	Team	Games		Receiving					Fumbles	
Year	Team	GP	GS	Rec	Yds	Avg	Lng	TD	Fum	Lost
2017	CLE	16	5	32	386	12.1	34	4	0	0
2018	CLE	16	14	56	639	11.4	66	4	0	0
2019	CLE	4	1	5	41	8.2	18	1	0	0
2020	CLE	13	5	19	213	11.2	28	2	0	0
2021	CLE	16	11	36	475	**13.2**	**71**	4	0	0
2022	CLE	14	14	58	628	10.8	38	4	1	1
2023	CLE	16	16	**81**	**882**	10.9	43	**6**	**2**	**2**
2024	CLE	11	11	64	505	7.9	29	5	0	0
2025	CLE	12	11	33	293	8.9	23	4	0	0
2026	LAC	2	0	6	67	11.2	15	0	0	0
Career		120	88	390	4,129	10.6	71	34	3	3

==== Postseason ====
Year	Team	Games		Receiving					Fumbles	
Year	Team	GP	GS	Rec	Yds	Avg	Lng	TD	Fum	Lost
2020	CLE	2	1	5	66	13.2	27	0	0	0
2023	CLE	1	1	**7**	**93**	**13.3**	**45**	0	0	0
Career		3	2	12	159	13.3	45	0	0	0

=== College ===
Season	Team	GP	Receiving		
Season	Team	GP	Rec	Yds	TD
2014	Miami	Redshirt			
2015	Miami	13	21	362	1
2016	Miami	12	**43**	**698**	**8**
Total		25	64	1,060	9

== Personal life ==
On September 29, 2023, Njoku suffered burns to his face and arms during a household accident where he was trying to light a fire pit. He has since supported the American Burn Association in multiple instances. He was named a Nigerian chief in his familial village, Umuozu, in Ugiri Isiala Mbano, Imo State in the 2022 offseason.
