= Essex County Park Commission Administration Building =

- U.S. National Register of Historic Places
- New Jersey Register of Historic Places
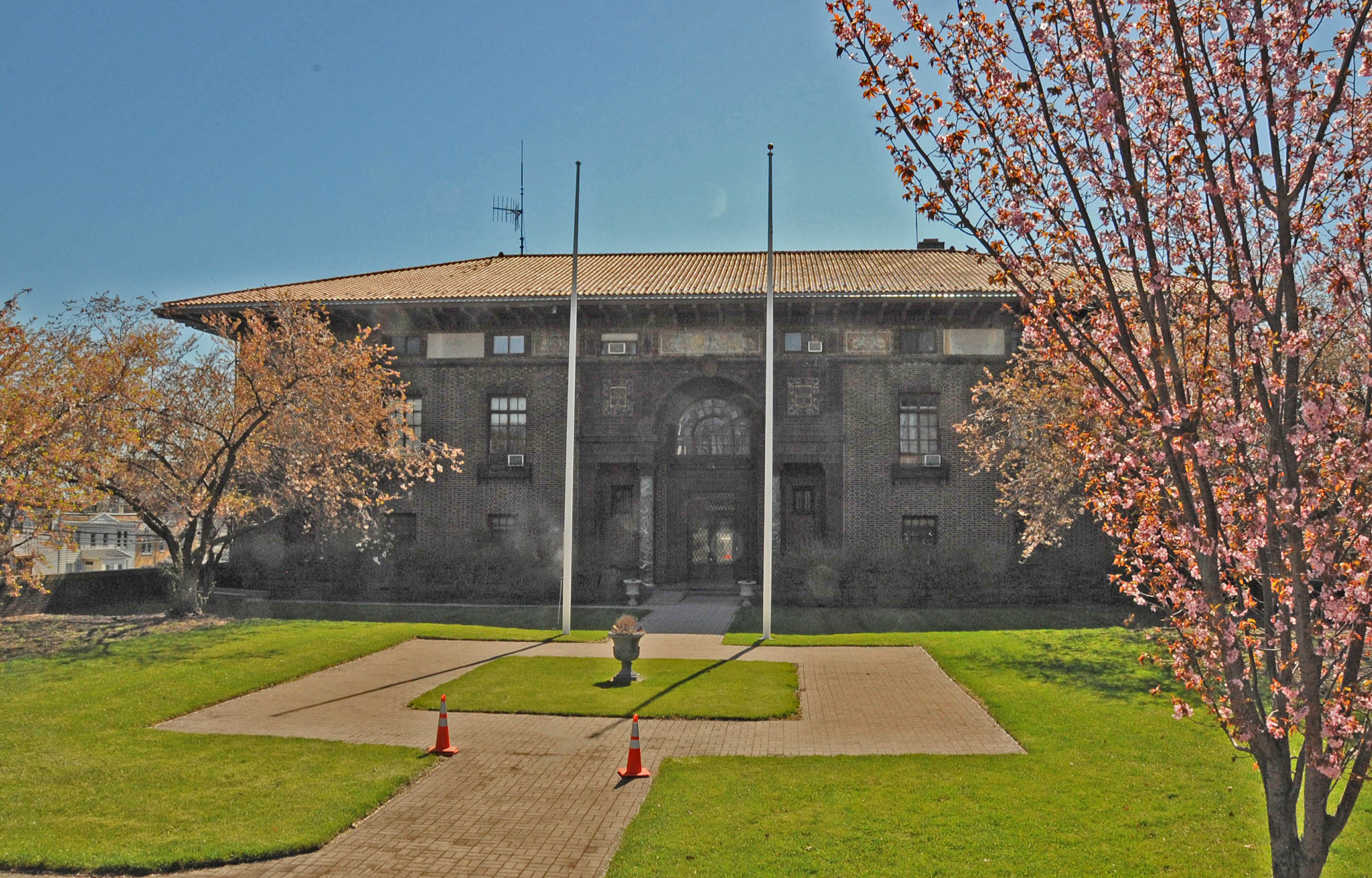

- Location within Essex County, New Jersey Location within New Jersey Location within the United States
- Location: 115 Clifton Avenue, Newark, New Jersey
- Coordinates: 40°45′12″N 74°10′41″W
- Area: 0.5 acres (0.20 ha)
- Built: 1894
- Architects: Magonicle, H. Van Buren
- Architectural style: Renaissance
- NRHP reference No.: 77000864
- NJRHP No.: 1248

Significant dates
- Added to NRHP: November 11, 1977
- Designated NJRHP: May 27, 1977

The Essex County Park Commission Administration Building is located in Newark, Essex County, New Jersey, United States. The building was built in 1916 and was added to the National Register of Historic Places on November 11, 1977.

== See also ==
- National Register of Historic Places listings in Essex County, New Jersey
- Essex County Park System, New Jersey
