= Cedar Grove High School (New Jersey) =

High school in Essex County, New Jersey, US

Location
- 90 Rugby Road; Cedar Grove, Essex County, New Jersey 07009; United States
- 40.850317°N 74.223291°W

Information
- Type: Public high school
- Established: September 1961
- School district: Cedar Grove Schools
- NCES School ID: 340285002026
- Principal: Jody Inglis
- Faculty: 43.0 FTEs
- Grades: 9-12
- Enrollment: 421 (as of 2024–25)
- Student to teacher ratio: 9.8:1
- Colors: Black and Gold
- Athletics conference: Super Essex Conference (general); North Jersey Super Football Conference (football)
- Team name: Panthers
- Accreditation: Middle States Association of Colleges and Schools
- Website: www.cgschools.org/o/cghs

Cedar Grove High School is a four-year comprehensive public high school that serves students in ninth through twelfth grades from the Cedar Grove, in Essex County, in the U.S. state of New Jersey, operating as the lone secondary school of the Cedar Grove Schools. "Committed to Excellence" is the school's motto. The school has been accredited by the Middle States Association of Colleges and Schools Commission on Elementary and Secondary Schools since 1968; The school's accreditation status was extended for seven years in Fall 2018.

As of the 2024–25 school year, the school had an enrollment of 421 students and 43.0 classroom teachers (on an FTE basis), for a student–teacher ratio of 9.8:1. There were 25 students (5.9% of enrollment) eligible for free lunch and 2 (0.5% of students) eligible for reduced-cost lunch.

== History ==
After the district ended a high school program in 1917, students were sent to Bloomfield High School and later were sent to Passaic Valley Regional High School. A new Cedar Grove Memorial High School program was temporarily housed at Memorial School and opened in September 1961 with 331 students in grades 9 and 10. The new Cedar Grove Memorial High School building, constructed at a cost of $1.5 million (equivalent to $16 million in 2025) opened in September 1962. The first graduating class coming at the conclusion of the 1963–64 school year. As part of an effort to avoid mix-ups with other schools named Memorial High School, the name of the high school was changed to Cedar Grove High School at the start of the 1988–89 school year.

== Awards, recognition and rankings ==
The school was the 103rd-ranked public high school in New Jersey out of 339 schools statewide in New Jersey Monthly magazine's September 2014 cover story on the state's "Top Public High Schools", using a new ranking methodology. The school had been ranked 74th in the state of 328 schools in 2012, after being ranked 103rd in 2010 out of 322 schools listed. The magazine ranked the school 70th in 2008 out of 316 schools. The school was ranked 55th in the magazine's September 2006 issue, which included 316 schools across the state. Schooldigger.com ranked the school 171st out of 381 public high schools statewide in its 2011 rankings (a decrease of 79 positions from the 2010 ranking) which were based on the combined percentage of students classified as proficient or above proficient on the mathematics (78.9%) and language arts literacy (95.2%) components of the High School Proficiency Assessment (HSPA).

== Extracurricular activities ==
=== Choir/Band ===
The Cedar Grove High School choirs (Select Choir and Concert Choir) and band are led and conducted by Jennifer Jessen-Foose. Choir members audition for prestigious choirs such as the NJ Region I Chorus or NJ All State Choir (NJMEA), or National American Honor Choir (NAfME) and many succeed in being accepted. The choir annually competes in choral competitions. The choir and band annually perform in various locations such as Europe. Annually, the Choir and Band hold 3 or 4 concerts: Winter, Spring, Musical (in Concert). The Cedar Grove High School's choirs and band have won many awards in previous years. The Cedar Grove High School's choir and band are committed to excellence.

=== Orchestra ===
The Cedar Grove High School Orchestra was formed in 1968. The current Conductor is Robert Savino. The orchestra continues to compete in competitions and play concerts yearly.

There were several years when the orchestra had no director and was completely student directed. This was done by a small group of students which consisted of 3 violins, one cello, one piano, and one bass. They were asked to perform throughout the community in the late 1990s and continued to pursue music despite the school's inability to provide them with an adequate instructor.

=== Athletics ===
The Cedar Grove High School Panthers compete in the Super Essex Conference which is comprised of public and private high schools covering Essex County and operates under the jurisdiction of the New Jersey State Interscholastic Athletic Association (NJSIAA). Prior to the NJSIAA's 2010 realignment, the school had competed in the Colonial Hills Conference, which included schools in Essex, Morris and Somerset counties in central North Jersey. With 374 students in grades 10–12, the school was classified by the NJSIAA for the 2019–20 school year as Group I for most athletic competition purposes, which included schools with an enrollment of 75 to 476 students in that grade range. The football team competes in the National White division of the North Jersey Super Football Conference, which includes 112 schools competing in 20 divisions, making it the nation's biggest football-only high school sports league. The school was classified by the NJSIAA as Group I North for football for 2024–2026, which included schools with 254 to 474 students.

The school participates in a joint ice hockey team with Passaic Valley Regional High School as the host school / lead agency. The co-op program operates under agreements scheduled to expire at the end of the 2023–24 school year.

The boys track team won the Group II spring / outdoor track state championship in 1969 and the Group I title in 1970.

The 1974 baseball team finished the season with a record of 17-5-2 after winning the Group I state championship by defeating Gloucester City High School by a score of 5–4 in the final of the tournament. In 2003, the baseball team took the North II, Group I state title with a 10–7 win over New Providence High School in the tournament's final game.

The softball team has won the Group I state championship in 1977 and 1979 (defeating Hammonton High School in the tournament final both years), 2015 (vs. Henry Hudson Regional High School), 2017 (vs. Metuchen High School) and 2019 (vs. Buena Regional High School); the program's five titles are tied for eighth-most in the state. The 1979 team finished the season 26–0 as the state's only undefeated team after beating Hammonton High School by a score of 6–0 in the Group I championship game. NJ.com / The Star-Ledger ranked Cedar Grove as their number-one softball team in the state in 1979. In 2004, the team defeated Midland Park High School 2–0, to win the North I, Group I championship. The 2006 softball team returned as sectional champion, edging Wallington High School 5–4 in the tournament final. The team won the Group I state title in 2017 against Metuchen High School behind a 13-strikeout perfect game by pitcher Mia Faieta in the final game of the tournament. The team advanced to the inaugural New Jersey State Interscholastic Athletic Association softball Tournament of Champions as the sixth seed, defeating third-seeded Group II champion Robbinsville High School by a score of 2–1 in the first round before failing to the second-seeded eventual champion Immaculate Heart Academy by 3–0 in the semifinal game, on three runs allowed in the game's first inning.

The football team won the NJSIAA North II Group I state sectional championship in 1978 (awarded by NJSIAA), 1983, 2000, 2004, 2007, 2009 and 2011. The 1978 team finished the season with a 7–1 record and was awarded the North II Group I sectional title, without a playoff, as the only team that qualified in that group. The team won the North II Group I title in 2000 with a 12–0 win in the sectional championship game against New Providence High School, a team they had lost to in their previous four post-season head-to-head games since 1983. The football team won the 2004 North II Group I state sectional championship with head coach Ed Sadloch by defeating Hoboken High School by a score of 6–0 in the tournament final. In 2007, the team defeated Belvidere High School 17–0 to win the North II, Group I state sectional championship in a game played at Rutgers Stadium. The win was the team's fifth sectional title, all of which have come without giving up a point, including shutouts in 1983, 2000 and 2004, and the team was declared champion in 1978 as the only team eligible for the playoffs in its section. In 2009, the football team beat Secaucus High School by a score of 30–14 at Giants Stadium to win the North II Group I state sectional title for the fourth time in the decade. The team won their seventh playoff-era sectional title in 2011 with a 34–21 win against Weequahic High School in the championship game.

The wrestling team won the Central Jersey Group III title in 1990 and the North II Group I title in both 2016 and 2017. In 2016 and 2017, the wrestling team upset heavily favored Bound Brook High School in consecutive years to win the North II Group I sectional title.

In 2007, Cedar Grove sophomore Matthew Giacobbe won the state sectional championship in the 3200m run in North I Group I.

The boys' basketball team won the 2008 North I, Group I state sectional title with a 43–34 win over Verona High School. The victory was the team's first sectional title in over three decades.

In 2009, Cedar Grove senior Nick Miller won the Group I state championship in golf and placed top 5 in the Tournament of Champions.

The cheerleading team won the NJCDCA Group I state championship title in 2017.

== Administration ==
The school's principal is Jody Inglis. Her core administration team includes the vice principal.

== Filming location ==
Portions of the 2024 film I Saw the TV Glow were filmed at the high school.

== Notable alumni ==
- Mark Burstein (class of 1979), 16th president of Lawrence University
- Bob Diaco (born 1973), former head coach of the UConn Huskies football team and coiner of the "Civil Conflict" to describe the UConn–UCF rivalry
- Amanda Freitag (born 1972), celebrity chef featured on the Food Network
- Ellen Kuras (born 1959), cinematographer.
- Jonathan Lebed (born 1984), stock trader prosecuted by the SEC at age 15 for stock manipulation
- David Njoku (born 1996), tight end drafted 29th in the first round of the 2017 NFL draft by the Cleveland Browns
- Kevin J. O'Toole (born 1966), former member of the New Jersey Senate who served three terms as mayor of Cedar Grove
