= Henry Alexander Davidson =

American psychiatrist

Director of Essex County Hospital Center
- In office 1957–1969

Personal details
- Born: May 27, 1905 Newark, New Jersey
- Died: August 23, 1973 (aged 68) East Orange, New Jersey

Henry Alexander Davidson (May 27, 1905 – August 23, 1973) was an American physician, a psychiatric administrator, and a proponent of forensic psychiatry.

== Biography ==
Davidson was born on May 27, 1905, in Newark, New Jersey, the son of a physician.

He earned his undergraduate degree at the Columbia University in Manhattan, New York City. He attended the Jefferson Medical College in Philadelphia, Pennsylvania and received his M.D. in 1928. In 1931, he received an M.S. in neuropsychiatry from the University of Pennsylvania. He interned at Beth Israel Medical Center in Newark, New Jersey from 1928 to 1929, and was a resident at the Philadelphia Orthopedic Hospital and Infirmary for Nervous Diseases from 1931 to 1932. He later became a diplomate in psychiatry given by the American Board of Psychiatry and Neurology.

Davidson was in private practice in Newark for about ten years. With the start of World War II, he entered military service in 1941 and served in the South Pacific. He left the military in 1947 with the rank of Major. He entered the civil service at the Veterans Administration in Newark and worked at the central office in Washington, DC from 1950 to 1954. He then became assistant superintendent of the Essex County Overbrook Hospital, a large psychiatric hospital in New Jersey. He became the superintendent and stayed for twelve years. When he left the hospital in 1969, he returned to his private practice, consulting, and lecturing.

Davidson lectured on medical legal matters at the Columbia University and the University of Virginia. He was a president of the New Jersey Psychiatric Association, president of the New Jersey Academy of Medicine, and president of the New Jersey Medico Legal Society. He served as parliamentarian of the American Psychiatric Association (APA) and wrote on parliamentary procedures. He was editor of The Journal of the New Jersey Medical Society for 32 years, and was an editor of the American Journal of Psychiatry.

He died at his home, 276 Prospect Street in East Orange, New Jersey on August 23, 1973, of coronary thrombosis.

== Publications ==
- Davidson, Henry A. "Mental Hygiene and the General Hospital," The Journal of the Medical Society of New Jersey (1941): 173–176.
- Davidson, Henry A. "Orientation to Psychosomatics," Military Surgeon (1947): 47–50.
- Davidson, Henry A. A Short History of Chess. New York: Greenberg [1949].
- Davidson, Henry A. Forensic Psychiatry. New York: Ronald, 1952.
- Davidson, Henry A. Guide to Medical Writing: A Practical Manual for Physicians, Dentists, Nurses, Pharmacists. New York: Ronald Press, 1957.
- Davidson, Henry A. The World of Doctor Whatsisname. Washington: American Psychiatric Association, 1961.
