= Verona Park =

Park in Verona, New Jersey, United States

Verona
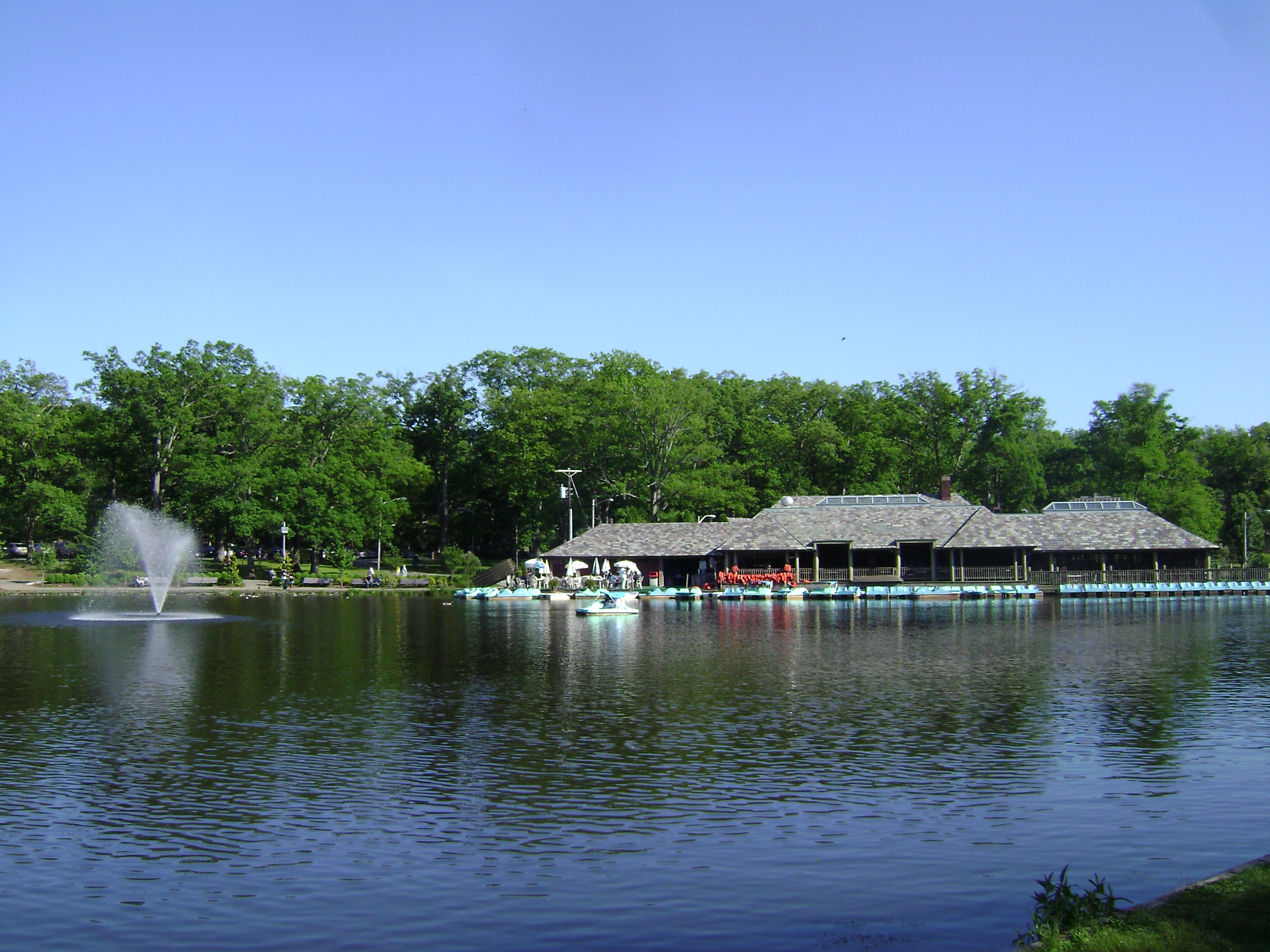
- Verona Park Boathouse
- Interactive map of Verona
- Type: Public park
- Location: Verona, New Jersey
- Coordinates: 40.827853°N 74.245289°W
- Area: 54.32 acres (219,800 m^{2})
- Operator: Essex County
- Status: Open all year.

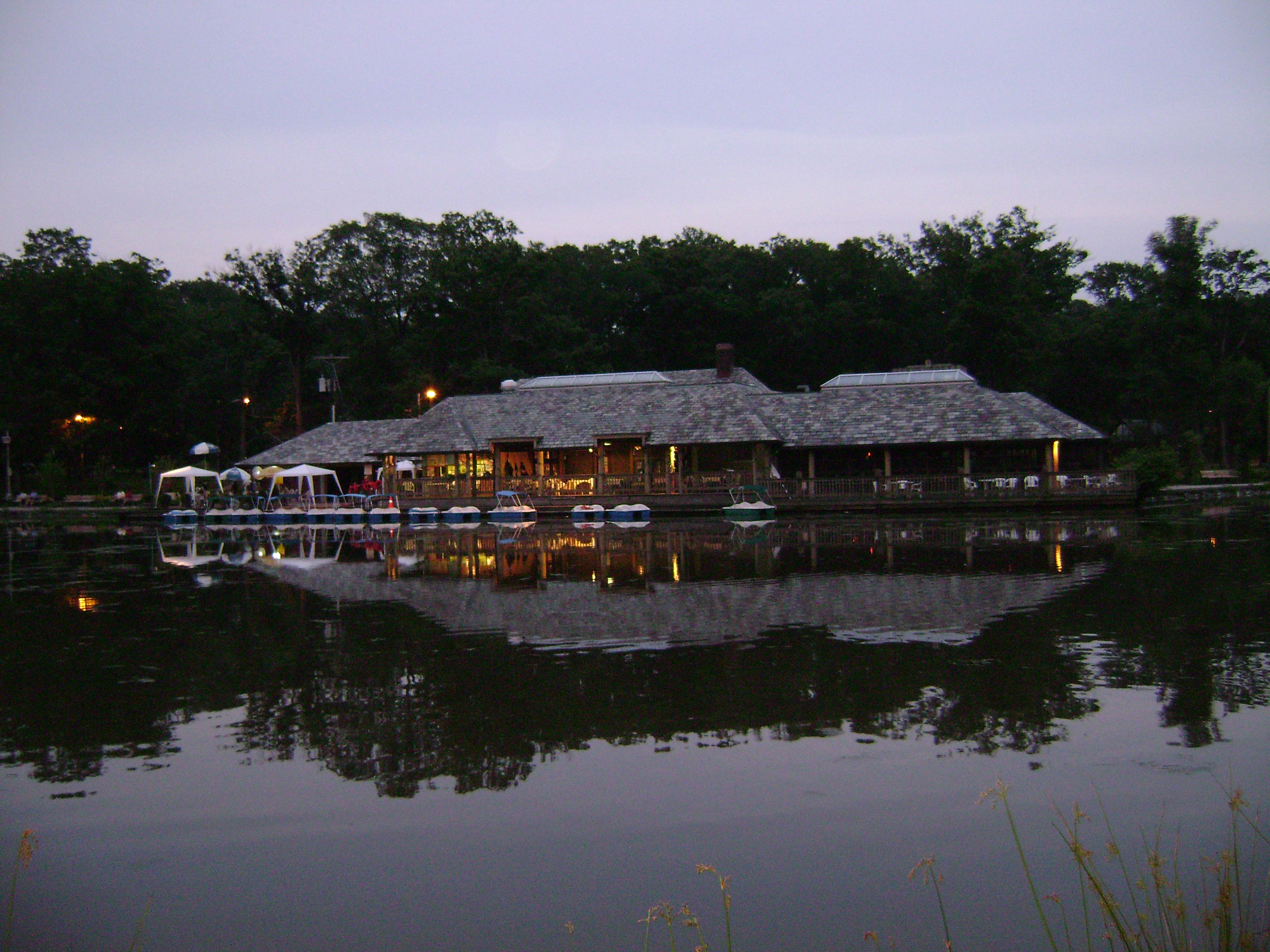
The Verona Park Boathouse at night.

Verona Park is a park located in Verona, as part of the Essex County Park System, New Jersey. It is a 54.32-acre (219,800 m^{2}) park with a lake bordered by Lakeside and Bloomfield Avenues in the southern part of Verona. This is the fifth largest park within the system.

== History ==
Once an old swamp, the lake was first formed in 1814 when Doctor Gone (or Bohn) dammed the Peckman River for a grist mill. Later this lake surrounded by weeping willow trees and winding paths became an ideal location for family activities. Even before it became a county park, the public—including residents outside Verona—flocked there by way of the Bloomfield Avenue trolley, to bathe and picnic and enjoy some commercial amusements.

The first land acquisitions for the park were made in 1920. Public demand for acquisition of this desirable tract had been increasing for some time, but action was delayed due to economic conditions caused by the war. To acquire the part of the land owned by the Erie Railroad Company, an agreement was made allowing the RR to retain a right-of-way across the park by means of a bridge. Sketches showed a bridge with a series of high arches that spanned the lake and roadway. The bridge never materialized. Instead, the existing arched pedestrian bridge over the lake presents a quaint architectural highlight. L The landscape plans prepared by the Olmsted Brothers were approved the same year Verona Park was acquired. Actual development did not start until several years later due to court proceedings concerning condemnation of some of the land. There was no inconvenience to the public during the delay because the park was already being used for boating, bathing, skating, picnics, and band concerts.

== Park features ==
- 13-acre (53,000 m^{2}) lake for boating and fishing
- Boathouse
- Ornamental bridge over the lake, popular for wedding party photographs
- Children's garden
- Tennis courts
- Exercise equipment
- Playground
- 1.2-mile (1.9 km) fitness course
- Bocce courts
- Annual craft show
- Concerts at gazebo in center of park
