= Eagle Rock Reservation =

Natural area in the United States

- IUCN category V (protected landscape/seascape)
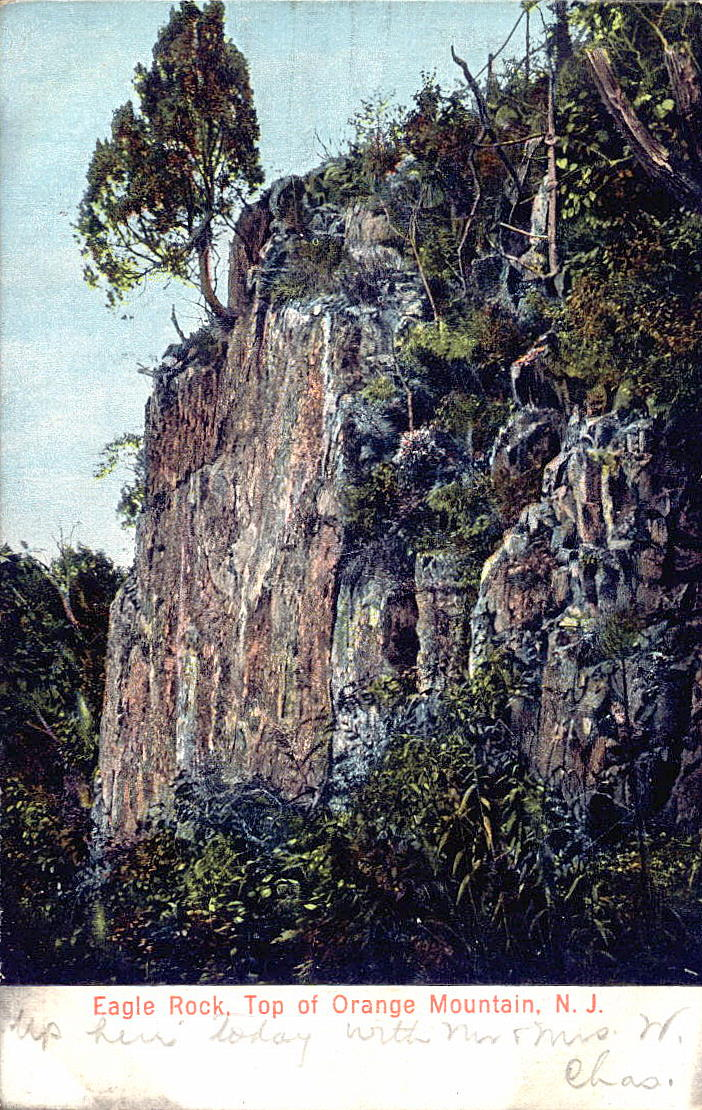
- Eagle Rock, the namesake of the Eagle Rock Reservation, as seen in 1907

- Location within Essex County, New Jersey
- Location: West Orange, Montclair and Verona, New Jersey
- Nearest city: Newark
- Coordinates: 40°48′41″N 74°14′24″W
- Area: 408 acres (165 ha)
- Governing body: Essex County

Eagle Rock Reservation is a 408.33-acre (165.25 ha) forest reserve and recreational park in the First Watchung Mountain of New Jersey (U.S.), located in the communities of West Orange, Montclair, and Verona. The land is owned and administered by the Essex County Department of Parks, Recreation and Cultural Affairs.

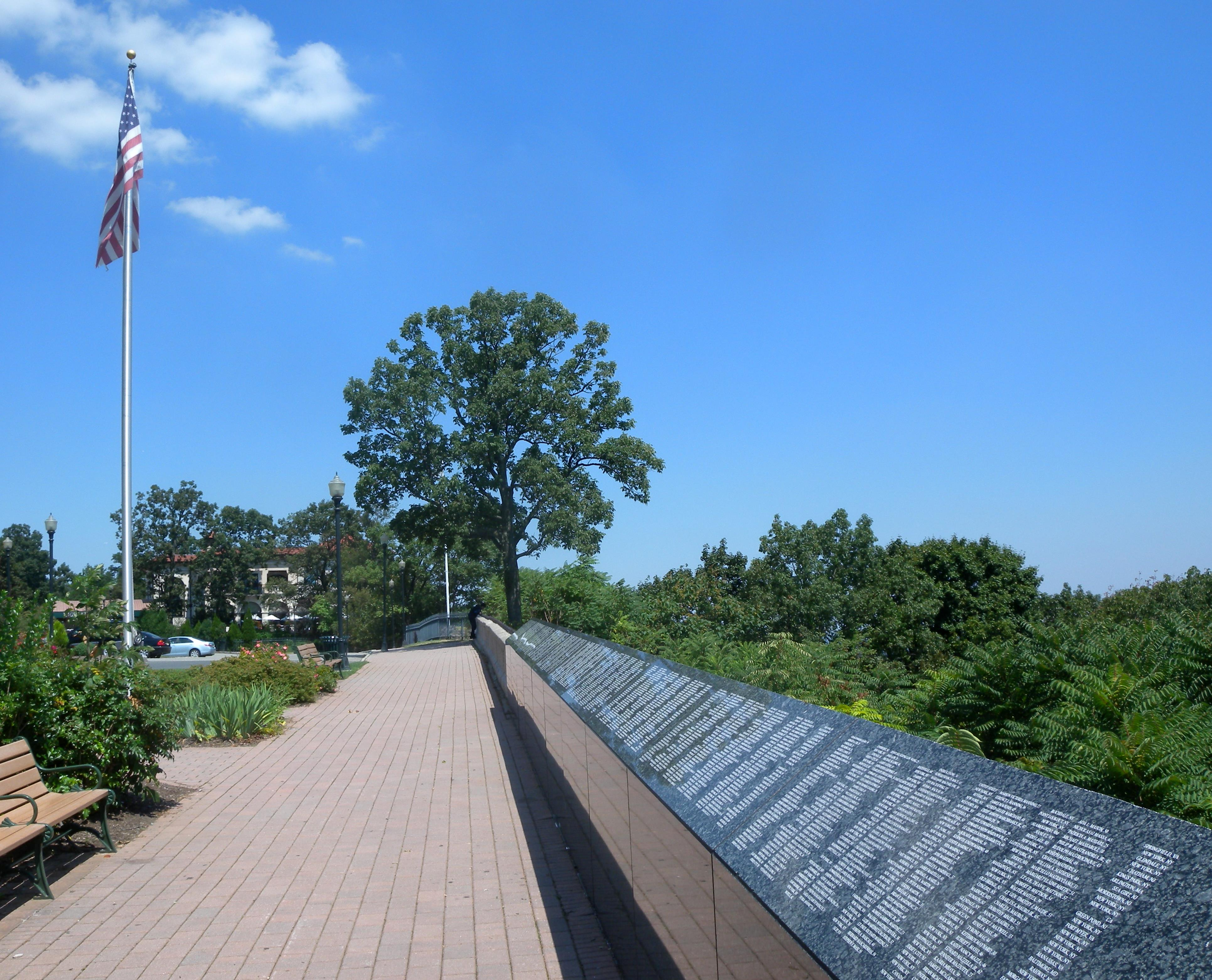
9/11 memorial

The reservation is named after the Eagle Rock, a bare rock looking down from the mountain, which marks the boundary between the towns of Montclair and West Orange, New Jersey. The Lenape Trail passes through the reservation. There are many streams that flow throughout the reservation. The forests are home to abundant wildlife, including deer and occasionally bears.

Also located on the grounds of the reservation is a restaurant and special event location called Highlawn Pavilion. The building was once a casino, in the old sense of the word meaning country house, which had various functions through the years, including as a place for refreshments.

== 9/11 memorial ==
After the September 11 terrorist attacks, residents of nearby communities gathered to view the aftermath of the attacks on the World Trade Center. Because of this, on October 20, 2002, Essex County Executive James W. Treffinger, along with many local residents and dignitaries, dedicated a section of the reservation, which overlooks the Manhattan skyline, to a memorial built in honor of those killed during the attacks. The names of all who perished at the World Trade Center or on the two planes that crashed into the twin towers are permanently inscribed in a marble memorial.

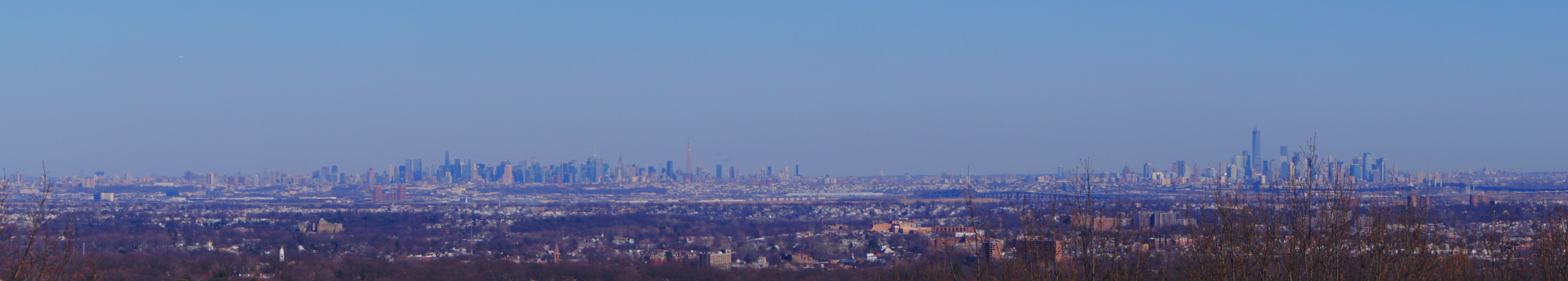
A view of Midtown and Lower Manhattan from the 9/11 Memorial
