= Charles Morris =

Charles or Charlie Morris may refer to:

== Military ==
- Charles Morris (surveyor general) (1711–1781), Canadian army officer, officeholder, and judge
- Charles Morris (naval officer) (1784–1856), US naval administrator and officer
- Charles Manigault Morris (1820–1895), US Navy officer
- Charles B. Morris (1931–1996), American soldier and Medal of Honor recipient
- Charles Temple Morris (1876–1956), officer in the British Indian Army

== Politicians ==
- Charles Morris (1731–1802), Canadian surveyor, judge and political figure in Nova Scotia
- Charles Morris (1759–1831), Canadian surveyor and political figure in Nova Scotia
- Charles Morris (Australian politician) (1863–1918), member of the South Australian Legislative Council
- Charles Morris (British politician) (1926–2012), British MP for Manchester, Openshaw
- Charles Morris (Barbadian politician), member of the Senate of Barbados
- Charles E. Morris (1814–1902), Wisconsin judge and politician
- Charles F. Morris (1876–1951), Wisconsin lawyer and politician
- Charles J. Morris (1871–1924), speaker of the House of the South Dakota Legislature

== Scientists and academics ==
- Charles A. Morris (1853–1914), American engineer
- Charles Morris, Baron Morris of Grasmere (1898–1990), British philosopher and life peer
- Charles W. Morris (1901–1979), American semiotician and philosopher
- Charles Morris (legal educator) (21st century), American professor of law emeritus at Southern Methodist University School of Law

== Sportsmen ==
- Charles Morris (boxer) (1879–1959), British Olympic medalist in 1908
- Charles Morris (cricketer, born 1880) (1880–1947), English cricketer
- Charlie Morris (footballer) (1880–1952), Welsh international footballer
- Charles Morris (racewalker) (1915–1985), British Olympian racewalker
- Charlie Morris (hammer thrower) (1926–2015), Australian hammer thrower
- Charles Morris (cricketer, born 1939) (1939–1990), English cricketer
- Charlie Morris (cricketer, born 1992), English cricketer
- Charles Morris (New Zealand cricketer) (1840–?), New Zealand cricketer

== Writers ==
- Charles R. Morris (1939–2021), American business writer
- Charles Morris (American writer) (1833–1922), American writer of dime novels
- Charles Morris (poet) (1745–1838), British poet
- Charles Morris, author and host of the Haven Today radio program, 2000–2024

== Others ==
- Charles Arthur Morris (1860–1942), British surgeon
- Chuck Morris (1974–2023) and son Charley Morris of the American band Lotus, died together in 2023
- Charlie Morris (The Dumping Ground character), portrayed by Emily Burnett
