= Charles Richard Morris =

Charles Richard Morris may refer to:

- Charles Morris (Australian politician) (1863–1918), timber merchant and politician in South Australia
- Charles Morris (cricketer, born 1880) (1880–1947), English cricketer
- Charlie Morris (footballer) (1880–1952), English footballer
- Charles Morris, Baron Morris of Grasmere (1898–1990), academic philosopher and Vice-Chancellor of the University of Leeds
- Charles Morris (British politician) (1926–2012), British Labour politician
- Charles R. Morris (1939–2021), American lawyer, banker, and author.
