= Weird US =

Weird US or Weird U.S. may refer to:

- Weird US (book series), an American series of travel guides
- Weird U.S. (TV series), a reality television series based on the books
