= Bloomfield High School (New Jersey) =

High school in Essex County, New Jersey, US

Location
- 160 Broad Street; Bloomfield, Essex County, New Jersey 07003; United States; 40.799349°N 74.1971°W

Information
- Type: Public high school
- Established: 1871
- School district: Bloomfield Public Schools
- NCES School ID: 340183001980
- Principal: Christopher Jennings
- Faculty: 158.6 FTEs
- Grades: 9-12
- Enrollment: 2,055 (as of 2024–25)
- Student to teacher ratio: 13.0:1
- Colors: Cardinal red and gray
- Athletics conference: Super Essex Conference (general); North Jersey Super Football Conference (football)
- Team name: Bengals
- Rival: Montclair High School
- Website: bhs.bloomfield.k12.nj.us

Bloomfield High School is a four-year comprehensive public high school serving students in ninth through twelfth grades in Bloomfield, in Essex County, in the U.S. state of New Jersey, operating as the lone secondary school of the Bloomfield Public Schools. The school was established in 1871, with its current facility completed in 1911.

As of the 2024–25 school year, the school had an enrollment of 2,055 students and 158.6 classroom teachers (on an FTE basis), for a student–teacher ratio of 13.0:1. There were 885 students (43.1% of enrollment) eligible for free lunch and 148 (7.2% of students) eligible for reduced-cost lunch.

== History ==
The original high school building, located on Broad Street, was completed in 1871 at a cost of $30,000 (equivalent to $810,000 in 2025). The current school building was built as an extension of the original building and celebrated its 100th anniversary in 2011.

== Awards, recognition and rankings ==
The school was the 217th-ranked public high school in New Jersey out of 339 schools statewide in New Jersey Monthly magazine's September 2014 cover story on the state's "Top Public High Schools", using a new ranking methodology. The school had been ranked 221st in the state of 328 schools in 2012, after being ranked 226th in 2010 out of 322 schools listed. The magazine ranked the school 181st in 2008 out of 316 schools. The school was ranked 225th in the magazine's September 2006 issue, which surveyed 316 schools across the state. Schooldigger.com ranked the school 277th out of 376 public high schools statewide in its 2010 rankings (a decrease of 9 positions from the 2009 rank) which were based on the combined percentage of students classified as proficient or above proficient on the language arts literacy and mathematics components of the High School Proficiency Assessment (HSPA).

== Athletics ==
The Bloomfield High School Bengals compete in the Super Essex Conference, which is comprised of public and private high schools in Essex County divided by size and skill level, having been established following a reorganization of sports leagues in Northern New Jersey by the New Jersey State Interscholastic Athletic Association (NJSIAA). Until the NJSIAA's 2009 realignment, the school had participated in Division A of the Northern New Jersey Interscholastic League, which included high schools located in Bergen, Essex and Passaic counties, and was separated into three divisions based on NJSIAA size classification. With 1,473 students in grades 10–12, the school was classified by the NJSIAA for the 2019–20 school year as Group IV for most athletic competition purposes, which included schools with an enrollment of 1,060 to 5,049 students in that grade range. The football team competes in the Liberty White division of the North Jersey Super Football Conference, which includes 112 schools competing in 20 divisions, making it the nation's biggest football-only high school sports league. The school was classified by the NJSIAA as Group V North for football for 2024–2026, which included schools with 1,317 to 5,409 students.

The school participates with Columbia High School in a joint ice hockey team in which Nutley High School is the host school / lead agency. The co-op program operates under agreements scheduled to expire at the end of the 2023–24 school year.

The school's football rivalry with Montclair High School was listed at 19th on NJ.com's 2017 list "Ranking the 31 fiercest rivalries in N.J. HS football". Bloomfield was the stronger school in the initial years of the competition, with Montclair dominating in since the early 1980s and leading the rivalry with a 69-26-1 overall record as of 2017.

The baseball team won the Greater Newark Tournament in 1935, 1945, 1952 and 1996. The program's four titles are tied for fifth-most in tournament history through 2019. The team won the 1996 Greater Newark Tournament title, defeating Livingston High School 3-0 in the finals.

The boys basketball team won the Group IV state championship in 1937 (defeating Asbury Park High School in the tournament finals), 1953 (vs. Thomas Jefferson High School), 1957 (vs. Trenton Central High School), 1958 (vs. Linden High School) and in 1971 (vs. Ewing High School). The 1937 team won the Group IV title with a 30-24 win against Asbury Park in front of a crowd of 3,600 at Rutgers University. The 1953 team won the Group IV title against Thomas Jefferson of Elizabeth with a 60-45 victory in front of a crowd of 3,500 at the Elizabeth Armory for the championship game. The team ran their record to 26-0 after winning the 1957 Group IV title with a 51-47 victory against Trenton Central in the championship game played at Princeton University. With a 71-64 win against Linden in the Group IV championship game at Rutgers University, the 1958 team finished the season with a record of 24-0 and extended their winning streak to 50 games.

The boys cross country team won the Group IV state championship in 1956 and 1968.

The boys soccer team won the Group IV state title in 1966 (as co-champion with Steinert High School) and 1974 (vs. Neptune High School).

The girls basketball team won the Group IV state championship in 1989, against runner-up Neptune High School in the playoff finals.

The Bengal bowlers, with three female and two male team members, won the Essex County Tournament for the first time in the 1998–99 season.

The girls volleyball team won the Group IV state championship in 1999, defeating runner-up Ridgewood High School in the final match of the playoffs.

The girls' softball team made it to the 2006 North I Group IV state sectional championship, falling to Ridgewood High School by 3–0.

The boys' volleyball team won the 2006 Essex County Championship for the first time in Bloomfield's history, after defeating Livingston High School. The team advanced to the state sectional quarterfinals over Livingston High School once again, and fell to Fair Lawn High School.

The wrestling team won the 2007 North I, Group IV state sectional championship, the first in team history, with a 34–33 win over Hackensack High School.

== Administration ==
The school's principal is Christopher Jennings. His administration team includes four assistant principals.

== Notable alumni ==
- Alaa Abdelnaby (born 1968), professional basketball player
- Robert Birmelin (born 1933), figurative painter, printmaker and draughtsman
- Hank Borowy (1916–2004), professional baseball player who pitched in Major League Baseball from 1942 to 1951
- Kevin Burkhardt (born 1974, class of 1992), sportscaster who has been one of the play-by-play voices for Fox NFL and for the Tampa Bay Rays on Fox Sports Sun
- Joe Duckworth (1921-2007), football end who played in the NFL for the Washington Redskins
- Bud Ellor (1905-1932), professional football player who spent one season in the National Football League with the Newark Tornadoes in 1930
- Tom Fleming (1951-2017), distance runner who won the 1973 and 1975 New York City Marathon
- Bill Geyer (1919-2004), football halfback in the National Football League who played three seasons for the Chicago Bears
- Johnny Gibson (1905–2006), Olympic athlete
- Roger Lee Hall (born 1942, class of 1960), musicologist
- Ernie Hambacher (1906–1990), American football fullback who played in the NFL for the Orange Tornadoes
- Benjamin Holman (1930–2007), pioneering African American newspaper and television reporter
- Michael Knapp (born 2000), professional soccer player who plays as a midfielder for USL Championship club New York Red Bulls II
- Mike Kochel (1916-1994), one of the seven blocks of granite at Fordham University, he played in the NFL for the Chicago Cardinals
- Andy Kostecka (1921–2007), Basketball Association of America player for the Indianapolis Jets
- Bob Ley (born 1955), ESPN sportscaster
- Frank Muehlheuser (1926–2006), American football fullback and linebacker who played in the NFL for the Boston Yanks and New York Bulldogs
- Robert A. Pascal (1934–2021), politician who served as county executive of Anne Arundel County, Maryland from 1975 to 1982
- Charlie Puleo (born 1955) a Major League Baseball pitcher from 1981 to 1989 for the New York Mets, Cincinnati Reds and Atlanta Braves
- Jack Robinson (1921-2000), professional baseball pitcher whose MLB career consisted of three games played for the Boston Red Sox in 1949
- Don Savage, (1919-1961, class of 1937), Major League Baseball player for the New York Yankees in 1944 and 1945
- Mark Sceurman (Class of 1975), graphic artist who is co-creator and publisher of Weird NJ magazine, his fellow graduates voted him "most likely to spontaneously combust"
- Anish Shroff (born 1982), ESPN sportscaster and play-by-play voice of the NFL's Carolina Panthers
- Kristjan Sokoli (born 1991), NFL defensive end for the New York Giants
- Robert Stempel (1933–2011), former chairman and CEO of General Motors, former chairman and CEO of ECD Ovonics
- Mildred Fairbanks Stone (1902–2002), the first woman officer of a major American life insurance company (Mutual Benefit)
- Frank Tripucka (1927–2013), former pro football quarterback
- Kelly Tripucka (born 1959), former NBA player and commentator for the New Jersey Nets
- Todd Tripucka (born 1954), former college basketball standout for Lafayette
- Marlene VerPlanck (1933-2018), jazz and pop vocalist whose body of work centered on big band jazz, the American songbook and cabaret
- Bob Woollard (born 1940), former professional basketball player for the Miami Floridians of the American Basketball Association
