= Birmelin =

Birmelin is a surname Notable people with the surname include:

- Jerry Birmelin (born 1949), American politician
- John Birmelin (1873–1950), American poet
- Robert Birmelin (born 1933), American figurative painter
