= Weird US (book series) =

Series of travel guides

- Author: Various
- Country: United States
- Language: English
- Genre: Guide books, coffee table books
- Published: 2003 – 2011
- Media type: Print (hardback & paperback)
- Website: www.weirdus.com

Weird US is a series of guide books written by various authors and published by Sterling Publishing of New York City. The series originated with Weird NJ, a magazine published by Mark Moran and Mark Sceurman that chronicles local legends and other peculiarities in New Jersey. The growing popularity of the magazine resulted in the publication of a book written by Moran and Sceurman, Weird NJ: Your Travel Guide to New Jersey's Local Legends and Best Kept Secrets. After the book was released, Moran and Sceurman began receiving letters from individuals across the United States, detailing oddities from their home states, which prompted Moran and Sceurman to create Weird US.

The Weird US book series spawned a television series of the same name that aired on the History Channel from 2004 to 2005. As of July 2011, all but seventeen states (Alabama, Alaska, Arkansas, Delaware, Hawaii, Idaho, Iowa, Kansas, Mississippi, Montana, Nebraska, New Mexico, North Dakota, South Dakota, Utah, West Virginia and Wyoming) have been covered within individual books. There are also two books about hauntings and one book about unusual features of England.

== Titles in series ==
=== General U.S. ===
- Weird U.S.: Your Travel Guide to America's Local Legends and Best Kept Secrets. Sterling (October 2004). Mark Moran, Mark Sceurman. ISBN 0-7607-5043-2
- Weird U.S. The ODDyssey Continues: Your Travel Guide to America's Local Legends and Best Kept Secrets. Sterling (November 2008). Mark Moran, Mark Sceurman, Matt Lake. ISBN 1-4027-4544-3
- Weird U.S.: A Freaky Field Trip Through the 50 States. Sterling (July 2011). Matt Lake, Randy Fairbanks. ISBN 1-4027-5462-0
- Weird Civil War: Your Travel Guide to the Ghostly Legends and Best-Kept Secrets of the American Civil War. Sterling (April 2015)

=== Individual states ===
- Weird Arizona: Your Travel Guide to Arizona's Local Legends and Best Kept Secrets. Sterling (October 2007). Wesley Treat. ISBN 1-4027-3938-9
- Weird California: Your Travel Guide to California's Local Legends and Best Kept Secrets. Sterling (March 2006). Greg Bishop, Joe Oesterle, Mike Marinacci. ISBN 1-4027-3384-4
- Weird Carolinas: Your Travel Guide to Carolinas' Local Legends and Best Kept Secrets. Sterling (June 2007). Roger Manley. ISBN 1-4027-3939-7
- Weird Colorado: Your Travel Guide to Colorado's Local Legends and Best Kept Secrets. Sterling (May 2010). Charmaine Ortega Getz. ISBN 1-4027-5463-9
- Weird Florida: Your Travel Guide to Florida's Local Legends and Best Kept Secrets. Sterling (April 2005). Charlie Carlson. ISBN 0-7607-5945-6
- Weird Georgia: Your Travel Guide to Georgia's Local Legends and Best Kept Secrets. Sterling (April 2006). Mark Sceurman, Mark Moran. ISBN 1-4027-3388-7
- Weird Hollywood: Your Travel Guide to Hollywood's Local Legends and Best Kept Secrets. Sterling (October 2010). Joe Oesterle, Mark Moran, Mark Sceurman. ISBN 1-4027-5460-4
- Weird Illinois: Your Travel Guide to Illinois' Local Legends and Best Kept Secrets. Sterling (April 2005). Troy Taylor, Mark Sceurman. ISBN 0-7607-5943-X
- Weird Indiana: Your Travel Guide to Indiana's Local Legends and Best Kept Secrets. Sterling (May 2008). Mark Marimen, James A Willis, Troy Taylor. ISBN 1-4027-5452-3
- Weird Kentucky: Your Travel Guide to Kentucky's Local Legends and Best Kept Secrets. Sterling (May 2008). Jeffrey Scott Holland. ISBN 1-4027-5438-8
- Weird Las Vegas and Nevada: Your Alternative Travel Guide to Sin City and the Silver State. Sterling (October 2007). Joe Oesterle, Tim Cridland. ISBN 1-4027-3940-0
- Weird Louisiana: Your Travel Guide to Louisiana's Local Legends and Best Kept Secrets. Sterling (January 2010). Roger Manley, Mark Moran, Mark Sceurman. ISBN 1-4027-4554-0
- Weird Maryland: Your Travel Guide to Maryland's Local Legends and Best Kept Secrets. Sterling (July 2006). Matt Lake. ISBN 1-4027-3906-0
- Weird Massachusetts: Your Travel Guide to Massachusetts' Local Legends and Best Kept Secrets. Sterling (May 2008). Jeff Belanger. ISBN 1-4027-5437-X
- Weird Michigan: Your Travel Guide to Michigan's Local Legends and Best Kept Secrets. Sterling (July 2006). Linda S. Godfrey. ISBN 1-4027-3907-9
- Weird Minnesota: Your travel guide to Minnesota's local legends and best kept secrets. Sterling (September 2006). Eric Dregni. ISBN 1-4027-3908-7
- Weird Missouri: Your Travel Guide to Missouri's Local Legends and Best Kept Secrets. Sterling (November 2008). James Strait. ISBN 1-4027-4555-9
- Weird New England: Your Travel Guide to New England's Local Legends and Best Kept Secrets. Sterling (September 2005). Joseph A. Citro. ISBN 1-4027-3330-5
- Weird N.J.: Your Travel Guide to New Jersey's Local Legends and Best Kept Secrets. Sterling (August 2003). Mark Moran, Mark Sceurman. ISBN 0-7607-3979-X
- Weird N.J., Vol. 2: Your Travel Guide to New Jersey's Local Legends and Best Kept Secrets. Sterling (September 2006). Mark Moran, Mark Sceurman. ISBN 1-4027-3941-9
- Weird New York: Your Travel Guide to New York's Local Legends and Best Kept Secrets. Sterling (November 2005). Chris Gethard. ISBN 1-4027-3383-6
- Weird Ohio: Your Travel Guide to Ohio's Local Legends and Best Kept Secrets. Sterling (January 2006). Loren Coleman, Andy Henderson, James A Willis. ISBN 1-4027-3382-8
- Weird Oklahoma: Your Travel Guide to Oklahoma's Local Legends and Best Kept Secrets. Sterling (June 2011). Wesley Treat, Mark Sceurman and Mark Moran. ISBN 1-4027-5436-1
- Weird Oregon: Your Travel Guide to Oregon's Local Legends and Best Kept Secrets. Sterling (June 2011). Al Eufrasio, Jefferson Davis, Mark Sceurman and Mark Moran. ISBN 1-4027-5466-3
- Weird Pennsylvania: Your Travel Guide to Pennsylvania's Local Legends and Best Kept Secrets. Sterling (July 2005). Matt Lake. ISBN 1-4027-3279-1
- Weird Tennessee: Your Travel Guide to Tennessee's Local Legends and Best Kept Secrets. Sterling (May 2011). Roger Manley, Mark Sceurman and Mark Moran ISBN 1-4027-5465-5
- Weird Texas: Your Travel Guide to Texas's Local Legends and Best Kept Secrets. Sterling (July 2005). Wesley Treat, Heather Shades, Rob Riggs. ISBN 1-4027-3280-5
- Weird Virginia: Your Travel Guide to Virginia's Local Legends and Best Kept Secrets. Sterling (June 2007). Jeff Bahr, Troy Taylor, Loren Coleman. ISBN 1-4027-3942-7
- Weird Washington: Your Travel Guide to Washington's Local Legends and Best Kept Secrets. Sterling (May 2008). Jefferson Davis, Al Eufrasio. ISBN 1-4027-4545-1
- Weird Wisconsin: Your Travel Guide to Wisconsin's Local Legends and Best Kept Secrets. Sterling (April 2005). Linda S. Godfrey. ISBN 0-7607-5944-8

=== Non-U.S. ===
- Weird England: Your Travel Guide to England's Local Legends and Best Kept Secrets. Sterling (October 2007). Matt Lake. ISBN 1-4027-4229-0

=== Hauntings ===
- Weird Hauntings: True Tales of Ghostly Places. Sterling (September 2006). Joanne Austin, Mark Moran, Mark Sceurman and Ryan Doan. ISBN 1-4027-4226-6
- Weird Encounters: True Tales of Haunted Places. Sterling (September 2010). Joanne Austin and Ryan Doan. ISBN 1-4027-5461-2
