= Bloomfield Middle School =

Bloomfield Middle School may refer to:

- Bloomfield Middle School, Bloomfield, New Jersey - Bloomfield Public Schools
- Bloomfield Middle School, Macon, Georgia (now closed) - Bibb County School District
