= Evil Clown of Middletown =

Monument in Middletown, New Jersey

"Calico"
- Evil Clown of Middletown
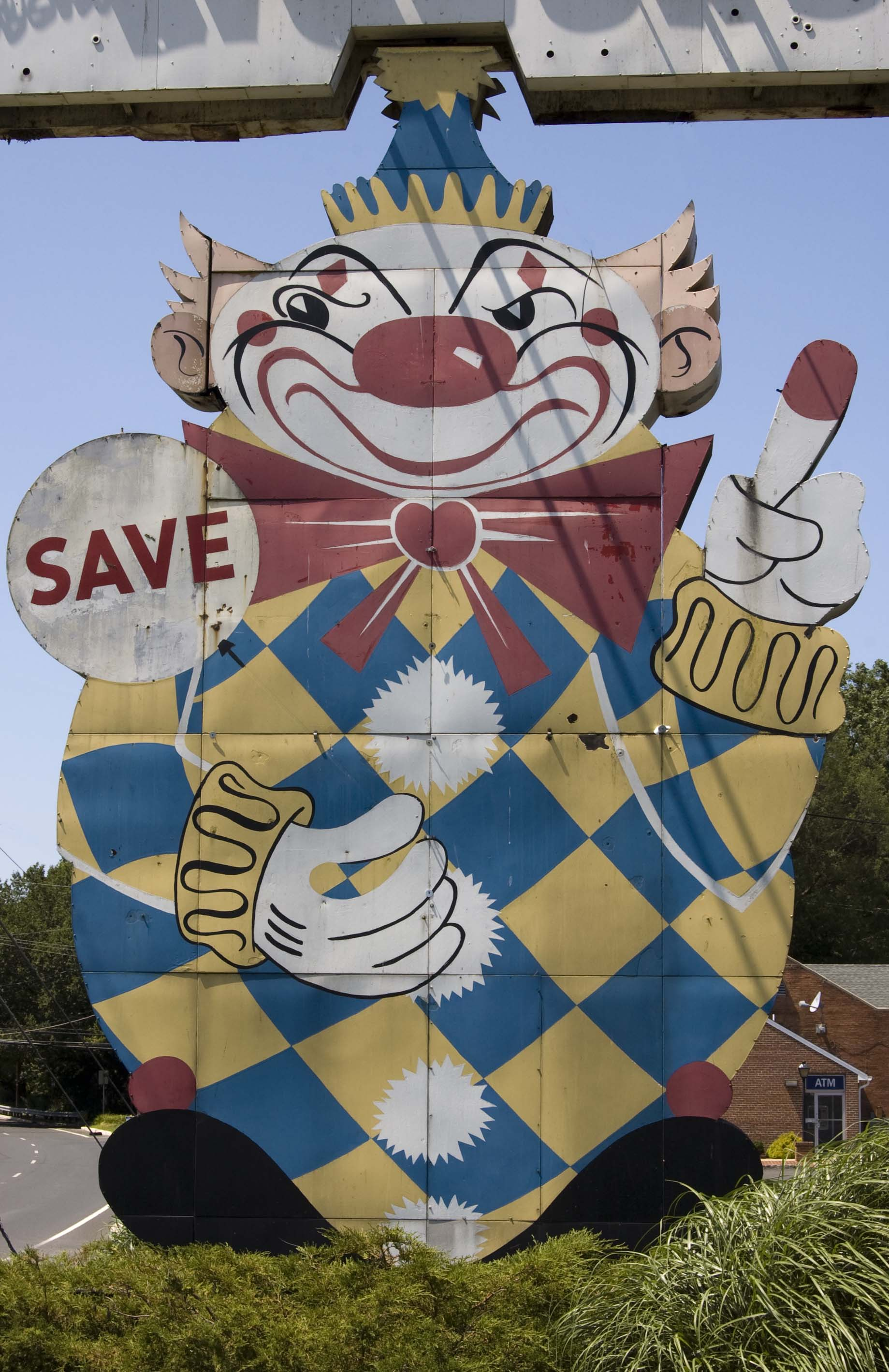
- The Evil Clown of Middletown
- Interactive map of "Calico"
- Location: Middletown, New Jersey
- Coordinates: 40.3917°N 74.0991°W
- Designer: Leslie Worth Thomas
- Type: Advertising sign
- Material: Galvanized steel
- Height: 22 feet (6.7 m)
- Opening date: January 18, 1956

The Evil Clown of Middletown is a large outdoor sign in Middletown, New Jersey. Originally built by and for Food Circus grocery store, which later became known as the regional supermarket Foodtown, it is now a roadside display and de facto advertising sign for a nearby Spirits Liquors. Much of the clown's notoriety stems from its sinister-looking face, which might be described as bearing a vaguely amused sideways scowl.

== History ==
It was originally constructed in 1956 by Joseph Azzolina to advertise his Food Circus grocery store (the predecessor to today’s Foodtown supermarket chain). In its early years it rotated continuously by electric motor, a then-common ad gimmick that went out of style (or economic practicality) by the mid-1970s or so. The clown has long since been fixed in place.

The clown is the work of Road Ad Sign Company painter Leslie Worth Thomas who also created the mural Tillie, at the Palace Amusements building in Asbury Park. One hand of the figure originally held a sort of fool's scepter tipped with a pom-pom or ball; the rod at one point was painted out, with the "ball" now treated as a kind of badge or sign-within-a-sign.

The giant clown’s slyly sinister grin and blood-red tipped index finger have earned it the nickname the "Evil Clown of Middletown" in popular culture. The moniker was perhaps first coined by local author Doug Kirby, of Roadside America fame, who grew up in the area and remembers marveling at the odd icon from an early age.

== Uncertain future ==
In 1993, the township began exploring the idea of a major redevelopment in the area where the Clown stands. Dubbed "Middletown Center," it would feature up to 750,000 square feet (70,000 m^{2}) of retail space; 250,000 square feet (23,000 m^{2}) of office space; 4500 parking spaces, 4 single family homes; 220 townhouses and apartments; and set aside space for a school to be leased to the Township. To date, the project has been delayed numerous times due to public outcry over increased traffic and the destruction of the only open space property in the township.

In 2015, the project again came up and has begun to show promise after a 2009 New Jersey Supreme Court declined to hear appeals by the Middletown Township government challenging the project. To date, several campaigns have sprung up in effort to save the roadside attraction from destruction.

== Popular culture ==
The clown's first starring role was in the opening sequence of the Philip Botti 1996 movie Middletown. The movie won the New York Underground Film Festival Choice award.

It has been featured in the local New Jersey magazine Weird NJ, as well as on The Tonight Show with Jay Leno in a Kevin Smith short.

There is a deleted scene in the 2000 film Vulgar (produced by Kevin Smith), in which the main character is still traumatized after being raped and just stands next to the Clown of Middletown, depressed.

The Evil Clown also appears in the first few minutes of Smith's 2006 film Clerks II. His 2022 film Clerks III contains a scene where the main characters drive past the Evil Clown, and a later scene has Jay wearing a sweatshirt with a picture of the Evil Clown printed on it.
