= Bud Ellor =

American football player (1905–1932)

No. 43
- Positions: Guard, end

Personal information
- Born: 1905; Bloomfield, New Jersey, U.S.
- Died: February 11, 1932 (aged 26–27); Jersey City, New Jersey, U.S.
- Listed height: 6 ft 2 in (1.88 m)
- Listed weight: 205 lb (93 kg)

Career information
- High school: Bloomfield (NJ)
- College: Bucknell

Career history
- Newark Tornadoes (1930)

Career NFL statistics
- Games played: 12
- Stats at Pro Football Reference

Albert Wesley "Bud" Ellor (1905 – February 11, 1932) was an American professional football player who spent one season in the National Football League with the Newark Tornadoes in 1930. Ellor appeared in all 12 games the team played, starting six of them.

Born in Bloomfield, New Jersey, Ellor attended Bloomfield High School and played for the Bucknell Bison football team.
