= Bloomfield, New Jersey =

Township in Essex County, New Jersey, US

- Township
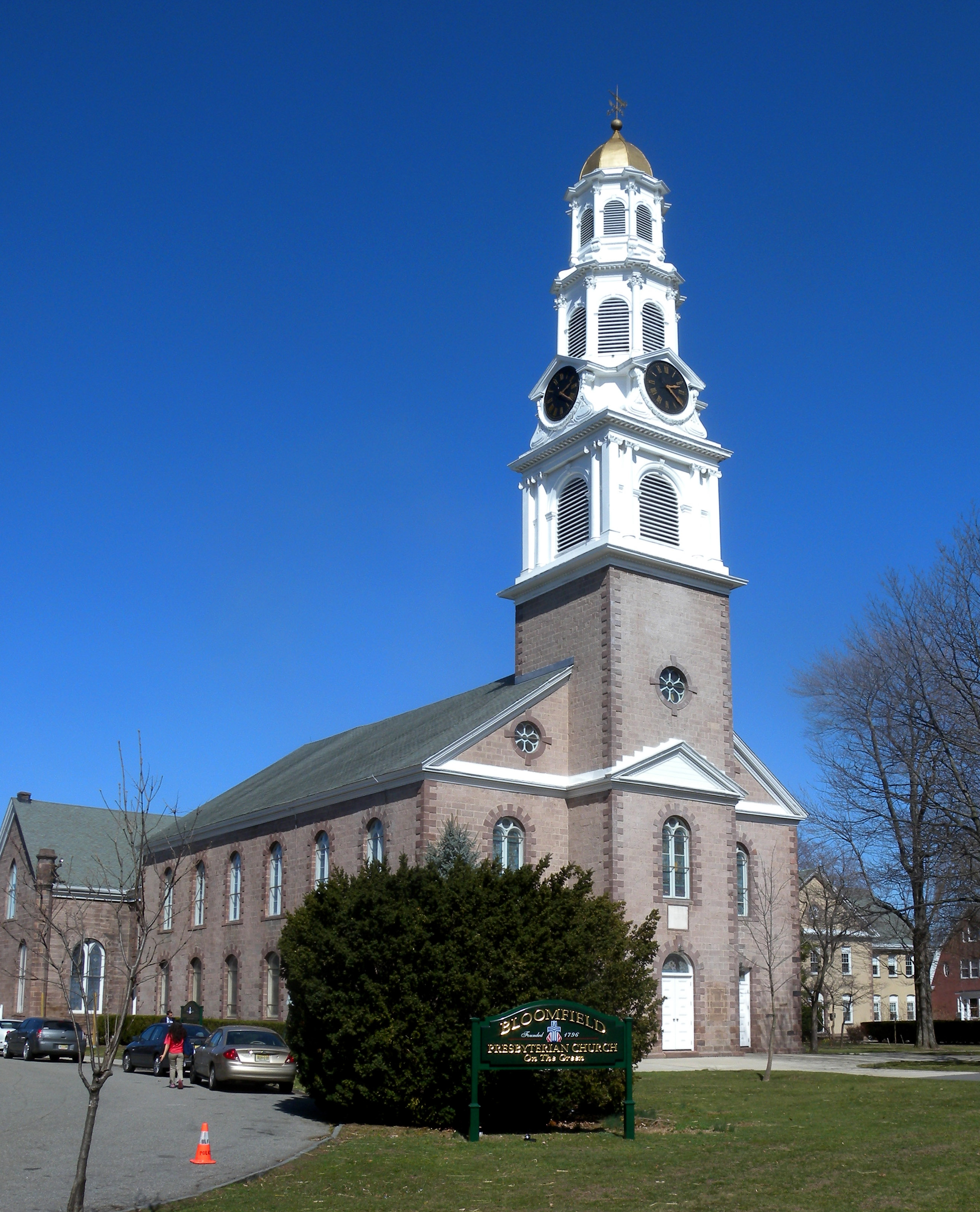
- Presbyterian Church, for which the township was named

- Seal
- Interactive map of Bloomfield, New Jersey
- Location in Essex County Location in New Jersey Location in the United States
- Coordinates: 40.809128°N 74.187155°W
- Country: United States
- State: New Jersey
- County: Essex
- Incorporated: March 23, 1812
- Named for: Joseph Bloomfield

Government
  - Type: Special charter
  - Body: Township Council
  - Mayor: Jenny Mundell (D, term ends December 31, 2028)
  - Administrator: Anthony G. DeZenzo (acting)
  - Municipal clerk: Louise M. Palagano

Area
  - Total: 5.36 sq mi (13.88 km^{2})
  - Land: 5.34 sq mi (13.82 km^{2})
  - Water: 0.023 sq mi (0.06 km^{2}) 0.45%
  - Rank: 268th of 565 in state 7th of 22 in county
- Elevation: 174 ft (53 m)

Population (2020)
  - Total: 53,105
  - Estimate (2024): 55,416
  - Rank: 36th of 565 in state 4th of 22 in county
  - Density: 9,950.3/sq mi (3,841.8/km^{2})
  - Rank: 38th of 565 in state 6th of 22 in county
- Time zone: UTC−05:00 (Eastern (EST))
  - Summer (DST): UTC−04:00 (Eastern (EDT))
- ZIP Code: 07003
- Area codes: 862/973
- FIPS code: 3401306260
- GNIS feature ID: 1729714
- Website: www.bloomfieldtwpnj.com

Bloomfield is a township in Essex County, in the U.S. state of New Jersey, and an inner-ring suburb of Newark. As of the 2020 United States census, the township's population was 53,105, an increase of 5,790 (+12.2%) from the 2010 census count of 47,315, which in turn reflected a decline of 368 (-0.8%) from the 47,683 counted in the 2000 census. It is the location of the Bloomfield Green Historic District, which was added to the National Register of Historic Places in 1978.

== History ==
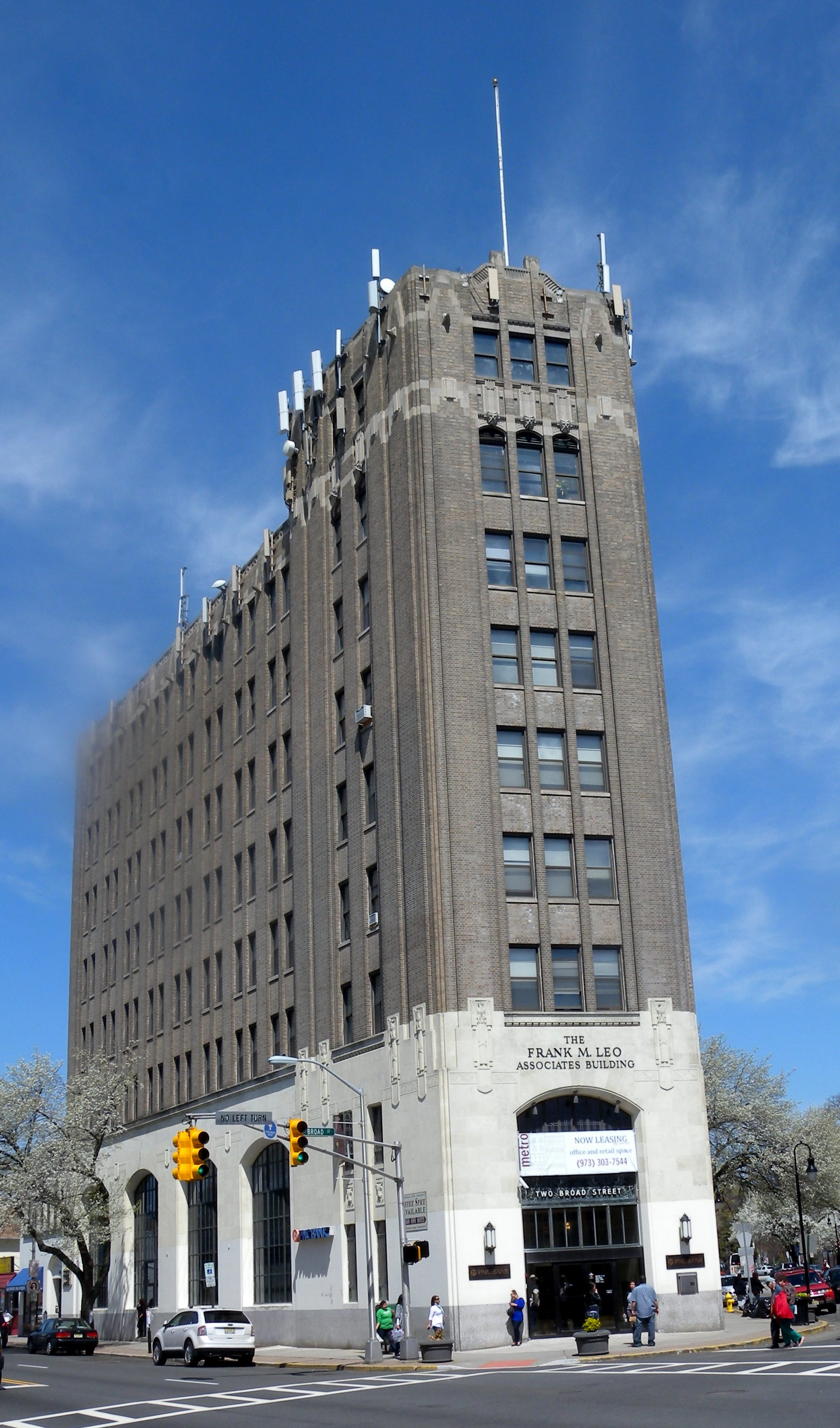
Frank M. Leo Associates Building in downtown Bloomfield

The earliest settlers of the area were the Lenape Native Americans. The initial patent for European settlement of the land that would become Bloomfield Township was granted to the English Puritan colonists of Newark, and the area assigned to Essex County in 1675, and Newark Township in 1693. From the 1690s to about the 1720s, much of the northern and eastern land was sold to descendants of New Netherland colonists who had settled Acquackanonk, and the remainder mostly to English families. Speertown (now Upper Montclair), Stone House Plains (now Brookdale), and Second River (now Belleville and Nutley) were essentially Dutch and Jersey Dutch-speaking, while Cranetown, Watsessing, and the Morris Neighborhood (now North Center) were predominantly English. Starting in the mid-18th century, the English and Dutch neighborhoods gradually integrated, with Thomas Cadmus being among the first Dutchmen to settle in an English neighborhood.

Numerous residents served in the Revolutionary War. No significant engagements occurred in Bloomfield, although the locale was on the Continental Army's retreat route after the Battle of Long Island; British and American troops conducted foraging operations; and General George Washington is believed to have visited at least two residences. The Green was set aside to commemorate the use of that space for drilling of militia.

The Presbyterian Society of Bloomfield (now the Bloomfield Presbyterian Church on the Green) was formed in 1794 and named in honor of then-brigadier Joseph Bloomfield, commander of New Jersey troops in the Whiskey Rebellion. About the same time, the Dutch Reformed Church of Stone House Plains (now Brookdale Reformed Church) was established. The two churches became integral institutions of southern and northern Bloomfield, respectively.

Bloomfield was incorporated as a township from portions of Newark Township by an act of the New Jersey Legislature on March 23, 1812. At the time, the Presbyterian parish's namesake was governor of New Jersey and had recently been appointed brigadier general for service in the looming War of 1812.

At the time it was incorporated, the township covered 20.52 sq mi (53.1 km^{2}) (almost four times its current area of 5.3 sq mi (14 km^{2})) and included several municipalities which were formed from portions of Bloomfield during the course of the nineteenth century, including Belleville (created on April 8, 1839), Montclair (April 15, 1868), Woodside Township (March 24, 1869) and Glen Ridge (February 13, 1895). The Stone House Plains neighborhood was renamed as Brookdale in 1873.

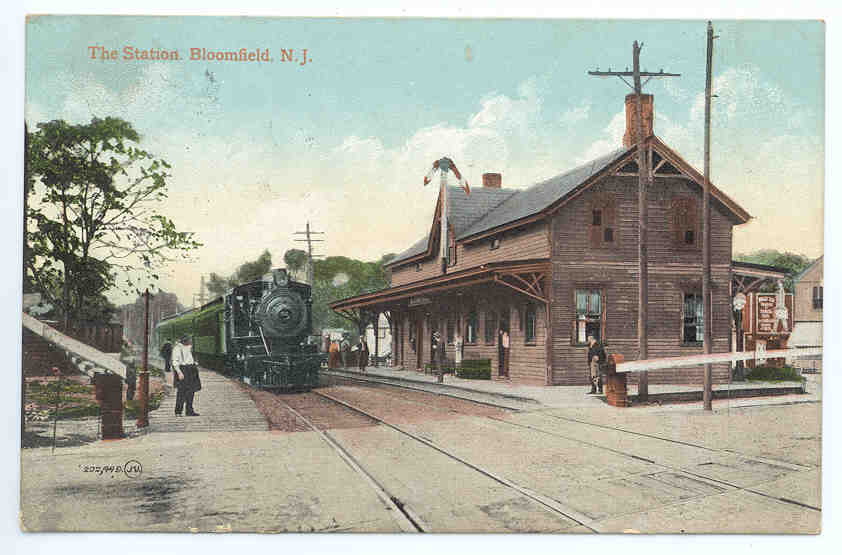
Bloomfield Station in 1908

In the township's first century, Brookdale farms thrived while southern Bloomfield industrialized, and the township's infrastructure, civil framework and social institutions developed. Several miles of the Morris Canal passed through Bloomfield. The Oakes woollen mill thrived as a major supplier to the Union Army.

Bloomfield was incorporated as a town on February 26, 1900. In 1904, the city of Newark failed in its attempts to reannex Bloomfield as part of the "Greater Newark" movement. In 1981, the town was one of seven Essex County municipalities to pass a referendum to become a township, joining four municipalities that had already made the change, of what would ultimately be more than a dozen Essex County municipalities to reclassify themselves as townships in order to take advantage of federal revenue sharing policies that allocated townships a greater share of government aid to municipalities on a per capita basis.

In the 20th century, GE, Westinghouse and Schering built major facilities, and among others, the Charms Candy Company was started and grew. After World War I, Brookdale's farms were developed into residential neighborhoods and supporting services. Substantial population growth continued into the 1950s. During World War II, while many Bloomfield men served in the armed forces, Bloomfield's farms and factories, largely staffed by women, supported the war effort. In the decades after the war, the township's industrial base steadily shut down with stricter environmental regulations, rising labor costs, and growing competition. These influences, as well as construction of the Garden State Parkway, further drove urban decay and related population turnover and stagnation through the latter part of the 20th century.

In the early 21st century, redevelopment of blighted and underutilized properties has further shifted Bloomfield towards being a primarily residential municipality.

== Geography ==
According to the United States Census Bureau, the township had a total area of 5.36 square miles (13.88 km^{2}), including 5.34 square miles (13.82 km^{2}) of land and 0.02 square miles (0.06 km^{2}) of water (0.45%).

Silver Lake (2010 total population of 4,243) is an unincorporated community and census-designated place (CDP) defined by the United States Census Bureau as of the 2010 Census that is split between Belleville (with 3,769 of the CDP's residents) and Bloomfield (474 of the total). Brookdale (2010 population of 9,239) is a CDP located entirely within Bloomfield. Watsessing and Ampere North are CDPs in the southern part of the township that were first listed prior to the 2020 census.

Unincorporated communities, localities and place names located partially or completely within the township include Halycon. Bloomfield is in the New York metropolitan area.

The township borders the municipalities of Belleville, East Orange, Glen Ridge, Montclair, Newark and Nutley in Essex County; and Clifton in Passaic County.

== Demographics ==
Historical population
Census	Pop.	Note	%±
1820	3,085		—
1830	4,309		39.7%
1840	2,528	*	−41.3%
1850	3,385		33.9%
1860	4,790		41.5%
1870	4,580	*	−4.4%
1880	5,748		25.5%
1890	7,708		34.1%
1900	9,668	*	25.4%
1910	15,070		55.9%
1920	22,019		46.1%
1930	38,077		72.9%
1940	41,623		9.3%
1950	49,307		18.5%
1960	51,867		5.2%
1970	52,029		0.3%
1980	47,792		−8.1%
1990	45,061		−5.7%
2000	47,683		5.8%
2010	47,315		−0.8%
2020	53,105		12.2%
2024 (est.)	55,416		4.4%
Population sources: 1820–1920 1820–1910; 1840 1850–1870 1850; 1870 1870–1890 1880–1890; 1890–1910 1900–1930; 1940–2000 2000; 2010 2020

In 2014, the cost of living in Bloomfield was 20% higher than the U.S. average.

According to a 2007 report from CNNMoney.com, the quality of life in Bloomfield in terms of crime are 3 incidents per 1,000 people as compared to the "best places to live average" of 1.3 incidents per 1,000. There were 35 property crime incidents per 1,000 people in Bloomfield as compared to the "best places to live average" of 20.6.

=== 2020 census ===
Bloomfield township, Essex County, New Jersey – Racial and ethnic composition Note: the US Census treats Hispanic/Latino as an ethnic category. This table excludes Latinos from the racial categories and assigns them to a separate category. Hispanics/Latinos may be of any race.
Race / Ethnicity (NH = Non-Hispanic)	Pop 1990	Pop 2000	Pop 2010	Pop 2020	% 1990	% 2000	% 2010	% 2020
White alone (NH)	38,578	30,036	22,291	19,668	85.61%	62.99%	47.06%	37.02%
Black or African American alone (NH)	1,873	5,332	8,092	9,941	4.16%	11.18%	17.12%	18.72%
Native American or Alaska Native alone (NH)	40	51	102	84	0.09%	0.11%	0.22%	0.16%
Asian alone (NH)	2,207	3,980	3,846	4,495	4.90%	8.35%	8.13%	8.47%
Pacific Islander alone (NH)	N/A	30	14	4	N/A	0.06%	0.03%	0.01%
Some Other Race alone (NH)	52	296	407	713	0.12%	0.62%	0.86%	1.34%
Mixed Race or Multi-Racial (NH)	N/A	1,057	957	2,003	N/A	2.22%	2.02%	3.77%
Hispanic or Latino (any race)	2,311	6,901	11,606	16,197	5.13%	14.47%	24.55%	30.52%
Total	45,061	47,683	47,315	53,105	100.00%	100.00%	100.00%	100.00%

=== 2010 census ===
The 2010 United States census counted 47,315 people, 18,387 households, and 11,768 families in the township. The population density was 8,920.5 per square mile (3,444.2/km^{2}). There were 19,470 housing units at an average density of 3,670.7 per square mile (1,417.3/km^{2}). The racial makeup was 59.61% (28,205) White, 18.51% (8,757) Black or African American, 0.41% (193) Native American, 8.22% (3,891) Asian, 0.04% (21) Pacific Islander, 9.35% (4,423) from other races, and 3.86% (1,825) from two or more races. Hispanic or Latino of any race were 24.53% (11,606) of the population.

Of the 18,387 households, 28.3% had children under the age of 18; 44.2% were married couples living together; 14.9% had a female householder with no husband present and 36.0% were non-families. Of all households, 29.5% were made up of individuals and 9.1% had someone living alone who was 65 years of age or older. The average household size was 2.54 and the average family size was 3.20.

21.2% of the population were under the age of 18, 9.1% from 18 to 24, 30.9% from 25 to 44, 26.8% from 45 to 64, and 12.0% who were 65 years of age or older. The median age was 37.7 years. For every 100 females, the population had 89.6 males. For every 100 females ages 18 and older there were 86.4 males.

The Census Bureau's 2006–2010 American Community Survey showed that (in 2010 inflation-adjusted dollars) median household income was $62,831 (with a margin of error of +/− $2,641) and the median family income was $77,936 (+/− $4,120). Males had a median income of $51,498 (+/− $1,805) versus $44,735 (+/− $2,867) for females. The per capita income for the township was $30,421 (+/− $1,122). About 5.8% of families and 7.4% of the population were below the poverty line, including 7.9% of those under age 18 and 7.9% of those age 65 or over.

=== 2000 census ===
As of the 2000 United States census there were 47,683 people, 19,017 households, and 12,075 families residing in the township. The population density was 8,961.5 inhabitants per square mile (3,460.1/km^{2}). There were 19,508 housing units at an average density of 3,666.3 per square mile (1,415.6/km^{2}). The racial makeup of the township was 70.09% White, 11.69% Black, 0.19% Native American, 8.38% Asian, 0.07% Pacific Islander, 6.42% from other races, and 3.16% from two or more races. Hispanic or Latino of any race were 14.47% of the population.

There were 19,017 households, out of which 28.2% had children under the age of 18 living with them, 46.7% were married couples living together, 12.4% had a female householder with no husband present, and 36.5% were non-families. 30.4% of all households were made up of individuals, and 10.6% had someone living alone who was 65 years of age or older. The average household size was 2.49 and the average family size was 3.16.

In the township, 21.1% of the population was under the age of 18, 8.4% from 18 to 24, 34.0% from 25 to 44, 22.3% from 45 to 64, and 14.3% were 65 years of age or older. The median age was 37 years. For every 100 females, there were 90.8 males. For every 100 females age 18 and over, there were 87.1 males.

The median income for a household in the township was $53,289, and the median income for a family was $64,945. Males had a median income of $43,498 versus $36,104 for females. The per capita income for the township was $26,049. About 4.4% of families and 5.9% of the population were below the poverty line, including 6.3% of those under age 18 and 8.2% of those age 65 or over.

== Parks and recreation ==
Brookdale Park, established in 1928, covers over 121 acres (49 ha) in Bloomfield and Montclair, making it the third-largest park in Essex County, of which 77 acres (31 ha) are in Bloomfield. Watsessing Park, which is the county's fourth-largest park, covers 69.67 acres (28.19 ha) split between Bloomfield and East Orange (60 acres (24 ha) in Bloomfield), and features sections of the Second River and Toney's Brook flowing through the park. Both parks are administered by the Essex County Department of Parks, Recreation, and Cultural Affairs.

The Bloomfield Parks and Recreation Department administers eight parks covering 55.23 acres (22.35 ha).

== Government ==
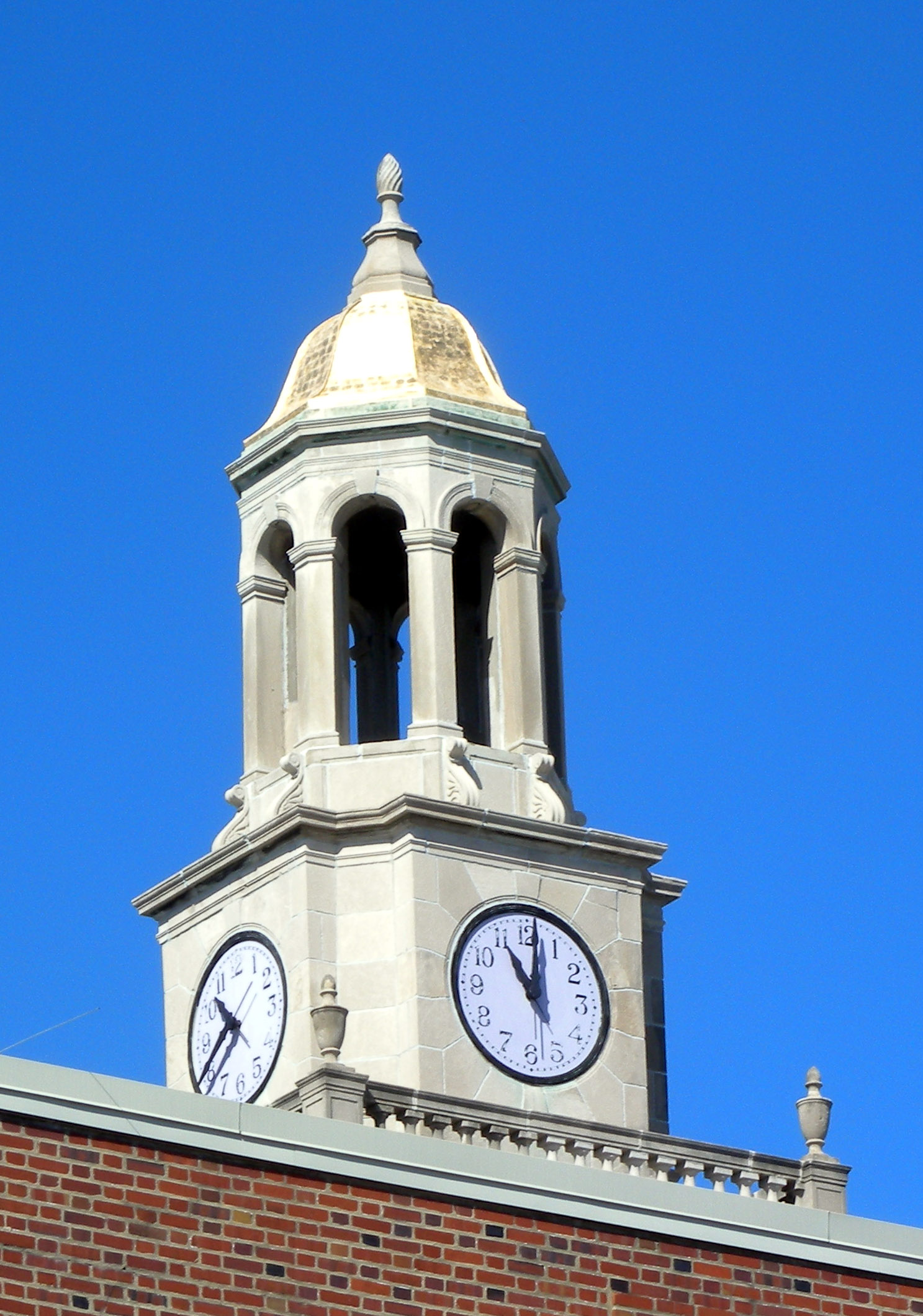
Rotunda of Town Hall

=== Local government ===
Bloomfield operates under a special charter granted by an act of the New Jersey Legislature. The township is one of 11 municipalities (of the 564) statewide that operate under a special charter. The township's governing body is comprised of the Mayor and the six-member Township Council. The mayor and three councilmembers are elected at-large, and one member is elected from each of three wards, with all positions chosen on a partisan basis as part of the November general election. Councilmembers are elected to three-year terms of office on a staggered basis, with the three at-large seats (and the mayoral seat) up for election together and the three ward seats coming up for election two years later and no election in the middle year of the three-year cycle. Bloomfield's charter retains most of the characteristics of the Town form, with additional powers delegated to an administrator.

As of 2026, the Mayor of Bloomfield is Democrat Jenny Mundell, whose term of office ends December 31, 2028. Members of the Bloomfield Township Council are Sarah Cruz (D, 2026; Third Ward), Jill Fischman (D, 2028; at-large), Rosalee Gonzalez (D, 2026; First Ward, elected to serve an unexpired term), Nicholas Joanow (D, 2026; Second Ward), Monica Charris Tabares (D, 2028; at-large) and Tracy Toler-Phillips (D, 2028; at-lage).

In December 2024, the township council appointed Rosalee Gonzalez to fill the first ward seat expiring in December 2026 that became vacant when Jenny Mundell took office as mayor and named Widney Polynice to fill the at-large seat expiring in December 2026 that became vacant when Richard Rockwell stepped down from office. Gonzalez served on an interim basis until the November 2025 general election, when voters chose her to fill the balance of the term of office.

The Township Council appointed Ted Gamble to serve as mayor in January 2024 to fill the seat vacated by Michael Venezia when he took office in the New Jersey General Assembly; Gamble will serve on an interim basis until the November 2024 general election, when voters will choose a candidate to serve the balance of the term of office. In February 2024, Monica Charris Tabares was chosen to fill the at-large seat expiring in December 2025 that had been held by Ted Gamble; she will be sworn into office on February 24 and will serve on an interim basis until the November 2024 election. In the November 2024 general election, Jenny Mundell was chosen to serve the balance of the term as mayor and Tabares was chosen to serve the balance of the at-large term.

In January 2018, the Township Council selected Richard Rockwell from a list of three candidates nominated by the Democratic municipal committee to fill the at-large seat expiring in December 2019 that had been vacated the previous month by Carlos Pomares who resigned from office to serve on the Essex County Board of Chosen Freeholders. Rockwell served on an interim basis until the November 2018 general election, when he was elected to serve the balance of the term of office.

The Township Council selected Jenny Mundell to fill the vacant First Ward seat expiring in December 2017 that had been held by Elias N. Chalet until he resigned from office after being charged with accepting $15,000 in bribes in exchange for making sure that the township would proceed with the acquisition of a commercial property. After pleading guilty, Chalet was forced to resign from office and could be sentenced to five years in prison.

==== Emergency services ====
The township maintains its own police department.

The town is protected by a fire department consisting of 78 active professional firefighters who operate out of four stations, 24 hours a day, 7 days a week. There is also a squad of volunteers. In 2009, the department received international accreditation. The Fire Prevention Bureau established in 1953 and described as the first of its kind in the state, is operated by the department. It consists of one fire inspector, one fire official and a small support staff of civilians and fire personnel. The department apparatus consist of four engines (one is a rescue pumper), one Truck/Ladder, a rescue and three reserve apparatus. Engine 1 located at the fire headquarters frequently closes due to lack of manpower.

In 2018, the Insurance Services Office once again listed the fire department as a class 2 agency, recognizing it in the top five percent of the nation's fire departments, a ranking it had held for the ten previous years. As of 2020, the department is again working toward achieving accreditation status.

The Fire Chief is Louis Venezia. He is the brother of former mayor, Michael Venezia.

=== Federal, state, and county representation ===
Bloomfield is in the 11th Congressional district and is part of New Jersey's 34th state legislative district.

Before the redistricting that followed the 2020 census, the township had been split between the 10th and 11th Congressional districts In the redistricting that went into effect in 2013, 24,480 residents in the northern portion of the township were placed in the 10th District, while 22,835 in the southern section were placed in the 11th District. Prior to the 2010 Census, Bloomfield had been part of the 8th Congressional District, a change made by the New Jersey Redistricting Commission that took effect in January 2013, based on the results of the November 2012 general elections.

For the 119th United States Congress, New Jersey's 11th congressional district is represented by Analilia Mejia (D, Glen Ridge) who was elected in a 2026 special election to serve for the remainder of the Congress following the resignation Mikie Sherrill (D, Montclair), who was elected Governor of New Jersey in 2025. New Jersey is represented in the United States Senate by Democrats Cory Booker (Newark, term ends 2027) and Andy Kim (Moorestown, term ends 2031).

For the 2026–2027 session, the 34th legislative district of the New Jersey Legislature is represented in the State Senate by Britnee Timberlake (D, East Orange) and in the General Assembly by Carmen Morales (D, Belleville) and Michael Venezia (D, Bloomfield).

Essex County is governed by a directly elected county executive, with legislative functions performed by the Board of County Commissioners. As of 2025, the County Executive is Joseph N. DiVincenzo Jr. (D, Roseland), whose four-year term of office ends December 31, 2026. The county's Board of County Commissioners is composed of nine members, five of whom are elected from districts and four of whom are elected on an at-large basis. They are elected for three-year concurrent terms and may be re-elected to successive terms at the annual election in November. Essex County's Commissioners are:

Robert Mercado (D, District 1 – Newark's North and East Wards, parts of Central and West Wards; Newark, 2026), A'Dorian Murray-Thomas (D, District 2 – Irvington, Maplewood and parts of Newark's South and West Wards; Newark, 2026), Vice President Tyshammie L. Cooper (D, District 3 - Newark: West and Central Wards; East Orange, Orange and South Orange; East Orange, 2026), Leonard M. Luciano (D, District 4 – Caldwell, Cedar Grove, Essex Fells, Fairfield, Livingston, Millburn, North Caldwell, Roseland, Verona, West Caldwell and West Orange; West Caldwell, 2026), President Carlos M. Pomares (D, District 5 – Belleville, Bloomfield, Glen Ridge, Montclair and Nutley; Bloomfield, 2026), Brendan W. Gill (D, at large; Montclair, 2026), Romaine Graham (D, at large; Irvington, 2026), Wayne Richardson (D, at large; Newark, 2026), Patricia Sebold (D, at-large; Livingston, 2026).

Constitutional officers elected countywide are: Clerk Christopher J. Durkin (D, West Caldwell, 2025), Register of Deeds Juan M. Rivera Jr. (D, Newark, 2029), Sheriff Amir Jones (D, Newark, 2027), and Surrogate Alturrick Kenney (D, Newark, 2028).

=== Politics ===
As of March 2011, there were a total of 28,398 registered voters in Bloomfield, of which 11,925 (42.0%) were registered as Democrats, 4,393 (15.5%) were registered as Republicans and 12,061 (42.5%) were registered as Unaffiliated. There were 19 voters registered as either Libertarians or Greens.

United States presidential election results for Bloomfield
Year	Republican		Democratic		Third party(ies)	
Year	No.	%	No.	%	No.	%
2024	7,308	30.68%	15,990	67.13%	521	2.19%
2020	6,814	26.72%	18,375	72.04%	316	1.24%
2016	5,934	27.78%	14,762	69.10%	668	3.13%
2012	5,501	28.79%	13,361	69.93%	245	1.28%
2008	7,154	35.64%	12,735	63.44%	186	0.93%
2004	7,891	41.69%	10,829	57.21%	208	1.10%

In the 2012 presidential election, Democrat Barack Obama received 69.9% of the vote (13,361 cast), ahead of Republican Mitt Romney with 28.8% (5,501 votes), and other candidates with 1.3% (245 votes), among the 19,242 ballots cast by the township's 29,923 registered voters (135 ballots were spoiled), for a turnout of 64.3%. In the 2008 presidential election, Democrat Barack Obama received 62.9% of the vote here (12,735 cast), ahead of Republican John McCain with 35.3% (7,154 votes) and other candidates with 0.9% (186 votes), among the 20,251 ballots cast by the township's 27,981 registered voters, for a turnout of 72.4%. In the 2004 presidential election, Democrat John Kerry received 57.0% of the vote here (10,829 ballots cast), outpolling Republican George W. Bush with 41.5% (7,891 votes) and other candidates with 0.7% (208 votes), among the 19,012 ballots cast by the township's 27,995 registered voters, for a turnout percentage of 67.9.

Gubernatorial election results for Bloomfield
Year	Republican		Democratic		Third party(ies)	
Year	No.	%	No.	%	No.	%
2025	4,461	23.75%	14,207	75.63%	117	0.62%
2021	3,638	29.00%	8,809	70.22%	98	0.78%
2017	2,395	23.64%	7,341	72.47%	394	3.89%
2013	4,984	45.59%	5,808	53.12%	141	1.29%
2009	4,359	37.88%	6,241	54.23%	908	7.89%
2005	4,266	37.55%	6,718	59.13%	378	3.33%

In the 2013 gubernatorial election, Democrat Barbara Buono received 53.1% of the vote (5,808 cast), ahead of Republican Chris Christie with 45.6% (4,984 votes), and other candidates with 1.3% (141 votes), among the 11,118 ballots cast by the township's 30,606 registered voters (185 ballots were spoiled), for a turnout of 36.3%. In the 2009 gubernatorial election, Democrat Jon Corzine received 53.8% of the vote here (6,241 ballots cast), ahead of Republican Chris Christie with 37.6% (4,359 votes), Independent Chris Daggett with 6.6% (761 votes) and other candidates with 1.3% (147 votes), among the 11,599 ballots cast by the township's 27,929 registered voters, yielding a 41.5% turnout.

United States Senate election results for Bloomfield1
Year	Republican		Democratic		Third party(ies)	
Year	No.	%	No.	%	No.	%
2024	6,325	27.68%	15,762	68.98%	763	3.34%
2018	3,826	25.34%	10,729	71.05%	546	3.62%
2012	4,711	27.42%	12,057	70.17%	414	2.41%
2006	3,989	37.40%	6,465	60.61%	213	2.00%

United States Senate election results for Bloomfield2
Year	Republican		Democratic		Third party(ies)	
Year	No.	%	No.	%	No.	%
2020	6,205	25.04%	18,082	72.96%	498	2.01%
2014	2,466	28.75%	5,962	69.51%	149	1.74%
2013	2,002	29.55%	4,708	69.48%	66	0.97%
2008	5,853	34.10%	10,973	63.92%	340	1.98%

== Education ==
=== Primary and secondary schools ===
==== Public schools ====
The Bloomfield Public Schools serve students in pre-kindergarten through twelfth grade. As of the 2021–22 school year, the district, comprised of 11 schools, had an enrollment of 6,191 students and 538.5 classroom teachers (on an FTE basis), for a student–teacher ratio of 11.5:1. Schools in the district (with 2021–22 enrollment data from the National Center for Education Statistics) are Early Childhood Center at Forest Glen (165 students; in grade PreK), Berkeley Elementary School (446; K-6), Brookdale Elementary School (320; K-6), Carteret Elementary School (375; K-6), Demarest Elementary School (480; K-6), Fairview Elementary School (452; PreK-6), Franklin Elementary School (343; K-6), Oak View Elementary School (314; PreK-6), Watsessing Elementary School (270; K-6), Bloomfield Middle School (971; 7-8) and Bloomfield High School / Bridges Academy (1,986; 9-12).

As of the 2012–13 school year, the Bloomfield Public Schools had an actual Budgetary Per Pupil Cost of $11,848 (16.4% below the statewide group average of $14,173), while Total Spending Per Pupil for the district was $15,848 (16.0% below the $18,867 statewide).

Bloomfield Tech High School is a regional, countywide magnet public high school that offers occupational and academic instruction for students in Essex County, as part of the Essex County Vocational Technical Schools.

==== Catholic schools ====
Saint Thomas the Apostle Parish School, which serves grades K–8, is operated under the supervision of the Roman Catholic Archdiocese of Newark.

=== Colleges and universities ===
Bloomfield College, a liberal arts college founded in 1868, is in downtown Bloomfield near the town green. The college has approximately 2,000 students and is affiliated with the Presbyterian Church.

== Transportation ==
=== Roads and highways ===
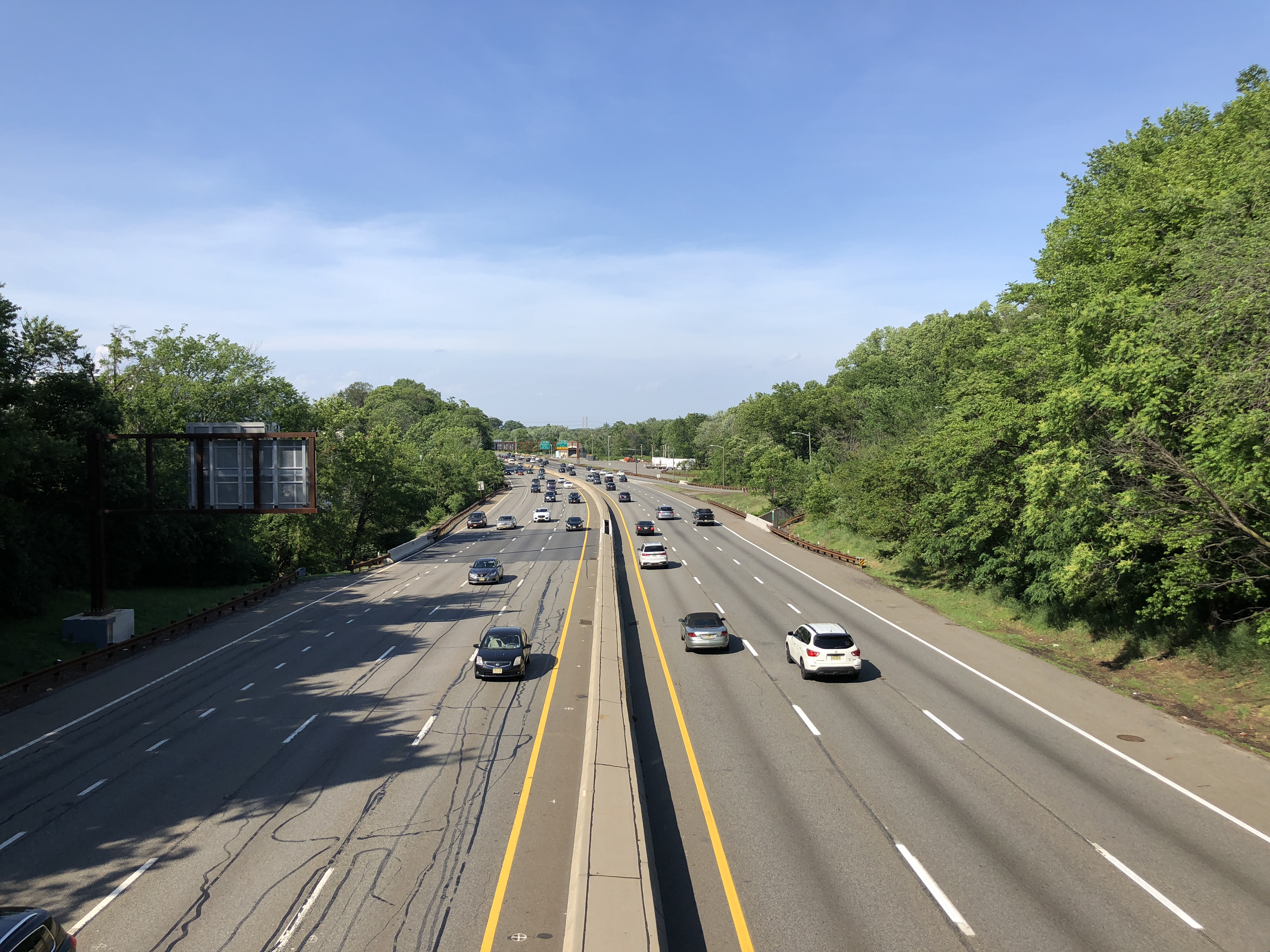
View north along the Garden State Parkway in Bloomfield

As of May 2010, the township had a total of 95.39 miles (153.52 km) of roadways, of which 77.39 miles (124.55 km) were maintained by the municipality, 13.77 miles (22.16 km) by Essex County and 4.23 miles (6.81 km) by the New Jersey Turnpike Authority.

The major New Jersey highway artery that serves Bloomfield is the Garden State Parkway, the longest road in the state. It has four interchanges in the township. Interchanges 148 in the south of Bloomfield and 151 in the north are complete interchanges, while 149 and 150 are partials. The Parkway's Essex toll plaza is southbound just south of interchange 150 in the township. There are two service areas on the Parkway in Bloomfield, one for northbound and one southbound. Troop D of the New Jersey State Police, which patrols the full length of the Garden State Parkway, has a station in Bloomfield at northbound milepost 153.

County Road 506, 506 Spur and 509 also serve Bloomfield.

=== Commuter rail ===
South Bloomfield is served by two stations of the NJ Transit Montclair-Boonton Line to Hoboken Terminal or to New York Penn Station in Midtown Manhattan via the Secaucus Junction. About 55% of the weekday trains terminate in Penn Station via Midtown Direct. On weekends the line terminates in Hoboken. The Bloomfield train station is located off of Bloomfield Avenue in the downtown area. The Watsessing Avenue station is at the corner of Watsessing Avenue and Orange Street, and is located below ground.

Bloomfield used to be served by other passenger rail lines. The Rowe Street station was served by the Boonton Line until September 2002, when it was closed as part of the addition of Midtown Direct service to the township. The Walnut Street station, on the same line, was closed in 1953 when the Garden State Parkway was built through it.

=== Light rail ===
The Grove Street station on the Newark City Subway line of the Newark Light Rail at the south end of Bloomfield provides service to Newark Penn Station, created as part of an extension to Belleville and Bloomfield that opened in 2002. This station was part of the Orange Branch of the New York & Greenwood Lake Line of the Erie-Lackawanna Railroad with service to Jersey City which last saw passenger service in 1965. Freight service was discontinued in 2010 by Norfolk Southern with the loss of the last remaining shipper Hartz Mountain.

=== Buses ===
NJ Transit bus service is available to and from Newark on the 11, 27, 28, 29, 34, 72, 90, 92, 93 and 94 routes, with local service on the 709 bus line. Service to Port Authority Bus Terminal is provided by route 102. In October 2009, the Go Bus 28 route was introduced, offering service nearly all day from Bloomfield Train Station to Newark Liberty International Airport.

=== Airports ===
Bloomfield is 7.5 miles (12.1 km) from Newark Liberty International Airport in Newark / Elizabeth, and 28.8 miles (46.3 km) from LaGuardia Airport in Flushing, Queens.

== Points of interest ==
- Glendale Cemetery
- Holsten's Brookdale Confectionery, filming location of the final scene in the final episode of The Sopranos.
- The Oakes Estate, constructed in 1895 based on a design by Charles Granville Jones, was added to the National Register of Historic Places in 1981.

== Notable events ==
In 1942, the Westinghouse Lamp Plant in Bloomfield produced the majority of uranium metal used in the Chicago Pile-1, the world's first self-sustaining chain reaction which was a critical early phase of the Manhattan Project to create the first atomic bomb.

On January 29, 2023, at 3 a.m. a person in a ski mask threw a lit Molotov cocktail at Temple Ner Tamid, in an apparent attempt to burn down the synagogue that was unsuccessful, with no damage done to the building. On February 1, a 26-year-old man was arrested and charged with one federal count of "attempted use of fire to damage a building", which could result in 20 years in jail and a fine of up to $250,000 if he is convicted of the crime.

== Notable people ==
People who were born in, residents of, or otherwise closely associated with Bloomfield include:

- Alaa Abdelnaby (born 1968), former NBA basketball player
- James Avati (1912–2005), illustrator and paperback cover artist
- Fallah Bahh (born 1985 as Francis Flores), professional wrestler signed with Impact Wrestling
- Caleb Cook Baldwin (1820–1911), one of the first Presbyterian missionaries to Fuzhou (then Foochow), China
- Arthur Hornbui Bell (1891–1973), Ku Klux Klan leader in New Jersey in the 1920s
- Seth Bingham (1882–1972), organist and prolific composer
- Robert Birmelin (born 1933), figurative painter, printmaker and draughtsman
- William D. Bishop (1827–1904), member of the United States House of Representatives from Connecticut's 4th congressional district from 1857 to 1859
- Elizabeth Blackwell (1821–1910), first woman doctor
- Hank Borowy (1916–2004), Major League Baseball All-Star pitcher who played for the New York Yankees, Chicago Cubs, Philadelphia Phillies, Pittsburgh Pirates and Detroit Tigers
- Randolph Bourne (1886–1918), radical writer and opponent of U.S. involvement in World War I
- William Batchelder Bradbury (1816–1868), composer of the tune to "Jesus Loves Me" and many other popular hymns
- Doug Brien (born 1970), placekicker who played for the New York Jets and six other teams in his 12-season NFL career
- Kevin Burkhardt (born 1974), sportscaster who is a play-by-play voices for the NFL on FOX and a reporter with SportsNet New York, who is the field reporter during New York Mets telecasts
- Walter Bustamante, soccer player
- Thomas Cadmus (1736–1821), businessman, Revolutionary War officer and community leader
- Marco Capozzoli (born 1988), placekicker who has played in the Arena Football League for the Jacksonville Sharks
- Lou Carter (1918–2005), jazz pianist, composer, and songwriter
- Bill Clarken (1903–1951), football player and coach, who played in the National Football League for the Orange Tornadoes, despite never playing collegiate football
- William F. Conger (1844–1918), businessman and politician who served as a member of the Wisconsin State Senate
- Rajie Cook (1930–2021), graphic designer, photographer and artist
- Marion Crecco (1930–2015), member of the New Jersey General Assembly from 1986 to 2002
- Tom Cudworth (born 1964), screenwriter
- Peter David (born 1956), science fiction and fantasy author known for his work in comic books and Star Trek novels
- Frank Howard Dodd (1844–1916), publisher
- Charles Warren Eaton (1857–1937), artist best known for his tonalist landscapes who lived in Bloomfield from 1888 until his death in 1937
- Todd Edwards (born 1972), house music and UK Garage producer, an early pioneer of the genre of UK Garage
- Bud Ellor (1905–1932), professional football player who spent one season in the National Football League in 1930, playing with the Newark Tornadoes
- Bento Estrela (born 2006), professional footballer who plays as a midfielder for Major League Soccer club New York Red Bulls.
- Alex Ferguson (1897–1976), pitcher in Major League Baseball who played for five different teams between 1918 and 1929
- Tom Fleming (1951–2017), long-distance runner and two-time winner of the New York City Marathon
- Connie Francis (born 1937), singer
- Bill Geyer (1919–2004), halfback who played for three seasons for the Chicago Bears
- Johnny Gibson (1905–2006), Olympic runner
- Michael Giuliano (1915–1976), politician who served two terms in the New Jersey Senate
- Malachi Goodman, American football offensive tackle for the Penn State Nittany Lions
- Roger Lee Hall (born 1942), composer and musicologist
- Ernie Hambacher (1906–1990), American football fullback who played in the NFL for the Orange Tornadoes
- Merton Hanks (born 1968), former NFL safety who played for the San Francisco 49ers and has been the NFL's Vice President of Operations
- Larry Hesterfer (1878–1943), pitcher who played a single MLB game in 1901 with the New York Giants, in which he became the only player known to have hit into a triple play in his first major league at bat
- Benjamin Holman (1930–2007), pioneering newspaper and television reporter who was one of the nation's few prominent black journalists
- Jim Kelly (1884–1961), MLB outfielder
- Charles Kinsey (1773–1849), U.S. Representative from New Jersey
- Michael Knapp (born 2000), professional soccer player who plays as a midfielder for USL Championship club New York Red Bulls II
- Mike Kochel (1916–1994), one of the seven blocks of granite at Fordham University, he played in the NFL for the Chicago Cardinals
- Andy Kostecka (1921–2007), professional basketball player who played for the Indianapolis Jets
- Ted Leo (born 1970), punk rock singer, songwriter and guitarist
- Donna Leon (born 1942), author of a series of crime novels set in Venice, Italy
- Bob Ley (born 1955), ESPN sportscaster
- Michael Maslin, cartoonist for The New Yorker
- Keven McDonald (born 1956), basketball player who is best known for his collegiate career at the University of Pennsylvania from 1974 to 1978 with the Penn Quakers men's basketball team
- Edward Page Mitchell (1852–1927), editorial and short story writer for The Sun
- R. Stevie Moore (born 1952), lo-fi music singer/songwriter
- Charles A. Morris (1853–1914), engineer and dredging inventor
- Clayton Parros (born 1990), track and field sprinter who specializes in the 400-meter dash
- Robert A. Pascal (1934–2021), politician who served as County executive of Anne Arundel County, Maryland from 1975 to 1982
- Marion Post Wolcott (1910–1990), photographer who worked for the Farm Security Administration during the Depression
- Charlie Puleo (born 1955), retired Major League Baseball pitcher who played from 1981 to 1989 with the New York Mets, Cincinnati Reds and Atlanta Braves
- Philip Reilly (born 1952), fencer who competed in the team sabre event at the 1984 Summer Olympics
- Andrew J. Robinson (c. 1843–1922), builder in New York City
- Jack Robinson (1921–2000), professional baseball pitcher whose MLB career consisted of three games played in the Major Leagues for the Boston Red Sox in 1949
- Michael A. Saporito (born 1962), American Catholic prelate who was appointed as Bishop of Metuchen in 2026
- Don Savage (1919–1961), Major League Baseball player for the New York Yankees in 1944 and 1945
- Mark Sceurman, graphic artist who is co-creator and publisher of Weird NJ magazine
- Anish Shroff (born 1982), Play-by-Play Announcer ESPN Carolina Panthers
- Thomas S. Smith (1917–2002), politician who served in the New Jersey General Assembly from 1992 until his death.
- Kristjan Sokoli (born 1991), American football defensive end
- Robert Stempel (1933–2011), Chairman and CEO of General Motors
- Frank Tripucka (1927–2013), quarterback who played for the Denver Broncos
- Kelly Tripucka (born 1959), pro basketball player for several teams, including the New Jersey Nets and New York Knicks The Tripuckas are father and son, and both played their sports at the University of Notre Dame.
- Todd Tripucka (born 1954), former basketball player
- Marlene VerPlanck (1933–2018), jazz and pop vocalist whose body of work centered on big band jazz, the American songbook and cabaret
- Michael Venezia, politician who had been mayor of Bloomfield before taking office in 2024 in the New Jersey General Assembly
- E. Duke Vincent (1932–2024), television producer and former naval aviator who was a member of the Blue Angels flying team
- Alexander Wilson (1766–1813), the Father of American Ornithology, lived in Bloomfield for several months in 1801, where he was employed as a schoolteacher
- Dick Zimmer (born 1944), former member of the United States House of Representatives who was the Republican candidate for United States Senate in 1996 and 2008
