= Brookdale, New Jersey =

Populated place in Essex County, New Jersey, US

- Census-designated place
- CR 509 (Broad Street) through Brookdale

- Location in Essex County and the state of New Jersey.

- Location in Essex County Location in New Jersey Location in the United States
- Coordinates: 40.834945°N 74.179777°W
- Country: United States
- State: New Jersey
- County: Essex
- Township: Bloomfield

Area
  - Total: 1.61 sq mi (4.17 km^{2})
  - Land: 1.60 sq mi (4.15 km^{2})
  - Water: 0.0077 sq mi (0.02 km^{2}) 0.26%
- Elevation: 177 ft (54 m)

Population (2020)
  - Total: 9,854
  - Density: 6,148.5/sq mi (2,373.95/km^{2})
- Time zone: UTC−05:00 (Eastern (EST))
  - Summer (DST): UTC−04:00 (EDT)
- ZIP Code: 07003 - Bloomfield
- FIPS code: 34-08110
- GNIS feature ID: 02583975

Brookdale is an unincorporated community and census-designated place (CDP) located in Bloomfield Township, located within Essex County, in the U.S. state of New Jersey. It is generally considered to be the part of Bloomfield north of Bay Avenue. As of the 2020 United States census, the CDP's total population was 9,854, an increase of 615 (+6.7%) from the 9,239 counted in the 2010 census.

== History ==
The original English name of Brookdale was Stone House Plains. "Stone House" referred to a rock formation known as the stone house or great rock, supposedly once suitable as a shelter, just north of the present-day intersection of Bellevue Avenue and Newell Drive. The rock was still present in 1802 but was removed not long afterward. "Plains" referred to the plains of the segment of the Yantecaw River which passes through the area.

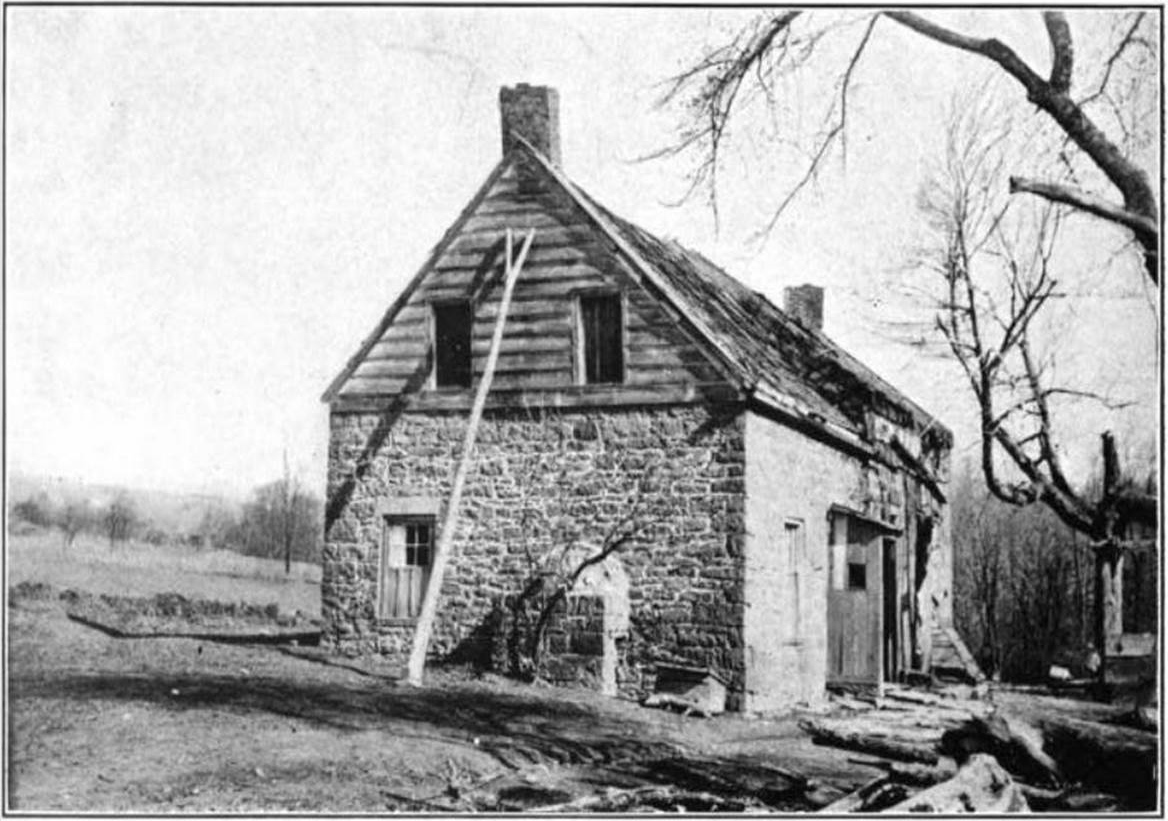
Early farmhouse in Brookdale/Stone House Plains

Within a decade or so of the turn of the 18th century, settlers, possibly including Abraham Van Giesen, had begun to populate the area along Bellevue Avenue. By about 1750, two brothers, Garrabrant and Teunis Garrabrant, born in 1723 and 1726, respectively, to Cornelius and Jannetje (Pier) Gerbrandsen in Bergen (now Jersey City), owned sizeable tracts in the vicinity of Brookdale Park, Bellevue Avenue, and Broad Street. Circa 1730, Alexander Cockefair, born about 1696 in Bushwick, purchased a "plantation" roughly bounded by the Yantacaw Brook, and modern-day Broad Street and Watchung Avenue. The Sigler and Coeyman families also had very early farms in Stone House Plains. Descendants of these families operated farms, mills, and other businesses in the area for over two centuries.

Dutch was the primary language for many residents through the 18th century. In 1795, the Dutch Reformed Church of Stone House Plains (now Brookdale Reformed Church) was formed, creating a spiritual and social focal point for the community. The original church edifice was built in 1802; it burned and was rebuilt about 1857. The Morris family, which operated mills just south of Brookdale, made a mill pond on the Yantacaw Brook. In the mid-1800s, residents established the first school. In 1873, on the eve of US mail delivery service, the community voted to change the name to Brookdale.

After World War I, much of the farmland was developed into residential housing. The Clark Thread Company bought the Morris Pond (now Clark's Pond) and built an adjoining thread-coloring factory, later occupied by the Scientific Glass Company. Portions of the Cockefair farm were converted into a golf course and a junior high school (now Bloomfield Middle School). Essex County acquired and built Brookdale Park. In 1968, the petrochemical engineering firm Lummus Company set up in northern Brookdale.

== Geography ==
According to the United States Census Bureau, the CDP had a total area of 1.607 square miles (4.163 km^{2}), including 1.603 square miles (4.152 km^{2}) of land and 0.004 square miles (0.011 km^{2}) of water (0.26%).

== Demographics ==
Historical population
Census	Pop.	Note	%±
2010	9,239		—
2020	9,854		6.7%
Population sources: 2010 2020

Brookdale first appeared as a census designated place in the 2010 U.S. census formed from part of the deleted whole-township Bloomfield CDP.

=== Racial and ethnic composition ===
Brookdale CDP, New Jersey – Racial and ethnic composition Note: the US Census treats Hispanic/Latino as an ethnic category. This table excludes Latinos from the racial categories and assigns them to a separate category. Hispanics/Latinos may be of any race.
Race / Ethnicity (NH = Non-Hispanic)	Pop 2010	Pop 2020	% 2010	% 2020
White alone (NH)	6,415	5,638	69.43%	57.22%
Black or African American alone (NH)	409	643	4.43%	6.53%
Native American or Alaska Native alone (NH)	4	7	0.04%	0.07%
Asian alone (NH)	1,121	1,240	12.13%	12.58%
Native Hawaiian or Pacific Islander alone (NH)	2	0	0.02%	0.00%
Other race alone (NH)	32	113	0.35%	1.15%
Mixed race or Multiracial (NH)	171	397	1.85%	4.03%
Hispanic or Latino (any race)	1,085	1,816	11.74%	18.43%
Total	9,239	9,854	100.00%	100.00%

=== 2020 census ===
As of the 2020 census, Brookdale had a population of 9,854. The median age was 40.9 years. 22.4% of residents were under the age of 18 and 16.7% were 65 years of age or older. For every 100 females, there were 94.8 males, and for every 100 females age 18 and over, there were 90.6 males.

100.0% of residents lived in urban areas, while 0.0% lived in rural areas.

There were 3,546 households, of which 37.2% had children under the age of 18 living in them. Of all households, 61.7% were married-couple households, 10.8% were households with a male householder and no spouse or partner present, and 22.1% were households with a female householder and no spouse or partner present. About 17.7% of all households were made up of individuals, and 8.0% had someone living alone who was 65 years of age or older.

There were 3,635 housing units, of which 2.4% were vacant. The homeowner vacancy rate was 0.8% and the rental vacancy rate was 3.5%.

=== 2010 census ===
The 2010 United States census counted 9,239 people, 3,445 households, and 2,580 families in the CDP. The population density was 5,763.0 per square mile (2,225.1/km^{2}). There were 3,583 housing units at an average density of 2,234.9 per square mile (862.9/km^{2}). The racial makeup was 76.46% (7,064) White, 4.96% (458) Black or African American, 0.11% (10) Native American, 12.25% (1,132) Asian, 0.02% (2) Pacific Islander, 3.00% (277) from other races, and 3.20% (296) from two or more races. Hispanic or Latino of any race were 11.74% (1,085) of the population.

Of the 3,445 households, 32.3% had children under the age of 18; 62.1% were married couples living together; 10.0% had a female householder with no husband present and 25.1% were non-families. Of all households, 20.1% were made up of individuals and 9.2% had someone living alone who was 65 years of age or older. The average household size was 2.68 and the average family size was 3.13.

21.9% of the population were under the age of 18, 6.0% from 18 to 24, 27.4% from 25 to 44, 29.5% from 45 to 64, and 15.2% who were 65 years of age or older. The median age was 41.6 years. For every 100 females, the population had 89.2 males. For every 100 females ages 18 and older there were 87.0 males.
