= Bloomfield Police Department (New Jersey) =

- Abbreviation: BPD

Agency overview
- Employees: 122

Jurisdictional structure
- Operations jurisdiction: Bloomfield, New Jersey, USA
- Area: 5.328 square miles (13.80 km^{2})
- Population: 47,575
- General nature: Local civilian police

Operational structure
- Headquarters: Bloomfield, New Jersey
- Agency executive: James Behre, Chief of Police (Acting)

Website
- www.bloomfieldnjpd.com

The Bloomfield Police Department (BPD) is the primary law enforcement agency in Bloomfield, New Jersey. It consists of 122 police officers.

== Location ==
The department is headquartered in its own building at 1 Municipal Plaza.

== Organization ==
The department is administered through a number of divisions, bureaux and units.

- Chief's Office
- Communications Division
- Community Policing Unit
- Criminal Investigation Division
- Patrol Division
- Traffic Bureau
- Youth Aid Bureau
- Record Bureau

The officers of the department are represented in labor negotiations by Local 32 of the Police Benevolent Association.

== History ==
In July 2010, Officer Bruce Calkin required hospitalization after being injured in a fight in the department's parking lot with a fellow officer.

In December 2013, a number of police officers sued the department. They claimed they had been suspended because they were in the military reserves. The department in turn claimed the officers were falsely excusing their absences from work as being required by military service.

On 10 February 2014, Acting Police Chief James Behre publicly claimed a city councilman asked him to advance the careers of two particular policemen in exchange for support in becoming the permanent police chief. Two days later Behre was put on paid administrative leave pending a "fitness for duty" review.

=== Marcus Jeter ===
In 2012, Marcus Jeter was arrested for eluding police and resisting arrest and assault. In 2014, Jeter was cleared of all charges after his attorney filed a public records request and obtained a police dashcam video which the prosecution insisted was unobtainable. Bloomfield officers Orlando Trinidad and Sean Courter were charged with official misconduct, tampering with public records, and false documents and false swearing, while a third officer (Albert Sutterlin) was allowed to retire after pleading guilty to tampering with evidence. Trinidad and Courter were suspended without pay. In 2012, when the incident happened, the internal affairs department exonerated both officers. Trinidad maintained he was in the right, even though the footage shows otherwise. The mayor vowed to purge the police department of bad police officers after this incident

On January 13, 2015, Superior Court Judge Michael Ravin denied a motion to dismiss the charges against the officers. Under a plea deal offered by the prosecution, Trinidad and Courter would have to spend five years in state prison. In June 2015, the trial was postponed to resume October 5.

On November 5, 2015, the jury found Orlando Trinidad and Sean Courter guilty of official misconduct, conspiracy to commit official misconduct, tampering with public records, falsifying or tampering with records and false swearing. Orlando Trinidad was also found guilty of a lesser charge of simple assault. Both were sentenced to five years in state prison. Marcus Jeter received a $1.6 million settlement from the city for his false arrest and wrongful prosecution.
