= Ernie Hambacher =

American football player (1906–1990)

- Ernie Hambacher, 1944

Profile
- Position: Fullback

Personal information
- Born: December 12, 1906; Bloomfield, New Jersey
- Died: September 3, 1990 (aged 83); St. Petersburg, Florida
- Listed height: 5 ft 8 in (1.73 m)
- Listed weight: 170 lb (77 kg)

Career information
- High school: Bloomfield (NJ)
- College: Bucknell

Career history
- Orange Tornadoes (1929)

Career statistics
- Games: 3

Ernest Adam Hambacher (December 12, 1906 – September 3, 1990) was an American football player.

Hambacher was born in 1906 in Bloomfield, New Jersey, and attended Bloomfield High School. He gained acclaim as one of the best baseball players in the school's history. He also played at the shortstop and second base positions for the Long Branch Athletic Club. He was also captain of Bloomfield High's football team in 1925. In 1985, he was inducted into the Bloomfield Athletic Hall of Fame.

He played college football at Bucknell during the 1927 and 1928 seasons.

He played professional football in the National Football League (NFL) as a fullback for the Orange Tornadoes in 1929. He appeared in three NFL games, one as a starter.

After his football career ended, he worked as a component sprayer for EAI for 15 years and also worked for a time for the Prudential Life Insurance Company in New Jersey. During World War II, he enlisted in the Army Transport Service, serving in Europe during the war. He also served in the United States Merchant Marine. After the war, he lived in Long Branch, New Jersey, moving in approximately 1962 to Florida. He owned and operated Spraytone, Inc., in Fort Lauderdale, Florida, for 20 years. He moved to St. Petersburg, Florida, in 1989, and died there in 1990 at age 83.
