= Oakes Estate =

Historic house in New Jersey, United States

- U.S. National Register of Historic Places
- New Jersey Register of Historic Places
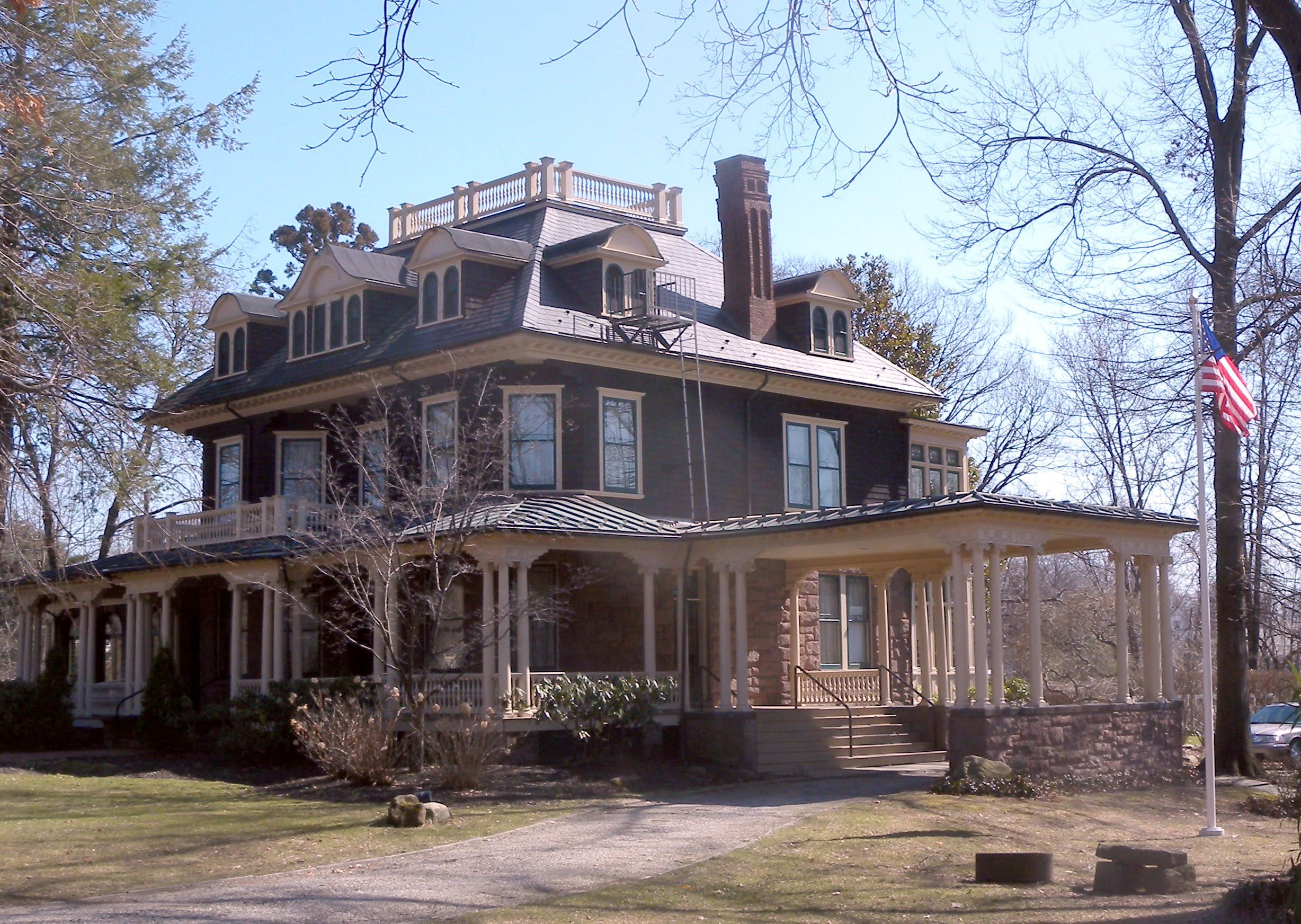

- Location within Essex County, New Jersey Location within New Jersey Location within the United States
- Location: 240 Belleville Avenue, Bloomfield, New Jersey
- Coordinates: 40°47′56″N 74°11′27″W
- Area: 2.7 acres (1.1 ha)
- Built: 1895
- Architects: Jones, Charles Granville
- Architectural style: Colonial Revival, Queen Anne
- NRHP reference No.: 81000390
- NJRHP No.: 1067

Significant dates
- Added to NRHP: August 6, 1981
- Designated NJRHP: June 17, 1981

The Oakes Estate is located in Bloomfield, Essex County, New Jersey, United States. The building, designed by Charles Granville Jones and built in 1895, was added to the National Register of Historic Places on August 6, 1981.

The home is featured in the screen adaptation of Harlan Coben's Shelter.

== See also ==
- National Register of Historic Places listings in Essex County, New Jersey
