= Kralyevich Productions =

American video production company based in New York City

Kralyevich Productions, Inc. (KPI TV) is an American video production company based in New York City.

The company has won two Primetime Emmy awards for its production of Rome: Engineering an Empire for the History Channel.

It has also produced Weird U.S., Only in America, Deep Sea Detectives, Xtreme Building and Lucha Libre: Life Behind the Mask.
