= Bloomfield Green Historic District =

Historic district in New Jersey, United States

- U.S. National Register of Historic Places
- U.S. Historic district
- New Jersey Register of Historic Places
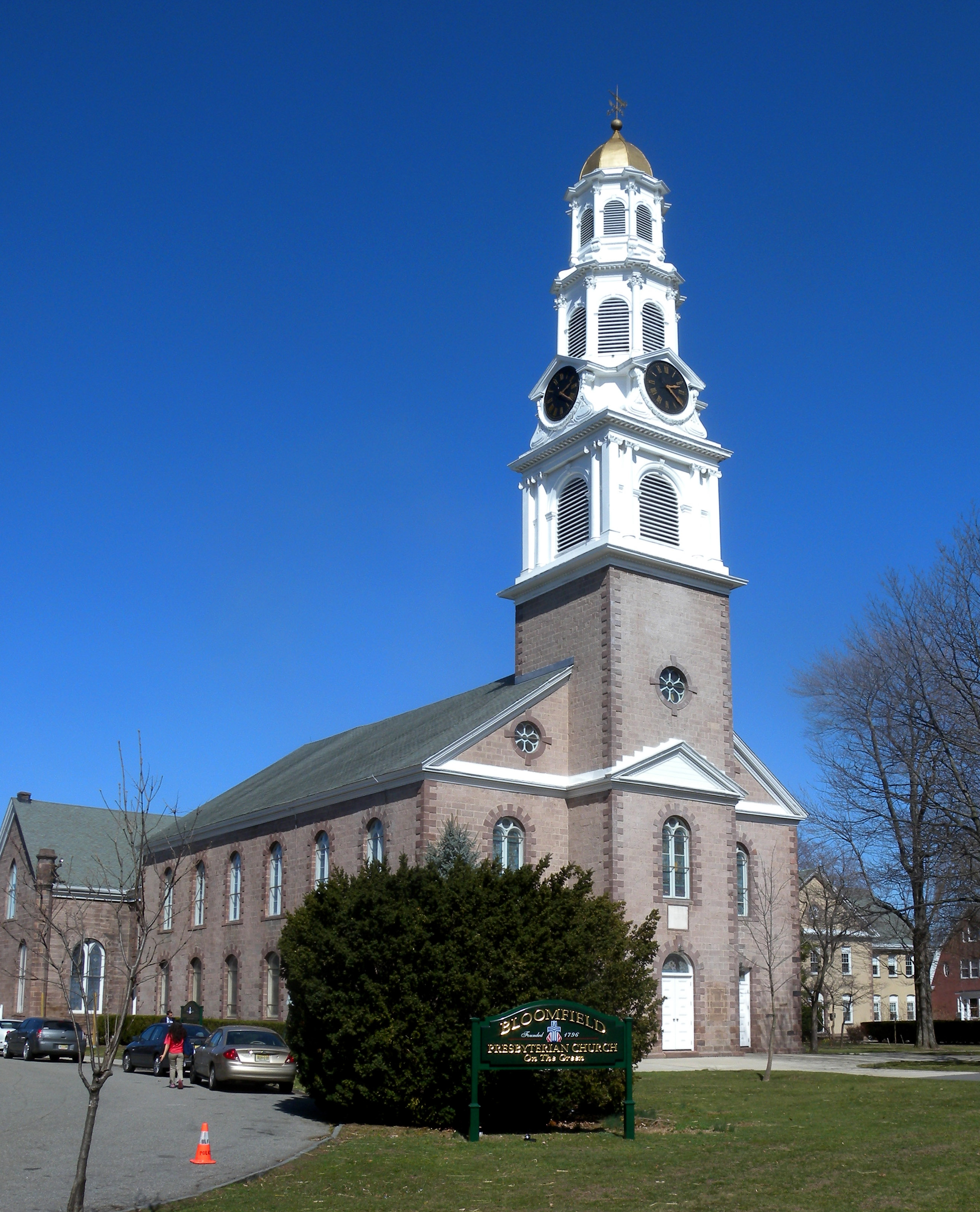
- Bloomfield Presbyterian Church

- Location within Essex County, New Jersey Location within New Jersey Location within the United States
- Location: Bounded by Belleville Avenue, Montgomery, Spruce, State, Liberty, and Franklin Streets; Bloomfield, New Jersey
- Coordinates: 40°47′48″N 74°11′44″W
- Area: 100 acres (40 ha)
- Built: 1797
- Architect: John F. Capen
- Architectural style: Greek Revival, Late Victorian, Gothic Revival
- NRHP reference No.: 78001757
- NJRHP No.: 1063

Significant dates
- Added to NRHP: April 20, 1978
- Designated NJRHP: October 12, 1977

The Bloomfield Green Historic District is a 100-acre (40 ha) historic district located in the township of Bloomfield in Essex County, New Jersey, United States. It encompasses Bloomfield Green, a 4-acre (1.6 ha) park. The district was added to the National Register of Historic Places on April 20, 1978, for its significance in architecture, community planning, education, military history, and religion. It has 181 contributing buildings, including several that are part of Bloomfield College.

== Description ==
Construction of the Bloomfield Presbyterian Church, the Church on the Green, started in 1797. It was designed by architect Samuel Ward with Federal architectural style and built using red sandstone. It was documented by the Historic American Buildings Survey (HABS) in 1936. The Church of the Sacred Heart, a Roman Catholic church, was built from 1890 to 1892. Designed by ecclesiastical architect Jeremiah O'Rourke and built with colored brick, it features Romanesque Revival style. The Westminster Presbyterian Church, built from 1890 to 1892, features Richardsonian Romanesque architecture. It is now the Westminster Art Center at Bloomfield College.

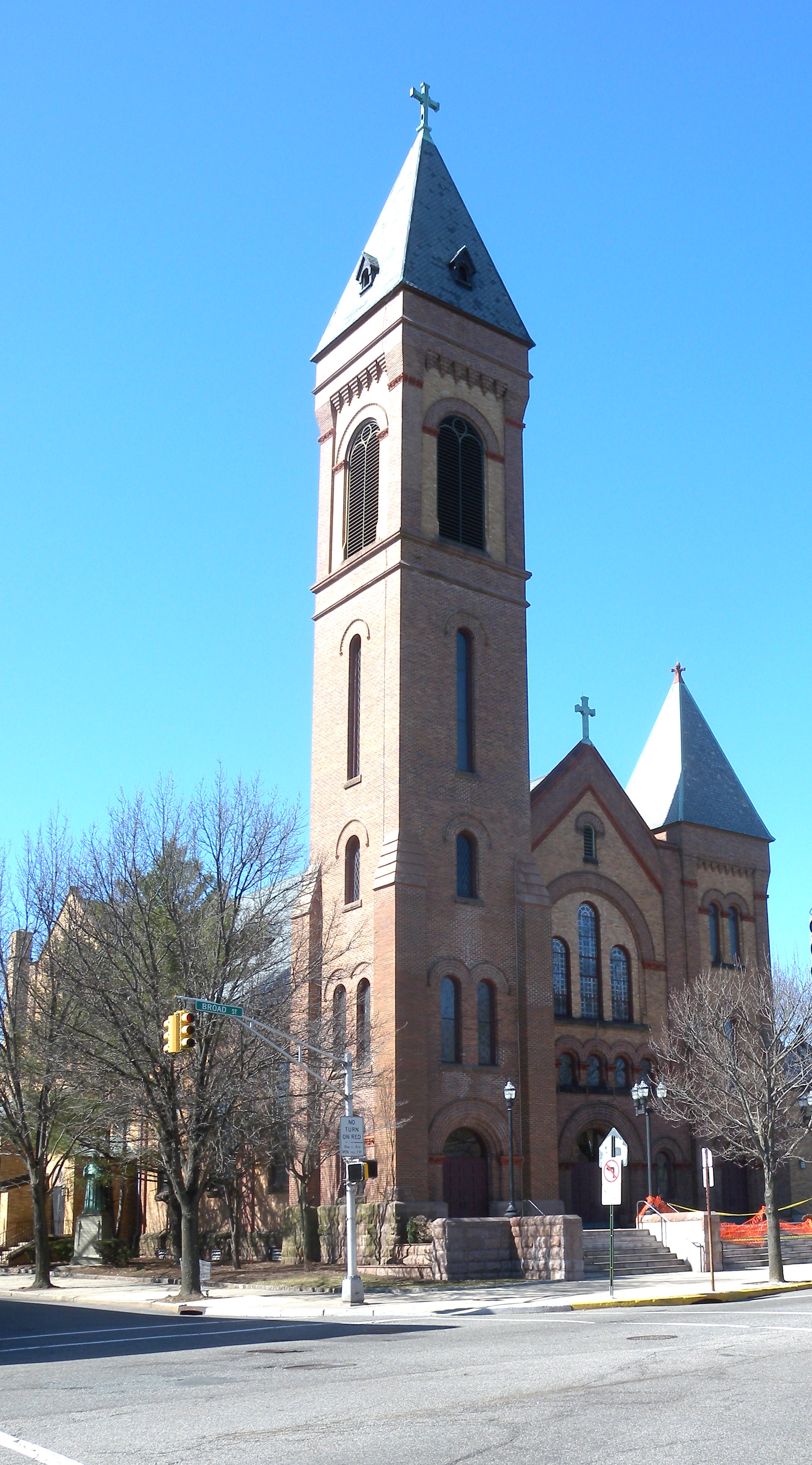
Church of the Sacred Heart

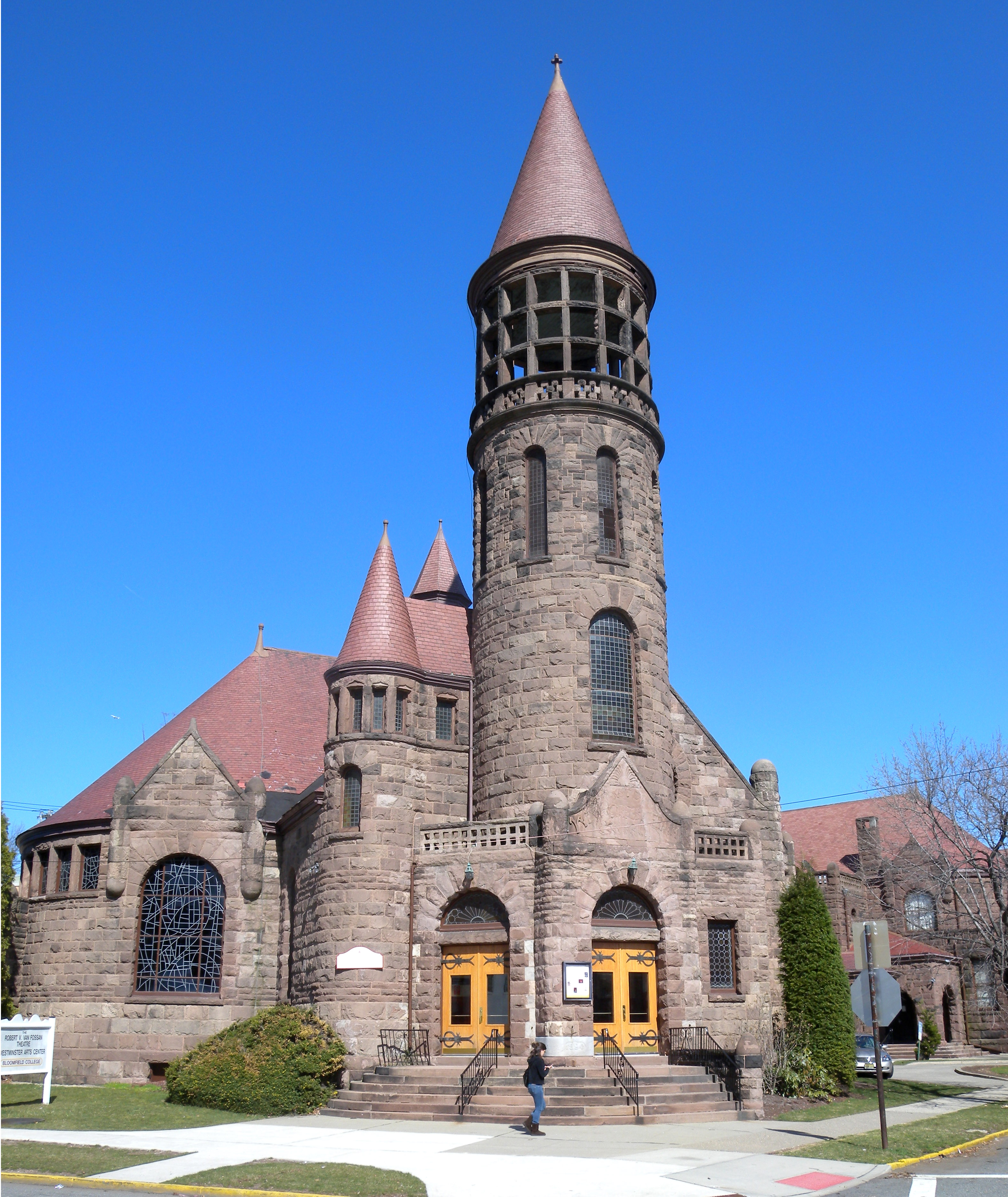
Westminster Presbyterian Church

== See also ==
- National Register of Historic Places listings in Essex County, New Jersey
