= Weird U.S. (TV series) =

- Starring: Mark Moran and Mark Sceurman
- Country of origin: United States

Production
- Executive producer: Carl H. Lindahl
- Running time: 60 minutes

Original release
- Network: The History Channel
- Release: October 31, 2004 (pilot); August 1, 2005 – December 30, 2005

Weird U.S. is a reality television series based on the book series of the same name. The program aired on the History Channel and starred Mark Moran and Mark Sceurman, founders of the magazine Weird NJ, as they hunt the United States looking for weird history, hauntings, and legends because, as they say, "history is full of weirdos." It is produced by Kralyevich Productions. It is also a series of paranormal travel guides edited by the same two individuals.

== History ==
The pilot episode aired on October 31, 2004, on the History Channel. The pilot episode was an hour long. It started as a regular weekly series on August 1, 2005. Under the Weird N.J. magazine branding, a VHS tape entitled “Weird N.J. Video Adventures: Greetings from Weird NJ” was released in 1999. The video is of a similar format to the later Weird US program.

== Series overview ==
| Season | Episodes | Originally released | |
| Season | Episodes | First released | Last released |
|---|---|---|---|
| Pilot | | October 31, 2004 | |
| 1 | 14 | August 1, 2005 | December 31, 2005 |

== Episodes ==
=== Pilot ===
| No. | Title | Original release date | U.S. viewers |
|---|---|---|---|
| 1 | "Weird U.S." "Strange but True" | October 31, 2004 | N/A |

=== Season 1 ===
| No. | Title | Original release date | U.S. viewers |
|---|---|---|---|
| 1 | "Road to Weirdsville" | August 1, 2005 | N/A |
| 2 | "Weird Medicine" | August 8, 2005 | N/A |
| 3 | "Weird Worship" | August 15, 2005 | N/A |
| 4 | "Rebels and Traitors" | August 22, 2005 | N/A |
| 5 | "Crimes and Punishment" | August 29, 2005 | N/A |
| 6 | "Weirdly Departed" | September 12, 2005 | N/A |
| 7 | "History or Hoax?" | September 26, 2005 | N/A |
| 8 | "Fact or Fiction" | 2005 | TBD |
| 9 | "Weird Underworld" | 2005 | TBD |
| 10 | "It's A Wonderful Time To Be Weird" | 2005 | TBD |
| 11 | "Creepy Curses" | 2005 | TBD |
| 12 | "Weird Waters" | 2005 | TBD |
| 13 | "Roadside Distractions" | 2005 | TBD |
| 14 | "This Odd House" | 2005 | TBD |

== DVD releases ==
A&E Home Video has released these DVD sets, along with other individual DVD episodes:

- Title: Weird U.S., Vol. 1 (History Channel)
- Episodes contained: Strange But True (pilot) and Road to Weirdsville
- UPC: 733961745122
- DVD Release Date: October 31, 2004
- Run Time: 90 minutes
- Title: Weird U.S., Vol. 2 (History Channel)
- Episodes contained: Weird Worship and Weirdly Departed
- UPC: 733961745139
- DVD Release Date: November 15, 2005
- Run Time: 90 minutes
- Title: Weird U.S., Vol. 3 (History Channel)
- Episodes contained: Rebels and Traitors and Crime and Punishment
- UPC: 733961745146
- DVD Release Date: February 28, 2006
- Run Time: 90 minutes
