= Bloomfield Public Schools =

School district in Essex County, New Jersey, US

Address
- 155 Broad Street Bloomfield, Essex County, New Jersey, 07003
- Coordinates: 40.799133°N 74.196779°W

District information
- Grades: PreK-12
- Superintendent: Salvatore Goncalves
- Business administrator: Hwey-Hwey "Vicky" Guo
- Schools: 11

Students and staff
- Enrollment: 6,191 (as of 2021–22)
- Faculty: 538.5 FTEs
- Student–teacher ratio: 11.5:1

Other information
- District Factor Group: DE
- Website: Official website
Ind.	Per pupil	District spending	Rank (*)	K-12 average	%± vs. average
1A	Total Spending	$15,848	12	$18,891	−16.1%
1	Budgetary Cost	12,281	10	14,783	−16.9%
2	Classroom Instruction	7,594	12	8,763	−13.3%
6	Support Services	1,426	5	2,392	−40.4%
8	Administrative Cost	1,682	87	1,485	13.3%
10	Operations & Maintenance	1,176	9	1,783	−34.0%
13	Extracurricular Activities	199	31	268	−25.7%
16	Median Teacher Salary	53,300	4	64,043
Data from NJDoE 2014 Taxpayers' Guide to Education Spending. *Of K-12 districts with more than 3,500 students. Lowest spending=1; Highest=103

The Bloomfield Public Schools are a comprehensive community public school district that serves students in pre-kindergarten through twelfth grade from Bloomfield, in Essex County, in the U.S. state of New Jersey.

As of the 2021–22 school year, the district, comprised of 11 schools, had an enrollment of 6,191 students and 538.5 classroom teachers (on an FTE basis), for a student–teacher ratio of 11.5:1.

== History ==
The original high school building, located on Broad Street, was completed in 1871 at a cost of $30,000 (equivalent to $790,000 in 2024). The current school building was built in 1911 as an extension of the original building.

The district had been classified by the New Jersey Department of Education as being in District Factor Group "DE", the fifth-highest of eight groupings. District Factor Groups organize districts statewide to allow comparison by common socioeconomic characteristics of the local districts. From lowest socioeconomic status to highest, the categories are A, B, CD, DE, FG, GH, I and J.

== Awards and recognition ==
During the 2007-08 school year, Oak View Elementary School was recognized with the National Blue Ribbon School Award of Excellence by the United States Department of Education, the highest award an American school can receive.

== Schools ==
Schools in the district (with 2021–22 enrollment data from the National Center for Education Statistics) are:

Early childhood

- Early Childhood Center at Forest Glen (165 students; in grade PreK)
  - Linda Colucci, principal

Elementary schools

- Berkeley Elementary School (446; K-6)
  - Natashia Baxter, principal
- Brookdale Elementary School (320; K-6)
  - Lauren Barton, principal
- Carteret Elementary School (375; K-6)
  - John Baltz, principal
- Demarest Elementary School (480; K-6)
  - Michael Sullivan, principal
- Fairview Elementary School (452; PreK-6)
  - Ginamarie Mignone, principal
- Franklin Elementary School (343; K-6)
  - Marianne Abbasso, principal
- Oak View Elementary School (314; PreK-6)
  - Michelle Fanning, interim principal
- Watsessing Elementary School (270; K-6)
  - Gina Rosamilia, principal

Middle school

- Bloomfield Middle School (971; 7-8)
  - Alla Vayda-Manzo, principal

High school

- Bloomfield High School / Bridges Academy (1,986; 9-12)
  - Christopher Jennings, principal

== Administration ==
Core members of the district's administration are:

- Salvatore Goncalves, superintendent of schools
- Hwey-Hwey "Vicky" Guo, business administrator and board secretary

== Board of education ==
The district's board of education is comprised of nine members who set policy and oversee the fiscal and educational operation of the district through its administration. As a Type II school district, the board's trustees are elected directly by voters to serve three-year terms of office on a staggered basis, with three seats up for election each year held (since 2013) as part of the November general election. The board appoints a superintendent to oversee the district's day-to-day operations and a business administrator to supervise the business functions of the district.

In November 2015, Kent Weisert was elected to the school board according to preliminary results even though he died two weeks before the election results came in.
