= Mark Sceurman =

American graphic artist

Mark Sceurman is a graphic artist and co-creator and publisher with Mark Moran of Weird NJ magazine and a state-by-state series of books. With Moran he co-hosted the spin-off television series Weird U.S. on the History Channel.

== Weird NJ ==
=== Weird NJ newsletter and magazine ===
Sceurman started the original Weird NJ in the early 1990s as a newsletter circulated to friends that featured local news items, historical anecdotes, and in particular legends and folk tales little known beyond the locality concerned.

After a story about the newsletter was published in the Bergen Record in 1992, people began to write asking for copies, so Sceurman decided to staple together the first three newsletters and sent it out as the first issue of Weird NJ. (According to Sceurman the 52nd person to write in was Moran, with whom he decided to enter into partnership.)

As successive editions of the magazine were published, readers began sending Sceurman and Moran undocumented "weird tales" from communities across New Jersey. Their initial assumption "that every town in the state had at least one good tale to tell" proved a gross underestimation. Notable subjects included reclusive colonies of albinos and evil cult sacrifices in the woods.

By the time of the eighth issue, Sceurman and Moran decided that they would investigate the stories being sent them at source. They were surprised to find that many of the strange tales were either true or contained an original core of truth.

=== Weird N.J. and the Weird U.S. series of books ===
After some dozen years of publishing the magazine, they were commissioned to write a book about their investigations, Weird NJ: Your Travel Guide to New Jersey's Local Legend and Best Kept Secrets, published in 2003.

Following the book's publication they started to receive letters from across the United States that indicated that what had at first seemed to them a very local New Jersey genre was in fact part of a wider, more universal phenomenon - people with remarkable stories to tell which they believed to be true wanted somebody to hear their story. This was the origin of the Weird U.S. state-by-state series of books.

== Publishing philosophy ==
While setting out to check out the substance of the legends and stories and their relationship to known events and historical data, Sceurman and Moran claim they make no attempt to differentiate between what is true and what is not but aim simply to present the local legends in as unadulterated a form as possible, leaving the task of separating fact from fiction to the reader. Nevertheless, they maintain that none of the stories have been made up solely for purposes of entertainment. They aim to document the stories as "an important and intrinsic part of our modern America culture", but because they are about real people or events or concern specific locations, the books serve as a travel guide as well, albeit because of problems of access they often use the description "travel guide of the mind".

== Commercial developments ==
The partnership has turned the newsletter into a magazine, a book series and a television series with a range of associated merchandise.

== Personal life ==
Sceurman, a past president of the Historical Society of Bloomfield, is a lifelong New Jersey resident and currently lives in Bloomfield, New Jersey with his wife Shirley and their son Alexander. He attended Bloomfield High School in his hometown, where his fellow graduates voted him "most likely to spontaneously combust".
