= Robert Birmelin =

American figurative painter

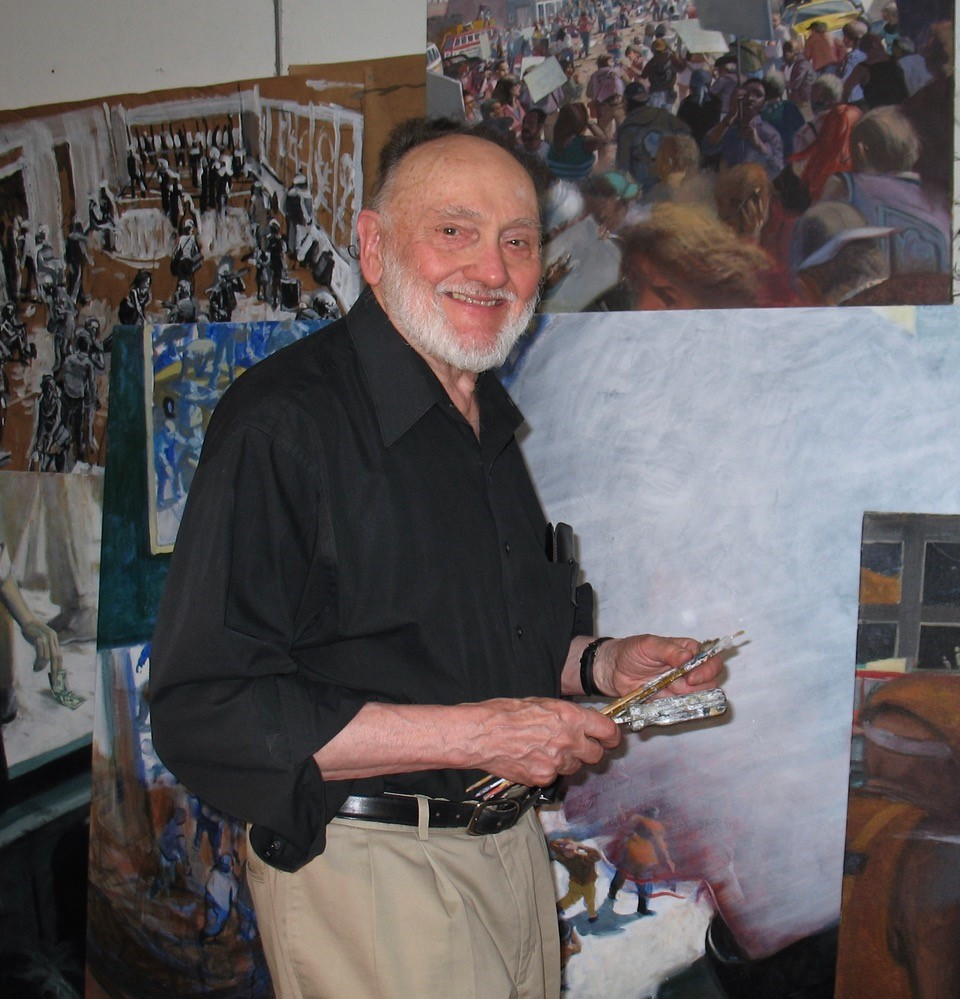
- Born: 1933 (age 92–93); Newark, New Jersey, U.S.
- Other names: August Robert; A. Robert Birmelin
- Education: Cooper Union Art School; Yale School of Art
- Occupations: American figurative painter, printmaker, and draughtsman
- Spouse: Blair Tillisch (m. 1960; died 2020)
- Website: robertbirmelin.com

Robert Birmelin (born 1933) is an American figurative painter, printmaker and draughtsman. In other contexts he is also known as August Robert or A. Robert Birmelin. He was born in Newark, New Jersey and currently resides in Leonia, New Jersey.

Birmelin is best known for his paintings and drawings capturing the drama of close physical involvement as experienced in the movement and tensions of the urban crowd. He has also explored a range of other subjects, including landscape and recently, more subjective themes dealing with memory and time, often employing double imagery. Since 2016 he has focused mainly on drawing, producing several long horizontal narrative works, inspired by the format of Chinese and Japanese scrolls he has studied at the Metropolitan Museum of Art. Drawing from life, from memory and imagination are central to his practice, strongly believing they yield more vigorous, personal visual imagery, than does the habit of relying to photographic sources, as is common among many contemporary figurative artists.

== Education ==
Born in Newark, Birmelin was raised in nearby Bloomfield, where he was encouraged to attend Cooper Union by a teacher of his at Bloomfield High School. Birmelin studied at the Cooper Union Art School (1951–1954) and Yale School of Art (1954–1956, BFA and 1959–1960, MFA), where Josef Albers, Bernard Chaet, and Gabor Peterdi were his most important mentors. He received a Fulbright Fellowship to the Slade School of the University of London (1960–61), followed by a Fellowship at the American Academy in Rome (1961–64).

== Exhibition history ==
Birmelin's work has been seen in 55 one-person exhibitions in the US and internationally, from his first show at The Stable Gallery in New York in 1960 to his most recent show at the Luise Ross Gallery in New York in 2016. His exhibitions include retrospectives at:

- The Columbus Museum, Columbus, Georgia (2003)
- The Jaffe-Friede Gallery at Dartmouth College (1999)
- The Jersey City Museum, Jersey City, New Jersey (1997)

He has also participated in many group exhibitions in the United States and Europe.

Birmelin's works are represented in 50 public collections, among them The Metropolitan Museum of Art, The Museum of Modern Art, and The Hirshhorn Museum in Washington D.C.

== Awards ==
Birmelin has received awards and grants from The National Endowment for the Arts, the Louis Comfort Tiffany Foundation, The National Academy, The American Academy of Arts and Letters, The Joan Mitchell Foundation, as well as four grants from the New Jersey State Council on the Arts, and three from The National Endowment for the Arts.

== Teaching ==
Birmelin was Professor in the Art Department at Queens College of The City University of New York from 1964 to 1999, and also has lectured at colleges and universities throughout the US.

== Personal life ==
In 1960, he and Blair Tillisch (1937–2020) were married. She was an artist and novelist. They have two sons: Lucas, a medical doctor and Nicholas, a musician.
