= Mark Moran (writer) =

American writer

Mark Moran is a co-creator of the Weird N.J. magazine and website. Moran, along with co-creator Mark Sceurman, started Weird N.J. as a homemade newsletter, passed out to family and friends. It was produced as an annual issue. The "zine" as they called it, contains articles, facts, and legends about weird places to visit in New Jersey.

His Internet success led him to co-create and co-star in the History Channel show Weird U.S.. In 2003, Moran and Sceurman published their first book, Weird N.J.: Your Travel Guide to New Jersey's Local Legends and Best Kept Secrets, followed by Weird U.S.: Your Travel Guide to America's Local Legends and Best Kept Secrets, which was published in 2004 by Barnes & Noble Press. In 2005–2006, the writers of Weird U.S. released a calendar based on the book.

== Bibliography ==
- Moran, Mark and Mark Sceurman (2004). Weird N.J.: Your Travel Guide to New Jersey's Local Legends and Best Kept Secrets. Barnes & Noble. ISBN 0-7607-3979-X.
- Moran, Mark and Mark Sceurman (2006). Weird N.J., Vol. 2: Your Travel Guide to New Jersey's Local Legends and Best Kept Secrets. Barnes & Noble. ISBN 1-4027-3941-9.
