= Charles J. Morris =

American lawyer

Charles J. Morris (1871-1924) was the ninth Speaker of the House of the South Dakota Legislature.

== Biography and education ==
Charles was born on January 10, 1871, near Galena, Illinois, to parents James Morris, who immigrated to the US from England in 1856, and Mary Louisa Morris who immigrated to the US from Switzerland. He was the 6th of 10 siblings.

Charles attended the local schools near Galena for his early education, then enrolled in the German-English College in Galena. Following this he enrolled in Northern Illinois Normal School in Dixon, Illinois. He received his law degree in 1898 from the Dixon College of law.

== Career ==
Charles moved to Sioux Falls, South Dakota in June 1899 and established his law practice. He first ran for public office in 1908, and was elected to the South Dakota House of Representatives. He was re-elected in 1910, and was selected by unanimous vote to be the Speaker of the House in the legislative session of 1911. On April 11, 1911, he was appointed assistant United States District Attorney of South Dakota, serving in that position until January 1913, when he was made District Attorney in place of E. E. Wagner who had resigned.

== Personal life ==
In Washington DC on July 10, 1907, Charles was married to Virginia Hazen. Virginia's ancestors included Napoleon Bonaparte. She was also known as a leading soprano soloist in the Washington, DC area and had performed in several musical programs at the White House while occupied by President William McKinley.

== Later life and death ==
From 1918-1922 Charles was county chairman of the Republican party, secretary of the State Central Committee, and President of the Minnehaha County Bar Association. He had traveled to Minneapolis, Minnesota in March 1924 on a business trip and to have minor surgery. Unfortunately, he died of complications of that surgery and died in a Minneapolis hospital on March 22, 1924. Services were held in Sioux Falls at the Masonic Temple and the body was shipped to Galena, Illinois where he was buried in Greenwood Cemetery on March 27, 1924.
