= Weird NJ =

Magazine for oddities based in New Jersey, US

Weird N.J.
- Cover of issue #17
- Publisher/Editor: Mark Sceurman; Mark Moran
- Senior Editor: Joanne Austin
- Staff writers: Wheeler Antabanez; Ryan Doan; Jon Grove; Cheryl Ann Marino; Kate Philbrick; Jesse P. Pollack; Keith Seminerio
- Photographer: Ryan Doan; Jennifer Rose; Rusty Tagliareni; Christina Mathews
- Categories: Guidebook, Local interests
- Frequency: Biannually
- Publisher: Weird NJ, LLC
- Founder: Mark Sceurman; Mark Moran
- Founded: 1989
- First issue: 1992
- Country: United States
- Based in: Bloomfield, NJ
- Language: English
- Website: www.weirdnj.com
- ISSN: 2159-2993
- OCLC: 27875028

Weird NJ (sometimes abbreviated WNJ) is a semi-annual magazine that chronicles local legends, purported hauntings, ghost stories, folklore, unusual places or events, and other peculiarities in New Jersey. The magazine originated in 1989 as a newsletter sent to friends by Mark Moran and Mark Sceurman, but as it grew in popularity, it became a public magazine published twice a year. It spawned a series of books called Weird US, which chronicle oddities from individual states in the United States aside from New Jersey, which in turn led to a television series that aired on the History Channel.

== History ==
Weird NJ began in 1989 as a personal newsletter sent to friends by Mark Moran and Mark Sceurman. Gradually it evolved from a fanzine into a public magazine published twice a year in May and October. Abandoned places, eerie experiences, unique people, and strange landmarks were and still are common subjects for the magazine. Past issues have covered everything from the Jersey Devil and UFO sightings to abandoned Nike missile silos, the legend of the "Hookerman" Lights and the life of Zip the Pinhead. Subjects covered include the Evil Clown of Middletown, Midgetville, "Gates of Hell", Shades of Death Road, Clinton Road, Demon Alley, and the Devil's Tower. The painting of a grinning face named Tillie from the Palace Amusements building in Asbury Park has appeared in several Weird NJ publications and on the magazine covers.

In 2003 a Weird NJ book, made up of content from earlier issues, was published. The next year saw the follow-up Weird US, covering sites and stories across the country. That led to a series of Weird US books for other states and areas, including Florida, Illinois, Wisconsin, Pennsylvania, Texas, California and New England, and a TV series, Weird U.S., on the History Channel. The popularity of the magazine has inspired a community of fans of Moran and Sceurman's work.

== See also ==
- List of paranormal magazines
