= Charles Morris (cricketer, born 1939) =

English cricketer

Personal information
- Full name: Charles Antony Morris
- Born: 9 May 1939; Cambridge, Cambridgeshire, England
- Died: 17 November 1990 (aged 51); Wilmslow, Cheshire, England
- Batting: Left-handed
- Bowling: Leg break googly

Domestic team information
- Years: Team
- 1956–1963: Cambridgeshire
- 1960: Cambridge University

Career statistics
Competition	First-class
Matches	4
Runs scored	23
Batting average	4.60
100s/50s	–/–
Top score	8
Balls bowled	72
Wickets	0
Bowling average	–
5 wickets in innings	–
10 wickets in match	–
Best bowling	–
Catches/stumpings	3/–
- Source: Cricinfo, 21 July 2019

Charles Antony Morris (9 May 1939 – 17 November 1990) was an English first-class cricketer.

Morris was born in May 1939 at Cambridge. He was educated at Marlborough College, before going up to King's College, Cambridge. While studying at Cambridge, he made four appearances in first-class cricket for Cambridge University in 1960, appearing against Yorkshire, Hampshire, the touring South Africans and Sussex. Across his four matches, Morris scored 23 runs and bowled twelve wicketless overs with his leg break googly bowling. In addition to playing first-class cricket, he also played minor counties cricket for Cambridgeshire from 1956–63, making thirty appearances in the Minor Counties Championship. He died in November 1990 at Wilmslow, Cheshire.
