= Charles Temple Morris =

Senior officer in the British Indian Army

Colonel Charles Temple Morris CBE
- Born: 9 January 1876; Lucknow, India
- Died: 1 June 1956 (aged 80) Kensington, England
- Allegiance: United Kingdom
- Branch: British Army; British India
- Service years: 1895-1931
- Rank: Colonel
- Commands: 5th Battalion 1st Punjab Regiment
- Conflicts: North West Frontier; World War I
- Awards: CBE; Mentioned in despatches (3)

Colonel Charles Temple Morris CBE (9 January 1876 – 1 June 1956), was a senior officer in the British Indian Army and commander of the 5th Battalion of the 1st Punjab Regiment between 1921 and 1926.

== Early life ==
Charles Temple Morris was born in Lucknow, India in 1876, the third son of Lieutenant-Colonel George Tomkins Morris of the Bengal Staff Corps. He was educated in England at Bedford Modern School where, in 1894, his record for the 440 yards went unbroken for the following 62 years.

== Military career ==
Morris was commissioned into the 4th (Militia) battalion the West Yorkshire Regiment on 13 February 1895, then received a regular commission into the 2nd Battalion of the Green Howards 15 May 1897, later transferring to the Indian Army in 1901. He served in the North West Frontier between 1897 and 1898 (medal, 2 clasps), in 1908 (medal, 1 clasp) and in 1915. During the European War he saw service in Mesopotamia in 1916 where he was mentioned in despatches.

Morris served again in the North West Frontier between 1919 and 1921 where he was awarded 2 clasps to his 1908 medal, mentioned in despatches twice and invested as a Commander of the Order of the British Empire. He commanded the 5th Battalion 1st Punjab Regiment between 1921 and 1926 and retired from military service in 1931.

== Family life ==
In 1901 Morris married Marie Willoughby Osborne with whom he had one son. He died in Kensington on 1 June 1956.
