= Benjamin Holman =

American journalist

Benjamin F. Holman (1930 – January 20, 2007) was a pioneering American newspaper and television reporter.

Holman was born in Columbia, South Carolina. His father died when he was four years old, and his mother moved with him and his sister to Bloomfield, New Jersey. As a young man, he hoped to combine his love for writing, music, and engineering by creating musical theater. Before he graduated from high school, however, he had decided to become a journalist.

Holman attended Lincoln University in Pennsylvania before transferring to the University of Kansas. There, he graduated first in his class with a degree in journalism. Afterward, he pursued graduate studies at the University of Chicago.

Holman worked for the Chicago Daily News and CBS News; he was one of the nation's few prominent black journalists. Afterward, Holman spent eight years working for the administrations of Richard Nixon and Gerald Ford as director of community relations, during which he helped mediate racial disputes. He was also the assistant attorney general for the Justice Department; therefore, he was the highest-ranking African-American.

In 1979, he began teaching in the journalism department of the University of Maryland, College Park. Holman helped shape the university's Philip Merrill College of Journalism, and retired in 2004. He died on January 20, 2007, of complications from emphysema and congestive heart failure at George Washington University Hospital.
