= Charles A. Morris =

American engineer

Charles A. Morris (1853 - March 8, 1914) was a Bloomfield, New Jersey engineer who owned his own dredging firm in New Jersey in the 1880s. Born in 1853, Morris came from a family of engineers and inventors. He invented a sliding bucket used for loading ships and other shipping devices. He helped the pioneering inventor John Philip Holland gain acceptance of his craft within the United States naval community. Mr. Morris was a good friend of the inventor and helped him out during a time when Holland was in financial trouble prior to the acceptance of The United States Navy's first commissioned submarine, USS Holland (SS-1). Morris served as the shipyard superintending engineer on the submarine project from 1896 to 1897. The pioneering submarine was purchased by the United States Government on 11 April 1900.
