= Charles R. Morris =

American lawyer, banker, and author (1939–2021)

- Born: Charles Richard Morris; October 23, 1939; Oakland, California, U.S.
- Died: December 13, 2021 (aged 82); Hampton, New Hampshire, U.S.
- Education: University of Pennsylvania Law School
- Occupations: Lawyer; journalist; author
- Spouse: Beverly Gilligan
- Children: 3

Charles Richard Morris (October 23, 1939 – December 13, 2021) was an American lawyer, banker, and author. He wrote fifteen books, and was a regular contributor to the Los Angeles Times, The Wall Street Journal, and The Atlantic Monthly.

== Personal life ==
Morris was born in Oakland, California. His father Charles B. Morris worked as a technician in an ink factory, and his mother Mildred was a housewife. Morris attended the Mother of the Savior Seminary in Blackwood, New Jersey, and completed a bachelor's degree at the University of Pennsylvania in 1963.

Morris married Beverly Gilligan Morris and they had three children.

== Career ==
After graduation, Morris decided to work for the New Jersey state government, serving as director of the office of economic opportunity from 1965 to 1969. He then moved to the New York City government, where he worked as assistant budget director and welfare director. He simultaneously studied at the University of Pennsylvania Law School, graduating in 1972. With his experience, he was hired by the state of Washington as secretary of social health services. Morris worked in the government for 12 years in total.

After leaving the government, Morris worked as a vice president for international finance at Chase Manhattan Bank. While in this job, Morris drew on his city government experience to publish his first book, The Cost of Good Intentions: New York City and the Liberal Experiment (1981). After moving to other areas of the Corporate Banking group, Morris left and worked for fifteen years as Managing Director of Devonshire Partners, a financial technology consulting firm.

Morris wrote Computer Wars: The Fall of IBM and the Future of Western Technology (1993) in collaboration with computer consultant Charles H. Ferguson. When Ferguson cofounded the financial software startup company CapitalThinking Inc. in 1999, Morris soon became vice president for Finance and Administration. Around August 2000, Morris was named Chief Operating Officer. By November 2001, he also served as President of the company. Morris remained with the company until 2004; its business allowed him to see the rise of credit derivative trading, leading to his Meltdown books.

== Death ==
Morris died from complications of dementia in Hampton, New Hampshire, on December 13, 2021, at age 82, the same day as one of his siblings.

== Awards ==
- 2009 Gerald Loeb Award in the business book category for:

Morris, Charles R. (2008). The Trillion Dollar Meltdown: Easy Money, High Rollers, and the Great Credit Crash. PublicAffairs. ISBN 978-1-58648-563-4.

== Books ==
- A Rabble of Dead Money: The Great Crash and the Global Depression: 1929–1939 (2017)
- Comeback: America's New Economic Boom (2013)
- The Dawn of Innovation: The First American Industrial Revolution (2012)
- The Sages: Warren Buffett, George Soros, Paul Volcker, and the Maelstrom of Markets (2009)
- The Trillion Dollar Meltdown (2008); updated paperback released as The Two Trillion Dollar Meltdown (2008)
- The Surgeons: Life and Death in a Top Heart Center (2007)
- The Tycoons: How Andrew Carnegie, John D. Rockefeller, Jay Gould, and J. P. Morgan Invented the American Supereconomy (2005)
- Money, Greed, and Risk: Why Financial Crises and Crashes Happen (1999)
- American Catholic: The Saints and Sinners Who Built America's Most Powerful Church (1997)
- The AARP: America's Most Powerful Lobby and the Clash of Generations (1996)
- Computer Wars: The Fall of IBM and the Future of Western Technology (1993, with Charles H. Ferguson)
- The Coming Global Boom (1990)
- Iron Destinies, Lost Opportunities: The Arms Race Between the United States and the Soviet Union, 1945–1987 (1988)
- A Time of Passion: America, 1960–1980 (1985)
- The Cost of Good Intentions: New York City and the Liberal Experiment (1981)

== Film ==
Morris appears in the 2010 Oscar-winning documentary film Inside Job.
