= Charles Morris (cricketer, born 1880) =

English cricketer

Personal information
- Full name: Charles Richard Morris
- Born: 26 August 1880; Nottingham, Nottinghamshire, England
- Died: 10 August 1947 (aged 66); Hampstead, London, England
- Batting: Right-handed

Domestic team information
- Years: Team
- 1902–1904: Nottinghamshire

Career statistics
Competition	First-class
Matches	5
Runs scored	63
Batting average	9.00
100s/50s	–/–
Top score	24*
Balls bowled	–
Wickets	–
Bowling average	–
5 wickets in innings	–
10 wickets in match	–
Best bowling	–
Catches/stumpings	5/–
- Source: Cricinfo, 23 May 2012

Charles Richard Morris (26 August 1880 – 10 August 1947) was an English cricketer. Morris was a right-handed batsman. He was born at Nottingham, Nottinghamshire.

Morris made his first-class debut for Nottinghamshire against Lancashire at Old Trafford in the 1902 County Championship. He made four further first-class appearances, all of which came in the 1904 County Championship, with his final appearance coming against Sussex at Trent Bridge. In his five first-class appearances for Nottinghamshire, he scored a total of 63 runs at an average of 9.00, with a high score of 24 not out.

He died at Hampstead, London, on 10 August 1947.
