= Saddle River School District =

School district in Bergen County, New Jersey, US

Address
- 97 East Allendale Road Saddle River, Bergen County, New Jersey, 07458; United States
- Coordinates: 41.031428°N 74.096736°W

District information
- Grades: PreK-5
- Superintendent: Jennifer Macones
- Business administrator: Thomas O'Hern
- Schools: 1

Students and staff
- Enrollment: 125 (as of 2024–25)
- Faculty: 14.7 FTEs
- Student–teacher ratio: 8.5:1

Other information
- District Factor Group: J
- Website: www.wandellschool.org
Ind.	Per pupil	District spending	Rank (*)	K-6 average	%± vs. average
1A	Total Spending	$21,022	51	$18,891	11.3%
1	Budgetary Cost	25,697	59	13,649	88.3%
2	Classroom Instruction	12,945	58	8,366	54.7%
6	Support Services	8,265	59	2,161	282.5%
8	Administrative Cost	1,978	53	1,467	34.8%
10	Operations & Maintenance	2,464	54	1,552	58.8%
16	Median Teacher Salary	63,706	49	57,437
Data from NJDoE 2014 Taxpayers' Guide to Education Spending. *Of K-6 districts with any number of students. Lowest spending=1; Highest=59

The Saddle River School District is a community public school district that serves students in pre-kindergarten through fifth grade from Saddle River, in Bergen County, in the U.S. state of New Jersey.

As of the 2024–25 school year, the district, comprised of one school, had an enrollment of 125 students and 14.7 classroom teachers (on an FTE basis), for a student–teacher ratio of 8.5:1. In the 2016–17 school year, Saddle River was tied for the 28th-smallest enrollment of any school district in the state, with 150 students.

The district had been classified by the New Jersey Department of Education as being in District Factor Group "J", the-highest of eight groupings. District Factor Groups organize districts statewide to allow comparison by common socioeconomic characteristics of the local districts. From lowest socioeconomic status to highest, the categories are A, B, CD, DE, FG, GH, I and J.

Public school students from Saddle River attend the Ramsey Public School District's middle school and then have the option of attending either Ramsey High School or Northern Highlands Regional High School as part of sending/receiving relationships with each of the respective districts. As of the 2024–25 school year, the Northern Highlands Regional High School had an enrollment of 1,257 students and 109.7 classroom teachers (on an FTE basis), for a student–teacher ratio of 11.5:1, while Ramsey High School had an enrollment of 739 students and 77.8 classroom teachers (on an FTE basis), for a student–teacher ratio of 9.5:1. One of under ten districts in the state with a dual send-receive relationship, three quarters of Saddle River's high school students attend Northern Highlands and about a quarter attend Ramsey High School.

== Schools ==
Wandell School served 116 students in pre-kindergarten through fifth grade as of the 2024–25 school year.

== Administration ==
Core members of the district's administration are:

- Jennifer Macones, superintendent and principal
- Thomas O'Hern, board secretary and business administrator

== Board of education ==
The district's board of education, comprised of five members, sets policy and oversees the fiscal and educational operation of the district through its administration. As a Type II school district, the board's trustees are elected directly by voters to serve three-year terms of office on a staggered basis, with either one or two seats up for election each year held (since 2012) as part of the November general election. The board appoints a superintendent to oversee the district's day-to-day operations and a business administrator to supervise the business functions of the district.

As of 2012, school elections were shifted from April to the November general election as part of an effort to reduce the costs of a standalone April vote.
