= Hillsdale Public Schools =

Schools in New Jersey, United States

Address
- 32 Ruckman Road Hillsdale, Bergen County, New Jersey, 07642; United States
- Coordinates: 41.009925°N 74.023704°W

District information
- Grades: K–8
- Superintendent: Robert Lombardy
- Business administrator: Sacha Pouliot
- Schools: 3

Students and staff
- Enrollment: 1,149 (as of 2023–24)
- Faculty: 126.3 FTEs
- Student–teacher ratio: 9.1:1

Other information
- District Factor Group: GH
- Website: www.hillsdaleschools.com
Ind.	Per pupil	District spending	Rank (*)	K-8 average	%± vs. average
1A	Total Spending	$16,511	28	$18,891	−12.6%
1	Budgetary Cost	14,245	43	14,159	0.6%
2	Classroom Instruction	8,456	39	8,659	−2.3%
6	Support Services	2,502	65	2,167	15.5%
8	Administrative Cost	1,579	45	1,547	2.1%
10	Operations & Maintenance	1,588	48	1,612	−1.5%
13	Extracurricular Activities	104	50	104	0.0%
16	Median Teacher Salary	64,465	63	61,136
Data from NJDoE 2014 Taxpayers' Guide to Education Spending. *Of K-8 districts with more than 750 students. Lowest spending=1; Highest=84

The Hillsdale Public Schools is a community public school district that serves students in pre-kindergarten through eighth grade in Hillsdale, in Bergen County, in the U.S. state of New Jersey.

As of the 2023–24 school year, the district, comprised of three schools, had an enrollment of 1,149 students and 126.3 classroom teachers (on an FTE basis), for a student–teacher ratio of 9.1:1.

Public school students in ninth through twelfth grades attend Pascack Valley High School along with students from neighboring River Vale. The school is part of the Pascack Valley Regional High School District, which also serves students from Montvale and Woodcliff Lake at Pascack Hills High School. As of the 2023–24 school year, the high school had an enrollment of 955 students and 93.8 classroom teachers (on an FTE basis), for a student–teacher ratio of 10.2:1.

== History ==
Before Pascack Valley High School opened in September 1955, students from Hillsdale (along with those from Montvale and Woodcliff Lake) had attended Park Ridge High School as part of sending/receiving relationships.

The district had been classified by the New Jersey Department of Education as being in District Factor Group "GH", the third-highest of eight groupings. District Factor Groups organize districts statewide to allow comparison by common socioeconomic characteristics of the local districts. From lowest socioeconomic status to highest, the categories are A, B, CD, DE, FG, GH, I and J.

== Schools ==
Schools in the district (with 2023–24 enrollment data from the National Center for Education Statistics) are:

Elementary schools

- Ann Blanche Smith School with 304 students in grades K–4
  - Christine Higgins, principal
- Meadowbrook Elementary School with 333 students in grades PreK–4
  - Christopher R. Bell, principal

Middle school

- George G. White Middle School with 992 students in grades 5–8
  - Jaclyn Derwin, principal

== Administration ==
Core members of the district's administration are:

- Robert V. Lombardy Jr., superintendent of schools
- Sacha Pouliot, business administrator and board secretary

== Board of education ==
The district's board of education, comprised of five members, sets policy and oversees the fiscal and educational operation of the district through its administration. As a Type II school district, the board's trustees are elected directly by voters to serve three-year terms of office on a staggered basis, with one to two seats up for election each year held (since 2012) as part of the November general election. The board appoints a superintendent to oversee the district's day-to-day operations and a business administrator to supervise the business functions of the district.
