= Mahwah =

Mahwah may refer to the following in the U.S. state of New Jersey:

- Mahwah River, a tributary of the Ramapo River
- Mahwah, New Jersey, a township in Bergen County
  - Mahwah Township Public Schools, a school district in the above township
    - Mahwah High School, in the above school district
- Mahwah (NJT station), a New Jersey Transit rail station
