= Mahwah High School =

High school in Bergen County, New Jersey, US

Location
- 50 Ridge Road; Mahwah, Bergen County, New Jersey 07430; United States; 41.091033°N 74.156778°W

Information
- Type: Public high school
- Established: 1958; 68 years ago
- School district: Mahwah Township Public Schools
- NCES School ID: 340933000586
- Principal: Danielle Wood
- Faculty: 90.9 FTEs
- Enrollment: 829 (as of 2024–25)
- Student to teacher ratio: 9.1:1
- Campus: Suburban
- Colors: Columbia Blue and Black
- Athletics conference: Big North Conference (general); North Jersey Super Football Conference (football)
- Team name: Thunderbirds
- Rival: Ramsey Rams
- Website: hs.mahwah.k12.nj.us

Mahwah High School (MHS) is a four-year comprehensive public high school serving students from Mahwah in Bergen County, in the U.S. state of New Jersey, serving students in ninth through twelfth grades as the only secondary school of the Mahwah Township Public Schools. The school is accredited by the New Jersey Department of Education and has been accredited by the Middle States Association of Colleges and Schools Commission on Elementary and Secondary Schools since 1962.

As of the 2024–25 school year, the school had an enrollment of 829 students and 90.9 classroom teachers (on an FTE basis), for a student–teacher ratio of 9.1:1. There were 115 students (13.9% of enrollment) eligible for free lunch and 22 (2.7% of students) eligible for reduced-cost lunch.

== History ==
Through the 1957-58 school year, students from Mahwah joined those from Allendale, Saddle River and Upper Saddle River who attended Ramsey High School as part of sending/receiving relationships with the respective districts and the Ramsey Public School District. Allendale and Mahwah left the Ramsey district in September 1958 once Mahwah High School was opened. With construction delayed due to labor actions, Mahwah High School started the year with afternoon classes housed in space rented at Ramsey High School. Completed at a cost of $3.6 million (equivalent to $39.4 million in 2025), the high school facility opened for students in February 1959.

Construction on the $3.25 million campus-style facility began in August 1958, with 13 buildings spread out over 20 acres (8.1 ha) of the 62-acre (25 ha) property to accommodate 600 students from Mahwah and Allendale. Delays in starting the work meant that the initial set of classrooms would not be available until November 1958, with completion of the 1,200-student capacity facility due for February 1959. Before the buildings opened, the district rented space from Ramsey High School, with Allendale and Mahwah students who had already started in the Ramsey district remaining there until graduation. With the opening of the high school, the Mahwah district's elementary schools were changed from K-8 to K-6, with the new high school serving students in grades 7-12.

In May 1963, voters in Allendale and Upper Saddle River approved a referendum to create Northern Highlands Regional High School, with the expenditure of $3.65 million to build a facility on a 40-acre site, with plans to complete the building in time to start classes in September 1965. The Northern Highland school building, completed at a cost of $4 million, was dedicated in February 1966. The first all-Mahwah graduating class was in 1967.

The present school building was constructed in 1984 with three floors on the site of the original school, with an addition completed in "March 2005" (along with the expansion of Ramapo Ridge Middle School), according to a plaque in the new wing.

In Fall 2009, the Freshman Advisory, a full year freshman transition program, was implemented. Freshman Advisory is a required course for all freshman students, and it is taught by upperclassmen (juniors and seniors) and supervised by the high school faculty. The following topics are addressed: study and organizational skills, time management, coping skills, peer pressure, Habits of Mind, and college/post-secondary planning.

In Summer of 2018 construction began on a new extension to the high school. Named the STEAM room and also known as The Thunderbird Think Tank and houses new science rooms and computer labs. The extension was completed August, 2019 and opened for students in September, 2019.

== Awards, recognition and rankings ==
The school was the 69th-ranked public high school in New Jersey out of 339 schools statewide in New Jersey Monthly magazine's September 2014 cover story on the state's "Top Public High Schools", using a new ranking methodology. The school had been ranked 55th in state of 328 schools in 2012, after being ranked 56th in 2010 out of 322 schools listed. The magazine ranked the school 68th in 2008 out of 316 schools. The school was ranked 46th in the magazine's 2006 rankings. Schooldigger.com ranked the school 79th out of 381 public high schools statewide in its 2011 rankings (a decrease of 18 positions from the 2010 ranking) which were based on the combined percentage of students classified as proficient or above proficient on the mathematics (90.9%) and language arts literacy (94.8%) components of the High School Proficiency Assessment (HSPA).

In the 2011 "Ranking America's High Schools" issue by The Washington Post, the school was ranked 70th in New Jersey and 2,033rd nationwide.

In its 2013 report on "America's Best High Schools", The Daily Beast ranked the school 615th in the nation among participating public high schools and 47th among schools in New Jersey.

In its listing of "America's Best High Schools 2016", the school was ranked 366th out of 500 best high schools in the country; it was ranked 42nd among all high schools in New Jersey and 25th among the state's non-magnet schools.

In Niches 2017 list of the Best Schools in the Nation, Mahwah High School as the 28th school in New Jersey.

In its 2020 annual ranking of 17,792 secondary public schools across the country, U.S. News & World Report ranked Mahwah High School as 39th best out of 451 secondary schools in New Jersey and 888th best in the United States.

== Advanced Placement offerings ==
Mahwah High School offers 20 Advanced Placement (AP) courses, which include AP Biology, AP Calculus AB, AP Calculus BC, AP Chemistry, AP Computer Science, AP Economics (includes one semester of macroeconomics and one semester of microeconomics), AP English Language and Composition, AP English Literature and Composition, AP European History, AP French Language and Culture, AP Music Theory, AP Physics, AP Psychology, AP Spanish, AP Statistics, AP Studio Art, AP Psychology AP United States Government and Politics, and AP US History. In the 2009-10 school year, 128 students participated in Mahwah High School's AP course offerings, taking a total of 258 examinations that year of which 87% achieved a grade of 3 or higher.

== Athletics ==
The Mahwah High School Thunderbirds compete in the Big North Conference, which is comprised of public and private high schools in Bergen and Passaic counties and was established following a reorganization of sports leagues in Northern New Jersey by the New Jersey State Interscholastic Athletic Association (NJSIAA). Prior to the 2010 realignment, Mahwah was one of the member schools of the North Bergen Interscholastic Athletic League. With 676 students in grades 10-12, the school was classified by the NJSIAA for the 2019–20 school year as Group II for most athletic competition purposes, which included schools with an enrollment of 486 to 758 students in that grade range. The football team competes in the American Red division of the North Jersey Super Football Conference, which includes 112 schools competing in 20 divisions, making it the nation's biggest football-only high school sports league. The school was classified by the NJSIAA as Group II North for football for 2024–2026, which included schools with 484 to 683 students.

Interscholastic sports offered include (those listed with an asterisk, although they are technically two teams that compete and score separately, usually practice and have their events with each other):

- Fall sports: Cross country (boys)*, Cross country (girls)*, Football (boys), Soccer (boys), Soccer (boys), Soccer (girls), Tennis (girls), Volleyball (girls), Marching Band and Fall Cheerleading.
- Winter sports: Basketball (boys), Basketball (girls), Bowling (boys)*, Bowling (girls)*, Ice hockey (boys), Track (boys)*, Track (girls)*, Wrestling (boys) and Winter Cheerleading
- Spring sports: Baseball (boys), Golf (boys)*, Golf (girls)*, Softball (girls), Tennis (boys), Track (boys)*, Track (girls)*, Lacrosse (boys) and Lacrosse (girls)

The football team was awarded the sectional championship by the New Jersey State Interscholastic Athletic Association in 1960 (as co-champion). Since the playoff system was introduced in 1974, the team has won the NJSIAA North I Group I state sectional championship in 1978, 1979, 1981, 2015 and 2016. The 1978 team finished the season with a 10-1 record after a 48-20 win against Park Ridge High School in the North I Group I state sectional championship game. The team won the 1979 North I Group I sectional title with a 49-16 win against Pompton Lakes High School in the finals. In 1981, the team finished the season with a 9-1-1 record after winning the North I Group I state sectional title by defeating Park Ridge High School by a score of 21-11 in the championship game. In 2015, the football team finished with a team record 11 wins, defeating Glen Rock High School by a score of 38-13 in the tournament final at MetLife Stadium to win the North I Group II state sectional title. In 2016, the team won its second consecutive North I, Group II state sectional title with a 35-28 win against Westwood Regional High School in the tournament final, the program's fifth title in the playoff era.

The boys cross country running team won the Group II state championship in 1975.

The girls' basketball team won the Group II state title in 1993, defeating Delran High School by a score of 34-27 in the tournament final played at Monmouth College.

In 2010, the boys lacrosse team defeated Bergen Catholic High School in the BCCA Lacrosse Championship 10-6 to win a county title in only its second year of varsity existence.

The girls' soccer team won the Group I state championship in 1985 (defeating Maple Shade High School in the tournament final) and won the Group II title in 2010 (vs. Arthur L. Johnson High School). The 1985 team finished the season with a 15-3-3 record after winning the Group I title with a 4-0 victory against Maple Shade in the championship game played at Mercer County Park. In 2010, the girls soccer team, ranked 15th in the state by The Star-Ledger, defeated Arthur L. Johnson High School in the NJSIAA Group II state finals, with a final score of 3-1. The team had made it to the 2009 NJSIAA Group II State Finals, before losing 2-1 in overtime to Haddonfield Memorial High School.

The girls tennis team won the Group I state championship in 1985, defeating Haddonfield Memorial High School in the tournament final. The team won the 1985 title with a 4-1 win against Metuchen High School in the semifinals and a 5-0 victory in the finals against Haddonfield.

The 2012 baseball team defeated Buena Regional High School by a score of 11-4 to capture the Group II state championship, earning the first baseball state championship in the team's 52 seasons.

In 2014, the boy's winter track and field team defeated a field of over 20 teams and won the North I Group II state sectional title.

== Extra-curricular activities ==
Some of the extra-curricular activities offered at Mahwah High School include Ani-Pals, Art Club, Athletes in Action, Audio-Visual Club, Calliope (literary magazine), Chinese Honor Society, Current Events Club, Environmental Club, Executive Student Council, Future Business Leaders of America (FBLA), French National Honor Society, Gay-Straight Alliance, Junior Classical League, Marching band, Mock trial, Model United Nations, Multi-Cultural Club, National Honor Society, Omni Club, Philosophy Club, Reaching Everyone By Exposing Lies (REBEL), Science National Honor Society, Spanish National Honor Society, Stage Crew, Ski Club, Step Dance, Student Council, Students Against Destructive Decisions (SADD), Students Against Violence Everywhere (SAVE), Thunderbird (yearbook), Tom-Tom (school paper), Ultimate Frisbee Club, Interact, Wood Tech Club and Young Politicians Club. Additionally, freshman, sophomore, junior, and senior class activities are offered.

=== The Robo T-Birds ===
One of the older clubs in the school, the Robotics Club Team 1672, was started in 2005. This team is part of the FIRST Robotics Competition. This club encourages all students with or without knowledge in the STEM field wishing to learn more about mechanical engineering, electrical engineering, computer science, as well as running a business. Teams of high school students around the world compete in annual competitions.

=== Mock trial ===
The mock trial team has won four Bergen County titles, in 2008, 2011, 2012, and 2014.

== Administration ==
The school's principal is Danielle Wood. Her administration team includes two assistant principals.

== Notable alumni ==
- Curt Blefary (1943–2001), professional baseball player who was American League Rookie of the Year in 1965
- Frank Chamberlin (1978–2013), NFL linebacker with the Houston Texans
- Brad Fischetti (born 1975), member of the pop band Lyte Funky Ones
- Jared Greenberg, basketball sideline reporter for the NBA on TNT
- Kevin Haslam (born 1986), NFL offensive tackle with the Jacksonville Jaguars
- Vlad Holiday (born 1989), singer, songwriter, producer and multi-instrumentalist who is the lead singer and founder of the New York City-based indie band Born Cages
- John Hollinger (born 1971), Vice President of Basketball Operations for the Memphis Grizzlies
- Bob Kratch (born 1966), former guard who played in the NFL for the New York Giants and New England Patriots
- Maria Pitillo (born 1966), actress who appeared in the 1998 film Godzilla(attended)
- Randy Reutershan (born 1955), defensive back who played for the Pittsburgh Steelers
- Kyle Teel (born 2002), catcher for the Chicago White Sox
- Chris Wragge (born 1970), news anchor for WCBS-TV
