= Ho-Ho-Kus School District =

School district in New Jersey, United States

Address
- 70 Lloyd Road Ho-Ho-Kus, Bergen County, New Jersey, 07423; United States
- Coordinates: 41.000266°N 74.10403°W

District information
- Grades: PreK-8
- Superintendent: Linda Bovino
- Business administrator: Kathleen Marano (interim)
- Schools: 1

Students and staff
- Enrollment: 584 (as of 2024–25)
- Faculty: 47.9 FTEs
- Student–teacher ratio: 12.2:1

Other information
- District Factor Group: J
- Website: www.hohokus.org
Ind.	Per pupil	District spending	Rank (*)	K-8 average	%± vs. average
1A	Total Spending	$16,325	15	$18,891	−13.6%
1	Budgetary Cost	13,405	22	14,159	−5.3%
2	Classroom Instruction	7,814	17	8,659	−9.8%
6	Support Services	2,235	33	2,167	3.1%
8	Administrative Cost	1,828	48	1,547	18.2%
10	Operations & Maintenance	1,446	20	1,612	−10.3%
13	Extracurricular Activities	80	20	104	−23.1%
16	Median Teacher Salary	68,982	56	61,136
Data from NJDoE 2014 Taxpayers' Guide to Education Spending. *Of K-8 districts with 401-750 students. Lowest spending=1; Highest=64

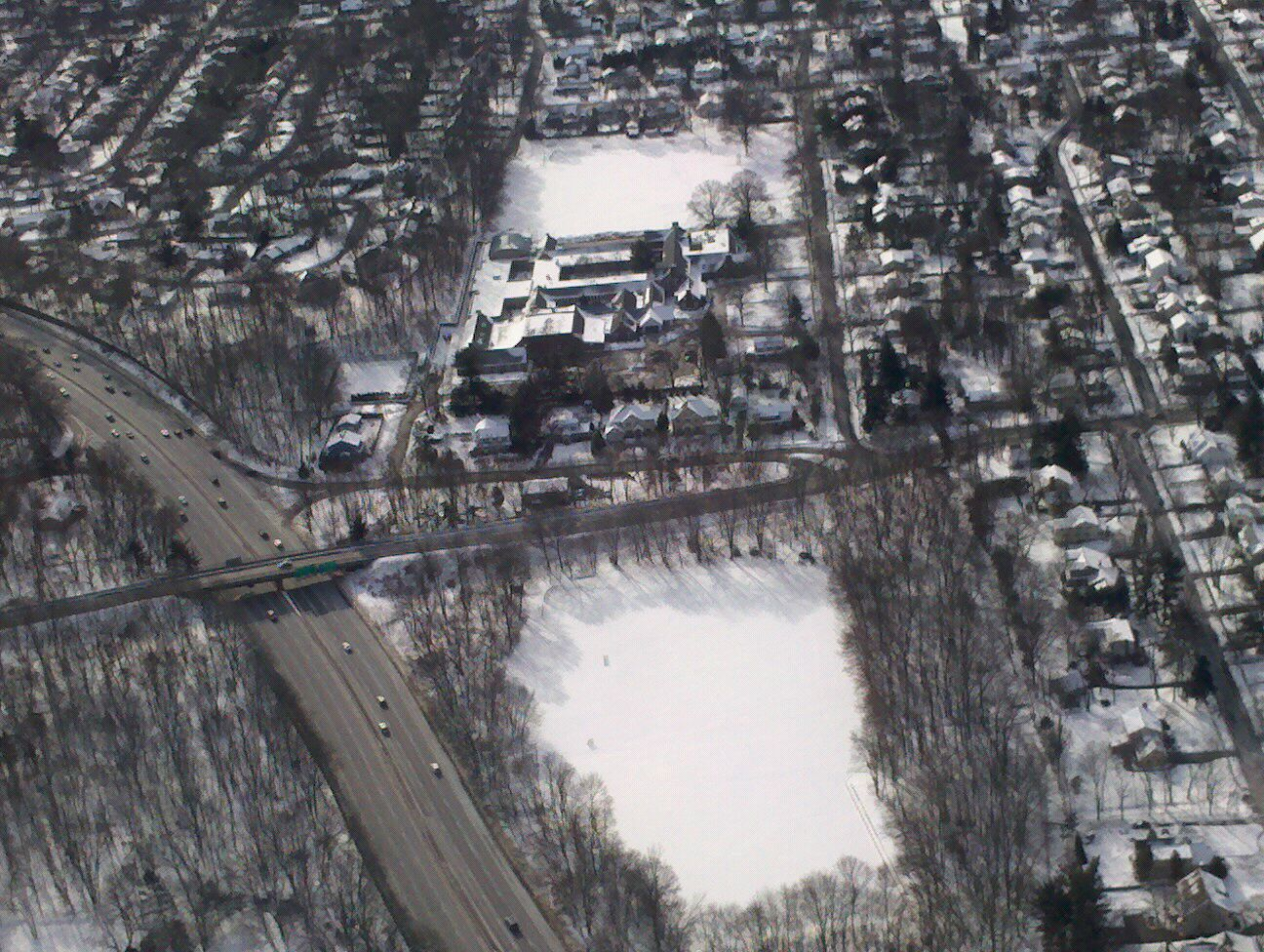
Aerial view of Ho-Ho-Kus Public School, its snow-covered North Field and nearby Route 17, looking south; January 2011

Ho-Ho-Kus School District is a community public school district located in Ho-Ho-Kus, in the U.S. state of New Jersey, that serves students in pre-kindergarten through eighth grade.

As of the 2024–25 school year, the district, comprised of one school, had an enrollment of 584 students and 47.9 classroom teachers (on an FTE basis), for a student–teacher ratio of 12.2:1.

Public school students in Ho-Ho-Kus for ninth through twelfth grades attend Northern Highlands Regional High School, which also serves students from Allendale, Upper Saddle River and some of Saddle River's students (who have the option of attending either Northern Highlands or Ramsey High School, as part of sending/receiving relationships with the two districts). In 2016, the Ho-Ho-Kus and Northern Highlands districts reached an agreement to extend the send / receive agreement through 2026 under a fixed-price contract by which Ho-Ho-Kus would pay $3.6 million for the 2016-17 school year, escalating by 2% a year to $4.3 million in 2025-26, regardless of the number of students from the borough sent to the high school.

As of the 2024–25 school year, the high school had an enrollment of 1,257 students and 109.7 classroom teachers (on an FTE basis), for a student–teacher ratio of 11.5:1.

== History ==
The district's original school building was constructed in 1936. Over the years, several additions have been made to the school. The most recent construction added 30,000 square feet (2,800 m^{2}) of space, primarily in the middle school wing, but the addition included the new cafeteria, two science rooms, and administrative offices. There was also a renovation of the existing school building.

A 1973 plan to have students from Ho-Ho-Kus attend Midland Park High School in Midland Park, New Jersey as part of a combined regional district never came to fruition, despite official approval and encouragement by the New Jersey Board of Education. Ridgewood had been hosting students in grades 9 to 12 from Ho-Ho-Kus at Ridgewood High School for 75 years as part of a sending/receiving relationship, until the Ridgewood board of education ended the arrangement in 1973 due to overcrowding and a proposed regionalization agreement between Ho-Ho-Kus and Ridgewood was rejected by voters from both communities in 1969. The state had proposed the formation of a regional agreement between Ho-Ho-Kus and Midland Park, though the choices of funding based on either property values or on the number of students would mean that one borough would shoulder higher costs than the other, regardless of which method was selected, given the sharp differences in demographics between the two communities.

The small size of Midland Park High School and the lack of electives led to efforts in the mid-1990s to find another high school to serve students from the borough. Since then, high school students from Ho-Ho-Kus have been attending Northern Highlands Regional High School. The current agreement between Ho-Ho-Kus and Northern Highlands runs through 2018.

In 2012, school elections were shifted from April to the November general election as part of an effort to reduce the costs of a standalone April vote.

The district had been classified by the New Jersey Department of Education as being in District Factor Group "J", the highest of eight groupings. District Factor Groups organize districts statewide to allow comparison by common socioeconomic characteristics of the local districts. From lowest socioeconomic status to highest, the categories are A, B, CD, DE, FG, GH, I and J.

In September 2024, the district dedicated Duffield Hall, a new gymnasium and wellness center funded by David Duffield, a technology entrepreneur who was a 1954 district graduate whose mother taught at the school.

== Awards and recognition ==
During the 1989-90 school year, Ho-Ho-Kus Public School was awarded the Blue Ribbon School Award of Excellence by the United States Department of Education, the highest award an American school can receive.

In 2002, John Smith of the Ho-Ho-Kus Public School was recognized with the History of Distinguished Leadership Award by the New Jersey Association for Health, Physical Education, Recreation and Dance.

== School ==
Ho-Ho-Kus Public School had an enrollment of 573 students in grades PreK–8 as of the 2024–25 school year.

- Martha Walsh, principal

== Administration ==
Core members of the district's administration are:

- Linda Bovino, superintendent
- Kathleen Marano, interim business administrator / board secretary

== Board of education ==
The district's board of education, composed of five members, sets policy and oversees the fiscal and educational operation of the district through its administration. As a Type II school district, the board's trustees are elected directly by voters to serve three-year terms of office on a staggered basis, with either one or two seats up for election each year held (since 2012) as part of the November general election. The board appoints a superintendent to oversee the district's day-to-day operations and a business administrator to supervise the business functions of the district.
