= Pascack Valley High School =

High school in Bergen County, New Jersey, US

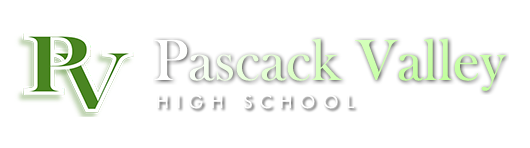

Location
- 200 Piermont Avenue; Hillsdale, Bergen County, New Jersey 07642; United States; 41.008285°N 74.028695°W

Information
- Type: Public high school
- Established: 1955
- School district: Pascack Valley Regional High School District
- NCES School ID: 341251000720
- Principal: John Puccio Jr.
- Faculty: 93.8 FTEs
- Grades: 9-12
- Enrollment: 955 (as of 2023–24)
- Student to teacher ratio: 10.2:1
- Colors: Kelly green and white
- Athletics conference: Big North Conference (general); North Jersey Super Football Conference (football)
- Team name: Panthers
- Publication: Outside/In (literature and art magazine)
- Newspaper: Smoke Signal
- Website: valley.pascack.org

Pascack Valley High School (PVHS) is a four-year comprehensive regional public high school located in Hillsdale in Bergen County, in the U.S. state of New Jersey, serving students in ninth through twelfth grades as one of two secondary schools in the Pascack Valley Regional High School District. Pascack Valley High School serves the residents of both Hillsdale and neighboring River Vale, while its counterpart Pascack Hills High School serves the communities of Woodcliff Lake and Montvale. As part of its 1:1 eLearning Initiative, the school has provided a laptop to every student, teacher, and administrator for educational use.

As of the 2023–24 school year, the school had an enrollment of 955 students and 93.8 classroom teachers (on an FTE basis), for a student–teacher ratio of 10.2:1. There were 12 students (1.3% of enrollment) eligible for free lunch and 8 (0.8% of students) eligible for reduced-cost lunch.

== History ==
Constructed at a cost of $1.25 million (equivalent to $15 million in 2025), the school opened in September 1955 with nearly 600 students, which was expected to jump to 800 by 1957 due to increases in the school-aged population. Prior to that, students from Hillsdale, Montvale and Woodcliff Lake had attended Park Ridge High School as part of sending/receiving relationships.

=== Principal's death ===
School principal Dr. Joseph Poli died suddenly in 1989. Among the many memorials to Dr. Poli was the renaming of the annual holiday girls' basketball tournament in his memory. The Joe Poli Tournament attracts top teams from across the region.

=== 1997 walkout ===
In 1997, in an act of support for the proposed school budget which was up for voter approval, up to 700 students (much of the student body) walked out of the school. In the previous three years, the budget had been voted down, and if it had gone down again, the school would have had to dismiss about a third of its teachers, including all who were under age 40. In addition to other local activist activities, such as handing out fliers encouraging people to vote up the budget, students staged a walkout which the local media were called to attend. Originally, the principal had planned to let students walk only to the back following an all-student meeting, but students took matters into their own hands when the leaders of the group led the walkout to the front. In the end, the budget passed.

=== 2008 child pornography scandal ===
In 2008, four freshman students were caught with nude pictures of underage girls. These pictures were shown to have been transmitted through school laptops.

=== 2008 death of principal ===
On January 29, 2008, the school district announced that following surgery on her knee, then-principal Dr. Barbara Sapienza had become comatose and that her recovery was uncertain. Assistant principal Thomas DeMaio took over as acting principal, and remained in that position following Dr. Sapienza's death on March 5, 2008. DeMaio was subsequently appointed principal in his own right.

=== 2015 white supremacy scandal ===
On May 10, 2015, an open letter from the school's Human Rights League was published on the website of the school's newspaper, The Smoke Signal. The letter referenced "incidents of racism" at the school, including a swastika being drawn on a hallway wall and white supremacy hand signs being flashed at sporting events. Media in northern New Jersey and nearby New York City picked up on the report, and the Anti-Defamation League visited with the school superintendent on Thursday, May 21. School officials revealed in media reports that five students were suspended, although the school would not make it clear what, if any, involvement these students had had in the incidents. To protest against white supremacy and to promote racial equality, school students put up a banner in the hallway, to be signed by students who wanted racial tolerance and diversity.

=== 2018 child pornography scandal ===
In January 2018, several freshman were found with nude pictures of their fellow students on their cellphones, and were found to be distributing and showing these photos to their classmates.

=== 2018 graffiti ===
During a Board of Education meeting on November 5, 2018, Gundersen addressed two Swastikas previously found on September 27 and October 18, 2018, both being located in separate boys' bathrooms. After finding the second Swastika in October in the second floor boys' bathroom, it was closed up, with Principal DeMaio stating it was closed due damage that needed to be repaired.

On November 6, 2018, it was announced that three additional Swastikas were found, leaving the locations unspecified. Plaques behind a baseball dugout were later found with, "homophobic slurs, racial slurs, and drug references, among other vulgar language" etched into them. DeMaio had previously asked for all the plaques to be removed, with only one being removed. After finding the hateful speech, all plaques were removed from the dugout.

On November 21, 2018, the students of Pascack Valley formed the shape of a heart on the football field and gave speeches, part of the "Movement of Unity" in order to, "foster unity throughout the PV community." Almost a month after the Swastikas were addressed, more Swastikas and racial slurs were found in Pascack Hills High School, with administrators addressing students on the matter. On December 4, 2018, another Swastika was found in a bathroom at George G. White Middle School, part of the Hillsdale Public Schools district. It was later announced that a minor had been charged involving the incident.

== Awards, recognition and rankings ==
The school was the 39th-ranked public high school in New Jersey out of 339 schools statewide in New Jersey Monthly magazine's September 2014 cover story on the state's "Top Public High Schools", using a new ranking methodology. The school had been ranked 73rd of 328 schools in the state in 2012, after being ranked 23rd in 2010 out of 322 schools listed. The magazine ranked the school 25th in 2008 out of 316 schools. The school was ranked 23rd in the magazine's September 2006 issue, which included 316 schools across the state. Schooldigger.com ranked the school tied for 49th out of 381 public high schools statewide in its 2011 rankings (a decrease of four positions from the 2010 ranking) which were based on the combined percentage of students classified as proficient or above proficient on the mathematics (91.8%) and language arts literacy (98.0%) components of the High School Proficiency Assessment (HSPA). In 2013, Pascack Valley earned a place on the AP District Honor Roll along with Pascack Hills and 475 schools across the US and Canada.

== 1:1 eLearning initiative ==
In the fall 2000, a program was proposed to provide a laptop to every student and teacher for educational purposes. A wireless network environment for the school was part of a referendum project. As the concept evolved, school representatives visited districts where such a program was already in place. The school's Steering Technology Committee was responsible for the logistics of the plan from 2000 forward.

For the 2004–05 school year, the school issued all its students laptops, and was the first public school in the state to do so. The laptops were issued by Sony and were put under a contractual lease for a period of four years, expiring in 2008. While the laptop program was hailed as a success by the administration, students largely differed in their opinions.

The school ceased use of the Sony Vaio laptops given to students and teachers during the years 2005–2007 in order to integrate 1.6 GHz MacBooks from Apple for the 2007–2008 school year. Several classes were used to test the students' abilities to adapt to Mac OS X Tiger OS interface and assess the laptops' value for use with school activities. The laptops featured all the standard Mac programs as well as having a digital camera built into the top of the screen. The "test runs" of the MacBooks were successful. Printer driver issues arose, but were addressed during the 2007–2008 school year.

== Campus ==
Pascack Valley High School has a wide range of facilities and a large campus, including a track (with a new surface as of the spring of 2006), surrounding an artificial turf football field. The school grounds also have eight tennis courts, a dance/recreational room equipped with a ballet barre, a softball field, a weight room, and one baseball field. The school has two levels and is mainly arranged in a rectangular fashion.

The campus underwent major renovations in 2005 that added several wings and a total overhaul of the athletic complex and auditorium.

https://team1676.comhttps://team1676.com==Extracurricular activities==

Like most other area high schools, Pascack Valley offers a wide range of co-curricular and extracurricular activities, including: m

== Athletics ==
The Pascack Valley High School Panthers compete in the Big North Conference, which is comprised of public and private high schools in Bergen and Passaic counties, and was established following a reorganization of sports leagues in Northern New Jersey by the New Jersey State Interscholastic Athletic Association (NJSIAA). Prior to the NJSIAA's realignment in 2010, the school had participated in the North Bergen Interscholastic Athletic League. With 908 students in grades 10–12, the school was classified by the NJSIAA for the 2019–20 school year as Group III for most athletic competition purposes, which included schools with an enrollment of 761 to 1,058 students in that grade range. The football team competes in the Patriot Red division of the North Jersey Super Football Conference, which includes 112 schools competing in 20 divisions, making it the nation's biggest football-only high school sports league. The school was classified by the NJSIAA as Group III North for football for 2024–2026, which included schools with 700 to 884 students. There are 10 boys' interscholastic sports activities and seven girls' interscholastic sports activities.

The school participates as the host school / lead agency in joint cooperative ice hockey and boys / girls swimming teams with Pascack Hills High School, while Pascack Hills is the host school for a joint gymnastics team. These co-op programs operate under agreements scheduled to expire at the end of the 2023–24 school year.

School colors are Kelly green and white. Interscholastic sports offered by the school include:

Fall sports

- Cheerleading: Varsity, JV
- Cross Country (B&G): Varsity, JV, Freshmen
- Dance: Varsity, JV
- Football: Varsity, JV, Freshmen
- Gymnastics: Varsity
- Soccer (B&G): Varsity, JV, Freshmen
- Tennis (G): Varsity, JV
- Volleyball (G): Varsity, JV, Freshmen

Winter sports

- Basketball (B&G): Varsity, JV, Freshmen
- Bowling (B&G): Varsity, JV, Freshmen
- Cheerleading: Varsity
- Dance: Varsity, JV
- Ice Hockey: Varsity, JV
- Swimming (B&G): Varsity
- Winter Track (B&G): Varsity, JV, Freshmen
- Wrestling: Varsity, JV, Freshmen

Spring sports

- Baseball: Varsity, JV, Freshmen
- Golf (B&G): Varsity, JV
- Boys Lacrosse: Varsity, JV
- Girls Lacrosse: Varsity, JV, Freshmen
- Softball: Varsity, JV, Freshmen
- Tennis (B): Varsity, JV
- Track & Field (B&G): Varsity, JV, Freshman

The school has had considerable success in basketball and football.

The boys track team won the spring / outdoor track title as Group III champion in 1961 and 1965 (as co-champion). The boys track team was the indoor track Group III in 1965.

The girls' basketball team, led since 1972 by New Jersey's winningest girls' basketball coach, Jeff Jasper, has won 30 consecutive league titles (1979 through 2008), and seven county championships to go along with multiple state titles. The girls' basketball team won the Group III state championship in 1981 (vs. Camden Catholic High School), 1982 (vs. North Hunterdon High School), 1989 (vs. Mainland Regional High School) and 2017 (vs. Ocean City High School), and the Group II title in 2005 (vs. Rumson-Fair Haven High School) and 2008 (vs. Rumson-Fair Haven). The program's six state titles are tied for eighth-most in the state. The 1981 team became the first girls team to finish the season with victories after defeating Camden Catholic by a score of 58–52 in the Group II final. In 2008, Pascack Valley won the Group II state title with a 58–52 win against Rumson-Fair Haven, qualifying for the state Tournament of Champions, and giving Jasper the 800th coaching victory. Jasper was inducted by the New Jersey State Interscholastic Athletic Association into its Bollinger High School Hall of Fame in 2006. The 2010 girls' basketball team was NBIL champions and won the North I, Group III state sectional title, defeating top-seed Teaneck High School 51–47. Jasper earned his 900th win in January 2013, joining Bob Hurley as the only other coach in state history to reach that mark. On January 11, 2018, Jasper earned his 1,000th career coaching victory with a 73–25 win against Northern Highlands Regional High School, becoming the first girls basketball coach in New Jersey to reach this milestone, joining Hurley again as the only other high school basketball coach in New Jersey with 1,000 or more wins.

The boys cross country running team won the Group III state championship in 1973.

The football team, coached by Len Cusumano, has made 14 state playoff appearances all-time, including seven sectional final appearances, and three sectional titles (1990, 2013, and 2014): Former coach Craig Nielsen led Pascack Valley to their 2013 and 2014 titles and compiled a 119–46 record during his 15 seasons (2001–15) as head coach.

- 1989 (Final North I, Group III)
- 1990 (Champions North I, Group III with a 14–0 win against Wayne Valley High School)
- 1999 (Quarterfinals North I, Group III)
- 2004 8-3 (Semi-Finals North I, Group II; NBIL Division 2 Champions)
- 2005 10-1 (Semi-Finals North I, Group II; NBIL Division 2 Champions)
- 2006 10-2 (Final North I, Group II; NBIL Division 2 Champions)
- 2007 8-4 (Final North I, Group II; NBIL Division 2 Champions)
- 2008 9-2 (Semi-Finals North I, Group III; NBIL Division 2 Champions)
- 2009 8-2 (Quarterfinals North I, Group III; NBIL Division 2 Champions)
- 2010 5-5 (Quarterfinals North I, Group III)
- 2011 9-2 (Semi-Finals North I, Group III; Big North Independence Division Champions)
- 2012 11-1 (Final North I, Group IV; Big North Independence Division Champions)
- 2013 10-2 (Champions North I, Group IV with a 32–8 win against Paramus High School; Big North Independence Division Champions)
- 2014 10-2 (Champions North I, Group IV with a 22–6 win against Paramus High School)
- 2015 8-3 (Semi-Finals North I, Group III)

The girls' tennis team won the Group II state championship in 2003, defeating Haddonfield Memorial High School in the final match of the tournament.

The ice hockey team won the McMullen Cup in 2004 with a 5–0 win in the tournament final against Northern Highlands Regional High School.

The girls' volleyball team won the Group II state championship in 2005, defeating Northern Valley Regional High School at Demarest in the final match of the tournament.

The girls' soccer team won the Group II state championship in 2005 as co-champion with Haddonfield Memorial High School.

The gymnastics team won state titles in 2008 and 2009, and was selected by The Record as Team of the Year in 2009.

The boys' wrestling team won the North I Group III state sectional championship in 2018.

The Pascack Valley Regional Dance Team has been the National Grand Champions for the past two years at the National Dance Alliance Championship. In 2007 they were state champions as well. The Pascack Valley Regional Dance Team was on the cover of the February 2008 issue of The Record's Sports Magazine. In 2008 they took home two first-place trophies in the Large Pom and Small Team Performance categories at the NDA National Championship. They were state champions in 2008 and 2014 as well.

=== Mascot controversy ===
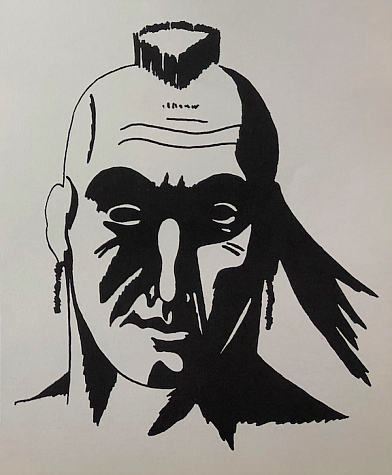
PVHS's former 'Indian Head' mascot, depicted in 1966. The mascot was phased out starting in 2015. The district's board of education formally retired the 'Indian' team name and logo on June 22, 2020.

The school's mascot was an Indian. In 2004, there was a major controversy at the school about the appropriateness of the mascot. The school took up the issue after researching high schools and colleges around the U.S. with similar nicknames that had decided to change their mascots. Many of these schools had received complaints from Native American groups about the stereotypes that the mascots reinforced. The student council also discussed rumors that New Jersey would be banning Native American-related mascots, and eventually it was decided that taking up the issue by choice rather than force was the right thing to do. After months of public debate and an official symposium in which students voiced opinions from both sides of the issue, a vote was held among the students and faculty and the motion to keep the Indian was affirmed, 67% voting in favor of keeping the mascot.

In 2015, the school district decided to change the logo to one using the initials "PV" while deferring a decision on the mascot name.

In June 2020 the district board of education voted to eliminate both the PVHS "Indians" and the "Cowboys" at Pascack Hills High School.

New mascot for Pascack Valley High School as of Oct. 2021.

In March 2021, the board of education ratified new team names that had been selected by a vote of students and staff at each school, with Pascack Hills being renamed the Broncos and Pascack Valley adopting the Panthers as its new team name.

In October 2021, a school committee reached a consensus on two mascot choices, leaving the final selection to students and staff. The panther logo that won received 83.5% of the votes.

== Student government ==
The Pascack Valley High School Student Government Association consists of five councils. Each grade has a class council, and the PVHS Executive Council governs the entire student body. Each council consists of a President, Vice President, Secretary, Treasurer, and eight elected and appointed representatives. In 1996, two district students, Matt Kracinovich of Pascack Hills, and Ryan Shell of Pascack Valley, successfully lobbied the Board of Education to accept a special student representative from each school to sit on the board. In the following year, the 1997–1998 school year, Kracinovich and Shell became the first students to occupy the new positions officially known as the Non-Voting Student Members of the Board of Education.

The Executive Council recommends appropriation of funds for student activities, with the approval of the Board, for the school. It is also deeply involved in organizing activities and events for the school. The next step down the ladder of the student government consists of the four class councils, which participate in the running and operations of the school with the Executive Council, but represent and are responsible to the electing class.

Elections to the class councils are held at the end of every year for various positions, and in the fall for the freshman class. There are two positions to which candidates must be appointed. The Executive Council, which is separate from the constituent class councils, holds elections in the spring.

== Demographics and curriculum ==
- 99% of the senior students of the past year received a diploma.
- 96% of the seniors planned to attend college.
- As of the 2009–10 school year, four world languages are offered: Spanish, French, Chinese and Italian.
- 15 Advanced Placement (AP) classes are offered: AP Computer Science, AP Biology, AP Calculus AB, AP Calculus BC, AP Chemistry, AP English Language and Composition, AP English Literature and Composition, AP European History, AP Projects in Music Theory, AP French Language, AP United States Government, AP Physics B, AP Spanish Language, AP Statistics, and AP United States History.
- Pascack Valley participates in the Honors program.

== Administration ==
The school's principal is John Puccio Jr. His core administration team includes two assistant principals.

== Notable alumni ==
- Brooke Ammerman (born 1990), ice hockey forward who was the first player to score a goal in Metropolitan Riveters history
- Sal Cenicola (born 1960), professional boxer recognized by the Guinness Book of World Records for the longest interval between professional boxing matches
- Richard Cottingham (born 1946), serial killer active between 1967 and 1980 variously known as "The Butcher of Times Square" or "The Torso Killer"
- Tyler Cowen (born 1962), economist, author and blogger
- Rob Delaney, (born 1984), pitcher in the Tampa Bay Rays' organization
- Peter Enns (born 1961), Old Testament scholar
- Dan Fogelman (born 1976), screenwriter for multiple TV shows and movies, including This is Us, Tangled and the Cars franchise
- Jeff Phillips (born 1968), fitness trainer and former actor best known for his work in Guiding Light, As the World Turns and the 1996 film Independence Day
- David Remnick (born 1958), editor for The New Yorker who was the editor-in-chief of Smoke Signal while in high school
- Jenn Tran (born 1997, class of 2016), star of season 21 of The Bachelorette
- Gary Tuchman (born 1960, class of 1978), staff correspondent for CNN's weeknight Anderson Cooper 360° TV show
- Jesse Van Saun (born 1976), retired soccer player who played professionally in Major League Soccer and USISL
- Heather Zurich (born 1987), former Rutgers University women's basketball player
