= North Bergen Interscholastic Athletic League =

The North Bergen Interscholastic Athletic League, abbreviated NBIL or NBIAL, was an athletic conference of twelve high schools located in the northern part of Bergen County, New Jersey. Wayne Hills High School, located in Wayne, Passaic County, New Jersey, was the only school not located in Bergen County.

== Member schools ==
There are twelve member NBIAL schools, which are split up into two divisions. Division 1 is made up of all Group III schools, while Division 2 is made up of Group II schools. Group is a classification of the school size as determined by the New Jersey State Interscholastic Athletic Association (NJSIAA). The bigger the Group, the more students that go to that school.

The league had originally eight members. Lodi was added to the NBIL in the late 1960's and later the league added Westwood and Wayne Hills in the mid-1970s. It expanded further, adding Bergenfield and Fair Lawn in the early 1990s, and split into two divisions for most sports. Mahwah replaced Westwood when the latter left the league, and Ramsey replaced longtime league member River Dell.

After the original NJSIAA realignment in 2009, Paramus Catholic High School was added to the NBIL while Wayne Hills and Fair Lawn left to join the North Jersey Tri-County Conference. The NBIL ceased to exist following the 2009–10 seasons, and its remaining member institutions joined with most of the NJTCC schools to form the Big North Conference. Pascack Hills, who participated in the NBIL in every sport except for football (where they were a member of the Bergen County Scholastic League), was the only school that did not and followed its football conferencemates to the North Jersey Interscholastic Conference; they eventually reconsidered and moved to the Big North in 2012.

== Division 1 ==
School	Location	School District	Team Name	Classification
Fair Lawn High School	Fair Lawn	Fair Lawn Public Schools	Cutters	North I, Group III
Northern Highlands Regional High School	Allendale	Northern Highlands Regional High School	Highlanders	North I, Group III
Northern Valley Regional High School at Demarest	Demarest	Northern Valley Regional High School District	Norsemen	North I, Group III
Northern Valley Regional High School at Old Tappan	Old Tappan	Northern Valley Regional High School District	Golden Knights	North I, Group III
Ramapo High School	Franklin Lakes	Ramapo Indian Hills Regional High School District	Raiders	North I, Group III
Wayne Hills High School	Wayne	Wayne Public Schools	Patriots	North I, Group III

(Note: Wayne Valley High School, despite belonging to the same school district as Wayne Hills High School, is not part of the NBIL.)

== Division 2 ==
School	Location	School District	Team Name	Classification
Bergenfield High School	Bergenfield	Bergenfield Public Schools	Bears	North I, Group III
Indian Hills High School	Oakland	Ramapo Indian Hills Regional High School District	Braves	North I, Group II
Pascack Hills High School	Montvale	Pascack Valley Regional High School District	Cowboys	North I, Group II
Pascack Valley High School	Hillsdale	Pascack Valley Regional High School District	Indians	North I, Group II
Ramsey High School	Ramsey	Ramsey Public School District	Rams	North I, Group II

(Note: Pascack Hills High School did not participate in the NBIL for football.)

== League sports ==
The North Bergen Interscholastic Athletic League allows member schools to compete with each other in many sports spread out among three seasons. Although the league does not have a cheerleading division, many member schools have their own cheerleading teams. Other sports, such as fencing, are offered by some schools, but like cheerleading, are not included as part of the NBIL.

The following is a list of the sports that the NBIL offers. Some sports do not have a team from every school, while other sports have teams from all twelve schools. Each bullet is technically an individual team, but in sports marked with an asterisk (*), these two teams usually practice together (depending on the school and sport) and have almost every if not all of their meets, games, matches, competitions, and other events at the same time. (For example, although the boys and girls track teams from a single school usually practice together and have meets at the same time, there are separate events at their meets for boys and for girls; therefore, the teams compete and score separately.)

=== Fall sports ===
- Cross Country (Boys)*
- Cross Country (Girls)*
- Football - NOTE: Pascack Hills plays football in the Carpenter Division of the Bergen-Passaic Scholastic League.
- Soccer (Boys)
- Soccer (Girls)
- Tennis (Girls)
- Volleyball (Girls)

=== Winter sports ===
- Basketball (Boys)
- Basketball (Girls)
- Bowling (Boys)*
- Bowling (Girls)*
- Fencing*
- Ice Hockey
- Swimming (Boys)*
- Swimming (Girls)*
- Winter Guard
- Winter Track (Boys)*
- Winter Track (Girls)*
- Wrestling

=== Spring sports ===
- Baseball
- Golf (Boys)*
- Golf (Girls)*
- Lacrosse
- Softball
- Tennis (Boys)
- Track and Field (Boys)*
- Track and Field (Girls)*
- Volleyball (Boys)

== League Code of Conduct ==
The NBIL encourages parents and spectators to support good sportsmanship and to be positive role models to student athletes. Smoking is not allowed (per NBIL rules, some local laws, and state legislation) at NBIL events. Spectators are asked to "enthusiastically encourage" their own teams, to refrain from booing and using negative remarks, and to applaud "outstanding play" by any team. State and NBIL regulations prohibit noisemakers, signs, and banners at competitions.
