= Sal Cenicola =

American boxer (1959–2021)

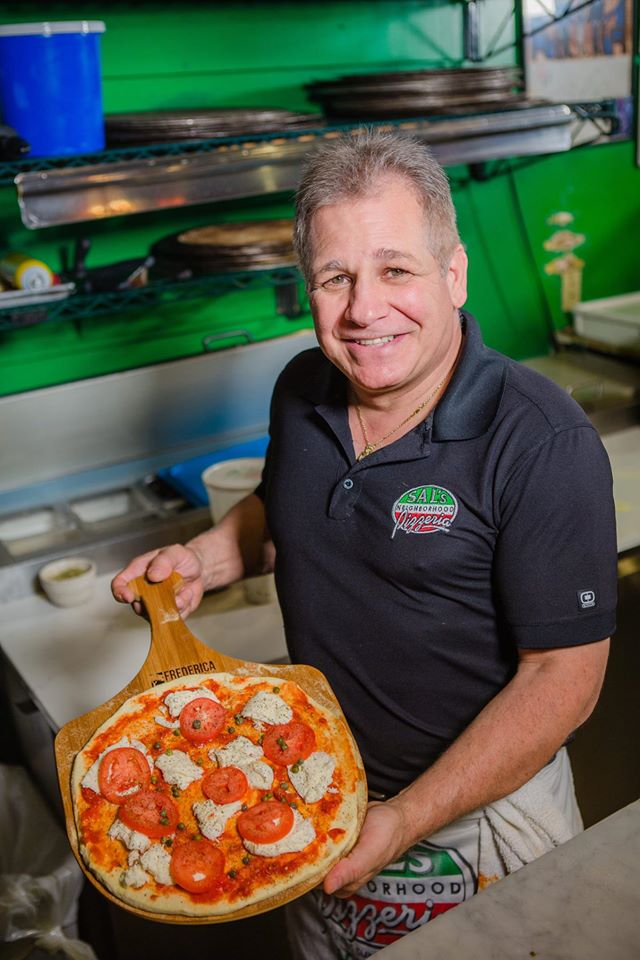
- Cenicola at his restaurant in 2015

Personal information
- Nickname: Rocky
- Nationality: American
- Born: Salvatore Cenicola III; July 13, 1959 Teaneck, New Jersey, U.S.
- Died: August 31, 2021 (aged 62) St. Simons, Georgia, U.S.
- Height: 5 ft 7 in (170 cm)
- Weight: Lightweight

Boxing career
- Reach: 68 in (173 cm)
- Stance: Orthodox

Boxing record
- Total fights: 22
- Wins: 19
- Win by KO: 11
- Losses: 2
- Draws: 0
- No contests: 1

Salvatore "Sal" "Rocky" Cenicola III (July 13, 1959 – August 31, 2021) was an American former professional boxer, restaurateur and actor. He holds a record in the Guinness Book of World Records for the longest interval between professional boxing matches, (25 years and 66 days) which was set on April 13, 2013, and is a 2012 inductee into the New Jersey Boxing Hall of Fame.

== Early years ==
Salvatore Cenicola III was born July 13, 1959, at Holy Name Hospital in Teaneck, New Jersey. His parents Salvatore U. Cenicola II and Maria Boccanfuso are both of Italian descent. Cenicola grew up in River Vale, New Jersey, and attended Pascack Valley High School, where he competed in interscholastic wrestling.

Cenicola started boxing in 1975 and was trained by amateur trainer Eddie Helbig. In 1976 Cenicola entered and won the New Jersey Golden Gloves championship at 125 lbs. In 1977 he won the Blue and White Gloves NJ State Championship at 125 lbs. And in 1977 he won the AAU State Championship at Featherweight. Also, in 1977 Cenicola did well in National AAU Championships but was disqualified in the Quarter Finals for "Using a professional style in an amateur fight". In 1978 Cenicola enlisted in the U.S. Army where he won the "Outstanding Soldier of the Cycle" for his Basic Training. He would go on to represent the NJ Gladiators/USA Boxing Team in international bouts. Among his most notable wins was against Ireland's Sean Doyle, Ireland's national champion. In 1979, Cenicola began to train with the US Olympic Boxing team. He trained until his left shoulder was injured in February 1980, just 3 weeks before the Olympic Trials team was set to fly to Poland for an exhibition match. Cenicola was taken off of the team because of the injury and never made the trip to Poland. On March 14, 1980, LOT Flight 7, which originated at JFK Airport in New York, NY, crashed in Warsaw, Poland, from engine failure. All 77 passengers and 10 crew members, including many of the USA Olympic Boxing Team, were killed.

== Professional boxing career ==
In 1982 Cenicola became a professional with his first bout against Gary Gamble at the Sands Casino in Atlantic City, NJ. The fight was televised on ESPN. Cenicola initially was declared the loser of the fight after suffering a cut over his right eye from a clash of heads with Gamble in the second round. The NJ Athletic commission however, overturned the loss two days later and changed it to a "No Contest" result.

Cenicola went on to win his next 18 fights in a row, being trained in part by Lou Duva, Chickie Ferrara, Allie Stoltz, Richie Giachetti, Don Turner and Johnnie Torres. Cenicola fought under the promotional banners of Top Rank Boxing, Main Events and Tiger Eye. His most notable win was a hard-fought decision against Robert "Choo Choo" Dixon on September 12, 1986, at the Omni New Daisy Theater in Memphis, Tennessee. Cenicola received a perforated eardrum and a torn retina and received more than 100 stitches for cuts he received during the fight but managed a unanimous decision, taking his record to 18–0 with 11 KO's. He was ranked in the top ten as a lightweight in the world in 1986.

After two straight losses to Bryant Paden on August 27, 1987, and to the number one contender Louie Lomeli on February 6, 1988, Cenciola retired at the age of 28 on February 7, 1988.

In November 2012 Cenicola announced that he would come out of retirement to fight once again against Nathan Petty of Louisville, KY in a 4-round fight in the Middleweight Division. On April 13, 2013, Cenicola fought against Nathan Petty in a fight sanctioned by the Florida State Athletic Commission on a worldwide webcast broadcast on LDLTV. Cenicola won a 4-round unanimous decision. On January 15, 2014, Sal Cenicola was certified by the Guinness Book of World Records as an official record holder for "The Longest Interval between Professional Boxing matches by a fighter: 25 Years and 66 Days". Cenicola retired again for the second time shortly thereafter.

== Post fight career ==
Cenicola owned and operated Sal's Neighborhood Pizzeria and Ristorante Italiano in St. Simons Island, GA from 2006 until 2020. Cenicola also became an actor most recently taking a role in the Ben Affleck movie: Live By Night. Cenicola plays Gangster Lou Orimo. Cenicola was also active in local theatre playing the lead role as Samual Katz in the St. Simons Players Production of The Cemetery Club. In 2017 Cenicola portrayed a police officer in Neil Simon's "Rumors" which is also produced by Island Players in St Simons Island, GA.

== Personal life ==
Cenicola had two sons: Salvatore IV and Nicholas Cenicola. Cenicola lived in St. Simons Island, GA and died August 31, 2021, in St Simons Island, Georgia.

No.	Result	Record	Opponent	Type	Round, time	Date	Location	Notes
22	Win	19–2–0 (1)	Nathan Petty	UD	4	Apr 13, 2013	Peck Center, Fernandina Beach, Florida, U.S.	Guinness World Record - Longest Interval Between Professional Fights 25 Years 66 days
21	Loss	18–2–0 (1)	Louie Lomeli	KO	2 (10), 1:51	Feb 6, 1988	(United States) Convention Center, Atlantic City, NJ, U.S.	
20	Loss	18-1–0 (1)	Bryant Paden	MD	10	Aug 27, 1987	(United States) Sand Hotel, Atlantic City, NJ, U.S.	
19	Win	18-0-0(1)	Robert Dixon	UD	10	Sept 2, 1986	Omni New Daisy Theatre, Memphis, TN US	
18	Win	17-0-0(1)	Dwayne Brooks	TKO	4	Aug 15, 1986	Park Center, Charlotte, NC US	
17	Win	16-0-0(1)	Jimmy Magnifico	TKO	8	Apr 6, 1986	Essex Racquet Club, East Orange, NJ US	
16	Win	15-0-0(1)	Antonio Rutledge	UD	8	May 20, 1985	Tangier Restaurant, Akron, OH US	
15	Win	14-0-0(1)	Charles Williams	KO	1	May 9, 1985	South Mountain Arena, West Orange, NJ US	
14	Win	13-0-0(1)	Alfonso Mitchell	RTD	3	Dec 4, 1984	Covered Wagon Inn, Wayne, PA US	
13	Win	12-0-0(1)	Joe Pickett	UD	8	Oct 25, 1984	Ice World, Totowa, NJ US	
12	Win	11-0-0(1)	Antonio Rutledge	UD	6	Jul 6, 1984	Civic Auditorium, Canton OH, US	
11	Win	10-0-0 (1)	Willie Fisher	KO	2	June 7, 1984	Ice World Totowa, NJ, US	
10	Win	9-0-0(1)	Angelo Lewis	TKO	1	May 23, 1984	UAW Hall Parma, OH, US	
9	Win	8-0-0 (1)	Levi Elbaum	UD	6	Dec 27, 1983	Tropcana Hotel and Casino, Atlantic City, NJ, US	
8	Win	7-0-0 (1)	Glen Sample	TKO	2	Nov 3, 1983	Bally's Park Place Hotel Casino Atlantic City, NJ US	
7	Win	6-0-0 (1)	Willie Fisher	KO	3	Jul 27, 1983	Plaza Forum, Hazelton Township, PA, US	
6	Win	5-0-0 (1)	Dwight Hobson	UD	6	Jul 14, 1983	Ice World, Totowa, NJ, US	
5	Win	4-0-0 (1)	Wayne Bingham	TKO	2	June 24, 1983	Plaza Forum, Hazelton Township, PA US	
4	Win	3-0-0 (1)	Frank Wade	KO	2	May 26, 1983	Sands Casino, Atlantic City, NJ, US	
3	Win	2-0-0 (1)	James Woodhouse	UD	4	Apr 24, 1983	Showboat Hotel Casino, Atlantic City, NJ, US	
2	Win	1-0-0 (1)	Billy Dean Melton	TKO	1	Nov 18, 1982	Sands Casino, Atlantic City, NJ, US	
1	NC	0-0-0(1)	Gary Gamble	NC	3	Aug 26, 1982	Sands Casino, Atlantic City, NJ, US	Cenicoia was the recipient of unintentional headbutt 3rd Round. Initially a TKO was declared with Gamble as the winner it was later Overturned to a NC
