= Kevin Haslam (American football player) =

American football player (born 1986)

No. 72, 70
- Position: Offensive tackle

Personal information
- Born: November 8, 1986 (age 39); Mahwah, New Jersey, U.S.
- Listed height: 6 ft 5 in (1.96 m)
- Listed weight: 310 lb (141 kg)

Career information
- College: Rutgers
- NFL draft: 2010: undrafted

Career history
- Jacksonville Jaguars (2010−2011); Oakland Raiders (2012)*; San Diego Chargers (2012); New England Patriots (2013)*; Detroit Lions (2013)*
- * Offseason or practice squad member only

Career NFL statistics
- Games played: 10
- Games started: 3
- Stats at Pro Football Reference

Kevin Haslam (born November 8, 1986) is an American former professional football player who was an offensive tackle in the National Football League (NFL). He was signed by the Jacksonville Jaguars as an undrafted free agent in 2010. He played college football for the Rutgers Scarlet Knights.

== Professional career ==
=== Jacksonville Jaguars ===
Haslam was signed as an undrafted free agent by the Jacksonville Jaguars after the 2010 NFL draft. Haslam and two other undrafted free agents made the Jaguars' opening day roster. He played in five games for the Jaguars before being put on injured reserve. He was released on March 13, 2012.

=== Oakland Raiders ===
Haslam was signed by the Oakland Raiders on May 13, 2012, but was released on August 31, 2012, in the final wave of roster cuts.

=== San Diego Chargers ===
Haslam was signed by the San Diego Chargers on September 4, 2012, as the final member of the practice squad. He was promoted to the active squad in week 12 and played in five games for the Chargers, starting three at left tackle. He was released on May 21, 2013, to make room on the roster for Max Starks.

=== New England Patriots ===
Haslam was claimed off waivers by the New England Patriots on May 23, 2013. On August 15, 2013, he was released by the Patriots.

=== Detroit Lions ===
On August 18, 2013, Haslam was signed by the Detroit Lions. He was cut on August 31.

== Personal life ==
He resides in Mahwah, New Jersey. He attended Mahwah High School.
