= Pascack Hills High School =

High school in Bergen County, New Jersey, US

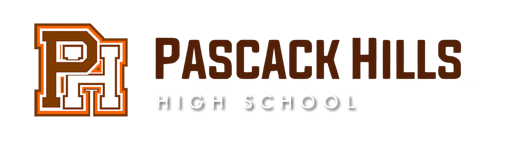

Location
- 225 West Grand Avenue; Montvale, Bergen County, New Jersey 07645; United States; 41.049372°N 74.049799°W

Information
- Type: Public high school
- Established: September 1964
- School district: Pascack Valley Regional High School District
- NCES School ID: 341251000718
- Principal: Christine Pollinger
- Faculty: 77.8 FTEs
- Grades: 9-12
- Enrollment: 768 (as of 2024–25)
- Student to teacher ratio: 9.9:1
- Campus type: Suburban
- Colors: Brown white and orange
- Athletics conference: North Jersey Interscholastic Conference (general); North Jersey Super Football Conference (football)
- Team name: Broncos (known as the Cowboys from 1964 to 2021)
- Newspaper: The Trailblazer
- Yearbook: Wrangler
- Website: hills.pascack.org

Pascack Hills High School (PHHS) is a four-year comprehensive public high school, one of two secondary schools serving students in ninth through twelfth grade as part of the Pascack Valley Regional High School District in Bergen County, in the U.S. state of New Jersey. Pascack Hills serves the residents of both Montvale, where the campus is located, and the neighboring community of Woodcliff Lake. The other high school in the district is Pascack Valley High School, which serves the communities of Hillsdale and River Vale.

As of the 2024–25 school year, the school had an enrollment of 768 students and 77.8 classroom teachers (on an FTE basis), for a student–teacher ratio of 9.9:1. There were 12 students (1.6% of enrollment) eligible for free lunch and 3 (0.4% of students) eligible for reduced-cost lunch.

== History ==
The school opened in September 1964, having been built to alleviate crowding at the district's original facility, Pascack Valley High School, which had been opened in 1955. Constructed at a cost of $2.9 million (equivalent to $30.1 million in 2025), the facility was designed with a system of folding walls that could be adjusted to handle student groups of varying sizes. The district received a $12,000 grant from a unit of the Ford Foundation that would allow the school to use IT&T computer systems run by a senior program analyst from that firm that would allow students to select classes on their own. The school spent its first five decades relatively unchanged in terms of architecture. In 2006, an extra gym was added. Most recently, the new science wing was opened as well as a new entrance building. This school is one of the first locally to provide every student with a laptop, which can be taken home, and be used in school every day. Every classroom is fitted with a wireless access point (IEEE 802.11 a/g/n), which provides the students with internet. For the 2007–08 school year, the school upgraded all of its laptop computers to Apple MacBooks.

== Awards, recognition and rankings ==
Pascack Hills High School was the 7th-ranked public high school in New Jersey out of 339 schools statewide in New Jersey Monthly magazine's September 2014 cover story on the state's "Top Public High Schools", using a new ranking methodology. The school had been ranked 18th in the state of 328 schools in 2012, after being ranked 7th in 2010 out of 322 schools listed. The magazine ranked the school 12th in 2008 and was ranked 8th in the magazine's September 2006 issue, which included 316 schools across the state. The school's peak rating by New Jersey Monthly was in 2001 at 2nd. Schooldigger.com ranked the school 46th out of 381 public high schools statewide in its 2011 rankings (a decrease of 29 positions from the 2010 ranking) which were based on the combined percentage of students classified as proficient or above proficient on the mathematics (93.0%) and language arts literacy (97.0%) components of the High School Proficiency Assessment (HSPA).

In its 2013 report on "America's Best High Schools", The Daily Beast ranked the school 345th in the nation among participating public high schools and 27th among schools in New Jersey.

In the 2011 "Ranking America's High Schools" issue by The Washington Post, the school was ranked 62nd in New Jersey and 1,782nd nationwide. In Newsweek's May 22, 2007 issue, ranking the country's top high schools, Pascack Hills High School was listed in 1194th place, the 40th-highest ranked school in New Jersey.

As of February 2024, U.S. News & World Report ranked Pascack Hills as the No. 968 High School nationwide, and No. 42 within New Jersey.

As of February 2024, Niche (company) ranked Pascack Hills as the No. 95 public school within New Jersey.

== Campus ==
Pascack Hills High School's athletic facilities include a regulation size track, a turf football field named for long-time principal Bart DiPaola, four tennis courts, a combination softball and baseball field that can be utilized for soccer, and two gymnasiums, which house basketball and volleyball.

== Academics ==
Students at Pascack Hills High School are required to take four years of English, three years of mathematics, two years of world language, three years of science, and three years of social studies in order to graduate. In addition, the class of 2014 and beyond must successfully complete a half year of the state-mandated Financial Literacy course. The school offers Spanish, French, Italian, Chinese, and ESL courses for their world language program. The AP courses offered to students for the 2015 to 2016 academic year are AP English III, AP English IV, AP US History (divided into the students' sophomore and junior years), AP World History, AP Calculus, AP Environmental Science, AP Computer Science, AP Statistics, AP Biology, AP Chemistry, AP Physics, AP Spanish Language, AP French Language, AP Studio Art, and AP Art History. The school also offers an array of Virtual High School courses via an online option. "Virtual schooldays" are part of the plan.

== Athletics ==
The Pascack Hills Broncos compete in Colonial Division A of the North Jersey Interscholastic Conference (NJIC), which is comprised of public and private high schools located in Bergen, Hudson and Passaic counties, and was established following a reorganization of sports leagues in Northern New Jersey by the New Jersey State Interscholastic Athletic Association (NJSIAA). Before the 2010 realignment, the school was one of the 12 high schools participating in the North Bergen Interscholastic Athletic League (NBIL/NBIAL). With 607 students in grades 10–12, the school was classified by the NJSIAA for the 2019–20 school year as Group II for most athletic competition purposes, which included schools with an enrollment of 486 to 758 students in that grade range. The football team competes in the American Red division of the North Jersey Super Football Conference, which includes 112 schools competing in 20 divisions, making it the nation's biggest football-only high school sports league. The school was classified by the NJSIAA as Group II North for football for 2024–2026, which included schools with 484 to 683 students.

Formerly known as the "Cowboys", while Pascack Valley was the "Indians", the old team names were eliminated by the district at a July 2020 board meeting. In March 2021, the Board of Education ratified new team names that had been selected by a vote of students and staff at each school, with Pascack Hills being renamed the Broncos and Pascack Valley adopting the Panthers as its new team name.

In 2004, the football team joined the Bergen-Passaic Scholastic League (BPSL), to play against other schools of similar enrollment size. Citing lower enrollment, and the loss of Hillsdale and portions of River Vale to Pascack Valley as a result of redistricting, Pascack Hills left the North Bergen Interscholastic Athletic League (NBIAL) for football only and played an independent schedule for two seasons, as PHHS was classified by the NJSIAA as a Group I school (the smallest of the four classifications) and all of the other schools in the league were Group II or Group III schools. Prior to the NJSIAA's realignment that took effect in the fall of 2010, Pascack Hills was a member of the NBIAL for most sports. Pascack Hills is the only former NBIAL school in the NJIC, joining Queen of Peace High School and Rutherford High School as the only two schools moved to the NJIC that had not come directly from the Bergen County Scholastic League National / Olympic divisions or from the BPSL.

School colors are brown and white with orange. Sports offered include cheerleading, dance, cross-country, football, boys' and girls' soccer, tennis, volleyball, gymnastics, basketball, bowling, ice hockey, swimming, wrestling, Winter Track, baseball, softball, and lacrosse.

The school participates as the host school / lead agency in a joint cooperative gymnastics team with Pascack Valley High School, while Pascack Valley is the host school for ice hockey and boys / girls swimming teams. These co-op programs operate under agreements scheduled to expire at the end of the 2023–24 school year.

=== Football ===
In 1979, the football team completed an 11–0 undefeated season and won the North I Group III state sectional championship, the program's first title, with a 24–14 victory over previously unbeaten Hoboken High School in the championship game, played in front of a crowd of 4,000 at Giants Stadium. That Hoboken team was coached by Ed Stinson, who would eventually become the Cowboys head coach during the 1980s.

In 2005, under the leadership of Head Coach Brooks Alexander, the football team reached the playoffs for the first time in 13 seasons, losing to No. 3 seed Bogota High School in the first round by a score of 41–7. In his six-year tenure, Alexander has become one of the most successful football coaches in school history and only the second football coach in school history to lead the Cowboys to the playoffs on two separate occasions, the first being Bill Lally in 1978 and 1979. At the end of the 2005 season Alexander was named the All-Suburban Coach of the Year.

In 2006, the football team reached the playoffs for the second year in a row, this time being beaten 9–3 in a close defensive battle against the fourth-seeded Hasbrouck Heights High School Aviators. The Cowboys finished 2006 with a 7–3 record. Senior defensive leaders Dan Avento (Monmouth University) and Evan Lampert (Rutgers University) were recruited to Division I schools. The Cowboys clinched their first Conference championship since 1996 by claiming the B.P.S.L. King Division title. Coach Alexander was named both the B.P.S.L. Coach of the Year and the National Football Foundation Coach of the Year.

In 2009, the football team once again reached the playoffs under Coach Alexander. With a regular season record of 7–2 (losses to Hasbrouck Heights High School and Bogota High School), the Cowboys would go and play Ramsey High School (the future 2009 state champions) and lose by a score of 35–6 in the North I, Group II tournament.

In 2010, the Cowboys won the N.J.I.C. conference championship. The Cowboys again made the state playoffs, losing to Ramsey, for the second year in a row, in the first round of the North I Group II state playoffs. The Cowboys finished the season with a win over Glen Rock High School at the return of the Thanksgiving Day Game, finishing the season with a 7–3 record. Head Coach Brooks Alexander won Coach of the Year honors for the fourth time.

=== Wrestling ===
Pascack Hills was the number one ranked wrestling team in the United States in 1977, and was selected by The Record as its Team of the Century. Coach Bucky Rehain received numerous awards during his long successful career, including recognition by the National Wrestling Coaches Association in 1984 as its Coach of the Year.

The wrestling team won the North I Group III state sectional title in 1980, 1981, 1982 and 1984, and won the North I Group II title in 1999.

=== Volleyball ===
The girls' volleyball team won the Group II state championship in 1999 (defeating runner-up James Caldwell High School in the tournament final) and won the Group I title in 2009 (vs. Science Park High School).

In 1999, the Pascack Hills girls' volleyball team achieved their first state title, winning the Group II championship in three games (8–15, 15–12, 15–11) against a James Caldwell team that came unbeaten into the finals. In 2009, the PHHS volleyball team won the Group I state championship in two games (25–22, 25–20) against Science Park.

=== Basketball ===
In the 2001–02 season, the Pascack Hills boys' basketball team accumulated their highest win total in school history and posted a 33–5 record. Nolan Leonard became the fourth Hills player to surpass 1,500 career points in a second half comeback victory at home versus Westwood Regional High School. The Cowboys posted an undefeated home record and suffered three losses on neutral courts. The season climaxed with a Group II state sectional championship over a physically larger Manchester Regional High School squad at the Northern Highlands gym. The Cowboys' season ended with a 94–78 loss to Roselle Park High School in the opening round of the Group II state tournament.

On March 5, 2007, the boys' basketball team won the North I, Group II state championship, edging Westwood Regional High School by 66–65 in overtime, in a game played at River Dell High School. Senior forward Evan Lampert was voted First Team All-County and finished his career with 1,000 points, the 1,000th point was scored in the Group II state championship.

=== Tennis ===
The boys' tennis team won the Group II state championship in 1986 (defeating Moorestown High School in the tournament final) and 2009 (vs. Chatham High School), and won the Group I title in 2005 (vs. Florence Township Memorial High School) and 2006 (vs. Pennsville Memorial High School).

The boys team won the 2006 Group I state championship, defeating Florence Township Memorial High School 3–2 in the semifinals and Pennsville Memorial High School 4–1 in the finals.

The boys team won the North I, Group II state sectional championship with a 4–1 win in the tournament final over Dwight Morrow High School.

The 2011 boys team won the North I, Group II state sectional championship 3–2 with a win vs. Mountain Lakes High School.

The girls tennis team won the Group I state championship in 2004, defeating Bernards High School in the final match of the tournament.

Both teams are coached by Eric Ganz, who is also the voice of Pascack Hills football.

=== Baseball ===
The baseball team won back-to-back Group III state championships in 1987 and 1988, defeating Cherry Hill High School West in the finals of the tournament in both years, and won the Group II titles in 2018 (vs. Raritan High School), 2019 (vs. Madison High School) and 2023 (vs.Rumson-Fair Haven Regional High School). The program's five state titles are tied for tenth in the state.

The 1987 team was the first to secure titles as NBIL league champions and Bergen County champions defeating Park Ridge High School 15–1, as part of a 28–5 season in which they captured the North I, Group III sectional title and won the Group III state championship over Cherry Hill High School West by a score of 6–4. The Cowboys won their league title three straight years, in 1987, 1988 and 1989.

In 1990, Pascack Hills won the North I Group III state sectional title. They lost to Toms River High School South in the Group III state championship game. In 1994 and 1995, the Cowboys would win back-to-back North I Group III state sectional titles. Both years they would fall in the Group III state semifinals.

In 2006, Hills won the North I, Group I state sectional title, defeating Emerson High School 3–2 in the tournament final. They would reach the Group I state final, their first since 1990, but lose to Pennsville Memorial High School.

In 2017, Pascack Hills won the North I, Group II state sectional title, defeating High Point Regional High School by a score of 4–2. They finished the season 21–9, losing in the Group II state semifinals. Also, they finished in second place in their league after going 0–8 in league play in 2016, their best finish since winning it in 2007. This was No. 4 seeded Hills' second straight sectional final appearance after falling to Jefferson in 2016 as the No. 12 seed. It was also their third sectional final appearance in five years, losing in 2016 to Jefferson and 2013 to Mahwah; their first sectional title since 2006, and the program's first Group II Sectional title. They were named BCCA Small School Baseball Team of the Year, Small School Team of the Year and North I Group II Team of the Year. They ended the year ranked No. 53 in New Jersey by MaxPreps. They began the season on an 8 game-win streak and were ranked as high as No. 9 in North Jersey, their first time making NJ.com's Top 25. It was their first 20-win season in a decade and the first for Coach Kevin Kirkby. This team helped start the return of PHHS baseball.

In 2018, Hills had their best season in school history, ending the season ranked 33rd in the nation by Baseball America. The team finished the season with a 30–2 record, en route to the Group II state championship. They completed the triple crown, winning the league, county, and state titles, marking the second time where a public school completed a triple Crown, the other was Pascack Hills back in 1987. Hills would finish the season ranked No. 1 in the state by NJ.com and No. 3 in the state by MaxPreps. They were also named Team and Baseball Team of the Year by NJ.com. They won their first league title since 2007. They were the No. 2 seed in the county tournament, they defeated third-seeded St. Joseph Regional High School in the semifinals and top-seeded Don Bosco Preparatory High School by a score of 3–1 in the finals, winning the program's first county title since 1987 and defeating in two games two schools that had won the county title in 14 of the previous 17 years. Hills’ Junior Villanova commit, Brandon Siegenthaler was named the tournament MVP, just like his Coach Kevin Kirkby was back in 1996. Hills’ Junior Maryland commit Ryan Ramsey won Pitcher of the Tournament. Hills defeated Raritan High School, 3–2 in the Group II State Championship, for their first State Championship in 31 years and ended the season on an 18-game win streak. The team was named Spring Male Team of the Year by NorthJerseySports.com.

In 2019, Hills went 29–3, winning a second straight Group II state championship, third straight North I Group II sectional title, and second straight league title. They were seeded No. 1 and defeated Ramsey High School by a 1–0 score in the North I, Group II sectional final on an extra-innings bases-loaded walk-off single, marking the first time that the program has won back-to-back-to-back Sectional titles. It was also their 4th straight finals appearance and fifth in seven years. They would go on and beat Point Pleasant Borough High School by a score of 2–0 in the Group II state championship game. Pascack Hills would finish ranked No. 3 in the state by NJ.com and No. 3 by MaxPreps. Senior pitcher Ryan Ramsey was named First Team All-State,

In the 2010s Hills went 150–88. In the decade they were: 2x Group II state champs, 3x North I Group II sectional champs, 2x Big North Patriot League champs, 1x Bergen County champs with 5 North I Group II sectional finals appearances as well as 3 Group II State Final Four appearances. Between 2016 and 2019, Pascack Hills went 96–26.

Head Coach Kevin Kirkby, who took over the program in 2013, got his 100th career coaching win in April 2019.

In 2023, under second-year Head Coach and Pascack Hills' alum Nick Evans, Pascack Hills won its third Group II state championship in six years by defeating Hanover Park High School, 4–1 in the semifinals and Rumson-Fair Haven Regional High School, 1–0 in the final game, finishing the season with a 22–7 record. The Broncos were the 3rd seed in the North I Group II state tournament and defeated defending Group II state champion Ramsey High School by a score of 3–1 in the finals, for their fourth North I Group II sectional title since 2017.

=== Track ===
The girls' track team won the winter track Group I state title in 2006.

=== Softball ===
The softball team won the 2007 North I, Group II state sectional championship with a shutout victory over Pascack Valley High School (1–0) in the tournament final. In 1985 the softball team won the North I, Group III state sectional championship with a 3–2 victory over Ramsey High School in the tournament final.

In 2021, the newly named Broncos won the programs first League Title since 1975. They went 14–5 on the season, falling in the first round of the North 1 Group 2 Sectional Tournament to 12th seeded Jefferson. Sophomore Pitcher Alana Kimball won North Jersey's Female Athlete of the Week for her work in late April.

=== Dance ===
The Pascack Valley Regional Dance Team consists of girls from Pascack Hills and Pascack Valley. There is a JV and Varsity team. The Varsity team has won the NDA national championship in 2006, 2007, 2008, 2010, 2012 and 2013. The coaches are Dena Noon and Val DeSantis. The Dance team currently holds many regional, state, and national titles.

=== Soccer ===
In 2007, the girls' soccer team, seeded 11th, won the North I, Group II state sectional championship with a 2–1 overtime win (4–2 on penalty kicks) over top-seeded River Dell High School in the tournament final. The win was the team's first sectional title.

== Other extracurricular activities ==
Pascack Hills students can join the Pascack Valley Regional High School District robotics team, FIRST Robotics Competition team 1676. This team, commonly known as the "Pascack Pi-oneers," was founded in 2004. The team has won awards at many competitions, including the Newton/Hopper Division Engineering Inspiration Award at the FIRST World Championship in 2016 and World Champion at the FIRST St. Louis Championship in 2017. In 2015, the Pascack Pi-oneers were given Academic Varsity Status by the Pascack Valley Regional District Board of Education.

Among the other activities are an award-winning theater program, highlighting the acting, singing and dancing talents of the Pascack Hills Players. The troupe has performed Rent, Chicago, and Curtains among others. In 2021, Yemie Woo won the Paper Mill Playhouse Rising Star Award for Best Performance by an Actress for “Fabulous Baby” from Sister Act. In 2024–25, the Players combined with Pascack Valley's theater program due to renovations and resumed as a standalone in 2025–26 with a production of Radium Girls.

In addition, there is a student-run news organization, known as the Trailblazer, which reports on topical events worldwide, with a focus on local/state events.

== Administration ==
The school's principal is Christine Pollinger. His core administration team includes two assistant principals.

== Notable alumni ==
Notable alumni of Pascack Hills High School include:

- Dana Bash (born 1971), CNN White House correspondent
- Bruce Beresford-Redman (born 1971), creator of MTV's Pimp My Ride
- Geoffrey Cantor (born 1965), actor
- Bkorn (born 1991, class of 2009), record producer
- Christopher Catalfo (born 1959), former wrestler who competed in the 1984 Summer Olympics
- Tim Catalfo (born 1959), former amateur wrestling standout, professional wrestler and mixed martial artist
- Jon Doscher (born 1971, class of 1989), film producer, actor, director and writer
- Mary Dunleavy (born 1966), soprano at the Metropolitan Opera and San Francisco Opera
- The Front Bottoms members Brian Sella (lead vocalist, class of 2006) and Mathew Uychich (drums, class of 2008)
- Chris Gehringer (born 1962), mastering engineer at Sterling Sound
- Kerri Green (born 1967), from films such as The Goonies and Lucas
- Jeff Hafley (born 1979), head coach of the Miami Dolphins
- Richard B. Handler (born 1961, class of 1979), businessman and CEO of Jefferies Group
- Rick Hurvitz, Executive Producer & Co-Creator, MTV's Pimp My Ride
- Bill Maher (born 1956, class of 1974), comedian and host of Real Time with Bill Maher
- Zac Moncrief (born 1971), animation director, formerly with Family Guy and Phineas and Ferb
- Matt Mulhern (born 1960), actor who appeared in the movie Biloxi Blues and the television series Major Dad
- Liliko Ogasawara (born 1972), former international competitor in judo who represented the United States in Judo at the 1996 Summer Olympics and was the first New Jersey girl to compete against boys in interscholastic wrestling
- Tom Papa (born 1967), comedian
- Kieran Scott (born 1974), author of the Privileged and Private series
- Jeffrey Vinokur (born 1990), science educator who combines hip-hop dance popping with live science demonstrations as "The Dancing Scientist"
- Shaun Weiss (born 1978), actor who played "Goldberg" in The Mighty Ducks film series
