= Mahwah Township Public Schools =

School district in Bergen County, New Jersey, US

- The logo of the Mahwah Township Public Schools, which depicts their "Thunderbird" mascot

Address
- 60 Ridge Road Mahwah, Bergen County, New Jersey, 07430; United States
- Coordinates: 41.090833°N 74.156904°W

District information
- Grades: PreK-12
- Superintendent: Michael DeTuro
- Business administrator: Kyle J. Bleeker
- Schools: 6

Students and staff
- Enrollment: 2,913 (as of 2019–20)
- Faculty: 262.6 FTEs
- Student–teacher ratio: 11.1:1

Other information
- District Factor Group: I
- Website: www.mahwah.k12.nj.us
Ind.	Per pupil	District spending	Rank (*)	K-12 average	%± vs. average
1A	Total Spending	$19,734	55	$18,891	4.5%
1	Budgetary Cost	16,249	59	14,783	9.9%
2	Classroom Instruction	9,252	60	8,763	5.6%
6	Support Services	2,604	57	2,392	8.9%
8	Administrative Cost	1,975	67	1,485	33.0%
10	Operations & Maintenance	1,930	57	1,783	8.2%
13	Extracurricular Activities	450	50	268	67.9%
16	Median Teacher Salary	71,250	62	64,043
Data from NJDoE 2014 Taxpayers' Guide to Education Spending. *Of K-12 districts with 1,800-3,500 students. Lowest spending=1; Highest=68

The Mahwah Township Public Schools is a comprehensive community public school district that serves students in pre-kindergarten through twelfth grade from Mahwah, in Bergen County, in the U.S. state of New Jersey.

As of the 2019–20 school year, the district, comprised of six schools, had an enrollment of 2,913 students and 262.6 classroom teachers (on an FTE basis), for a student–teacher ratio of 11.1:1.

The district is classified by the New Jersey Department of Education as being in District Factor Group "I", the second-highest of eight groupings. District Factor Groups organize districts statewide to allow comparison by common socioeconomic characteristics of the local districts. From the lowest socioeconomic status to highest, the categories are A, B, CD, DE, FG, GH, I and J.

== Awards, recognition and rankings ==
In 2012, Betsy Ross School was recognized by the Blue Ribbon Schools Program, one of 15 schools in the state to receive the recognition from the United States Department of Education.

== Schools ==
Schools in the district, with 2019–20 enrollment data from the National Center for Education Statistics, are:

Elementary schools

- Lenape Meadows Elementary School with 328 students in grades PreK-3
  - Paul Wyka, principal
- Betsy Ross Elementary School with 241 students in grades K-3
  - Aixa Garcia, principal
- George Washington Elementary School with 189 students in grades K-3
  - Jennifer Glebocki, principal
- Joyce Kilmer Elementary School with 414 students in grades 4–5
  - Billy Bowie, principal

Middle school

- Ramapo Ridge Middle School with 685 students in grades 6-8
  - Brian P. Cory, principal

High school

- Mahwah High School with 900 students in grades 9-12
  - John P. Pascale, principal

== Administration ==
Core members of the district's administration are:

- Michael DeTuro, superintendent
- Kyle J. Bleeker, business administrator and board secretary

== Board of education ==
The district's board of education, comprised of nine members, sets policy and oversees the fiscal and educational operation of the district through its administration. As a Type II school district, the board's trustees are elected directly by voters to serve three-year terms of office on a staggered basis, with three seats up for election each year held (since 2012) as part of the November general election. The board appoints a superintendent to oversee the district's day-to-day operations and a business administrator to supervise the business functions of the district.
