= Reaching Everyone By Exposing Lies =

Reaching Everyone By Exposing Lies (REBEL) was an anti-tobacco program for teens in New Jersey. REBEL began back in 2000 at Kick Ash Weekend. It was originally funded under the Tobacco Master Settlement Agreement as well as with tobacco product taxes. There were three division of REBEL: REBEL2 for middle school students, REBEL for high school students, and REBEL U/ROCS for college students. REBEL's slogan was "My mind, my body, my choice."

In April 2007, New Jersey REBEL had chapters in all 21 counties and in 76 New Jersey high schools. Each county and school chapter had a Youth Coordinator (and school adviser in school groups) who helped in using resources to aid with the group's plans and events. At their meetings, they discussed ideas and made plans to help fight against Big Tobacco.

In 2011, REBEL's funding dried up and REBEL ceased to operate.

== Achievements ==
- Smoke-Free Air Act went into effect on April 15, 2006. This new law prohibited smoking in any indoor public place.
- Age of Sale Increase. On April 15, 2006, the Age of Sale for tobacco product was raised from 18 to 19.

== Events ==
Each REBEL county and school chapter was required to have at least 5 events.

=== Great American Smokeout ===
Each school chapter was required to do an event for the Great American Smokeout. Each year on the third Thursday in November, the American Cancer Society sponsors this event to encourage people to give up smoking. Each school chapter holds an event within their school to encourage the student and staff to give up smoking.

=== World No Tobacco Day ===
May 31 of every year is World No Tobacco Day, an event created by the World Health Organization. This day encourages people to stop smoking for day, in hopes they will commit to quitting. Each school chapter was also required to hold an event for it.

=== Kick Butts Day ===
Kick Butts Day is an annual event that aims to educate teens about the dangers of tobacco. It was started by the Campaign For Tobacco-Free Kids. It is another day that each school chapter was required to hold an event for. The 2017 date was March 15.

=== RTLI ===
The RTLI (REBEL's Tobacco Learning Institute) was an event held once a year. Its goal was to educate select REBEL members. Each county sent a few of their members up to a three-day overnight retreat. They attended classes to learn skills in educating others about the harms of tobacco. Some of the classes included informative classes like Tobacco 101, Tobacco 202, and Tobacco Control Across the Borders. They also had skills classes such as Communication Boot Camp, Lead with Power, and Group Facilitation. Each county also chose an initiative. Each county must have had five county events relating to their initiative, and each school chapter was required to have at least one event relating to the county's initiative. The four initiatives a county could choose from were:

- Recruitment, which aims to teach techniques to recruit new members.
- Advocacy, which teaches the members to voice their opinions.
- Reading and Mentoring, which teaches the county members skills to help with the groups mentoring program.
- Youth Empowerment, which provides members with skills to work without an adult doing everything for them.

=== State summit ===
A state summit was held once every year for all members from all across the state. This event was to help keep members across the state united. During the morning the member got together and shared ideas as well as made new friends. During the afternoon, the member had a fun activity. Many of the events had been held at Six Flags, with the members being together during the morning and then being allowed to roam the park for the rest of the day.

== Mentoring program ==
The group had two books made by Scholastic: The Uninvited Guest, which is geared toward 2nd and 3rd graders, and Get Rid of That Smoke! which is geared toward kindergarten and 1st graders. Schools chapters could have held trainings to train their members to read to younger kids. Before a school could have been able to take their members to read to younger kids, all participating members must have been trained in mentoring. The mentoring program was also a county initiative.

== Lack of funding ==
As of June 10, 2010, New Jersey was 50th of all 50 states in terms of anti-tobacco funding. In 2011, Governor Christie eliminated funding for all state sponsored anti-tobacco programs by means of line item veto. The lack of government funding forced REBEL to cease operations.
