= Ramsey Public School District =

School district in Bergen County, New Jersey, US

Address
- 25 North Franklin Turnpike Ramsey, Bergen County, New Jersey, 07446; United States
- Coordinates: 41.057717°N 74.135174°W

District information
- Grades: PreK-12
- Superintendent: Andrew C. Matteo
- Business administrator: Thomas W. O'Hern
- Schools: 5

Students and staff
- Enrollment: 2,418 (as of 2023–24)
- Faculty: 249.3 FTEs
- Student–teacher ratio: 9.7:1

Other information
- District Factor Group: I
- Website: www.ramsey.k12.nj.us
Ind.	Per pupil	District spending	Rank (*)	K-12 average	%± vs. average
1A	Total Spending	$19,582	54	$18,891	3.7%
1	Budgetary Cost	15,997	58	14,783	8.2%
2	Classroom Instruction	9,686	62	8,763	10.5%
6	Support Services	2,675	59	2,392	11.8%
8	Administrative Cost	1,464	26	1,485	−1.4%
10	Operations & Maintenance	1,748	46	1,783	−2.0%
13	Extracurricular Activities	410	43	268	53.0%
16	Median Teacher Salary	72,255	63	64,043
Data from NJDoE 2014 Taxpayers' Guide to Education Spending. *Of K-12 districts with 1,800-3,500 students. Lowest spending=1; Highest=68

The Ramsey Public School District is a comprehensive community public school district that serves students in pre-kindergarten through twelfth grade from Ramsey in Bergen County, in the U.S. state of New Jersey.

As of the 2023–24 school year, the district, comprised of five schools, had an enrollment of 2,418 students and 249.3 classroom teachers (on an FTE basis), for a student–teacher ratio of 9.7:1.

The district had been classified by the New Jersey Department of Education as being in District Factor Group "I", the second-highest of eight groupings. District Factor Groups organize districts statewide to allow comparison by common socioeconomic characteristics of the local districts. From lowest socioeconomic status to highest, the categories are A, B, CD, DE, FG, GH, I and J.

Students from Saddle River's Wandell School attend the district's middle school and then have the option of attending either Ramsey High School or Northern Highlands Regional High School as part of sending/receiving relationships with the Saddle River School District and each of the respective districts.

The Ramsey Public School District follows a district-wide ban on phones. No phones are allowed to be used during school hours, and at Ramsey High School the phones are locked in Yondr pouches. This policy was implemented as part of a bill signed into law by Governor Phil Murphy in January 2026 at Ramsey High School.

== Awards and recognition ==
For the 1995–96 school year, Eric S. Smith Middle School was named a "Star School" by the New Jersey Department of Education, the highest honor that a New Jersey school can achieve.

== Construction and district reconfiguration ==
On September 30, 2003, residents of Ramsey passed a referendum providing $23.4 million for the construction of a new Dater School, the construction of a new, six-lane track at the High School, and the renovation of the High School, Smith School and Hubbard School.

- Ramsey High School's Track is now a six-lane, all-weather track and was completed in Fall/Winter 2004.
- Ramsey High School was renovated with added classrooms.
- Eric S. Smith Middle School was reconfigured with an expanded media center, cafeteria and gymnasium, as well as creating new classrooms.
- Mary A. Hubbard School was converted into a building suitable for grades K–3, with new rooms added and others renovated.

== Schools ==
Schools in the district (with 2023–24 enrollment data from the National Center for Education Statistics) are:

Elementary schools

- Mary A. Hubbard Elementary School with 345 students in grades PreK–3
  - Stacey Linzenbold, principal
- Wesley D. Tisdale Elementary School with 320 students in grades PreK–3
  - Gina Aliano, principal
- John Y. Dater Elementary School with 322 students in grades 4–5
  - Jennifer Glebocki, principal

Middle school

- Eric S. Smith Middle School with 628 students in grades 6–8
  - Ryan Esdale, principal

High school

- Ramsey High School with 773 students in grades 9–12
  - Michael J. Thumm, principal

== Administration ==
Core members of the district's administration are:

- Andrew C. Matteo, superintendent
- Thomas W. O'Hern, business administrator and board secretary

== Board of education ==
The district's board of education is comprised of nine members who set policy and oversee the fiscal and educational operation of the district through its administration. As a Type II school district, the board's trustees are elected directly by voters to serve three-year terms of office on a staggered basis, with three seats up for election each year held (since 2015) as part of the November general election. The board appoints a superintendent to oversee the district's day-to-day operations and a business administrator to supervise the business functions of the district.

== Gallery ==
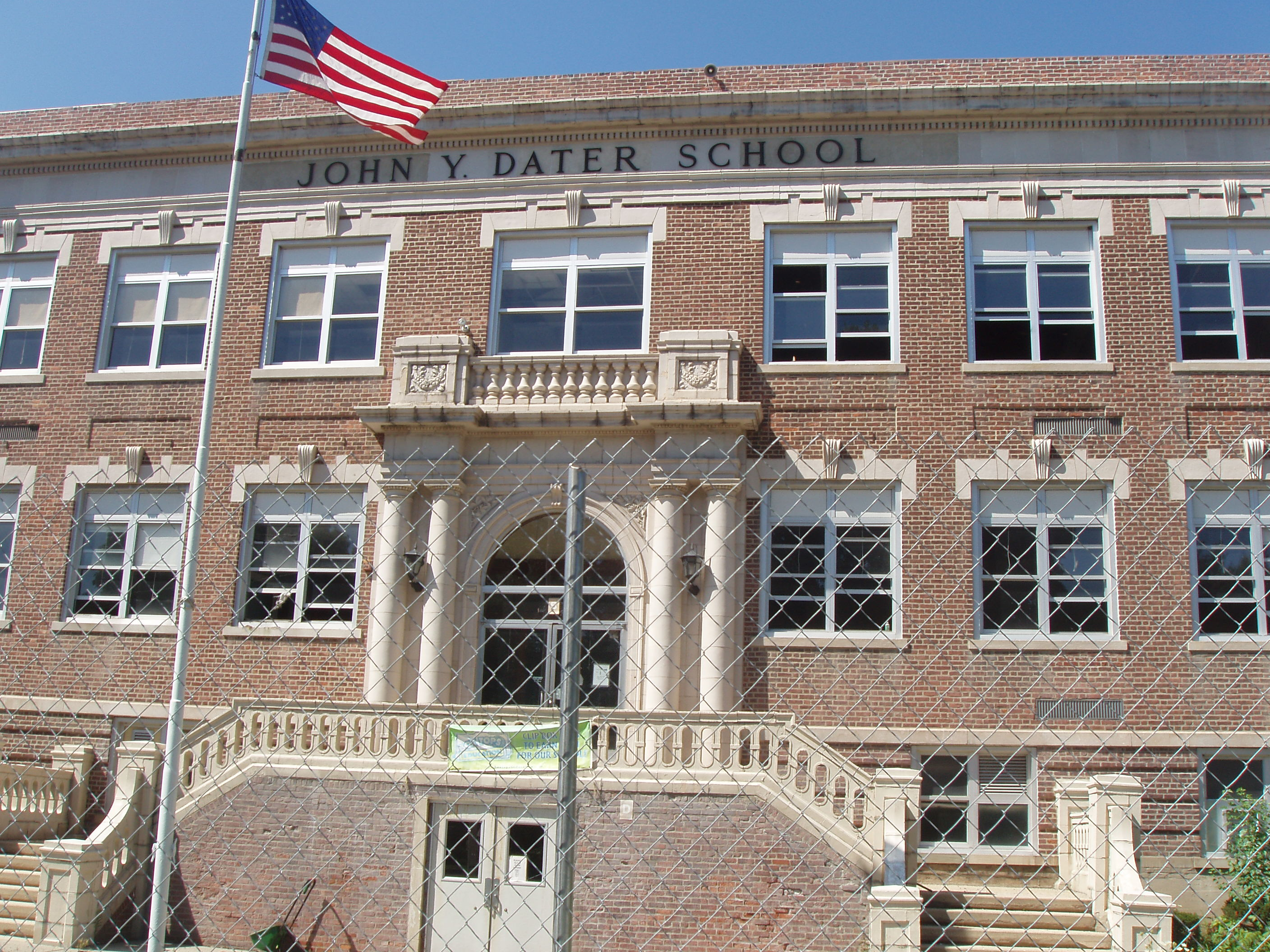
The original John Y. Dater Elementary School

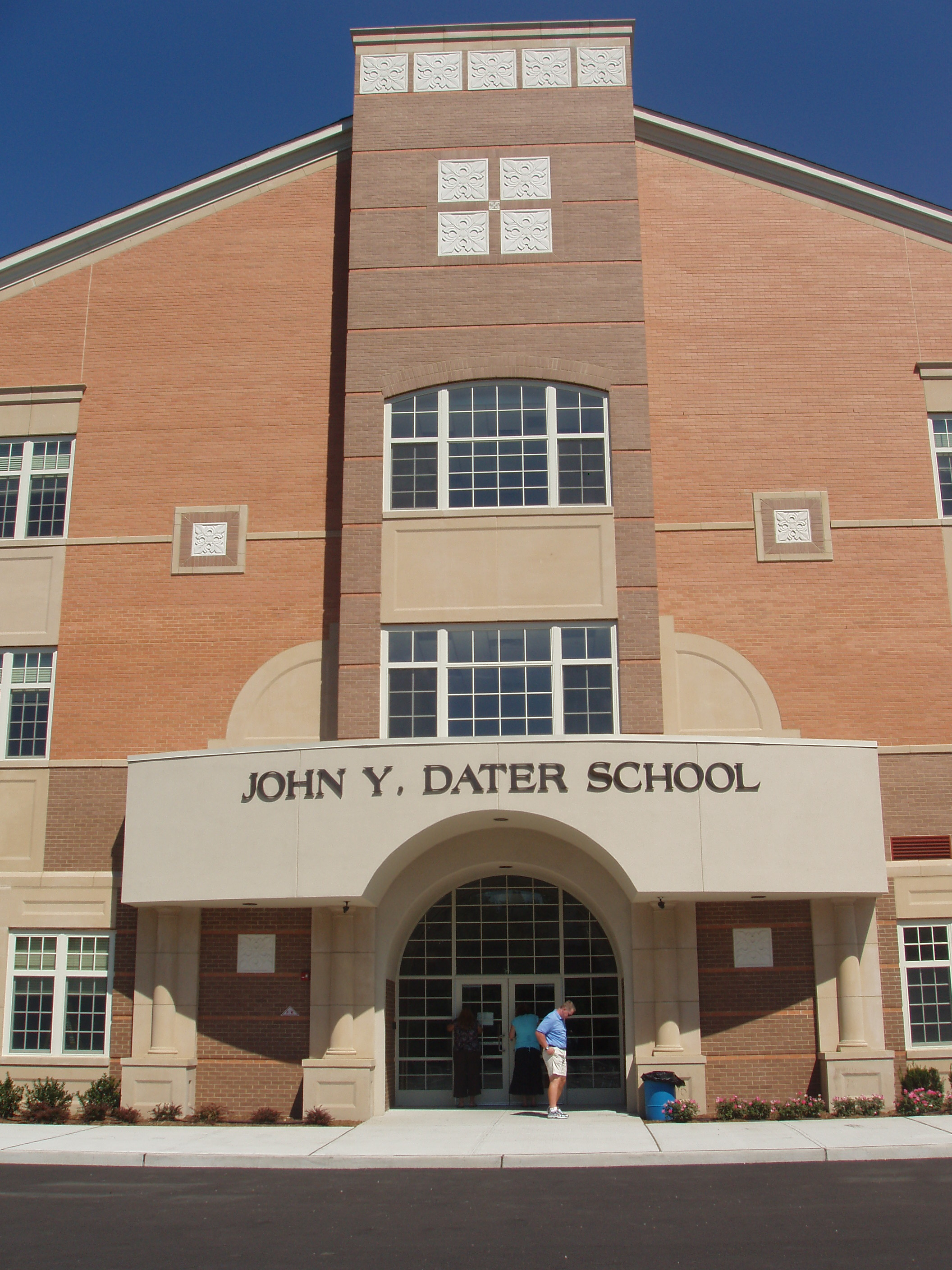
The John Y. Dater Elementary School built in 2006
