= Pascack Valley Regional High School District =

School district in Bergen County, New Jersey, US

Address
- 28 West Grand Avenue Montvale, Bergen County, New Jersey, 07645; United States
- Coordinates: 41.050°N 74.045°W

District information
- Grades: 9-12
- Superintendent: Sarah Bilotti
- Business administrator: Yas Usami
- Schools: 2

Students and staff
- Enrollment: 1,867 (as of 2021–22)
- Faculty: 172.6 FTEs
- Student–teacher ratio: 10.8:1

Other information
- District Factor Group: I
- Website: www.pascack.org
Ind.	Per pupil	District spending	Rank (*)	9-12 average	%± vs. average
1A	Total Spending	$23,472	39	$18,891	24.2%
1	Budgetary Cost	19,277	43	15,592	23.6%
2	Classroom Instruction	10,390	43	8,807	18.0%
6	Support Services	3,437	45	2,294	49.8%
8	Administrative Cost	1,976	46	1,592	24.1%
10	Operations & Maintenance	2,333	41	1,954	19.4%
13	Extracurricular Activities	1,135	40	873	30.0%
16	Median Teacher Salary	85,146	44	71,726
Data from NJDoE 2014 Taxpayers' Guide to Education Spending. *Of 9-12 districts with any number of students. Lowest spending=1; Highest=47

The Pascack Valley Regional High School District is a regional public high school district encompassing students from four communities in the Pascack Valley region of Bergen County, in the U.S. state of New Jersey, serving students in ninth through twelfth grades from Hillsdale, Montvale, River Vale and Woodcliff Lake.

As of the 2021–22 school year, the district, comprising two schools, had an enrollment of 1,867 students and 172.6 classroom teachers (on an FTE basis), for a student–teacher ratio of 10.8:1.

The district is classified by the New Jersey Department of Education as being in District Factor Group "I", the second-highest of eight groupings. District Factor Groups organize districts statewide to allow comparison by common socioeconomic characteristics of the local districts. From lowest socioeconomic status to highest, the categories are A, B, CD, DE, FG, GH, I and J.

== History ==
In 1955, Pascack Valley Regional High School District opened Pascack Valley High School with an enrollment of 650 students from the boroughs of Hillsdale, Montvale, River Vale, and Woodcliff Lake, having bonded $1,250,000 towards the costs of construction. Previously, students from those municipalities attended other local high schools, including Westwood High School. Students from Hillsdale, Montvale and Woodcliff Lake had attended Park Ridge High School. With increasing enrollment as the suburbs boomed, the towns, with state approval, formed a regional high school district.

During the next several years enrollment increased and so did the faculty and building capacity. Additional classrooms were added and the program of studies was expanded. Increased enrollment in 1963 resulted in double sessions. In September 1964, Pascack Hills High School opened up to students living in Montvale, Woodcliff Lake and a portion of Hillsdale, with a flexible scheduling program that allowed students to select courses using a system run by an analyst from International Telephone and Telegraph using a mainframe computer system. Pascack Valley High School had the balance of Hillsdale students and all of River Vale students. In the early 1990s, western portions of Hillsdale (west of Pascack Road) transitioned from sending to Pascack Hills to Pascack Valley.

By 1970, the enrollment was again up to capacity and building construction was necessary to house 1,800 students. This expansion of Pascack Valley High School provided additional classrooms, expanded department areas, and other facilities such as gymnasium, a new cafeteria and library.

In March 2008, the district announced plans to offer online courses, beginning in the 2008–09 school year, with that school year's seniors being given priority.

In July 2020 the district board of education voted to eliminate both the PVHS "Indians" and the "Cowboys" at Pascack Hills High School. In March 2021, the board of education ratified new team names that had been selected by a vote of students and staff at each school, with Pascack Hills being renamed the Broncos and Pascack Valley adopting the Panthers as its new team name.

== Awards and recognition ==
- In the 2000–01 school year, Pascack Valley Regional High School was recognized with the Best Practices Award by the New Jersey Department of Education for its "Senior Projects/Senior Alternate Assessment Program".
- Pascack Hills High School was the 7th-ranked public high school in New Jersey out of 339 schools statewide in New Jersey Monthly magazine's September 2014 cover story on the state's "Top Public High Schools", using a new ranking methodology, after having been ranked 18th in the state out of 328 schools in 2012; Pascack Valley High School was ranked 39th in 2014 and 73rd in 2012.
- The Pascack Pi-oneers, a district-wide high school robotics team, has won several regional awards.

== Schools ==
Schools in the district (with 2021–22 enrollment data from the National Center for Education Statistics) are:

- Pascack Hills High School opened in Montvale in 1964 and served 999 students in grades 9-12 from Montvale and Woodcliff Lake.
  - Timothy Wieland, principal
- Pascack Valley High School in Hillsdale opened in 1955 and served 999 students in grades 9-12 from Hillsdale and River Vale.
  - John Puccio Jr., principal
- Park Academy is a therapeutic middle school program operated as part of the Region II / Pascack Valley Council for Special Education that is focused on preparing students for mainstream education in their home district.

== Administration ==
Core members of the district's administration are:

- Sarah Bilotti, superintendent She assumed the position as superintendent in July 2022, after seven years heading the North Warren Regional School District.
- Yas Usami, business administrator and board secretary

== Board of education ==
The district's board of education, comprised of nine members, sets policy and oversees the fiscal and educational operation of the district through its administration. As a Type II school district, the board's trustees are elected directly by voters to serve three-year terms of office on a staggered basis, with three seats up for election each year held (since 2012) as part of the November general election. The board appoints a superintendent to oversee the district's day-to-day operations and a business administrator to supervise the business functions of the district. Seats on the board of education are allocated based on the population of the constituent districts, with three assigned to Hillsdale and two each assigned to Montvale, River Vale and Woodcliff Lake.
