= Northern Highlands Regional High School =

High school in Bergen County, New Jersey, US

Address
- 298 Hillside Avenue Allendale, Bergen County, New Jersey, 07401; United States
- Coordinates: 41.034822°N 74.145511°W

District information
- Grades: 9–12
- Superintendent: Scot Beckerman
- Business administrator: Sue Anne Mather
- Schools: 1

Students and staff
- Enrollment: 1,257 (as of 2024–25)
- Faculty: 109.7 FTEs
- Student–teacher ratio: 11.5:1

Other information
- District Factor Group: J
- Website: northernhighlands.org
Ind.	Per pupil	District spending	Rank (*)	9-12 average	%± vs. average
1A	Total Spending	$21,018	28	$18,891	11.3%
1	Budgetary Cost	16,570	29	15,592	6.3%
2	Classroom Instruction	9,503	30	8,807	7.9%
6	Support Services	2,456	28	2,294	7.1%
8	Administrative Cost	1,462	13	1,592	−8.2%
10	Operations & Maintenance	2,087	28	1,954	6.8%
13	Extracurricular Activities	1,036	34	873	18.7%
16	Median Teacher Salary	73,835	34	71,726
Data from NJDoE 2014 Taxpayers' Guide to Education Spending. *Of 9-12 districts with any number of students. Lowest spending=1; Highest=47

Northern Highlands Regional High School

Information
- Type: Public high school
- Established: 1965
- School district: Northern Highlands Regional School District
- NCES School ID: 341173000646
- Principal: Joseph J. Occhino
- Faculty: 109.7 FTEs
- Grades: 9–12
- Enrollment: 1,257 (as of 2024–25)
- Student to teacher ratio: 11.5:1
- Colors: Red black and white
- Athletics conference: Big North Conference (general); North Jersey Super Football Conference (football)
- Team name: Highlanders
- Publication: Loch and Quay (literary magazine)
- Newspaper: The Highland Fling
- Yearbook: Thistle

Northern Highlands Regional High School (NHRHS) is a regional public high school and school district in Allendale, in Bergen County, in the U.S. state of New Jersey. The school serves students in ninth through twelfth grades from Allendale, Ho-Ho-Kus, Saddle River, and Upper Saddle River. Students from Saddle River have the option of attending either Northern Highlands or Ramsey High School, as part of sending/receiving relationships with the two districts. The high school is the only facility of the Northern Highlands Regional High School District.

As of the 2024–25 school year, the school had an enrollment of 1,257 students and 109.7 classroom teachers (on an FTE basis), for a student–teacher ratio of 11.5:1. There were 12 students (1.0% of enrollment) eligible for free lunch and none eligible for reduced-cost lunch.

Northern Highlands Regional High School is accredited by the New Jersey Department of Education.

== History ==
Prior to the opening of the regional high school, students from Allendale had attended Mahwah High School, while those from Upper Saddle River had been sent to attend Ramsey High School. The districts reached agreement to an early end of the sending arrangement, with plans to have 230 students from Allendale and 260 from Upper Saddle River in the new regional facility.

In May 1963, voters in Allendale and Upper Saddle River approved a referendum to create Northern Highlands Regional High School, with the planned expenditure of $3.65 million (equivalent to $38.4 million in 2025) to build a facility on a 40-acre (16 ha) site, with the objective to complete the building in time to start classes in September 1965.

The building, completed at a cost of $4 million, was dedicated in February 1966 and was constructed to handle an expected enrollment of 1,300 students. The facilities included in the original structure included a planetarium and 750-seat auditorium / theater and an FM radio station.

Students from Ho-Ho-Kus started attending school in the mid-1990s after their school district cited the need for electives and class sizes that were lacking at Midland Park High School.

In 2012, school elections were shifted from April to the November general election as part of an effort to reduce the costs of a standalone April vote.

In 2016, the Northern Highlands district reached an agreement with the Ho-Ho-Kus School District to extend the send / receive agreement through 2026 under a fixed-price contract by which Ho-Ho-Kus would pay $3.6 million for the 2016–17 school year, escalating by 2% a year to $4.3 million in 2025–26, regardless of the number of students from the borough sent to the high school.

The district had been classified by the New Jersey Department of Education as being in District Factor Group "J", the highest of eight groupings. District Factor Groups organize districts statewide to allow comparison by common socioeconomic characteristics of the local districts. From lowest socioeconomic status to highest, the categories are A, B, CD, DE, FG, GH, I and J.

== Awards, recognition and rankings ==
In the 2025 Niche rankings that rank the best traditional public high schools in New Jersey, Northern Highlands Regional High School ranks as number 4 best public high school in New Jersey when excluding Magnet public schools and number 14 when taking in consideration New Jerseys public magnet schools.

During the 1986–87 school year, Northern Highlands Regional High School was awarded the Blue Ribbon School Award of Excellence by the United States Department of Education, the highest award an American school can receive.

In 2009, Maryann Woods-Murphy, a Northern Highlands Regional High School Spanish teacher, was named the New Jersey Teacher of the Year, the highest honor given to a teacher by the state.

The school was the 3rd-ranked public high school in New Jersey out of 339 schools statewide in New Jersey Monthly magazine's September 2014 cover story on the state's "Top Public High Schools", using a new ranking methodology. The school had been ranked 22nd in the state of 328 schools in 2012, after being ranked 6th in 2010 out of 322 schools listed. The magazine ranked the school 8th in 2008 out of 316 schools. The school was ranked 7th in the magazine's September 2006 issue, which included 316 schools across the state. Schooldigger.com ranked the school 43rd out of 381 public high schools statewide in its 2011 rankings (a decrease of 29 positions from the 2010 ranking) which were based on the combined percentage of students classified as proficient or above proficient on the mathematics (93.2%) and language arts literacy (97.7%) components of the High School Proficiency Assessment (HSPA).

In Newsweek's 2014 ranking of the country's top high schools, Northern Highlands Regional High School was listed in 59th place, the 9th-highest ranked school in New Jersey.

In the 2011 "Ranking America's High Schools" issue by The Washington Post, the school was ranked 35th in New Jersey and 1,171st nationwide. The school was ranked 1174th nationwide, the 39th-highest in New Jersey, in Newsweek magazine's 2010 rankings of America's Best High Schools. In Newsweek's May 22, 2007 issue, ranking the country's top high schools, Northern Highlands Regional High School was listed in 766th place, the 16th-highest ranked school in New Jersey.

Nationally, Northern Highlands Regional High School is ranked #575 and has a score of 96.8/100 according to U.S. News.

== Curriculum ==
Northern Highlands has a four-day rotating schedule; days are lettered with A through D. Students are scheduled for eight courses, six of which meet daily. This schedule provides longer segments of time (57-minute periods) to engage in higher-order thinking and performance-based learning. To receive a Northern Highlands Regional High School diploma, all students must pass the New Jersey High School Proficiency Assessment (HSPA), and earn a minimum of 125 credits including: four years of English and a Freshman Rhetoric course for one semester; one year of World History / Cultures; two years of United States History; three years of Mathematics; three years of Science; two years of World Languages; two years of Career Education & Consumer, Family, and Life Skills, one semester of which is Contemporary Business Technology, one semester of a Financial Literacy course; two years of Visual and Performing Arts; and a year of Physical Education and/or Health for each year a student is in attendance at Northern Highlands.

Elective offerings in Visual and Performing Arts include: all art and music classes, Acting I, Actors' Workshop, Creative Writing I and II, Journalism, TV Production I and II, and Film Studies. Semester courses include: Digital Multimedia and Web Page Design, as well as Mass Communications, Introduction to TV and Film, and Public Speaking. Elective offerings in Family and Life Skills include: Business, Computer classes, Industrial Technology, Family and Consumer Sciences, Music and Fine Arts. Semester courses include Digital Multimedia and Web Page Design which may apply either to Visual and Performing Arts requirements OR Family and Life Skills, and Personal Finance and Investment, Entrepreneurship, Financial Management and Accounting, and Sports and Entertainment Marketing. Engineering courses are offered and rapidly growing in popularity. Those students who take two lab sciences must have a study.

There are 37 Honors courses – two of which are Syracuse University Honors Project Advance classes in Forensic Science and Writing Studio I/ Reading Interpretation – and 19 Advanced Placement courses, in AP English Language and Composition, AP English Literature and Composition, AP United States History, AP European History, AP Calculus AB, AP Calculus BC, AP Statistics, AP Biology, AP Chemistry, AP Physics 1, AP Physics C, AP French Language, AP Spanish Language, AP Precalculus, AP Macroeconomics, AP Art History, AP Studio Art, AP United States Government and Politics, AP Computer Science and AP Music Theory. AP courses are available to juniors and seniors and sophomores, although sophomores are only allowed one.

== Extracurricular activities ==
The school newspaper is called The Highland Fling.

The Northern Highlands Regiment, the high school marching band under the direction of Taylor Rehe, is a top program in the region, having won the USSBA New Jersey Division 4A state championship in 2004 and 2010 as well as the Group 3A State and National Championships in 2012. They also won the Group 4A National Championship in 2013 and 2014.

== Athletics ==
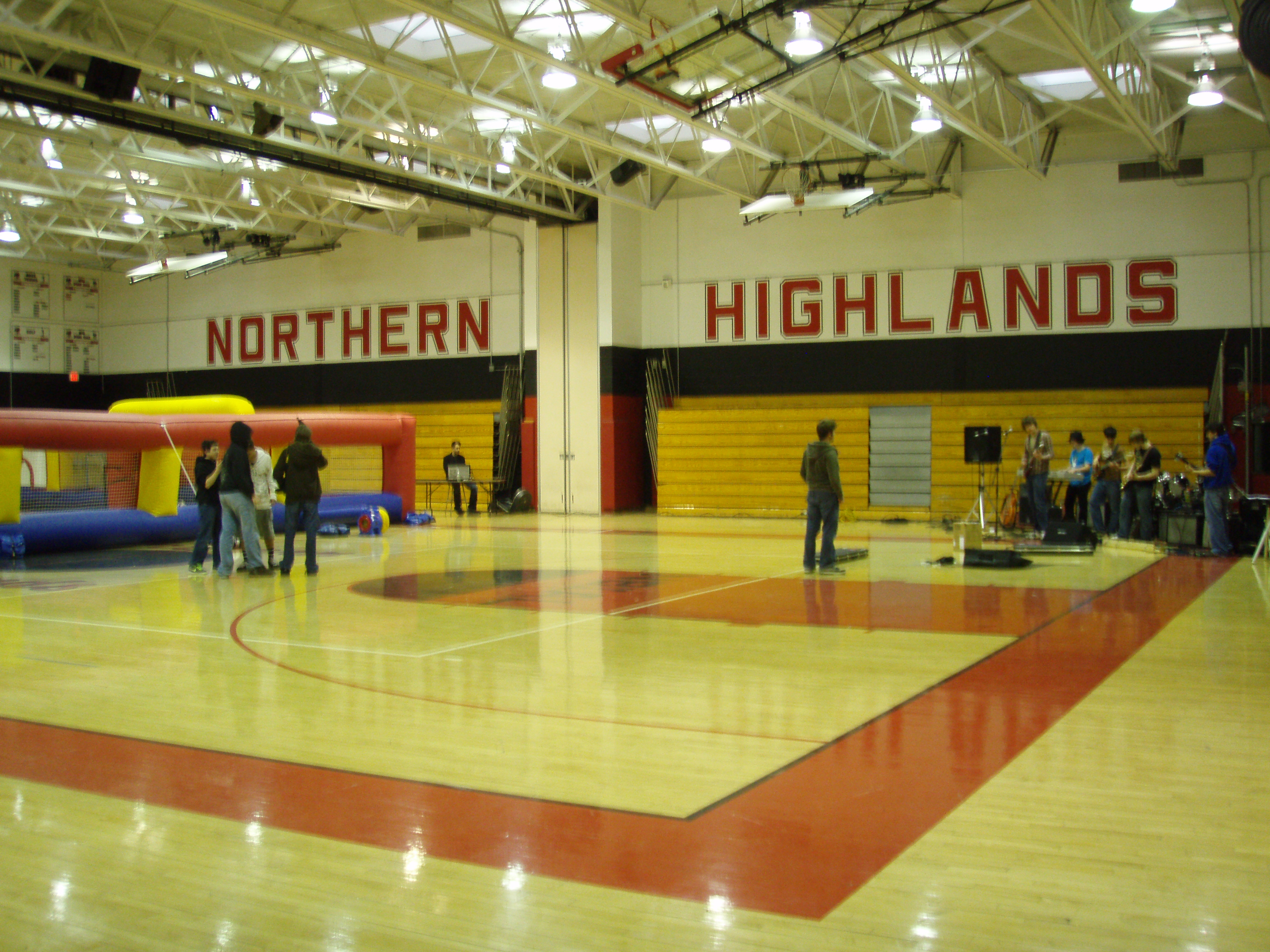
Corcoran Gymnasium at Northern Highlands during the Palooza

The Northern Highlands Regional High School Highlanders compete in the Big North Conference, which is comprised of public and private high schools in Bergen and Passaic counties, and was established following a reorganization of sports leagues in Northern New Jersey by the New Jersey State Interscholastic Athletic Association (NJSIAA). Before the 2010 realignment, the school had previously competed in the North Bergen Interscholastic Athletic League, which had included schools in Bergen and Passaic counties. With 1,021 students in grades 10–12, the school was classified by the NJSIAA for the 2019–20 school year as Group III for most athletic competition purposes, which included schools with an enrollment of 761 to 1,058 students in that grade range. The football team competes in the Freedom Red division of the North Jersey Super Football Conference, which includes 112 schools competing in 20 divisions, making it the nation's biggest football-only high school sports league. The school was classified by the NJSIAA as Group IV North for football for 2024–2026, which included schools with 893 to 1,315 students.

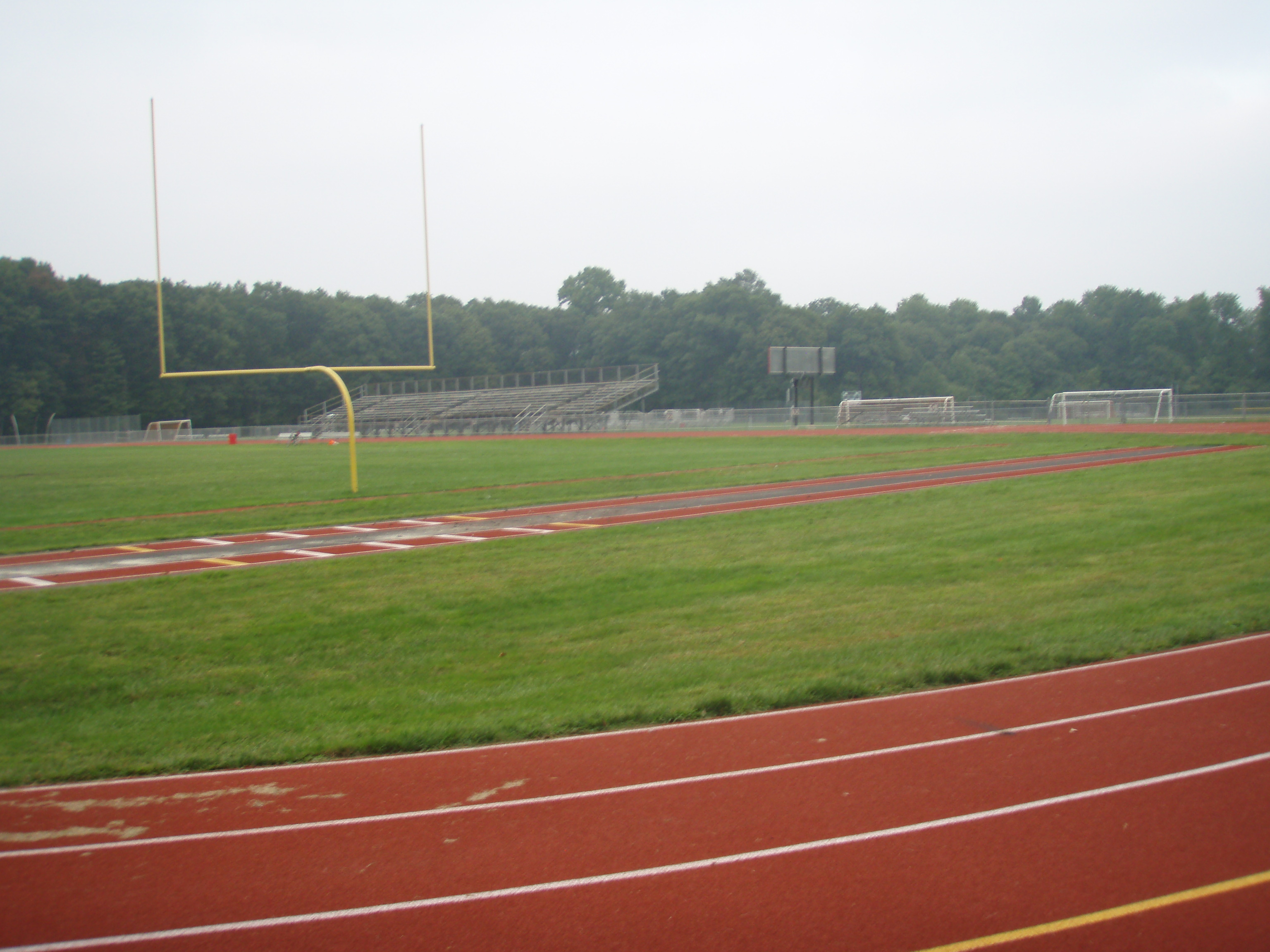
A track and football field at the stadium at Northern Highlands Regional High School

The football team won the NJSIAA North I Group III state sectional championship in 1978 and the North I Group IV title in 2019. Starting in 1965, Fred Conrad became the Northern Highlands Head football coach. After eight years, Conrad led Highlands to its first state final match. The Scotty Dogs ended up with Highlands' first playoff championship win in 1978, with a 6–0 win against Pascack Hills High School in the North I Group III championship game. Five years later, Conrad brought the Scotty Dogs to their second state championship. Three years later, the Scotty Dogs would face Indian Hills High School in the state, losing by a missed field goal. In 2019, the team beat Woodbridge High School by a score of 27–7 in the tournament finals to win the North I Group IV state sectional title, the program's second in 41 years.

The field hockey team won the North I Group III state sectional championship in 1986, 1987, 1989–1991, 1993, 2013 and 2014; the team won the Group III state championship in 1986, defeating Central Regional High School in the tournament final. The team won the 2008 Bergen County Championship, its first since 2002. They were named by The Record as Team of the Year and were ranked #3 in the state. In 2010, the Northern Highlands Field Hockey team has become the second field hockey team in school history to win three consecutive Bergen County Championships, defeating Northern Valley Regional High School at Demarest by a score of 1–0 in 2008, and defeating Ramsey High School by 2–0 in 2009 and 3–2 in 2010. Northern Highlands had also won three consecutive titles from 1998 to 2000.

The girls' cross country team won the Group III state championship in 1991 and the Group II title in 1993.

The boys' track and field program were the league champions from 2002 to 2006. The men's track team won the League, County and Sectional championships in 2006.

The ice hockey team won the Public B state championship in 2018. The team won the NBIL regular season title and the inaugural NBIL Cup in 2007. The team won the Public B title in 2018 with a 1–0 win against Randolph High School.

The boys' lacrosse team won the Group III state championship in 2018 with a 10–6 win against runner-up Moorestown High School in the tournament final.

The girls' tennis team won the Group III state championship in 2019, defeating Red Bank Regional High School in the final match of the tournament. The 2001 girls team won the NJSIAA North I, Group III sectional championship, defeating Ramapo High School, 3–2 in the tournament final. The boys' tennis team duplicated the feat that same year, also defeating Ramapo High School by the same three matches to two score in the final. The 2003 girls' tennis team won the North I, Group III sectional championship, defeating Ramapo High School, 3–2 in the tournament final. The 2004 and 2005 teams, repeated the result, winning 4–1 over Ramapo both years.

The girls' basketball team won the 2005 North I, Group III sectional championship, defeating West Morris Central High School 35–27 in the final game.

The girls' soccer team won the Group III state title in 1991 as co-champion with Ewing High School, was co-champion in 1992 with Hillsborough High School, was co-champion in 2009 with Hopewell Valley Central High School, won in both 2011 and 2012 vs. Moorestown High School, in 2013 vs. Toms River High School South, 2014 vs. Colts Neck High School and 2018 vs. Moorestown; the program's nine group championships are the fifth-most of any school in the state. The 1991 team finished the season with a 20–1–4 record after winning its share of the Group III state championship after a 1–1 tie against Ewing in the tournament final. The team won the 2003 North I Group III sectional championship over Northern Valley Regional High School at Old Tappan by a 2–1 score. During the 2009 season, the girls' soccer team played against Hopewell Valley Central High School in the state finals in The College of New Jersey. The game ended with a tie of 0–0 and it was the first time Northern Highlands girls' varsity soccer team has ever won a co-championship since 1992. During the 2011 season, the varsity girls' soccer team again made it to the state finals on November 19, 2011. Highlands won championship against Moorestown High School at 2–0. The team ended the season with a perfect score of 24–0–0 and with a national ranking of 4th among high school girls' soccer teams.

The boys' tennis team won the 2008 North I, Group III state sectional championship with a 4–1 win in the tournament final over Fair Lawn High School. The 2014 boys' tennis team won the North I, Group III state sectional championship with a 3–2 win in the tournament final over Northern Valley Regional High School Demarest. The 2017 boys' tennis team won the North I, Group III state section championship with a 3–2 win in the tournament final over Wayne Hills High School.

The 2008 girls' volleyball team won its first state championship by defeating West Morris Central High School 17–25, 25–22, 25–19, the school's first state championship victory since 1993.

The girls' fencing team won the overall state team championship in 2010, 2011 and 2013, was sabre team winner in 2005–2007 and 2011, was the foil team winner in 2010, 2011, 2013, 2019 and 2020, and was épée team winner in 2013. The program's three state titles are ranked fourth in the state, while the nine squad titles are ranked second statewide. The team won state sectionals in 2008–09, becoming the number one fencing team in Bergen County. Then, they went on to the state championships where they were defeated 17–10 by Governor Livingston High School for first in the state. However, in the 2009–10 season the girls' team made it back to the state tournament against Governor Livingston where they won.

The boys' wrestling team won the North I Group III state sectional championship in 2013.

The girls' bowling team won the 2014 North I Group III sectional title.

The 2016 baseball team won the NJSIAA North I Group III sectional championship, defeating Ramapo High School, 6–4 in the sectional final. Two games later the men's baseball team won their first outright NJSIAA Group III state championship in school history, defeating Ocean City High School, 7–2 in the tournament final. The team ended with a 23–10 record, finishing ranked 2nd in Bergen County and 7th in the State and were named by The Record as Team of the Year for the 2016 season.

The boys' bowling team won the 2017 North I Group IV Sectional title.

== School publications ==
The official student newspaper of Northern Highlands Regional High School is called The Highland Fling. The title refers to a traditional Scottish dance.

This 20-page paper is published eight times during the school year. Students do all of the work: planning the issues, writing articles, selling advertisements and assisting with the actual printing of the paper. The editors consider any interested students in grades 9–12 who wish to write or take photos for the paper. Students wishing to join the editorial staff first gain experience as contributing staff members and, in the spring, submit an application and writing sample. Outgoing editors select the new editorial staff from among the applicants.

The school's publications have won acclaim and numerous awards from the Garden State Scholastic Press Association, the Columbia Scholastic Press Association and the National Scholastic Press Association (co-sponsored by the American Society of Newspaper Editors), among others. The school's literary magazine, Loch and Quay, was recognized in both 1992 and 1994 by the Columbia Scholastic Press Association as a Silver Crown Magazine.

== Clubs and activities ==
Northern Highlands has over 50 clubs that meet during and after school. They include: Animal Conservation, Art Club, Chemistry Club, Chess Club, Debate Club, DECA, Emergency Service, Engineering Club, Engineering Club, Environmental Awareness, Fed Challenge, Fishing Club, French Club, Freshman Literary Magazine, Gender Sexuality Awareness, Dumbledore's Army, Highlands Cares, Highlands Heros, Rotary Club, Italian Club, Leos CLub, Literary Magazine, Highlands Regiment, Mock Trial, Model Congress, Model UN, Highlands Voices, Highlands Belles, Highlands Harmonics, Guitar Club, The Highlands Fling, NH Theater Company, Quiz Bowl, Science League, Spanish Club, Stock Market Club, Students Against Destructive Decisions, Yearbook Club, and Yoga Club.

== Administration ==
Core members of the district / school administration are:

District administration

- Scot Beckerman, superintendent. Beckerman took office July 1, 2015, succeeding John J. Petrelli, who was serving as interim superintendent. Beckerman announced in June 2025 that he will be retiring on January 1, 2027.
- Sue Anne Mather, board secretary and business administrator

School administration

The school's principal is Joseph J. Occhino. His administration team includes two assistant principals.

== Board of education ==
The district's board of education, comprised of nine elected members, sets policy and oversees the fiscal and educational operation of the district through its administration. As a Type II school district, the board's trustees are elected directly by voters to serve three-year terms of office on a staggered basis, with three seats up for election each year held (since 2012) as part of the November general election; an additional board member is appointed to represent Saddle River. The board appoints a superintendent to oversee the district's day-to-day operations and a business administrator to supervise the business functions of the district. Ten seats on the board are allocated based on the percentage of students from each district, with five seats assigned to Upper Saddle River, four to Allendale and one to Ho-Ho-Kus. Saddle River, whose student enrollment is below 10% of the total, is assigned a single non-voting representative.

== Notable alumni ==
- Beth Beglin (born 1957), field hockey player who represented the United States three times at the Summer Olympics
- Kyah Cahill (born 2003), footballer who last played for the Lusail Football Academy
- James Comey (born 1960), seventh director of the Federal Bureau of Investigation
- Margaret Juntwait (born 1957), Metropolitan Opera radio broadcasts announcer
- Ken Levine (born 1966), video game developer who is the creative director and co-founder of Ghost Story Games
- Maria Pitillo (born 1966), actress who appeared in the 1998 film Godzilla
- Daniel Ribeiro (born 1989), former artistic gymnast who is head coach of the Illinois Fighting Illini men's gymnastics team
- Kevin J. Rooney (born 1960, class of 1977), politician who has represented the 40th Legislative District in the New Jersey General Assembly since 2016
- Danielle Schulmann (born 1989), soccer player who plays as a forward for the Israel women's national team
- Chloe Troast (born 1997, class of 2015), comedian and actress, who joined the cast of the NBC sketch comedy series Saturday Night Live in 2023 for its 49th season
- Chris Wylde (born 1976), actor and comedian
