= Ramsey High School =

Public secondary school in Bergen County, New Jersey, United

Ramsey

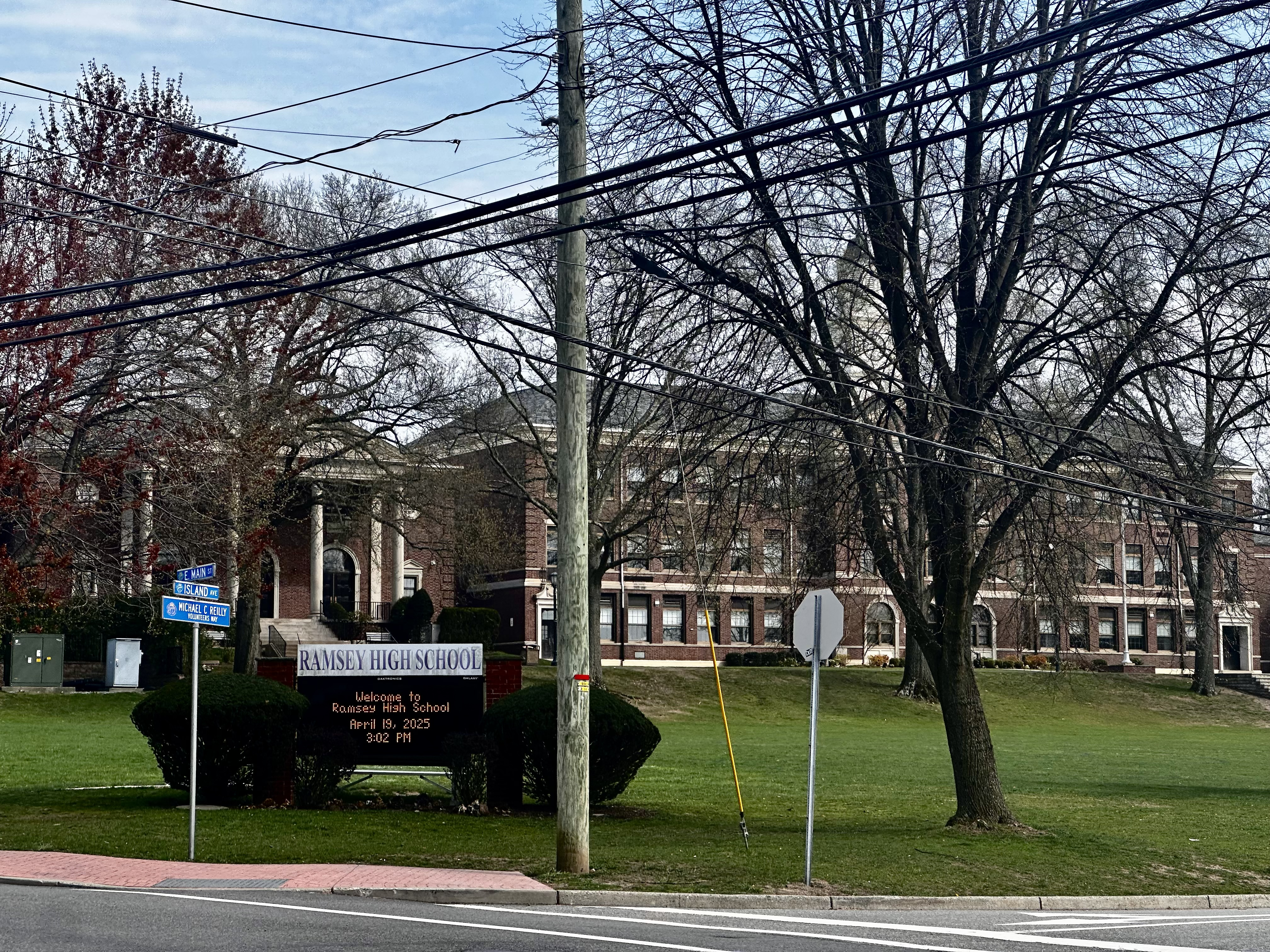
- Ramsey High School in 2025

Location
- 256 East Main Street; Ramsey, Bergen County, New Jersey 07446; United States; 41.05774°N 74.136609°W

Information
- Type: Public high school
- Established: 1909
- School district: Ramsey Public School District
- NCES School ID: 341359000730
- Principal: Michael J. Thumm
- Faculty: 77.8 FTEs
- Grades: 9-12
- Enrollment: 773 (as of 2023–24)
- Student to teacher ratio: 9.9:1
- Colors: Blue and gold
- Athletics conference: Big North Conference (general); North Jersey Super Football Conference (football)
- Team name: Rams
- Rival: Mahwah High School
- Publication: Opus (literary magazine)
- Newspaper: The Ram
- Yearbook: Nugget
- Website: www.ramsey.k12.nj.us/o/rhs

Ramsey High School, established in 1909, is a four-year comprehensive community public high school serving students in ninth through twelfth grades from Ramsey, in Bergen County, in the U.S. state of New Jersey, operating as the lone secondary school of the Ramsey Public School District. Students from Saddle River attend the district's middle school and then have the option of attending either Ramsey High School or Northern Highlands Regional High School as part of sending/receiving relationships with each of the respective districts.

As of the 2023–24 school year, the school had an enrollment of 773 students and 77.8 classroom teachers (on an FTE basis), for a student–teacher ratio of 9.9:1. There were 31 students (4.0% of enrollment) eligible for free lunch and 7 (0.9% of students) eligible for reduced-cost lunch.

Ramsey High School is accredited by the New Jersey Department of Education.

== History ==
The first class to graduate from Ramsey was the class of 1908, who attended high school in the current Borough Hall. After that, students went to John Y. Dater School, which was a regional K-12 school at the time. The first Ramsey High School was constructed in 1912, with the first commencement held in June 1913. An addition was constructed in 1923. By 1935, additional space was needed, and a new building was proposed to take advantage of funding available through the New Deal-era Public Works Administration. Groundbreaking ceremonies for the new building were held on January 16, 1936, and the "New Ramsey High School", completed at a cost of $600,000 (equivalent to $13.4 million in 2025), was dedicated in June 1937.

With baby boomers filling the school beyond capacity, the school informed its sending districts of Franklin Lakes and Wyckoff that it would no longer accept students from those two communities at the high school beyond the 1956–57 school year; the two communities joined Oakland to form the Ramapo Indian Hills Regional High School District, which opened its doors in 1957 at Ramapo High School.

At the start of the 1957–58 school year, Ramsey was accepting students from Allendale, Mahwah, Saddle River and Upper Saddle River. Allendale, Mahwah and Upper Saddle River left the school in September 1958 once Mahwah High School was completed.

== Awards, recognition and rankings ==
The school was the 22nd-ranked public high school in New Jersey out of 339 schools statewide in New Jersey Monthly magazine's September 2014 cover story on the state's "Top Public High Schools", using a new ranking methodology. The school had been ranked 30th in the state of 328 schools in 2012, after being ranked 33rd in 2010 out of 322 schools listed. The magazine ranked the school 13th in 2008 out of 316 schools. The school was ranked 27th in the magazine's September 2006 issue, which included 316 schools across the state. Schooldigger.com ranked the school tied for 29th out of 381 public high schools statewide in its 2011 rankings (a decrease of 14 positions from the 2010 ranking) which were based on the combined percentage of students classified as proficient or above proficient on the mathematics (93.2%) and language arts literacy (99.1%) components of the High School Proficiency Assessment (HSPA).

In its 2013 report on "America's Best High Schools", The Daily Beast ranked the school 805th in the nation among participating public high schools and 58th among schools in New Jersey.

In the 2011 "Ranking America's High Schools" issue by The Washington Post, the school was ranked 61st in New Jersey and 1,743rd nationwide. Ramsey High School was recognized by Newsweek magazine as one of the top 500 high schools in the nation.

In 2010, on New Jersey's High School Proficiency Assessment (HSPA), 97.2% of 2010 graduates scored at the proficient or advanced proficient level on the math section, while 98.6% of Ramsey High School students scored at the proficient or advanced proficient levels on the language arts sections of the test. 93% of Ramsey High School's 2010 graduating class took the SAT. Student scores exceeded state averages, with those taking the exam averaging 563 on the math section (vs. 520 for all test takers in New Jersey), 576 on the verbal section (vs. 515) and scored 515 on the essay portion of the exam (vs. 515 statewide).

== Diploma requirements ==
In order to graduate with a diploma, students must complete 120 credits consisting of 4 years of English / Language Arts; 1 year of Physical Education, Health, and Safety for each year of enrollment; 2 years of United States History; 1 year of World History / Cultures; 3 years of Mathematics; 3 years of Science; 2 years of World Language; 5 credits of Fine Arts and 5 credits of Practical Arts. Cross-content workplace readiness skills, which are integrated into content areas in grades 9–12. All students, unless specifically exempted, must pass the Eleventh Grade HSPA as required by the State of New Jersey. All students must also take a state mandated Biology test when they take biology (freshman year for honors students and sophomore year for CP and MCP students).

== Extracurricular activities ==
=== Marching Band ===
Ramsey High School's Big Blue marching band was the 2005 Musical Arts Conference NJ State Champion and the 2005 Tournament of Bands Chapter 10 Group 4 Champion. The band also won 7th place in Group 4 at the Atlantic Coast Championship held in Hersheypark Stadium in November 2011. The band is under the direction of Joshua Jenkins, who took over in 2020 from the previous band director, Clifford Bialkin. In 2015, Big Blue won 5th place at the Atlantic Coast Championships. The band was invited to play in the 2015–2016 New Year's Day Parade and again in the 2019–2020 New Year's Day Parade in Rome, Italy. The band represented the state of New Jersey in the 2017, 2019 and 2023 National Memorial Day Parade in Washington, D.C. The color guard has a separate season and they compete during the winter. The winter guard, nicknamed “Velocity”, competes in the MAIN circuit, and they won first place in 2018.

=== Athletics ===
The Ramsey High School Rams compete in the Big North Conference, which is comprised of public and private high schools in Bergen and Passaic counties, and was established following a reorganization of sports leagues in Northern New Jersey by the New Jersey State Interscholastic Athletic Association (NJSIAA). Prior to the 2010 realignment, the school participated in the North Bergen Interscholastic Athletic League (NBIL/NBIAL). With 642 students in grades 10–12, the school was classified by the NJSIAA for the 2019–20 school year as Group II for most athletic competition purposes, which included schools with an enrollment of 486 to 758 students in that grade range. The football team competes in the American Red division of the North Jersey Super Football Conference, which includes 112 schools competing in 20 divisions, making it the nation's biggest football-only high school sports league. The school was classified by the NJSIAA as Group II North for football for 2024–2026, which included schools with 484 to 683 students. Most sports have both a Varsity and a Junior Varsity team, and many sports have Freshmen teams. (Inclusion of "boys"/"girls" designates two distinct teams, even if both practice together.) Teams marked with an asterisk (*), although technically separate teams that compete and score independently of each other, usually practice and compete alongside the opposite sex's team of the same sport. Sports offered include:

- Fall sports teams: Football, Soccer (boys), Soccer (girls), Cross country (boys), Cross country (girls), Field hockey, Tennis (girls), Volleyball (girls), and Cheerleading
- Winter sports teams: Basketball (boys), Basketball (girls), Bowling (boys)*, Bowling (girls)*, Track (boys)*, Track (girls)*, Ice hockey, Swimming (boys)*, Swimming (girls)* Wrestling (boys), Wrestling (girls), and Fencing (individual)
- Spring sports teams: Baseball (boys), Softball (girls), Track (boys)*, Track (girls)*, Golf (boys)*, Golf (girls)*, Tennis (boys), Lacrosse (boys) and Lacrosse (girls)

The school has won state championships in multiple sports.

The field hockey won the Group III title in 1976, as co-champions with Moorestown High School after a 1–1 tite in the playoff final.

The boys' cross country won the Group III state title in 1978.

The softball team has won championships in Group II in 1982 (with a 5–4 win against Northern Burlington County Regional High School in the finals), 2015 vs. (Robbinsville High School), 2019 (vs. Bordentown Regional High School); Group III in 1991 (finishing 32–0 after a 1–0 win vs. Cumberland Regional High School), 2015 (vs. Robbinsville High School) and 2019 (vs. Bordentown Regional High School) NJ.com / The Star-Ledger ranked Ramsey as their number-one softball team in the state in 1991.

The girls' volleyball team won the Group II state championship in 1995, defeating runner-up Lyndhurst High School.

The girls' cross country running team won the Group II state title in 1995–1997.

Boys' track and field - Group II (1999)

The girls' soccer team won the Group II state title in 2000 (vs. Delran High School), 2001 (vs. Freehold High School in double overtime) and 2011 (vs. Robbinsville High School)

The boys golf team won the All Groups title in 2001 and the Group II championship in 2014.

The football team won the North I Group II state sectional title in 2002 and 2009. In 2002, the Rams football team went 11–1 capturing the New Jersey State Interscholastic Athletic Association (NJSIAA) North I Group II state championship for the first time in school history, with a 7–6 win over Hoboken High School. In 2009 the Rams football team went 10–2 and won their second NJSIAA North I Group II football championship with a 36–10 victory over River Dell High School.

The boys' soccer team won the Group II championship in 2007, defeating runner-up Cinnaminson High School. The 2007 boys' soccer team won the North I, Group II state sectional championship with a 5–0 win over Tenafly High School in the tournament final. The team moved on to win the Group II state championship, the first ever by the program, with a 3–1 win over Cinnaminson.

The ice hockey won in Public B in 2009 and 2016.

== Administration ==
The school's principal is Michael J. Thumm.

== Notable alumni ==
- Jim Alexander (born 1935), documentary photographer, photojournalist and activist
- Richard W. DeKorte (1936–1979), politician who served as a member of the New Jersey General Assembly
- Kevin Foelsch (born 2001), professional NFL football player
- Jeremiah Fraites (born 1986), founding member of The Lumineers
- Jack Hewson (1924–2012), professional basketball player who played for the Boston Celtics during the 1947–48 season
- Mike Laga (born 1960), first baseman who played in MLB for the Detroit Tigers, St. Louis Cardinals and San Francisco Giants
- William S. McFeely (1930–2019), historian who won the Pulitzer Prize for his 1981 biography of Ulysses S. Grant
- Jeffrey Nordling (born 1962, class of 1980), actor who has appeared in film and on television
- Bill Pellington (1927–1994), American football linebacker who played 12 seasons in the NFL for the Baltimore Colts
- Caroline Pennell (born 1995), competitor on the 2013 season of The Voice, who finished in eighth
- Jimmie Rivera (born 1989), professional mixed martial artist who competed in UFC as a bantamweight
- Wesley Schultz (born 1982, class of 2001), founding member of The Lumineers
- George Verwer (1938–2023), founder of Operation Mobilisation, a Christian missions organization
