= River Edge Elementary School District =

School district in Bergen County, New Jersey, US

Address
- 410 Bogert Road River Edge, Bergen County, New Jersey, 07661
- Coordinates: 40.921387°N 74.036438°W

District information
- Grades: PreK-6
- Superintendent: Lisa Bernardo (acting)
- Business administrator: Louise Napolitano
- Schools: 2

Students and staff
- Enrollment: 1,189 (as of 2022–23)
- Faculty: 101.0 FTEs
- Student–teacher ratio: 11.8:1

Other information
- District Factor Group: I
- Website: www.riveredgeschools.org
Ind.	Per pupil	District spending	Rank (*)	K-6 average	%± vs. average
1A	Total Spending	$15,076	7	$18,891	−20.2%
1	Budgetary Cost	12,915	15	13,649	−5.4%
2	Classroom Instruction	8,451	22	8,366	1.0%
6	Support Services	1,882	17	2,161	−12.9%
8	Administrative Cost	1,492	24	1,467	1.7%
10	Operations & Maintenance	1,081	4	1,552	−30.3%
16	Median Teacher Salary	61,539	41	57,437
Data from NJDoE 2014 Taxpayers' Guide to Education Spending. *Of K-6 districts with any number of students. Lowest spending=1; Highest=59

The River Edge Elementary School District is a community public school district that serves students in pre-kindergarten through sixth grade from River Edge, in Bergen County, in the U.S. state of New Jersey.

As of the 2022–23 school year, the district, composed of two schools, had an enrollment of 1,189 students and 101.0 classroom teachers (on an FTE basis), for a student–teacher ratio of 11.8:1.

The district is classified by the New Jersey Department of Education as being in District Factor Group "I", the second-highest of eight groupings. District Factor Groups organize districts statewide to allow comparison by common socioeconomic characteristics of the local districts. From lowest socioeconomic status to highest, the categories are A, B, CD, DE, FG, GH, I and J.

River Edge and neighboring Oradell share a combined public school district for seventh through twelfth grades, River Dell Regional School District which was established in 1958. As of the 2022–23 school year, the high school district, comprised of two schools, had an enrollment of 1,613 students and 138.4 classroom teachers (on an FTE basis), for a student–teacher ratio of 11.7:1. Schools in the district (with 2022–23 enrollment data from the National Center for Education Statistics) are River Dell Regional Middle School in River Edge (with 589 students in grades 7-8) and River Dell High School in Oradell (with 982 students in grades 9-12).

== Awards and recognition ==
During the 1998-99 school year, Cherry Hill School received the Blue Ribbon Award from the United States Department of Education, the highest honor that an American school can achieve.

== Schools ==
Schools in the district (with 2022–23 enrollment data from the National Center for Education Statistics) are:

- Cherry Hill School / New Bridge Center (with 713 students in grades PreK-6) which is on the south side of the borough.
  - Denise Heitman, principal
- Roosevelt School (with 478 students in grades 1-6) which is located on the north side of the borough.
  - Michael Henzel, principal

Curriculum review is an ongoing process in River Edge. Current educational research, the New Jersey Core Curriculum Content Standards, as well as national subject standards are used in the curriculum development. This process ensures that each curricular area is comprehensive and reflects current educational thought.

The district's per pupil comparable costs are below average while teachers salaries are above the statewide median.

== Administration ==
Core members of the district's administration are:

- Lisa Bernardo, acting superintendent of schools
- Louise Napolitano, school business administrator and board secretary

== Board of education ==
The district's board of education, comprised of seven members, sets policy and oversees the fiscal and educational operation of the district through its administration. As a Type II school district, the board's trustees are elected directly by voters to serve three-year terms of office on a staggered basis, with either two or three seats up for election each year held (since 2012) as part of the November general election. The board appoints a superintendent to oversee the district's day-to-day operations and a business administrator to supervise the business functions of the district.
