= Oradell Public School District =

School district in Bergen County, New Jersey, US

Address
- 350 Prospect Avenue Oradell, Bergen County, New Jersey, 07649; United States
- Coordinates: 40.953258°N 74.035637°W

District information
- Grades: K-6
- Superintendent: Megan N. Bozios
- Business administrator: Peter Iappelli
- Schools: 1

Students and staff
- Enrollment: 817 (as of 2022–23)
- Faculty: 63.0 FTEs
- Student–teacher ratio: 13.0:1

Other information
- District Factor Group: I
- Website: www.oradellschool.org
Ind.	Per pupil	District spending	Rank (*)	K-6 average	%± vs. average
1A	Total Spending	$15,303	9	$18,891	−19.0%
1	Budgetary Cost	12,721	12	13,649	−6.8%
2	Classroom Instruction	7,670	10	8,366	−8.3%
6	Support Services	1,990	22	2,161	−7.9%
8	Administrative Cost	1,624	30	1,467	10.7%
10	Operations & Maintenance	1,414	21	1,552	−8.9%
13	Extracurricular Activities	16	12	39	−59.0%
16	Median Teacher Salary	55,580	23	57,437
Data from NJDoE 2014 Taxpayers' Guide to Education Spending. *Of K-6 districts with any number of students. Lowest spending=1; Highest=59

The Oradell Public School District is a community public school district that serves students in kindergarten through sixth grade from Oradell, in Bergen County, in the U.S. state of New Jersey. The district consists of a single school, Oradell Public School.

As of the 2022–23 school year, the district, comprised of one school, had an enrollment of 817 students and 63.0 classroom teachers (on an FTE basis), for a student–teacher ratio of 13.0:1.

The district had been classified by the New Jersey Department of Education as being in District Factor Group "I", the second-highest of eight groupings. District Factor Groups organize districts statewide to allow comparison by common socioeconomic characteristics of the local districts. From lowest socioeconomic status to highest, the categories are A, B, CD, DE, FG, GH, I and J.

Oradell and neighboring River Edge share a combined school district for seventh through twelfth grades, River Dell Regional School District, which was established in 1958. Schools in the district (with 2019–20 enrollment data from the National Center for Education Statistics) are River Dell Regional Middle School in River Edge with 541 students in grades 7-8 and River Dell High School in Oradell with 1,062 students in grades 9-12.

== School ==
Oradell Public School served an enrollment of 758 students as of the 2019–20 school year.

- Michelle Hawley, principal

== Administration ==
The members of the district's administration are:

- Megan N. Bozios, superintendent
- Peter Iappelli, business administrator and board secretary

== Board of education ==
The district's board of education, comprised of nine members, sets policy and oversees the fiscal and educational operation of the district through its administration. As a Type II school district, the board's trustees are elected directly by voters to serve three-year terms of office on a staggered basis, with three seats up for election each year held (since 2012) as part of the November general election. The board appoints a superintendent to oversee the district's day-to-day operations and a business administrator to supervise the business functions of the district.
