= Joe Shaute =

American baseball player (1899–1970)

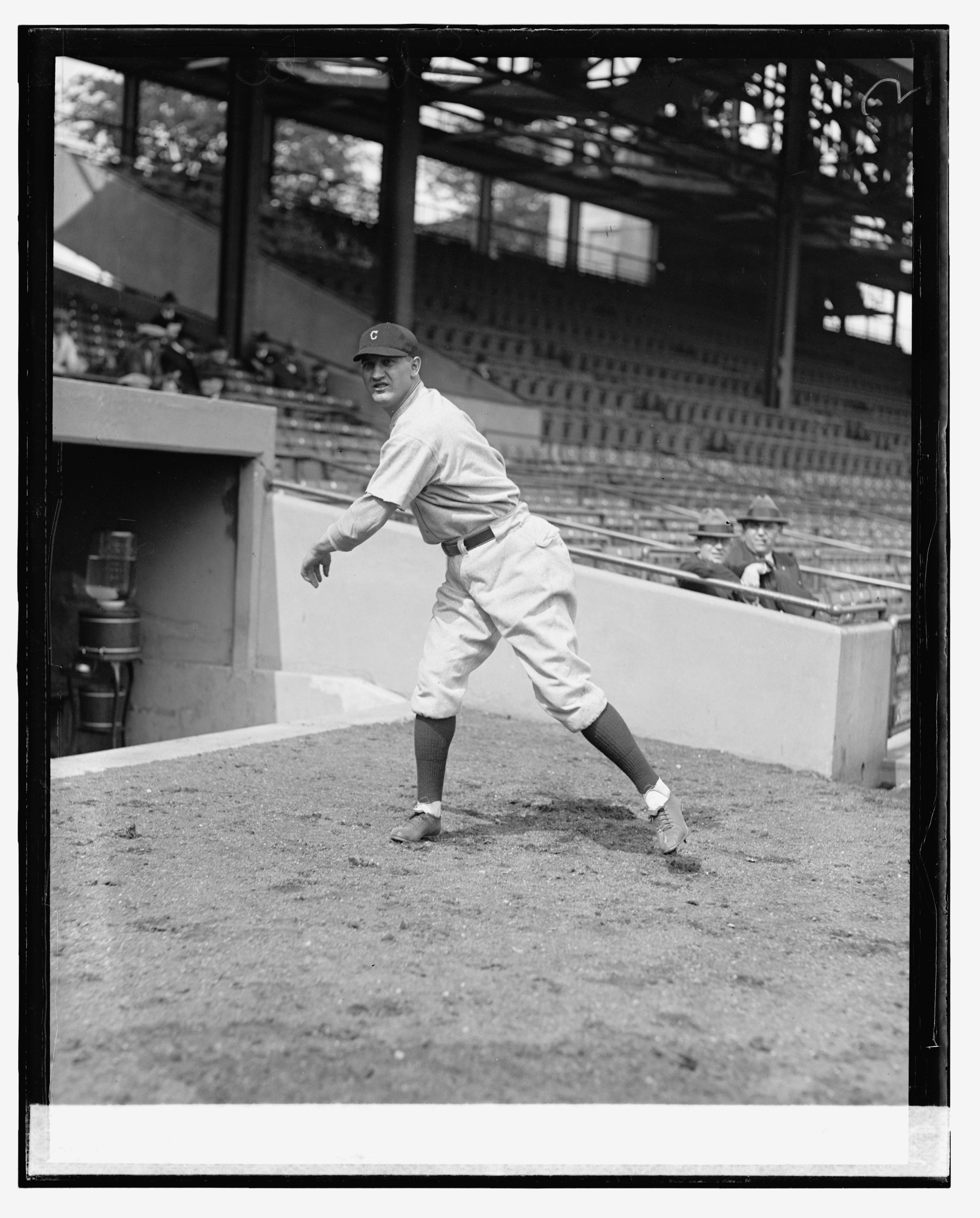
- Pitcher
- Born: August 1, 1899; Peckville, Pennsylvania, U.S.
- Died: February 21, 1970 (aged 70); Scranton, Pennsylvania, U.S.
- Batted: Left Threw: Left

MLB debut
- July 6, 1922, for the Cleveland Indians

Last MLB appearance
- May 24, 1934, for the Cincinnati Reds

MLB statistics
- Win–loss record: 99–109
- Earned run average: 4.15
- Strikeouts: 512
- Stats at Baseball Reference

Teams
- Cleveland Indians (1922–1930); Brooklyn Robins/Dodgers (1931–1933); Cincinnati Reds (1934)

Joseph Benjamin Shaute (August 1, 1899 – February 21, 1970) was an American pitcher in Major League Baseball. He pitched from 1922 to 1934, and during his 13-year career, he played primarily for the Cleveland Indians. He attended Juniata College and Mansfield University of Pennsylvania.

He made his major league debut in September 1922, and threw his first pitch to legendary swatter Babe Ruth. Baseball historian William C. Kashatus noted that when Shaute came to the pitching mound, "the Indians were clinging to a one-run lead in the bottom of the eighth with two outs and bases loaded with Yankees". Shaute gained notoriety when he struck out Ruth on four pitches to end the inning. In the following inning, he faced another powerful hitter, Bob Meusel, who "swung so hard on Shaute's first offering that he whirled completely around and fell to the ground". The pitcher next struck out Yankee catcher Freddie Hoffman. Kashatus observed that Shaute "continued to dominate Ruth for the next three years".

The situation changed in 1927, however, when Ruth hit 60 home runs, setting a major league record that stood for more than seven decades. Ruth hit three of those home runs—numbers 30, 40, and 52—off of Shaute. Nevertheless, during his 13-season career, Shaute struck out Ruth on more than 30 occasions.

Shaute enjoyed his best season in 1924, "when he won 20 games for the lowly Indians who finished sixth that year".

As a hitter, Shaute was a better than average hitting pitcher, posting a .258 batting average (170-for-660) with 63 runs, 1 home run, 64 RBI and drawing 40 bases on balls.

Born in Peckville, Pennsylvania, Shaute died of cancer in nearby Scranton on February 21, 1970, aged 70.
