= Marie Rossi =

American military pilot (1959–1991)

Marie Therese Rossi-Cayton
- Major Rossi-Cayton
- Born: January 3, 1959; Oradell, New Jersey, U.S.
- Died: March 1, 1991 (aged 32); Saudi Arabia
- Burial place: Arlington National Cemetery; Arlington, Virginia; 38.87170°N 77.06594°W
- Spouse: CWO John Anderson Cayton
- Military career
- Allegiance: United States of America
- Branch: United States Army
- Service years: 1980–1991
- Rank: Major
- Unit: 18th Aviation Brigade
- Commands: B Co, 2d / 159th Aviation Regiment; A Co, 1st / 58th Aviation Regiment
- Conflicts: Persian Gulf War
- Awards: 14/13

Marie Therese Rossi-Cayton (January 3, 1959 – March 1, 1991) was the first woman in American military history to serve in combat as an aviation unit commander, during the Persian Gulf War in 1991, and the first woman pilot in United States history to fly combat missions. She was killed when the CH-47 Chinook she was piloting crashed in Saudi Arabia, on March 1, 1991.

== Early life and education ==
Rossi was born in Oradell, New Jersey, on January 3, 1959, the third of four children born to Paul and Gertrude Rossi. Her father was a book bindery treasurer, and her mother was a secretary for a Wall Street firm. In 1976, she graduated from River Dell Regional High School and began attending Dickinson College, where she also joined the Reserve Officers' Training Corps. Rossi graduated in 1980, with a Bachelor of Science in Psychology.

== Career ==
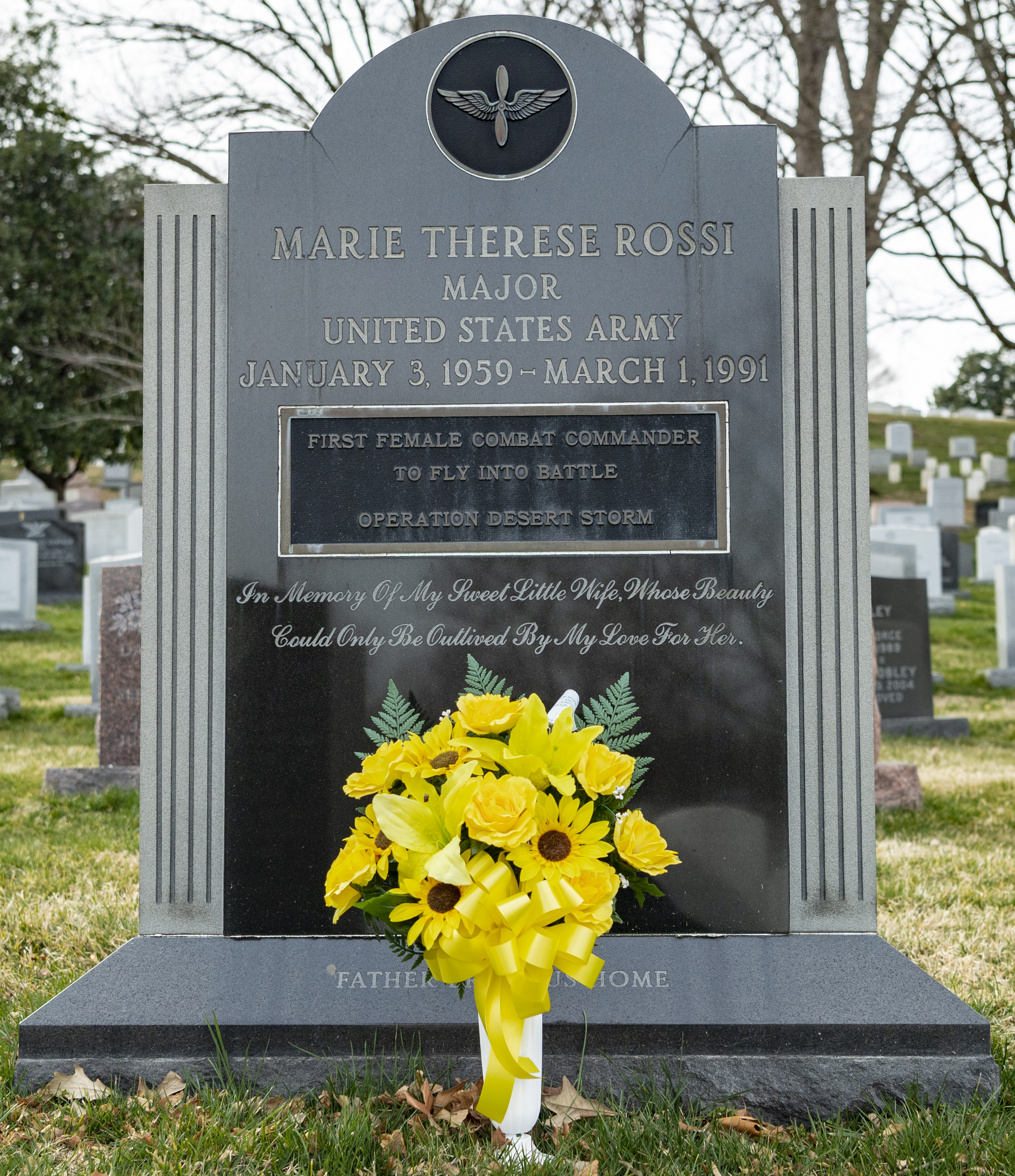
Grave at Arlington National Cemetery

What I'm doing is no greater or less than the man who is flying next to me or in back of me ...

As a Captain, Rossi was selected to attend Army Flight School at Fort Rucker. She was assigned to the Charter Member Class of the Army Aviation Branch in 1985 which included many notable graduates. This class was composed entirely of Commissioned Officers. The class was designed to commemorate the establishment of the branch for the first time since The Army Air Corps became the US Air Force after WWII. As the ranking officer she was made the class leader.

Rossi served as a CH-47 Chinook pilot with the 18th Aviation Brigade, commanding B Company, 2nd Battalion, 159th Aviation Regiment, 24th Infantry Division, stationed at Hunter Army Airfield, Savannah, Georgia. Her company deployed to Saudi Arabia in support of Operation Desert Shield in 1990. Rossi was interviewed by CNN prior to the ground assault by Coalition forces. She said,

Sometimes, you have to disassociate how you feel personally about the prospect of going into war and, you know, possibly see the death that's going to be out there. But personally, as an aviator and a soldier, this is the moment that everybody trains for – that I've trained for – so I feel ready to meet a challenge.

Rossi led a flight of her company's CH-47 Chinook helicopters 50 miles (80 km) into Iraq on February 24, 1991, ferrying fuel and ammunition during the very first hours of the ground assault by the Coalition Forces. Her company would be involved in supply missions throughout the war.

She was killed when her helicopter crashed into an unlit microwave tower in Northern Saudi Arabia on March 1, 1991, the day after the ceasefire agreement. She was buried on March 11, 1991, with full military honors at Arlington National Cemetery.

== Personal life ==
Rossi met fellow pilot Chief Warrant Officer 4 John Anderson Cayton Sr. while assigned to the 213th Combat Aviation Company in South Korea. They were married in Savannah, Georgia, in June 1990.

== Military awards ==
Rossi's military decorations and awards include:

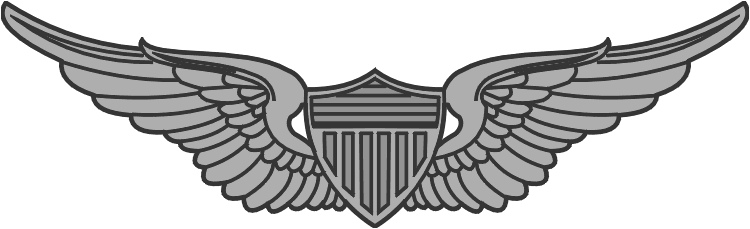

Badge	Army Aviator Badge		
1st row	Bronze Star Medal	Purple Heart	Meritorious Service Medal
2nd row	Air Medal	Army Commendation Medal	Army Achievement Medal
3rd row	National Defense Service Medal	Southwest Asia Service Medal with two bronze service stars for two designated campaigns	Army Service Ribbon
4th row	Army Overseas Service Ribbon	Kuwait Liberation Medal (Saudi Arabia)	Kuwait Liberation Medal (Kuwait)
