= Steve Goepel =

American football player and coach (born 1949)

Profile
- Position: Quarterback

Personal information
- Born: January 22, 1949 (age 77); Teaneck, New Jersey, U.S.
- Listed height: 6 ft 2 in (1.88 m)
- Listed weight: 210 lb (95 kg)

Career information
- High school: River Dell Regional (NJ)
- College: Colgate
- NFL draft: 1971: 12th round, 311th overall pick

Career history

Playing
- Dallas Cowboys (1971)*; New England Patriots (1972)*
- * Offseason or practice squad member only

Coaching
- Elmwood Park Memorial HS (1975) Freshman; River Dell HS (1976–1979) Quarterbacks coach Wide receivers coach; Ramapo College (1980) Quarterbacks coach; Ramapo College (1981–1984) Head coach

Awards and highlights
- Super Bowl champion (VI)

Head coaching record
- Career: 23–12–2

Steve Goepel (born January 22, 1949) is an American former football quarterback in the National Football League (NFL) for the New England Patriots. He also was a football head coach at Ramapo College. He played college football at Colgate University

== Early life ==
Goepel attended River Dell Regional High School, where he practiced football, basketball and baseball. He accepted a football scholarship from Colgate University, where he was coached by Neil Wheelwright.

As a sophomore, he was a backup at quarterback behind Ron Burton. As a junior, he was named the starter at quarterback, posting 88-of-182 completions for 1,196 yards, 7 touchdowns and 11 interceptions.

As a senior, he completed 137-of-309 completions for 1,802 yards, 15 touchdowns and 19 interceptions. He also was the team's placekicker, making his only field goal attempt and 16 out of 17 extra point conversions.

Goepel finished his college career with 258-of-547 completions for 3,336 yards, 25 touchdowns and 34 interceptions. He also set 9 school records, including passing ards, total offense and punting.

He played first base on the baseball team, where he batted .360 as a senior.

== Professional career ==
Goepel was selected by the Dallas Cowboys in the 12th round (311th overall) of the 1971 NFL draft. He was waived on September 7. It was reported in the media that after he was cut, the Washington Redskins invited Goepel for a tryout, that turned into an interrogation session by then head coach George Allen, to obtain information about the Cowboys offense.

In 1972, he was signed as a free agent by the New England Patriots. He was the team's third-string quarterback and spent the season on the taxi squad. He was released on July 26, 1973.

== Coaching career ==
Goepel was the quarterback and receiver coach at River Dell Regional High School from 1976 to 1979. He served as the head football coach at Ramapo College from 1981 to 1984, compiling a record of 23–12–2.

=== Head coaching record ===
Year	Team	Overall	Conference	Standing	Bowl/playoffs
Ramapo Roadrunners (New Jersey State Athletic Conference) (1981–1984)
1981	Ramapo	6–2–1	4–1–1	2nd	
1982	Ramapo	7–3	3–3	T–3rd	
1983	Ramapo	5–4	2–4	T–4th	
1984	Ramapo	5–3–1	2–3–1	4th	
Ramapo:		23–12–2	11–11–2		
Total:		23–12–2			
