= Huntington Learning Center =

Educational learning center franchise

Huntington Learning Centers, Inc. Huntington Mark, LLC
- Company type: Private
- Industry: Education, Tutoring
- Founded: 1977
- Headquarters: Oradell, New Jersey, United States
- Website: huntingtonhelps.com

Huntington Learning Center is a franchise of educational learning centers in the United States offering in-center and online tutoring services. Huntington is the oldest provider of supplemental educational services for primary and secondary students in the United States. It offers reading, writing, mathematics, phonics, and study skills instruction, math and science subject tutoring, as well as test preparation for the SAT, PSAT, ACT, GED, Regents, ASVAB, AP Exams, high school entrance exams and more.

Huntington Learning Centers, Inc., located in Oradell, New Jersey, is the parent company that franchises learning center locations.

== History ==
Huntington Learning Center was founded in 1977 by Dr. Raymond Huntington and his wife Eileen. The couple opened a second center in 1978 and began franchising locations in 1985. The company grew aggressively during the 1980s and 1990s, and by 1999, the chain had opened 200 units.

In 2000, Huntington defaulted on payments to some of its creditors, which filed a court petition seeking involuntary Chapter 7 bankruptcy. Huntington fought the petition and repaid the creditors. The company subsequently slowed its growth and sold some of its company-owned stores. In 2012 they rebranded as Huntington Your Tutoring Solutions.

== See also ==
- Storefront school
