= Bonnie August =

American fashion designer (1947–2003)

- Born: January 2, 1947; River Edge, New Jersey, U.S.
- Died: August 9, 2003 (aged 56); Manhattan, New York City, New York, U.S.
- Education: Syracuse University; Fashion Institute of Technology; Parsons School of Design
- Occupation: Fashion designer

Bonnie J. August (January 2, 1947 – August 9, 2003) was an American fashion designer. In the 1970s, she innovated the disco-era look of unitards under wrap skirts. She favored stretchy materials such as spandex and was among the first designers to incorporate prints and bright colors in activewear. She won a Coty Award in 1978 for "changing the way women dressed". August graduated from Syracuse University and was hired as a design director by Danskin in 1975. She wrote the 1981 book The Complete Bonnie August Dress Thin System. She started the labels Bonnie August Activewear and Bodywear and the Bonnie August Design Studio. Her designs are in the collections of New York's Fashion Institute of Technology museum and the Metropolitan Museum of Art.

== Early life and education ==
Bonnie J. August was born on January 2, 1947, in River Edge, New Jersey. She earned a BFA in fabric design from Syracuse University in 1968. She later studied knitwear design at the Fashion Institute of Technology, jewelry design at the Haystack School of Arts and Crafts and the Craft Students League, and computer graphics at the Parsons School of Design.

== Fashion career ==
Following her graduation from Syracuse, August was a guest fashion editor for Mademoiselle magazine. She designed accessories and worked for Aspen Skiwear in 1971, designing ski clothing.

August was hired as a design director for the women's clothing brand Danskin in 1975. Her designs were inspired by sportswear, particularly ballet dancewear, including tights, leggings, and leotards. In 1975 she created the collection Freestyle which paired knit leotards with jeans or skirts. She added a self-tie wrap skirt the following year. The late-1970s disco look, with a wraparound skirt over a unitard, was innovated by August. She used stretchy materials such as spandex in her bodywear and unitard designs. She also designed crop tops, tunics, and stirrup pants. She was among the first fashion designers to use prints and bright colors rather than just black for activewear. Dancewear and exercise clothing became a trend in mainstream fashion and staples of casual women's clothing. August won a special Coty Award in 1978 for "changing the way women dressed".

Magazines that featured her designs included People, Women's Wear Daily, Harper's Bazaar, the Sports Illustrated Swimsuit Issue and Vogue. A 1979 feature about August in People was entitled "Danskin Designer Bonnie August Has Got Almost Everybody Going Around in Next to Nothing."

In her designs, August made considerations for women's body shapes, favoring designs that were thinning. She also published a list of tips for dressing thin. She wrote the 1981 book The Complete Bonnie August Dress Thin System, which included one thousand of her sketches and diagrams. She devised an alphabetical Body ID scale for classifying body shapes that allowed for the combination of frontal and side views.

After leaving Danskin in 1984, she started the label Bonnie August Activewear and Bodywear. She was designer and president of the company until 1993. She then founded the Bonnie August Design Studio, with clothing sold at major department stores around the United States. Her companies were among the first designer-branded activewear labels, producing stretch sportswear, outerwear, hosiery, gymwear, socks and graphic T-shirts.

== Personal and later life ==
August married Carl Van Brunt in 1981. They had one son and later divorced.

August was inducted into the Council of Fashion Directors of America in 1986. She was involved in fundraising with Fashion Group International and the Council of Fashion Designers of America.

August was diagnosed with cancer in 1997. She recovered and joined Wells Hosiery to start an online catalogue business that donated some of its profits to charity in 2001. She died of ovarian cancer on August 9, 2003, in Manhattan.

August's designs are in the collections of New York's Fashion Institute of Technology museum, Seattle's Rock 'n' Roll Museum, and the Metropolitan Museum of Art.
