= Reino Aarnio =

American architect

Reino Aarnio AIA
- Born: December 8, 1912; Turku, Grand Duchy of Finland, Russian Empire
- Died: February 12, 1988 (aged 75); New Jersey, United States
- Occupation: Architect
- Known for: Principal in Reino Aarnio

Reino Aarnio AIA (December 8, 1912 – February 12, 1988) was an American architect based in New York City, who established the Reino Aarnio firm in 1948 and worked in New Jersey and New York.

== Early life and education ==
Born in December 8, 1912 in Turku, Finland, Aarnio emigrated to the United States in 1920. He earned his bachelor of architecture from New York University in 1938, graduating cum laude. He won the F.B. Morse Prize in 1935 and the Sherrill Prize in 1936.

== Architectural career ==
Aarnio joined the American Institute of Architects New York Chapter in 1948 and established his own firm that year. In 1967, he was an associate professor at the New York Institute of Technology. He was also the chairman of the Arts and Architecture committee of the Finlandia Foundation from 1960; the vice chairman of the Zoning Board of Appeals, River Edge, New Jersey, from 1965; architectural consultant for the American-Scandinavian Foundation Scholarship Awards Committee from 1965; and liaison as the planning board of River Edge, New Jersey, from 1969.

== Awards and publications ==
Aarnio received a Citation for Excellence for the U.S. Exhibition in Sweden, Poland and Greece, Veterans of Foreign Wars in 1959. He was knighted by Government of Finland in 1963. He received a Best Municipal Library Award for Paramus Public Library, Paramus, New Jersey in the Book of the Month Club, 1965. He was published in numerous articles, which featured contributions on architecture and design in books and magazines. He was a member of the Board of Trustees for the Scandinavian Seminar for University Level Studies in Scandinavia from 1959.

== Personal life ==
Reino Aarnio was married to Sylvia (Bachman) Aarnio, a coloratura soprano and graduate of the Juilliard School of Music.

== Works ==
- 1956: U.S. Exhibit for the St. Eric's Trade Fair in Stockholm, Sweden
- 1956: U.S. Administration Building, Library And Exhibition Hall [Stockholm, Sweden)
- 1957: U.S. Exhibit at the International Trade Fair in Poznan, Poland
- 1958: U.S. Administration Building, Library and Exhibition in Poznan, Poland
- 1959: U.S. Administration Building, Library and Exhibition Hall [Salonika, Greece]
- 1960: River Edge, NJ, Public Library [River Edge, NJ]
- 1963: Hawaiian Pavilion, New York World's Fair, Flushing Meadow, NY
- 1963: River Edge Reform Temple and School, River Edge, New Jersey
- 1965: Paramus Public Library, Paramus, New Jersey in the Book of the Month Club.
- 1968: Immanuel Lutheran Church School, Whitestone, New York
- 1969: Embassy of Finland to the UN, New York City
- 1969: Lincoln Park Public Library, Lincoln Park, New Jersey
