= 213th Combat Aviation Company =

- Active: 1941-1972
- Country: United States
- Branch: United States Army

The 213th Combat Aviation Company is an inactive United States Army aviation unit.

== History ==
The company was constituted as Company E, 34th Quartermaster Regiment on 21 February 1941, and was activated on 6 March 1941. The company participated in the New Guinea, Leyte, and Southern Philippine Campaigns during WWII, and was then deactivated on 17 June 1946. The company was then designated as the 2013th Transportation Corps Truck Company on 1 August 1946. On 23 March 1966, it was redesignated as the 213th Aviation Company in Ft. Benning, Georgia, and was then reactivated on 1 June 1966. The 329th Transportation Corps Detachment was then inactivated and integrated into the 213th Combat Aviation Company on 28 January 1969.

After extensive training on the CH-47 "Chinook", the 213th was then deployed to Vietnam with the first cargo aircraft arriving on Phu Loi on 25 January 1967, the second cargo and the first troop aircraft arriving on 26 January 1967, and the last lift of the cargo aircraft as well as the second troop aircraft arriving on 27 January 1967.

On 29 January 1967, the 213th, alongside the 329th Transportation Company, was assigned to the 11th Combat Aviation Battalion under the 12th Combat Aviation Group, and the 213th was initially given the callsign "Stagecoach". During Operation Junction City on 22 February 1967, the 213th's mission was to assist the 1st Infantry Division. At the end of the operation, its callsign changed to and officially became "Black Cats".

During its campaign in the Vietnam War, the 213th earned the Meritorious Unit Citation and two Vietnamese Cross of Gallantry.

The unit was later deactivated on 15 February 1972.

== Lineage ==
- Constituted as Company E, 34th Quartermaster Regiment
- Activated on 6 March 1941
- Deactivated on 17 June 1946
- Designated as the 2013th Transportation Corps Truck Company on 1 August 1946
- Re-designated as the 213th Aviation Company and activated in Fort Benning on 1 June 1966
- Deactivated on 15 February 1972

== Notable members ==
- Marie Rossi
