= Frank Capsouras =

American weightlifter (born 1947)

Personal information
- Nationality: American
- Born: January 29, 1947 (age 79) Hackensack, New Jersey, United States

Sport
- Sport: Weightlifting

Frank Capsouras (born January 29, 1947) is an American weightlifter. He competed in the men's heavyweight event at the 1972 Summer Olympics.

Capsouras was a resident of River Edge, New Jersey. Capsouras won the national teen title at the age of 17, having started lifting at age 12. He attended River Dell Regional High School, where he was a competitive wrestler.
