= Scot D. Ryersson =

American artist

Scot D. Ryersson (September 10, 1960 in Suffern, New York — May 4, 2024 in River Edge, New Jersey) was an illustrator, graphic artist and writer. In addition to many critiques and essays on film and literature, he was the co-author of the biography Infinite Variety: The Life and Legend of the Marchesa Casati, as well as The Marchesa Casati: Portraits of a Muse.

Ryersson was co-director of The Casati Archives, devoted to preserving the artistic and cultural legacy of Luisa Casati. It was founded by Ryersson and Michael Orlando Yaccarino in 1999 upon the original publication of Infinite Variety. In addition to original materials, books and ephemera, this library contains artwork reproductions and photographs of and inspired by Marchesa Casati.

Trained at London's Chelsea School of Art and Design, for many years Ryersson was a motion picture poster designer in the United States, Canada and Europe. Credits include advertising campaigns for The Silence of the Lambs (1991), Ghost (1990) and Witness (1985), The Changeling (1980), Children of the Corn (1984), Working Girl (1988), She Devil (1989), Pet Sematary (1989) and Presumed Innocent (1990). Ryersson was presented with two Art Directors of London Awards for his poster designs for the British films Evil Under the Sun (1982) and Another Country (1984). The concept poster design for The Silence of the Lambs was voted fifth place of the "Fifty Greatest Film Posters of All Time" by Britain's Empire magazine, while earning sixteenth place for the same accolade by the US publication Premiere in their August 2001 issue.

== Bibliography ==
=== Books ===
- Ryersson, Scot D.; Michael Orlando Yaccarino (November 1999). Infinite Variety: The Life and Legend of the Marchesa Casati. New York: Viridian Books. ISBN 0-9670527-2-6.
- Ryersson, Scot D.; Michael Orlando Yaccarino (October 2000). Infinite Variety: The Life and Legend of the Marchesa Casati. London: Pimlico/Random House. ISBN 0-7126-6751-2.
- Ryersson, Scot D.; Michael Orlando Yaccarino (January 2003). La Casati: Les multiples vies de la marquise Luisa Casati. Paris: Éditions Assouline. ISBN 2-84323-388-7.
- Ryersson, Scot D.; Michael Orlando Yaccarino (February 2003). Infinita Varietà: Vita e leggenda della Marchesa Casati. Milan: Corbaccio. ISBN 978-88-7972-543-9.
- Ryersson, Scot D.; Michael Orlando Yaccarino (April 2003). The Princess of Wax-A Cruel Tale (La Princesse de cire — Un Conte cruel). New York: CFM. ISBN 0-9728620-4-8.
- Ryersson, Scot D.; Michael Orlando Yaccarino (August 2006). Die göttliche Marchesa: Leben und Legende der Luisa Casati. Innsbruck: Haymon Verlag. ISBN 3-85218-517-3.
- Ryersson, Scot D.; Michael Orlando Yaccarino (September 2004). Infinite Variety: The Life and Legend of the Marchesa Casati (Definitive ed.). Minneapolis: University of Minnesota Press. ISBN 0-8166-4520-5.
- Ryersson, Scot D.; Michael Orlando Yaccarino (December 2006). Неистовая маркиза: жизнь и легенда Луизы Казати. Moscow: Slovo. ISBN 5-85050-895-3.
- Ryersson, Scot D.; Michael Orlando Yaccarino (March 2009). Die göttliche Marchesa: Leben und Legende der Luisa Casati - paperback. Munich: Btb - Random House. ISBN 978-3-442-73742-0.
- Ryersson, Scot D.; Michael Orlando Yaccarino (October 2009). The Marchesa Casati: Portraits of a Muse. New York: Abrams. ISBN 978-0-8109-4815-0.
- Ryersson, Scot D. (June 2010). Poisoned Ivy. Portland, ME: Bristlecone Pine Press. ISBN 978-1-60722-020-6.
- Ryersson, Scot D. (April 2011). The Arsenic Flower. Portland, ME: Bristlecone Pine Press. ISBN 978-1-60722-027-5.
- Ryersson, Scot D. (August 2011). Summer's Lease. Portland, ME: Bristlecone Pine Press. ISBN 978-1-60722-028-2.
- Ryersson, Scot D. (January 2012). Mad, Bad, and Dangerous to Know. Portland, ME: Bristlecone Pine Press. ISBN 978-1-60722-031-2.
- Ryersson, Scot D.; Michael Orlando Yaccarino (October 2017). Infinite Variety: The Life and Legend of the Marchesa Casati (Ultimate ed.). Minneapolis: University of Minnesota Press. ISBN 978-1-5179-0371-8.

=== Articles co-written with Michael Orlando Yaccarino ===
- Painted Lady-The Marchesa Casati; Bizarre (UK): 2000.
- Medusa in Pearls-The Marchesa Casati; aRUDE (U.S.A.): 2001.
- Passion Player-Gabriele D'Annunzio; aRUDE (U.S.A.): 2001.
- The Dandy Boys; Bizarre (UK): 2001.
- Daydream Believer-The Marchesa Casati; The Idler (UK): 2002.
- Haute Bizarre-Couturier Claudia Scarsella; Art-is-Life (U.S.A.): 2002.
- Siren of the Century-The Marchesa Casati, Art-is-Life (U.S.A.): 2002.
- Aesthetic Assassin-Comte Robert de Montesquiou; Art-is-Life (U.S.A.): 2004.
- Life on the High Seas of Culture-Nancy Cunard; Art-is-Life (U.S.A.): 2004.
- Luisa and Gabriele; Primo (Belgium): 2005.
- The Temptations of St. Jean; aRUDE (U.S.A.): 2005.

=== Theatrical works ===
- Ryersson, Scot D.; Michael Orlando Yaccarino (2004). Infinite Variety: Portrait of a Muse (Revised).

=== Misc ===
- Ryersson, Scot D.; Michael Orlando Yaccarino (2004). Foreword to: Black Pearls: Drawings of the Marchesa Luisa Casati by Joanne Burke. UK.
- Fire and Ice: The Life and Films of Brigitte Helm; Filmfax (U.S.A.): No. 84, April/May 2001.

== Literary awards ==
All are for Infinite Variety: The Life and Legend of the Marchesa Casati (various editions)

- What We Love Selection, October 2006, Deutsch Vogue (Germany)
- Best Books Winter 2004/2005, Elegant Lifestyle (U.S.A./UK./Germany)
- Banner Books of the Year, 2004, Pointe Magazine, (U.S.A.)
- Top Ten Most Read Books, 2003, Academia News (Italy)
- Book of the Week Selection, March 3–9, 2003 La Repubblica (Italy)
- Biography of the Year 2000, First Finalist, Independent Publisher Book Awards (U.S.A.)
- Bestseller List – ‘Books Everyone Likes,’ 2000, Lambda Literary Foundation (U.S.A.)
- Paperback of the Week Selection, October 2–8, 2000, Time Out London (UK)
- Certificate of Merit in Biographical Writing, 2000, Writer’s Digest (U.S.A.)
- Book of the Year Selection, 1999, Bibel (Sweden)
- Book of the Year Selection, 1999, Gay Times (UK)
- Book of the Year Selection, 1999, Sunday Telegraph (UK)
