= River Edge, New Jersey =

Borough in Bergen County, New Jersey, US

- Borough
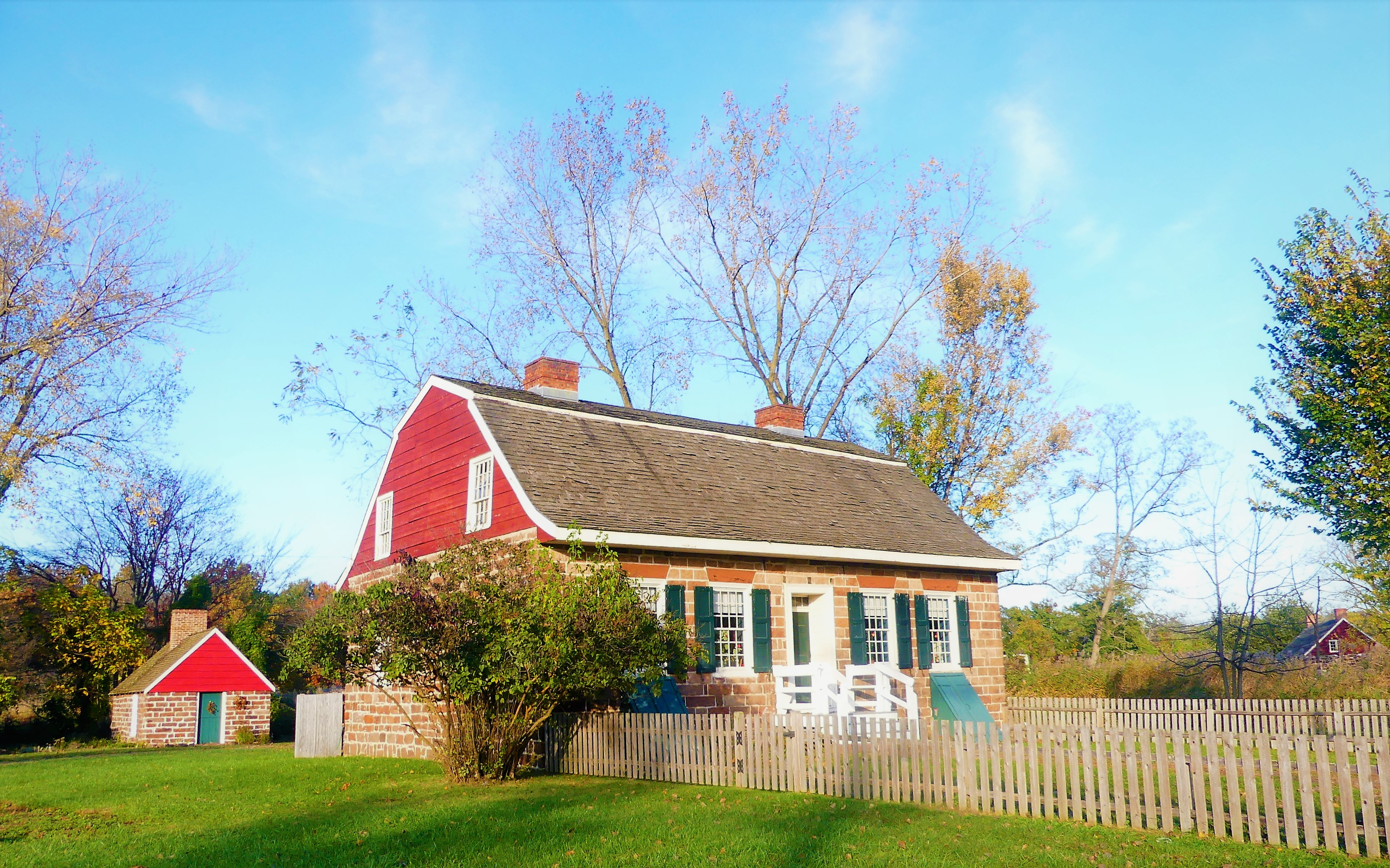
- Campbell-Christie House

- Seal

- Location of River Edge in Bergen County highlighted in red (left). Inset map: Location of Bergen County in New Jersey highlighted in orange (right).

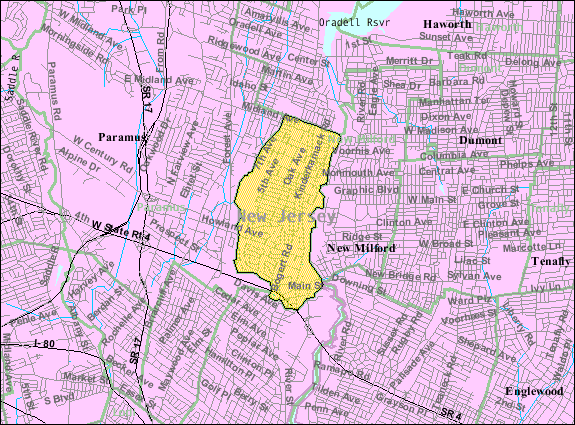
- Census Bureau map of River Edge, New Jersey

- Location in Bergen County Location in New Jersey Location in the United States
- Coordinates: 40.926766°N 74.037468°W
- Country: United States
- State: New Jersey
- County: Bergen
- Incorporated: June 30, 1894

Government
  - Type: Borough
  - Body: Borough Council
  - Mayor: Thomas R. Papaleo (D, term ends December 31, 2027)
  - Administrator: Lisette Aportela
  - Municipal clerk: Anne Dodd

Area
  - Total: 1.88 sq mi (4.86 km^{2})
  - Land: 1.83 sq mi (4.75 km^{2})
  - Water: 0.046 sq mi (0.12 km^{2}) 2.39%
  - Rank: 422nd of 565 in state 52nd of 70 in county
- Elevation: 49 ft (15 m)

Population (2020)
  - Total: 12,049
  - Estimate (2023): 11,995
  - Rank: 210th of 565 in state 30th of 70 in county
  - Density: 6,573.4/sq mi (2,538.0/km^{2})
  - Rank: 78th of 565 in state 24th of 70 in county
- Time zone: UTC−05:00 (Eastern (EST))
  - Summer (DST): UTC−04:00 (Eastern (EDT))
- ZIP Code: 07661
- Area code: 201
- FIPS code: 3400363360
- GNIS feature ID: 0885372
- Website: www.riveredgenj.org

River Edge is a borough in Bergen County, in the U.S. state of New Jersey. As of the 2020 United States census, the borough's population was 12,049, an increase of 709 (+6.3%) from the 2010 census count of 11,340, which in turn reflected an increase of 394 (+3.6%) from the 10,946 counted in the 2000 census.

The community was originally incorporated as the borough of Riverside by an act of the New Jersey Legislature on June 30, 1894, from portions of Midland Township, based on the results of a referendum held the previous day. On December 1, 1930, the borough's name was changed to River Edge. The borough was formed during the "Boroughitis" phenomenon then sweeping through Bergen County, in which 26 boroughs were formed in the county in 1894 alone. The borough was named for its location along the Hackensack River.

== Geography ==
According to the United States Census Bureau, the borough had a total area of 1.88 square miles (4.86 km^{2}), including 1.83 square miles (4.75 km^{2}) of land and 0.05 square miles (0.12 km^{2}) of water (2.39%).

A suburb of New York City, River Edge is located approximately 8 miles (13 km) west of Upper Manhattan.

Cherry Hill and North Hackensack are unincorporated communities located within River Edge.

The borough is bordered by the Bergen County municipalities of Hackensack, New Milford, Oradell, Paramus and Teaneck.

== Demographics ==
Historical population
Census	Pop.	Note	%±
1900	561		—
1910	736		31.2%
1920	1,077		46.3%
1930	2,210		105.2%
1940	3,287		48.7%
1950	9,204		180.0%
1960	13,264		44.1%
1970	12,850		−3.1%
1980	11,111		−13.5%
1990	10,603		−4.6%
2000	10,946		3.2%
2010	11,340		3.6%
2020	12,049		6.3%
2023 (est.)	11,995	▼	−0.4%
Population sources: 1900–1920 1900–1910; 1910–1930 1900–2020; 2000 2010 2020

=== Racial and ethnic composition ===
River Edge borough, New Jersey – Racial and ethnic composition Note: the US Census treats Hispanic/Latino as an ethnic category. This table excludes Latinos from the racial categories and assigns them to a separate category. Hispanics/Latinos may be of any race.
Race / Ethnicity (NH = Non-Hispanic)	Pop 2000	Pop 2010	Pop 2020	% 2000	% 2010	% 2020
White alone (NH)	8,758	7,669	6,649	80.01%	67.63%	55.18%
Black or African American alone (NH)	108	156	283	0.99%	1.38%	2.35%
Native American or Alaska Native alone (NH)	8	5	8	0.07%	0.04%	0.07%
Asian alone (NH)	1,378	2,505	3,434	12.59%	22.09%	28.50%
Pacific Islander alone (NH)	0	9	0	0.00%	0.08%	0.00%
Other race alone (NH)	10	10	50	0.09%	0.09%	0.41%
Mixed race or Multiracial (NH)	103	117	286	0.94%	1.03%	2.37%
Hispanic or Latino (any race)	581	869	1,339	5.31%	7.66%	11.11%
Total	10,946	11,340	12,049	100.00%	100.00%	100.00%

=== 2020 census ===
As of the 2020 census, River Edge had a population of 12,049. The median age was 41.3 years. 24.8% of residents were under the age of 18 and 15.1% of residents were 65 years of age or older. For every 100 females there were 94.4 males, and for every 100 females age 18 and over there were 91.2 males age 18 and over.

100.0% of residents lived in urban areas, while 0.0% lived in rural areas.

There were 4,191 households in River Edge, of which 41.8% had children under the age of 18 living in them. Of all households, 66.7% were married-couple households, 10.2% were households with a male householder and no spouse or partner present, and 20.3% were households with a female householder and no spouse or partner present. About 17.5% of all households were made up of individuals and 9.3% had someone living alone who was 65 years of age or older.

There were 4,337 housing units, of which 3.4% were vacant. The homeowner vacancy rate was 1.0% and the rental vacancy rate was 2.9%.

=== 2010 census ===
The 2010 United States census counted 11,340 people, 4,134 households, and 3,163 families in the borough. The population density was 6,116.3 per square mile (2,361.5/km^{2}). There were 4,261 housing units at an average density of 2,298.2 per square mile (887.3/km^{2}). The racial makeup was 73.42% (8,326) White, 1.52% (172) Black or African American, 0.05% (6) Native American, 22.19% (2,516) Asian, 0.08% (9) Pacific Islander, 1.25% (142) from other races, and 1.49% (169) from two or more races. Hispanic or Latino of any race were 7.66% (869) of the population. Korean Americans accounted for 11.1% of the borough's population.

Of the 4,134 households, 38.8% had children under the age of 18; 64.8% were married couples living together; 8.9% had a female householder with no husband present and 23.5% were non-families. Of all households, 20.6% were made up of individuals and 10.7% had someone living alone who was 65 years of age or older. The average household size was 2.74 and the average family size was 3.21.

26.0% of the population were under the age of 18, 5.9% from 18 to 24, 24.7% from 25 to 44, 29.7% from 45 to 64, and 13.8% who were 65 years of age or older. The median age was 41.4 years. For every 100 females, the population had 92.8 males. For every 100 females ages 18 and older there were 88.4 males.

The Census Bureau's 2006–2010 American Community Survey showed that (in 2010 inflation-adjusted dollars) median household income was $97,816 (with a margin of error of +/− $7,136) and the median family income was $109,335 (+/− $12,278). Males had a median income of $71,219 (+/− $6,936) versus $63,305 (+/− $12,071) for females. The per capita income for the borough was $38,772 (+/− $2,392). About 3.0% of families and 4.2% of the population were below the poverty line, including 5.0% of those under age 18 and 4.2% of those age 65 or over.

Same-sex couples headed 19 households in 2010, a decrease from the 24 counted in 2000.

=== 2000 census ===
As of the 2000 United States census there were 10,946 people, 4,165 households, and 3,102 families residing in the borough. The population density was 5,804.5 inhabitants per square mile (2,241.1/km^{2}). There were 4,210 housing units at an average density of 2,232.5 per square mile (862.0/km^{2}). The racial makeup of the borough was 84.12% White, 1.06% African American, 0.08% American Indian, 12.60% Asian, 0.01% Pacific Islander, 0.81% from other races, and 1.32% from two or more races. Hispanic or Latino of any race were 5.31% of the population.

There were 4,165 households, out of which 35.0% had children under the age of 18 living with them, 64.4% were married couples living together, 7.6% had a female householder with no husband present, and 25.5% were non-families. 22.7% of all households were made up of individuals, and 11.5% had someone living alone who was 65 years of age or older. The average household size was 2.62 and the average family size was 3.11.

In the borough the population was spread out, with 24.1% under the age of 18, 5.0% from 18 to 24, 30.2% from 25 to 44, 23.8% from 45 to 64, and 17.0% who were 65 years of age or older. The median age was 40 years. For every 100 females, there were 90.9 males. For every 100 females age 18 and over, there were 86.7 males.

The median income for a household in the borough was $71,792, and the median income for a family was $80,422. Males had a median income of $62,044 versus $41,085 for females. The per capita income for the borough was $33,188. About 2.5% of families and 3.1% of the population were below the poverty line, including 3.5% of those under age 18 and 2.6% of those age 65 or over.

== Government ==
=== Local government ===
River Edge is governed under the borough form of New Jersey municipal government, which is used in 218 municipalities (of the 564) statewide, making it the most common form of government in New Jersey. The governing body is comprised of a mayor and a borough council, with all positions elected at-large on a partisan basis as part of the November general election. A mayor is elected directly by the voters to a four-year term of office. The borough council includes six members elected to serve three-year terms on a staggered basis, with two seats coming up for election each year in a three-year cycle. The borough form of government used by River Edge is a "weak mayor / strong council" government in which council members act as the legislative body with the mayor presiding at meetings and voting only in the event of a tie. The mayor can veto ordinances subject to an override by a two-thirds majority vote of the council. The mayor makes committee and liaison assignments for council members, and most appointments are made by the mayor with the advice and consent of the council.

As of 2025, the mayor of the Borough of River Edge is Democrat Thomas R. Papaleo, whose term of office ends December 31, 2027. The members of the Borough Council are Council President Lissa Montisano-Koen (D, 2025), Barry Benson (D, 2025), Priti Dhariwal (D, 2027), David Glass (D, 2026), Indira Kinsella (D, 2026) and Klodiana Malellari (D, 2027).

In January 2020, the borough council selected Indira Kinsella from three candidates nominated by the Democratic municipal committee to fill the seat expiring in December 2020 that had been held by Thomas Papaleo until he resigned to take office as mayor.

In February 2016, the borough council selected Mary Davis from a list of three candidates nominated by the Republican municipal committee to fill the seat expiring in December 2016 that was vacated by Edward Mignone when he took office as mayor.

In October 2015, council member Anthony Cappola resigned from office and left the race for an Assembly seat in the 38th Legislative District, following disclosures that he had written and published a 2003 book titled Outrageous that was described as "full of racial slurs, rants and stereotypes".

==== List of mayors ====
#	Mayor	Term start	Term end	Party	Elections won	Notes
1	John G. Webb	1894	1897	Republican		Webb was the first mayor of River Edge following incorporation.
2	Joseph A. Brohel	1897	1899	Republican		Resigned in August 1899.
3	David A. Zabriskie	1899	1900	Republican		Acting mayor following Brohel's resignation.
4	Louis L. Rolland	1900	1903	Republican		Resigned in November 1903
5	Henry Lozier	1903	1904	Republican	N/A	Acting mayor following Rolland's resignation. Did not seek election to a full term.
6	Joseph A. Brohel	1904	1912	Republican	1903, 1905, 1907, 1909, 1911	Only Mayor to serve non-consecutive terms. Resigned in January 1912.
7	Albert Z. Bogert	1912	1930	Republican	1912 (special), 1913, 1915, 1917, 1919, 1921, 1923, 1925, 1927	Acting mayor following Brohel's resignation. Selected to fill balance of the term. Did not seek reelection to a ninth full term.
8	Elmer F. Howell	1930	1931	Republican	1929	Resigned in February 1931. Name of the Borough changed from Riverside to River Edge during his tenure.
9	J. Pell Zabriskie	1931	1938	Republican	1931, 1933, 1935	Acting mayor following Howell's resignation. Selected to fill balance of the term. Did not seek reelection to a third full term.
10	Martin J. Ferber	1938	1948	Republican	1937, 1939, 1941, 1943, 1945	Also elected Bergen County Freeholder in 1943. Did not seek reelection to a sixth term.
11	James Farrell	1948	1956	Republican	1947, 1949, 1951, 1953	Did not seek reelection to a fifth term.
12	F. Walton Wanner	1956	1962	Republican	1955, 1957, 1959	Retired to run for General Assembly.
13	Kenneth B. George	1962	1965	Republican	1961, 1963	Died in February 1965.
14	Karl C. Christiansen	1965	1972	Republican	1965, 1967, 1969	Acting mayor following George's death. Selected to fill balance of the term. Did not seek reelection to a fourth full term.
15	John Curran	1972	1978	Democratic	1971, 1975	First Democratic mayor. First mayor elected to a four-year term. Resigned upon election to the Bergen County Board of Chosen Freeholders in December 1978.
16	William Doyle	1978	1984	Democratic	1979	Acting mayor following Curran's resignation. Selected to fill balance of the term. Lost reelection to a second full term.
17	Edward P. Raffo	1984	1988	Republican	1983	Lost reelection to a second term.
18	Robert Graillat	1988	1988	Democratic	1987	Resigned in December 1988.
19	Kevin Rigby	1988	1992	Democratic	1989 (special)	Acting mayor following Graillat's resignation. Selected to fill balance of the term. Did not seek reelection to a full term.
20	James T. Kirk	1992	2000	Democratic	1991, 1995	Lost reelection to a third term.
21	Margaret Falahee Watkins	2000	2012	Republican	1999, 2003, 2007	First female mayor of River Edge. Lost reelection to a fourth term.
22	Sandy Moscaritolo	2012	2016	Democratic	2011	Lost reelection to a second term.
23	Edward Mignone	2016	2019	Republican	2015	Resigned in August 2019.
24	Ellen Busteed	2019	2020	Democratic	N/A	Acting mayor following Mignone's resignation. Did not seek election to a full term.
25	Thomas R. Papaleo	2020	Incumbent	Democratic	2019	Papaleo is the current mayor of River Edge.

=== Federal, state and county representation ===
River Edge is located in the 5th Congressional District and is part of New Jersey's 38th state legislative district.

For the 119th United States Congress, New Jersey's 5th congressional district is represented by Josh Gottheimer (D, Wyckoff). New Jersey is represented in the United States Senate by Democrats Cory Booker (Newark, term ends 2027) and Andy Kim (Moorestown, term ends 2031).

For the 2026–2027 session, the 38th legislative district of the New Jersey Legislature is represented in the State Senate by Joseph Lagana (D, Paramus) and in the General Assembly by Lisa Swain (D, Fair Lawn) and Chris Tully (D, Bergenfield).

Bergen County is governed by a directly elected County Executive, with legislative functions performed by a Board of County Commissioners comprised of seven members who are elected at-large to three-year terms in partisan elections on a staggered basis, with either two or three seats coming up for election each November; a Chairman and Vice Chairman are selected from among its seven members at a reorganization meeting held every January. As of 2025, the county executive is James J. Tedesco III (D, Paramus), whose four-year term of office ends December 31, 2026.

Bergen County's Commissioners are Chair Mary J. Amoroso (D, Mahwah, 2025), Vice Chair Steven A. Tanelli (D, North Arlington, 2027), Chair Pro Tem Joan Voss (D, Fort Lee, 2026), Rafael Marte (D, Bergenfield, 2026), Germaine M. Ortiz (D, Emerson, 2025), Thomas J. Sullivan Jr. (D, Montvale, 2025) and Tracy Silna Zur (D, Franklin Lakes, 2027).

Bergen County's elected constitutional officials are Clerk John S. Hogan (D, Northvale, 2026), Sheriff Anthony Cureton (D, Englewood, 2027) and Surrogate Michael R. Dressler (D, Cresskill, 2026).

=== Politics ===
United States presidential election results for River Edge 2024 2020 2016 2012 2008 2004
Year	Republican		Democratic		Third party(ies)	
Year	No.	%	No.	%	No.	%
2024	2,539	41.50%	3,459	56.54%	120	1.96%
2020	2,441	37.05%	4,068	61.75%	79	1.20%
2016	2,276	40.84%	3,107	55.75%	190	3.41%
2012	2,337	45.66%	2,723	53.20%	58	1.13%
2008	2,577	46.12%	2,965	53.07%	45	0.81%
2004	2,790	49.45%	2,821	50.00%	31	0.55%

As of March 2011, there were a total of 6,776 registered voters in River Edge, of which 1,961 (28.9% vs. 31.7% countywide) were registered as Democrats, 1,329 (19.6% vs. 21.1%) were registered as Republicans and 3,485 (51.4% vs. 47.1%) were registered as Unaffiliated. There was one voter registered to another party. Among the borough's 2010 Census population, 59.8% (vs. 57.1% in Bergen County) were registered to vote, including 80.7% of those ages 18 and over (vs. 73.7% countywide).

Gubernatorial election results for River Edge
Year	Republican		Democratic		Third party(ies)	
Year	No.	%	No.	%	No.	%
2025	1,813	38.58%	2,868	61.03%	18	0.38%
2021	1,632	42.48%	2,189	56.98%	21	0.55%
2017	1,159	39.80%	1,718	59.00%	35	1.20%
2013	2,007	58.31%	1,400	40.67%	35	1.02%
2009	1,714	46.87%	1,702	46.54%	241	6.59%
2005	1,575	43.93%	1,923	53.64%	87	2.43%

In the 2016 presidential election, Democrat Hillary Clinton received 3,107 votes (55.3% vs. 54.2% countywide), ahead of Republican Donald Trump with 5,618 votes (40.5% vs. 41.1%) and other candidates with 235 votes (4.2% vs. 4.6%), among the 5,690 ballots cast by the borough's 7,477 registered voters, for a turnout of 76.1% (vs. 72.5% in Bergen County). In the 2012 presidential election, Democrat Barack Obama received 2,723 votes here (53.0% vs. 54.8% countywide), ahead of Republican Mitt Romney with 2,337 votes (45.5% vs. 43.5%) and other candidates with 58 votes (1.1% vs. 0.9%), among the 5,134 ballots cast by the borough's 7,065 registered voters, for a turnout of 72.7% (vs. 70.4% in Bergen County). In the 2008 presidential election, Democrat Barack Obama received 2,965 votes here (52.6% vs. 53.9% countywide), ahead of Republican John McCain with 2,577 votes (45.7% vs. 44.5%) and other candidates with 45 votes (0.8% vs. 0.8%), among the 5,633 ballots cast by the borough's 7,100 registered voters, for a turnout of 79.3% (vs. 76.8% in Bergen County).

In the 2013 gubernatorial election, Republican Chris Christie received 58.3% of the vote (2,007 cast), ahead of Democrat Barbara Buono with 40.7% (1,400 votes), and other candidates with 1.0% (35 votes), among the 3,522 ballots cast by the borough's 6,801 registered voters (80 ballots were spoiled), for a turnout of 51.8%. In the 2009 gubernatorial election, Republican Chris Christie received 1,714 votes here (46.2% vs. 45.8% countywide), ahead of Democrat Jon Corzine with 1,702 votes (45.9% vs. 48.0%), Independent Chris Daggett with 230 votes (6.2% vs. 4.7%) and other candidates with 11 votes (0.3% vs. 0.5%), among the 3,707 ballots cast by the borough's 6,921 registered voters, yielding a 53.6% turnout (vs. 50.0% in the county).

United States Senate election results for River Edge1
Year	Republican		Democratic		Third party(ies)	
Year	No.	%	No.	%	No.	%
2024	2,263	39.08%	3,416	59.00%	111	1.92%
2018	1,787	44.81%	2,084	52.26%	117	2.93%
2012	2,052	43.15%	2,631	55.32%	73	1.53%
2006	1,759	47.17%	1,910	51.22%	60	1.61%

United States Senate election results for River Edge2
Year	Republican		Democratic		Third party(ies)	
Year	No.	%	No.	%	No.	%
2020	2,413	37.45%	3,939	61.13%	92	1.43%
2014	1,249	41.06%	1,746	57.40%	47	1.55%
2013	879	42.90%	1,163	56.76%	7	0.34%
2008	2,354	45.58%	2,755	53.35%	55	1.07%

== Education ==
The River Edge Elementary School District served students in pre-kindergarten through sixth grade. As of the 2022–23 school year, the district, comprised of two schools, had an enrollment of 1,189 students and 101.0 classroom teachers (on an FTE basis), for a student–teacher ratio of 11.8:1. Schools in the district (with 2022–23 enrollment data from the National Center for Education Statistics) are Cherry Hill School / New Bridge Center (with 713 students in grades PreK-6) which is on the south side of the borough and Roosevelt School (with 478 students in grades 1-6) which is located on the north side of the borough.

River Edge and neighboring Oradell share a combined public school district for seventh through twelfth grades, River Dell Regional School District which was established in 1958. As of the 2022–23 school year, the high school district, comprised of two schools, had an enrollment of 1,613 students and 138.4 classroom teachers (on an FTE basis), for a student–teacher ratio of 11.7:1. Schools in the district (with 2022–23 enrollment data from the National Center for Education Statistics) are River Dell Regional Middle School in River Edge (with 589 students in grades 7-8) and River Dell High School in Oradell (with 982 students in grades 9-12). Seats on the regional school district's nine-member board of education are allocated based on the population of the constituent municipalities, with five seats assigned to River Edge.

Public school students from the borough, and all of Bergen County, are eligible to attend the secondary education programs offered by the Bergen County Technical Schools, which include the Bergen County Academies in Hackensack, and the Bergen Tech campus in Teterboro or Paramus. The district offers programs on a shared-time or full-time basis, with admission based on a selective application process and tuition covered by the student's home school district.

St. Peter Academy is a K–8 Catholic school that operates under the auspices of the Roman Catholic Archdiocese of Newark. The school was one of eight private schools recognized in 2017 as an Exemplary High Performing School by the National Blue Ribbon Schools Program of the United States Department of Education.

The Rosenbaum Yeshiva of North Jersey, which served 1,040 students in nursery through eighth grade as of the start of the September 2013 school year, was founded as the Yeshiva of Hudson County, and was re-established in Bergen County in 1979.

== Transportation ==
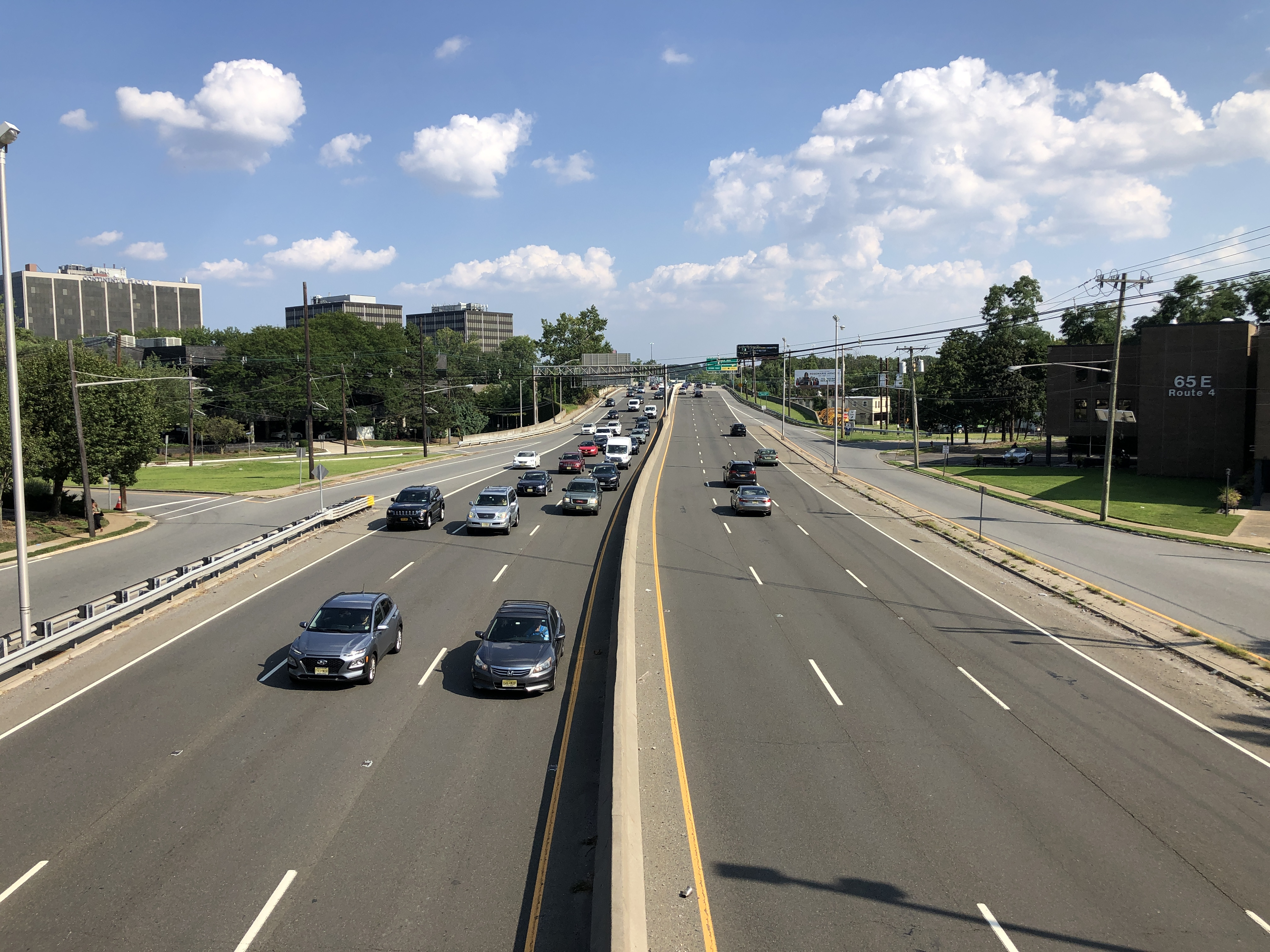
Route 4 eastbound in River Edge

=== Roads and highways ===
As of May 2010, the borough had a total of 33.73 miles (54.28 km) of roadways, of which 29.50 miles (47.48 km) were maintained by the municipality, 3.85 miles (6.20 km) by Bergen County and 0.38 miles (0.61 km) by the New Jersey Department of Transportation.

Route 4 is the primary highway serving River Edge, running along the borough's southern edge. County Route 503 (Kinderkamack Road) passes north-south through the borough, alongside the Hackensack River. In January 2025, the New Jersey Department of Transportation announced the commencement of the Route 4 Hackensack River Bridge Replacement Project. While the bridge is just outside the borough in neighboring Teaneck and Hackensack, the project aims to improve both the transportation infrastructure and safety for commuters in the River Edge area."

=== Public transportation ===
River Edge has two train stations in the borough, at River Edge (at River Edge Road on the north end of the borough) and New Bridge Landing (at Grand Avenue on the south end of the borough). These stations provide service on NJ Transit's Pascack Valley Line, which runs north–south to Hoboken Terminal with connections via the Secaucus Junction transfer station to New York Penn Station and to other NJ Transit rail service. Connections are available at Hoboken Terminal to other NJ Transit rail lines, Hudson-Bergen Light Rail, PATH trains and NY Waterway ferry service to the World Financial Center and other destinations.

There are parking lots at both the River Edge and New Bridge Landing stations that are available for River Edge residents. Permits are required to use the lots and can be obtained from the borough.

NJ Transit offers bus service to and from the Port Authority Bus Terminal in Midtown Manhattan on the 165 route and local service on the 756 and 762 routes.

The 11T/11AT route of Rockland Coaches also serves the Port Authority Bus Terminal, as well as providing service to Rockland County, New York.

== Points of interest ==
New Bridge Landing is the site of The Bridge That Saved A Nation crossed by the Continental Army and General Washington as they retreated from the British attack on New York City on November 20, 1776.

- Campbell-Christie House is a historic home constructed in April 1774 in what was then Hackensack Township on the east side of the Hackensack River that was moved in its entirety in 1977 from New Milford
- Steuben House was used by George Washington as his headquarters for 16 days in September 1780.
- Demarest House is a historic house near the Van Steuben and Campbell Christie house. It is known for its stove chimney which was a technological advance at the time it was built in 1794. It was originally in New Milford, but then moved to River Edge. It was renovated in 2009 and is open to the public as a museum.

== Parks and recreation ==
Parks in River Edge include:

- Van Saun County Park covers 146 acres (59 ha) in River Edge and Paramus. While the train ride, zoo, carousel, and pony rides are on the Paramus side of the park, the playground, dog park, baseball fields, some walking paths, and Walden Pond are on the River Edge side.
- Veterans Memorial Park – located on Continental Avenue that has a playground, a picnic area, a ball court/roller hockey rink, and a baseball field.
- Brookside Park – located on Greenway Terrace that has a walking path, playground, and a basketball court.
- River Edge Bird Sanctuary and Nature Trail – located on the River Edge/Paramus border, this park has a bird sanctuary and a walking nature trail. It is located behind The Shoppes on IV shopping center in Paramus.
- River Edge Arboretum – located on Elm Avenue next to the River Edge Public Library that has a walking path and tennis courts.
- Cherry Blossom Park – located on Bogert Road next to Cherry Hill Elementary School. It features a variety of flowers and plantings with a walking path and seating areas.
- Kiddie Wonderland was a children's amusement park that operated from 1951 to 1958. It featured rides such as a train ride, carousel, and a small roller coaster. It was located at the end of Main Street where the Hackensack River intersects with Coles Brook. It was later converted into apartments.

== Notable people ==
People who were born in, residents of, or otherwise closely associated with River Edge include:

- Reino Aarnio (1912–1988), architect
- Joanna Angel (born 1980), alternative pornographic and mainstream actress, director, and writer of adult films
- Bonnie August (1947–2003), fashion designer who innovated the disco-era look of unitards under wrap skirts
- Robert O. Becker (1923–2008), orthopedic surgeon and researcher in electrophysiology/electromedicine who co-authored The Body Electric: Electromagnetism and the Foundation of Life
- Frank Capsouras (born 1947), weightlifter who represented the United States in the men's heavyweight event at the 1972 Summer Olympics
- Charley Casserly (born 1949), former General Manager of the Washington Redskins
- J. Walter Christie (1865–1944), tank pioneer
- John Donovan (born 1974), college football coach who has been the offensive coordinator for the Vanderbilt Commodores football program
- Paul J. Fishman (born 1957), United States Attorney for the District of New Jersey
- Louise Gonnerman (born 1947), former professional tennis player.
- Freddie Hoffman (c. 1959), bicyclist who has ridden more than one million miles on his bicycle
- Harry and Patricia Kislevitz, creators of Colorforms, the 'stick-on' vinyl shapes toy
- Lucile Lawrence (1907–2004), harpist
- Jack Lazorko (born 1956), former pitcher who played for the Milwaukee Brewers, Seattle Mariners, and the California Angels
- Mickey Mantle (1931–1995), former baseball player for the New York Yankees, member of the National Baseball Hall of Fame
- Charles Mayo (1884–1977), English-American professional golfer
- Lee Meredith (born 1947), actress who played the role of Ulla in the 1968 screen version of The Producers
- Billy Paultz (born 1948), former ABA and NBA basketball player, nicknamed "The Whopper"
- Gene Roddenberry (1921–1991), television screenwriter, producer and creator of Star Trek: The Original Series
- Scot D. Ryersson (born 1960), illustrator, graphic artist and writer
- Teata Semiz (1934–2021), bowler who was inducted into the Professional Bowlers Association Hall of Fame in 1991
- Ali Shayegan (1903–1981), opponent of Shah Mohammad Reza Pahlavi who lived in political exile in the United States from 1958
- Ellen Zavian (born 1963), sports agent and attorney who was the National Football League's first female attorney-agent

== Sources ==
- Municipal Incorporations of the State of New Jersey (according to Counties) prepared by the Division of Local Government, Department of the Treasury (New Jersey); December 1, 1958.
- Clayton, W. Woodford; and Nelson, William. History of Bergen and Passaic Counties, New Jersey, with Biographical Sketches of Many of its Pioneers and Prominent Men., Philadelphia: Everts and Peck, 1882.
- Harvey, Cornelius Burnham (ed.), Genealogical History of Hudson and Bergen Counties, New Jersey. New York: New Jersey Genealogical Publishing Co., 1900.
- Van Valen, James M. History of Bergen County, New Jersey. New York: New Jersey Publishing and Engraving Co., 1900.
- Westervelt, Frances A. (Frances Augusta), 1858–1942, History of Bergen County, New Jersey, 1630–1923, Lewis Historical Publishing Company, 1923.
