= Oradell, New Jersey =

Borough in Bergen County, New Jersey, US

- Borough
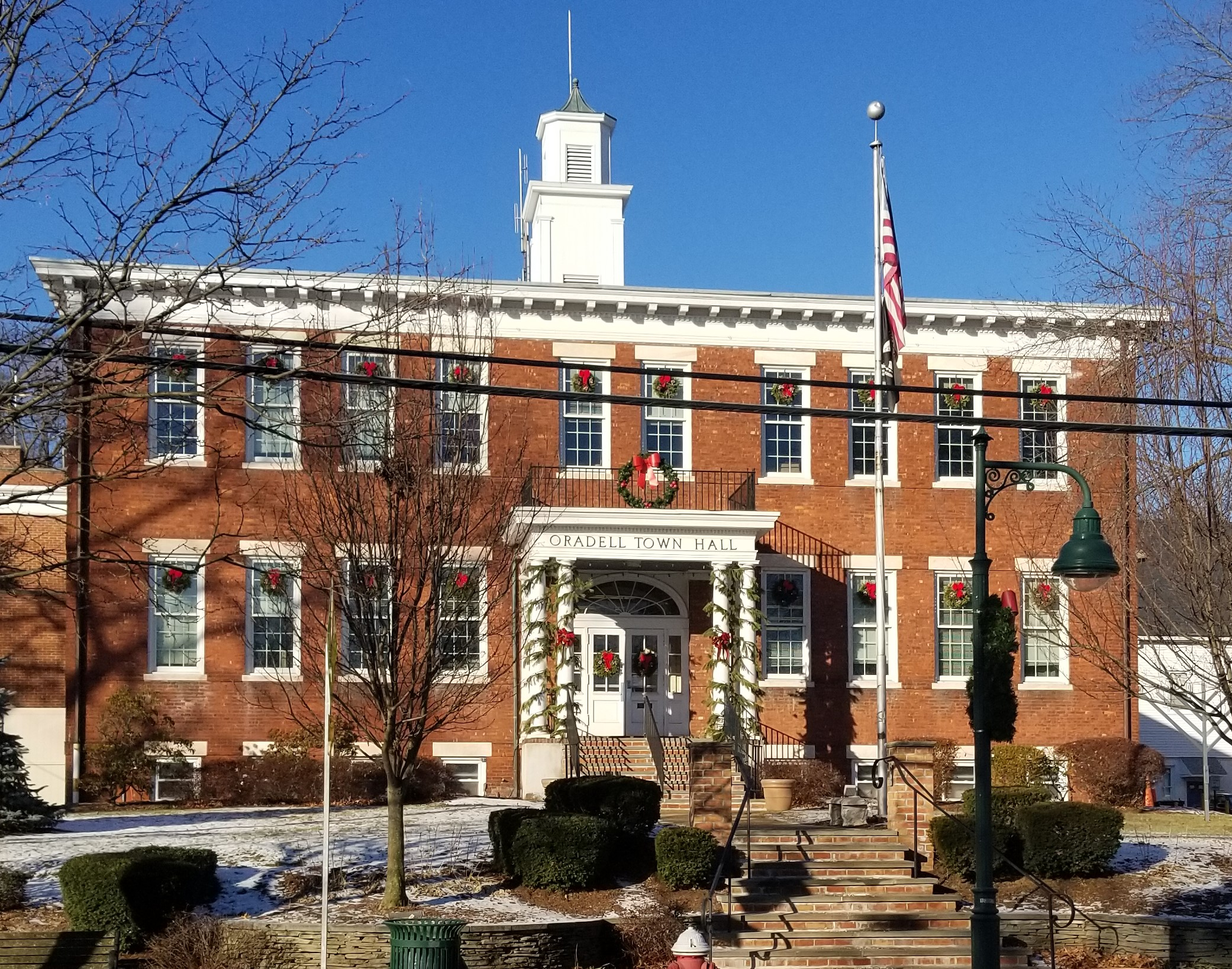
- Oradell Borough Hall from Kinderkamack Road in January 2018

- Flag Seal

- Location of Oradell in Bergen County highlighted in red (left). Inset map: Location of Bergen County in New Jersey highlighted in orange (right).

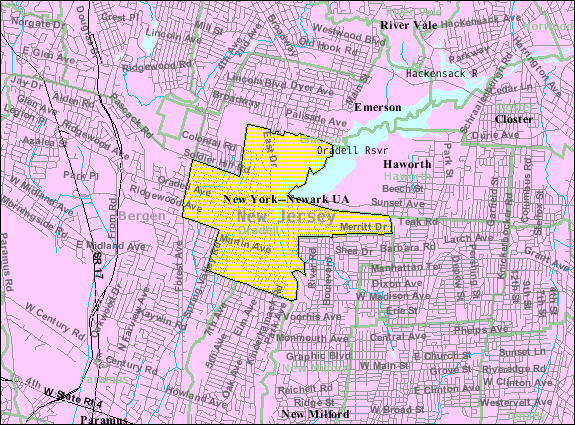
- Census Bureau map of Oradell, New Jersey

- Location in Bergen County Location in New Jersey Location in the United States
- Coordinates: 40.956653°N 74.032862°W
- Country: United States
- State: New Jersey
- County: Bergen
- Incorporated: March 8, 1894 as Delford
- Renamed: November 12, 1920 as Oradell

Government
  - Type: Borough
  - Body: Borough Council
  - Mayor: James Koth III (R, term ends December 31, 2027)
  - Administrator: Edward Hynes
  - Municipal clerk: Laura J. Lyons

Area
  - Total: 2.57 sq mi (6.65 km^{2})
  - Land: 2.41 sq mi (6.25 km^{2})
  - Water: 0.15 sq mi (0.40 km^{2}) 6.07%
  - Rank: 370th of 565 in state 37th of 70 in county
- Elevation: 39 ft (12 m)

Population (2020)
  - Total: 8,244
  - Estimate (2023): 8,188
  - Rank: 287th of 565 in state 50th of 70 in county
  - Density: 3,419.3/sq mi (1,320.2/km^{2})
  - Rank: 197th of 565 in state 40th of 70 in county
- Time zone: UTC−05:00 (Eastern (EST))
  - Summer (DST): UTC−04:00 (Eastern (EDT))
- ZIP Code: 07649
- Area code: 201
- FIPS code: 3400354990
- GNIS feature ID: 0885337
- Website: www.oradell.org

Oradell is a borough in Bergen County, in the U.S. state of New Jersey. As of the 2020 United States census, the borough's population was 8,244, an increase of 266 (+3.3%) from the 2010 census count of 7,978, which in turn reflected a decline of 69 (-0.9%) from the 8,047 counted in the 2000 census. The borough includes a dam on the Hackensack River that forms the Oradell Reservoir. Oradell is a suburb of New York City, located approximately 15 miles (24 km) northwest of Midtown Manhattan.

Oradell was originally formed on March 8, 1894, as the borough of Delford, from portions of Harrington Township, Midland Township (now Rochelle Park) and Palisades Township. The borough was formed during the "Boroughitis" phenomenon then sweeping through Bergen County, in which 26 boroughs were formed in the county in 1894 alone. The name "Delford" was a portmanteau created from the names of two communities within the new borough: Oradell and New Milford. The Hotel Delford had been constructed in 1870 after the construction of the first railroad to reach the area. On November 12, 1920, the borough's name was officially changed to "Oradell", based on the results of a referendum held ten days earlier. Oradell derives its name from "ora" (Latin for "edge") and "dell".

New Jersey Monthly ranked Oradell as the 68th best place to live in New Jersey in its 2010 rankings of the "Top Towns" in the state. This ranking also makes the borough the seventh best place to live in Bergen County.

== Geography ==
According to the United States Census Bureau, the borough had a total area of 2.57 square miles (6.65 km^{2}), including 2.41 square miles (6.25 km^{2}) of land and 0.16 square miles (0.40 km^{2}) of water (6.07%).

Unincorporated communities, localities and place names located partially or completely within the borough include Delford.

The borough borders the Bergen County municipalities of Dumont, Emerson, Haworth, New Milford, Paramus and River Edge.

Oradell Reservoir was formed by the Oradell Reservoir Dam placed on the Hackensack River, which was started in 1921 and finished in 1923. The reservoir is fed by the Pascack Brook and Dwars Kill in addition to the Hackensack River. The Dam has greatly reduced the amount of flooding in the eastern part of Oradell caused by the Hackensack River, though it also resulted in the loss of flora and fauna that depended on the fresh water that flowed down the river. Fed by rain from Hurricane Irene in August 2011, the water level in the reservoir rose two feet above the top of the dam, allowing billions of gallons of water to flow over the dam and exacerbating flooding conditions in Oradell and New Milford.

As of 2026, the borough is a member of Local Leaders for Responsible Planning in order to address the borough's Mount Laurel doctrine-based housing obligations.

=== Climate ===
The climate in this area is characterized by hot, humid summers and generally mild to cool winters. According to the Köppen Climate Classification system, Oradell has a humid subtropical climate, abbreviated "Cfa" on climate maps.

== Demographics ==
Historical population
Census	Pop.	Note	%±
1900	746		—
1910	1,005		34.7%
1920	1,286		28.0%
1930	2,360		83.5%
1940	2,802		18.7%
1950	3,665		30.8%
1960	7,487		104.3%
1970	8,903		18.9%
1980	8,658		−2.8%
1990	8,024		−7.3%
2000	8,047		0.3%
2010	7,978		−0.9%
2020	8,244		3.3%
2023 (est.)	8,188	▼	−0.7%
Population sources: 1900–1920 1900–1910; 1910–1930 1900–2020; 2000 2010 2020

=== Racial and ethnic composition ===
Oradell borough, New Jersey – Racial and ethnic composition Note: the US Census treats Hispanic/Latino as an ethnic category. This table excludes Latinos from the racial categories and assigns them to a separate category. Hispanics/Latinos may be of any race.
Race / Ethnicity (NH = Non-Hispanic)	Pop 2000	Pop 2010	Pop 2020	% 2000	% 2010	% 2020
White alone (NH)	7,047	6,537	5,889	87.57%	81.94%	71.43%
Black or African American alone (NH)	34	46	73	0.42%	0.58%	0.89%
Native American or Alaska Native alone (NH)	0	5	7	0.00%	0.06%	0.08%
Asian alone (NH)	649	895	1,277	8.07%	11.22%	15.49%
Native Hawaiian or Pacific Islander alone (NH)	1	0	0	0.01%	0.00%	0.00%
Other race alone (NH)	2	7	39	0.02%	0.09%	0.47%
Mixed race or Multiracial (NH)	65	91	225	0.81%	1.14%	2.73%
Hispanic or Latino (any race)	249	397	734	3.09%	4.98%	8.90%
Total	8,047	7,978	8,244	100.00%	100.00%	100.00%

=== 2020 census ===
As of the 2020 census, Oradell had a population of 8,244. The median age was 43.9 years. 23.6% of residents were under the age of 18 and 19.2% were 65 years of age or older. For every 100 females, there were 93.7 males, and for every 100 females age 18 and older, there were 90.8 males age 18 and older.

100.0% of residents lived in urban areas, while 0.0% lived in rural areas.

There were 2,782 households, of which 39.1% had children under the age of 18 living in them. Of all households, 73.2% were married-couple households, 7.7% were households with a male householder and no spouse or partner present, and 17.1% were households with a female householder and no spouse or partner present. About 15.1% of all households were made up of individuals and 8.2% had someone living alone who was 65 years of age or older.

There were 2,850 housing units, of which 2.4% were vacant. The homeowner vacancy rate was 0.8% and the rental vacancy rate was 2.5%.

=== 2010 census ===
The 2010 United States census counted 7,978 people, 2,749 households, and 2,293 families in the borough. The population density was 3,291.5 per square mile (1,270.9/km^{2}). There were 2,831 housing units at an average density of 1,168.0 per square mile (451.0/km^{2}). The racial makeup was 85.79% (6,844) White, 0.68% (54) Black or African American, 0.08% (6) Native American, 11.26% (898) Asian, 0.00% (0) Pacific Islander, 0.80% (64) from other races, and 1.40% (112) from two or more races. Hispanic or Latino of any race were 4.98% (397) of the population.

Of the 2,749 households, 39.1% had children under the age of 18; 73.5% were married couples living together; 7.7% had a female householder with no husband present and 16.6% were non-families. Of all households, 14.8% were made up of individuals and 7.7% had someone living alone who was 65 years of age or older. The average household size was 2.87 and the average family size was 3.20.

26.1% of the population were under the age of 18, 5.6% from 18 to 24, 19.8% from 25 to 44, 31.9% from 45 to 64, and 16.6% who were 65 years of age or older. The median age was 44.1 years. For every 100 females, the population had 91.6 males. For every 100 females ages 18 and older there were 89.2 males.

The Census Bureau's 2006–2010 American Community Survey showed that (in 2010 inflation-adjusted dollars) median household income was $123,750 (with a margin of error of +/− $23,641) and the median family income was $147,139 (+/− $14,419). Males had a median income of $91,332 (+/− $10,621) versus $68,208 (+/− $17,195) for females. The per capita income for the borough was $51,654. About 1.4% of families and 1.9% of the population were below the poverty line, including none of those under age 18 and 4.2% of those age 65 or over.

Same-sex couples headed 14 households in 2010, an increase from the 13 counted in 2000.

=== 2000 census ===
As of the 2000 United States census, there were 8,047 people, 2,789 households and 2,300 families residing in the borough. The population density was 3,319.0 inhabitants per square mile (1,281.5/km^{2}). There were 2,833 housing units at an average density of 1,168.5 per square mile (451.2/km^{2}). The racial makeup of the borough was 90.07% White, 0.48% African American, 0.04% Native American, 8.09% Asian, 0.01% Pacific Islander, 0.32% from other races, and 0.98% from two or more races. Hispanic or Latino of any race were 3.09% of the population.

3.1% of Oradell's residents identified themselves as being of Armenian American ancestry. This was the 11th highest percentage of Armenian American people in any place in the United States with 1,000 or more residents identifying their ancestry.

There were 2,789 households, of which 38.3% had children under the age of 18 living with them, 73.9% were married couples living together, 6.7% had a female householder with no husband present, and 17.5% were non-families. 15.7% of all households were made up of individuals, and 8.1% had someone living alone who was 65 years of age or older. The average household size was 2.83 and the average family size was 3.17.

Age distribution was 25.2% under the age of 18, 5.0% from 18 to 24, 26.3% from 25 to 44, 26.9% from 45 to 64, and 16.6% who were 65 years of age or older. The median age was 42 years. For every 100 females, there were 91.7 males. For every 100 females age 18 and over, there were 89.1 males.

The 2000 Census showed that median household income was $91,014 and the median family income was $102,842. Males had a median income of $76,683 versus $42,318 for females. The per capita income for the borough was $39,520. About 1.7% of families and 2.4% of the population were below the poverty line, including 2.8% of those under age 18 and 2.1% of those age 65 or over.

== Economy ==
Oradell is the headquarters for Huntington Learning Center, a learning center chain founded in 1977 that provides tutoring services for students in primary and secondary schools and is specialized in standardized test preparation.

== Government ==
=== Local government ===
Oradell is governed under the borough form of New Jersey municipal government, which is used in 218 municipalities (of the 564) statewide, making it the most common form of government in New Jersey. The governing body is comprised of a mayor and a borough council, with all positions elected at-large on a partisan basis as part of the November general election. A mayor is elected directly by the voters to a four-year term of office. The borough council is comprised of six members elected to serve three-year terms on a staggered basis, with two seats coming up for election each year in a three-year cycle. The borough form of government used by Oradell is a "weak mayor / strong council" government in which council members act as the legislative body with the mayor presiding at meetings and voting only in the event of a tie. The mayor can veto ordinances subject to an override by a two-thirds majority vote of the council. The mayor makes committee and liaison assignments for council members, and most appointments are made by the mayor with the advice and consent of the council.

As of 2025, the mayor of Oradell is a Republican, James Koth III, whose term of office ends on December 31, 2027. Members of the Borough Council are Council President Steven G. Carnevale (R, 2025), Jonathan Kern (R, 2026), Michael A. Staff (R, 2025), James "Ted" Gullo (R, 2026), Tom Kelly (R, 2027) and Roger Tashjian (D, 2027).

In the November 2023 general election, all three republican candidates, including one incumbent, won office, in an off year election cycle. The Oradell election turnout was a staggering 46.13%, the highest recorded for all municipalities for that year within Bergen County.

In May 2018, Miriam Yu was selected to fill the seat expiring in December 2019 that became vacant following the resignation of Andrew Rudman. In the November 2018 general election, Yu was elected to serve the balance of the term of office.

In the November 2017 general election, the Democratic and Republican candidates each took one seat. In the November 2016 general election, the Democratic and Republican candidates each took one seat. In the November 2015 general election, the Democratic and independent candidates who ran together as Put Oradell First won election to the mayoral and council seats up for vote, winning by a 2–1 margin over the Republican incumbents, who had not faced an election challenge since 2011.

=== Federal, state and county representation ===
Oradell is located in the 5th Congressional District and is part of New Jersey's 38th state legislative district.

For the 119th United States Congress, New Jersey's 5th congressional district is represented by Josh Gottheimer (D, Wyckoff). New Jersey is represented in the United States Senate by Democrats Cory Booker (Newark, term ends 2027) and Andy Kim (Moorestown, term ends 2031).

For the 2026–2027 session, the 38th legislative district of the New Jersey Legislature is represented in the State Senate by Joseph Lagana (D, Paramus) and in the General Assembly by Lisa Swain (D, Fair Lawn) and Chris Tully (D, Bergenfield).

Bergen County is governed by a directly elected County Executive, with legislative functions performed by a Board of County Commissioners comprised of seven members who are elected at-large to three-year terms in partisan elections on a staggered basis, with either two or three seats coming up for election each November; a Chairman and Vice Chairman are selected from among its seven members at a reorganization meeting held every January. As of 2025, the county executive is James J. Tedesco III (D, Paramus), whose four-year term of office ends December 31, 2026.

Bergen County's Commissioners are Chair Mary J. Amoroso (D, Mahwah, 2025), Vice Chair Steven A. Tanelli (D, North Arlington, 2027), Chair Pro Tem Joan Voss (D, Fort Lee, 2026), Rafael Marte (D, Bergenfield, 2026), Germaine M. Ortiz (D, Emerson, 2025), Thomas J. Sullivan Jr. (D, Montvale, 2025) and Tracy Silna Zur (D, Franklin Lakes, 2027).

Bergen County's elected constitutional officials are Clerk John S. Hogan (D, Northvale, 2026), Sheriff Anthony Cureton (D, Englewood, 2027) and Surrogate Michael R. Dressler (D, Cresskill, 2026).

=== Politics ===
United States presidential election results for Oradell 2024 2020 2016 2012 2008 2004
Year	Republican		Democratic		Third party(ies)	
Year	No.	%	No.	%	No.	%
2024	2,214	44.89%	2,603	52.78%	115	2.33%
2020	2,288	42.05%	3,086	56.72%	67	1.23%
2016	2,209	47.12%	2,345	50.02%	134	2.86%
2012	2,354	53.90%	1,973	45.18%	40	0.92%
2008	2,491	52.28%	2,245	47.11%	29	0.61%
2004	2,592	55.65%	2,034	43.67%	32	0.69%

As of November 2017, there were a total of 5,750 registered voters in Oradell, of which 1,535 were registered as Democrats, 1,750 were registered as Republicans and 2,451 were registered as unaffiliated. There were 14 voters registered as Libertarians or Greens. Among the borough's 2010 Census population, 70.0% (vs. 57.1% in Bergen County) were registered to vote, including 94.8% of those ages 18 and over (vs. 73.7% countywide).

In the 2016 presidential election, Democrat Hillary Clinton received 2,345 votes (49.6% vs. 54.2% countywide), ahead of Republican Donald Trump with 2,209 votes (46.7% vs. 41.1%) and other candidates with 173 votes (3.7% vs. 4.6%), among the 4,796 ballots cast by the borough's 6,130 registered voters, for a turnout of 78.2% (vs. 72.5% in Bergen County). In the 2012 presidential election, Republican Mitt Romney received 2,354 votes (53.7% vs. 43.5% countywide), ahead of Democrat Barack Obama with 1,973 votes (45.0% vs. 54.8%) and other candidates with 40 votes (0.9% vs. 0.9%), among the 4,386 ballots cast by the borough's 5,856 registered voters, for a turnout of 74.9% (vs. 70.4% in Bergen County). In the 2008 presidential election, Republican John McCain received 2,491 votes (51.9% vs. 44.5% countywide), ahead of Democrat Barack Obama with 2,245 votes (46.8% vs. 53.9%) and other candidates with 29 votes (0.6% vs. 0.8%), among the 4,798 ballots cast by the borough's 5,826 registered voters, for a turnout of 82.4% (vs. 76.8% in Bergen County). In the 2004 presidential election, Republican George W. Bush received 2,592 votes (55.5% vs. 47.2% countywide), ahead of Democrat John Kerry with 2,034 votes (43.5% vs. 51.7%) and other candidates with 32 votes (0.7% vs. 0.7%), among the 4,672 ballots cast by the borough's 5,696 registered voters, for a turnout of 82.0% (vs. 76.9% in the whole county).

Gubernatorial election results for Oradell
Year	Republican		Democratic		Third party(ies)	
Year	No.	%	No.	%	No.	%
2025	1,797	45.08%	2,176	54.59%	13	0.33%
2021	1,625	47.79%	1,746	51.35%	29	0.85%
2017	1,358	48.73%	1,396	50.09%	33	1.18%
2013	1,797	66.38%	878	32.43%	32	1.18%
2009	1,775	54.33%	1,320	40.40%	172	5.26%
2005	1,829	54.74%	1,467	43.91%	45	1.35%

In the 2017 gubernatorial election, Democrat Phil Murphy received 1,396 votes ahead of Kim Guadagno with 1,358 votes. In the 2013 gubernatorial election, Republican Chris Christie received 66.4% of the vote (1,797 cast), ahead of Democrat Barbara Buono with 32.4% (878 votes), and other candidates with 1.2% (32 votes), among the 2,753 ballots cast by the borough's 5,717 registered voters (46 ballots were spoiled), for a turnout of 48.2%. In the 2009 gubernatorial election, Republican Chris Christie received 1,775 votes (53.8% vs. 45.8% countywide), ahead of Democrat Jon Corzine with 1,320 votes (40.0% vs. 48.0%), Independent Chris Daggett with 158 votes (4.8% vs. 4.7%) and other candidates with 14 votes (0.4% vs. 0.5%), among the 3,302 ballots cast by the borough's 5,745 registered voters, yielding a 57.5% turnout (vs. 50.0% in the county).

United States Senate election results for Oradell1
Year	Republican		Democratic		Third party(ies)	
Year	No.	%	No.	%	No.	%
2024	2,155	45.54%	2,502	52.87%	75	1.58%
2018	1,668	50.06%	1,577	47.33%	87	2.61%
2012	2,132	52.24%	1,894	46.41%	55	1.35%
2006	1,869	56.76%	1,389	42.18%	35	1.06%

United States Senate election results for Oradell2
Year	Republican		Democratic		Third party(ies)	
Year	No.	%	No.	%	No.	%
2020	2,352	43.87%	2,936	54.77%	73	1.36%
2014	1,204	49.12%	1,218	49.69%	29	1.18%
2013	877	49.35%	885	49.80%	15	0.84%
2008	2,277	52.06%	2,049	46.84%	48	1.10%

== Education ==
The Oradell Public School District serves students in kindergarten through sixth grade at Oradell Public School. As of the 2019–20 school year, the district, comprised of one school, had an enrollment of 768 students and 64.2 classroom teachers (on an FTE basis), for a student–teacher ratio of 12.0:1.

Oradell and neighboring River Edge share a combined school district for seventh through twelfth grades, River Dell Regional School District which was established in 1958. Schools in the district (with 2019–20 enrollment data from the National Center for Education Statistics) are River Dell Regional Middle School in River Edge with 541 students in grades 7–8 and River Dell High School in Oradell with 1,062 students in grades 9–12.

Public school students from the borough, and all of Bergen County, are eligible to attend the secondary education programs offered by the Bergen County Technical Schools, which include the Bergen County Academies in Hackensack, and the Bergen Tech campus in Teterboro or Paramus. The district offers programs on a shared-time or full-time basis, with admission based on a selective application process and tuition covered by the student's home school district.

Oradell is home to Bergen Catholic High School, a private Roman Catholic college preparatory school that was founded in 1955 and is run by the Christian Brothers of Ireland, under the auspices of the Roman Catholic Archdiocese of Newark. Bergen Catholic serves students in ninth through twelfth grade, and had an enrollment of 667 students in the 2017–2018 school year. It offers 17 sports at the varsity level, and attracts students from all over the Northern Jersey region. Oradell is also home to St. Joseph Elementary School, a Catholic school that serves children from Pre-K through grade 8, as part of the Newark Archdiocese.

== Emergency services ==
Oradell has a volunteer fire department that was first established in 1894, located on Kinderkamack Road. It is home to Tower 21, Squad 22, Engine 23, Engine 24, and Scuba 26.

Oradell has a police department, also located on Kinderkamack Road near the fire station.

== Organizations ==
Oradell has two Boy Scout troops—Troop 36 and Troop 142—as well as two Cub Scout packs; Pack 136 and Pack 142.

Troop 36 was established on February 11, 1911. Originally known as Troop 1, it was one of the first Boy Scout troops chartered in the United States and the second troop chartered in New Jersey. Sponsored by American Legion Post 41 since 1919, Troop 36 is currently the oldest Boy Scout troop in the state of New Jersey and has the distinction of being the second-oldest continually operating troop in the United States. It is one of the largest and most decorated troops in New Jersey. Troop 36 has more than 170 Eagle Scouts.

Troop 142 was re-established in 1999, and has over 40 members and more than 30 Eagle Scouts.

== Transportation ==
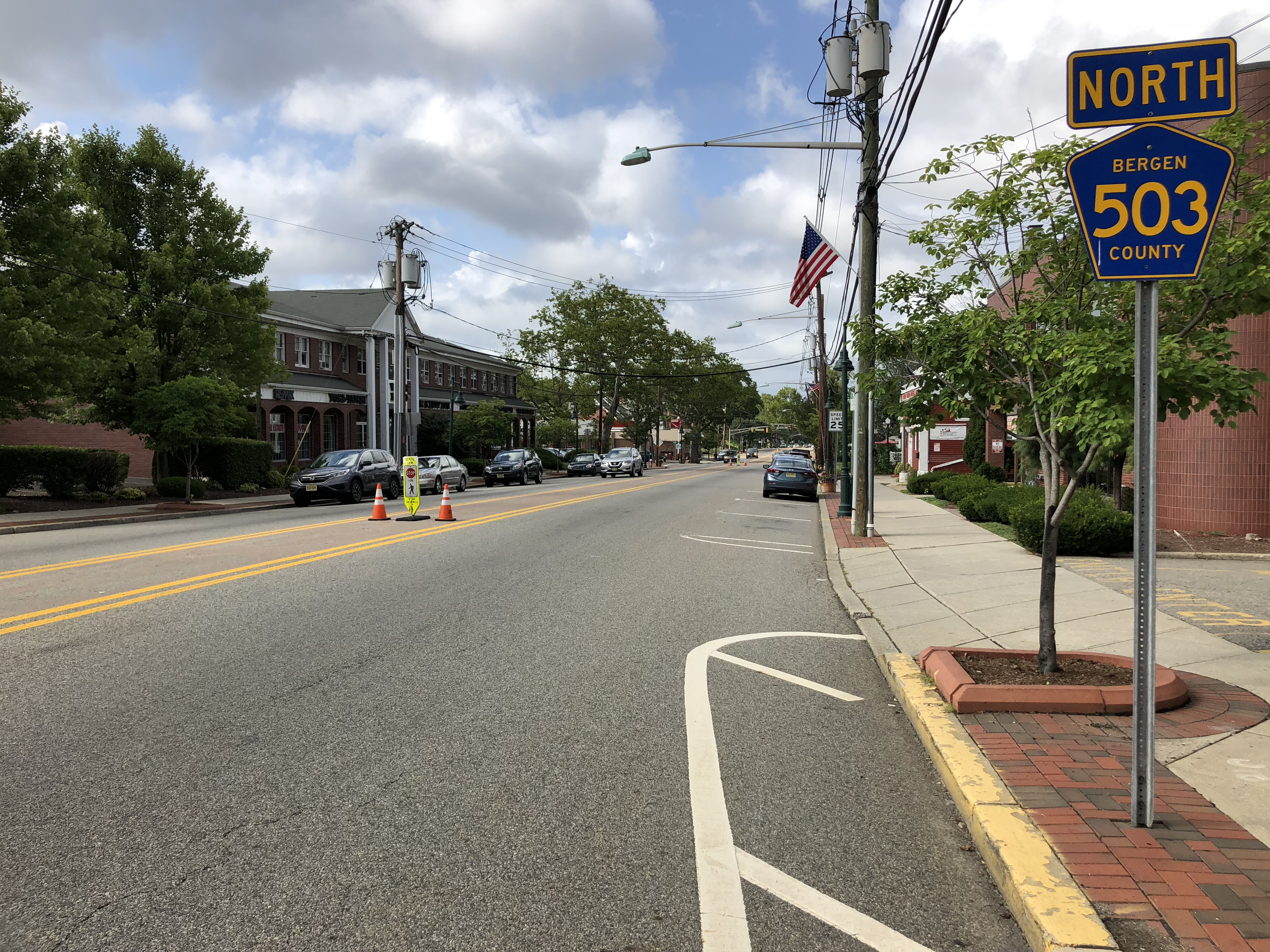
County Route 503 (Kinderkamack Road) northbound in Oradell

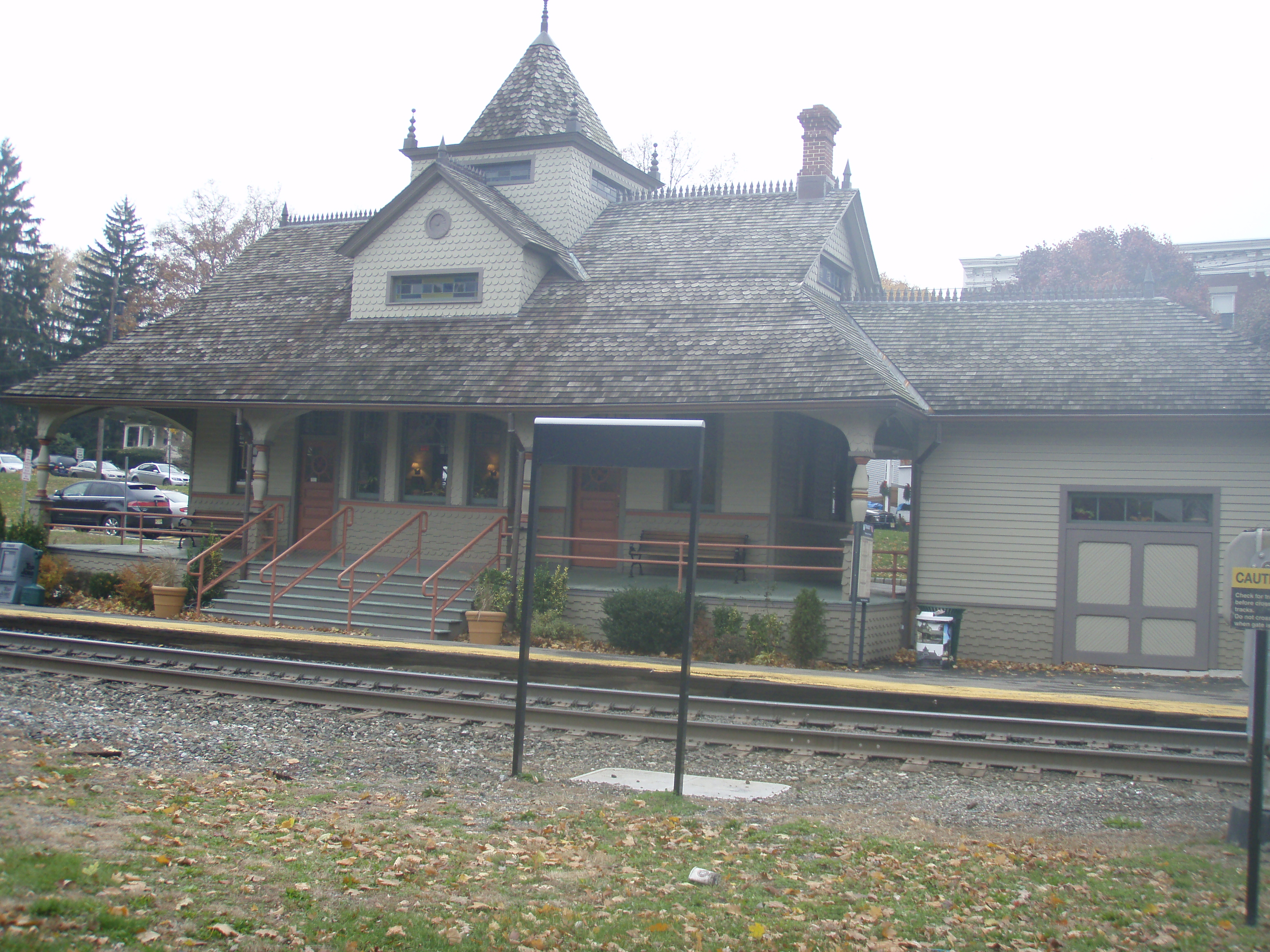
The Oradell train station, c. 2007.

=== Roads and highways ===
As of May 2010, the borough had a total of 35.17 miles (56.60 km) of roadways, of which 30.06 miles (48.38 km) were maintained by the municipality and 5.11 miles (8.22 km) by Bergen County.

County Route 503 is the only significant road serving Oradell. It follows Kinderkamack Road south to north through the middle of the borough.

=== Public transportation ===
Train service in Oradell is provided by NJ Transit at the Oradell station, located at Oradell and Maple Avenues. on the Pascack Valley Line.

NJ Transit bus service is available to and from the Port Authority Bus Terminal in Midtown Manhattan on the 165 route, while local service is offered on the 762 and 772 bus lines.

Rockland Coaches offers service on the 11T/11AT route from Stony Point, New York, to the Port Authority Bus Terminal.

== Places of interest ==
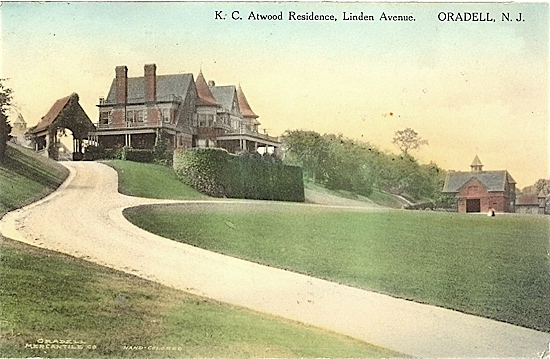
The Atwood-Blauvelt Mansion (1897)

- The Atwood-Blauvelt mansion on Kinderkamack Road, built 1897, a prominent example of shingle style architecture. The property, covering 4.3 acres (1.7 ha), was purchased at foreclosure for $100 in March 2013, including assumption of mortgages totaling $3.9 million acquired over several years. The purchaser, a subsidiary of CareOne, had submitted plans to develop an assisted living facility on the site under which the mansion would be preserved.
- The New Milford Plant of the Hackensack Water Company was a water filtration and pumping plant located on Van Buskirk Island, an artificially created island in the Hackensack River, that operated until 1990 when it was donated to Bergen County.
- A small park in the center of town at Kinderkamack Road and Oradell Avenue was created in 1962 to honor astronaut Wally Schirra, marked by a plaque that reads "Home of Commander Walter M. Schirra Jr., USN, the first Jerseyman to orbit the Earth, Oct 3, 1962".
- Riverdell Hospital was located on Kinderkamack Road. Opened in 1959, it closed in 1981 after it became known as the site of the alleged killings in the "Dr. X" murder trial of Mario Jascalevich and was torn down in 1984.
- Memorial Field is a large park and field located across from Oradell Public School. Many recreational sport games are hosted on these fields, and the elementary school utilizes the park.
- The Doug Parcells Athletic Complex is a large field complex on Ridgewood Avenue next to the Oradell Swim Club. It houses two turf fields, both of which host recreational sporting events. It also features a fieldhouse and a small playground. The facility was named in 2005 for Doug Parcells, a former borough recreation director who was the brother of former NFL coach Bill Parcells.
- Little Firehouse Theater is a stage theater with 210 seats that was originally a firehouse. The Bergen County Players, established in 1949, perform plays and musicals at the theater.

== Media appearances ==
Rockapella, the a cappella group best known for performing on the children's game show Where in The World Is Carmen Sandiego?, had their first gig at a private party in Oradell on April 5, 1986.

In the 2004 movie Taxi, a map read by Detective Washburn (Jimmy Fallon) shows a fictional uncompleted highway off the Garden State Parkway in Oradell. The approximate location of the uncompleted highway is the location of the Bergen Regional Medical Center.

== Notable people ==
People who were born in, residents of, or otherwise closely associated with Oradell include:

- Hugh David Black (1903–1942), officer in the United States Navy killed in action during World War II, who is the namesake of the USS Black and for whom Commander Black Drive is named
- Roger Breslin (1937–2025), attorney who served as Prosecutor of Bergen County from 1977 to 1982
- Charles Livingston Bull (1874–1932), wildlife illustrator
- Ginny Capicchioni, lacrosse goaltender who was the first woman to compete in the National Lacrosse League
- Graham Clarke (born 1970), musician, songwriter, arranger, and entertainer
- Kevin DelGobbo (1964–2017), politician who served in the Connecticut House of Representatives from 1997 to 2009
- David D. Demarest (1819–1898), author and theologian
- Joe DiPietro (born 1960), playwright and author
- Percy Keese Fitzhugh (1876–1950), author of many popular children's books, resided in Oradell from 1927 until his death in 1950
- Lynn Forester de Rothschild (born 1954), chief executive officer of E.L. Rothschild, a holding company she owns with her husband Sir Evelyn Robert de Rothschild
- Mark Gorton (born 1966), founder of peer-to-peer file sharing service Limewire and financial firm Tower Research
- Hugh J. Grant (1858–1910), politician who served two terms as the 88th mayor of New York City, from 1889 to 1892, who remains the youngest mayor in the city's history
- Ellsworth Kelly (1923–2015), painter, sculptor, and printmaker associated with hard-edge painting, Color Field painting and the minimalist school
- Vince Lombardi (1913–1970), National Football League Head Coach of the Green Bay Packers. Lombardi was an assistant coach for the New York Giants while living on Oradell Avenue during the 1950s
- Bill Madden (born 1946), sportswriter for the New York Daily News
- Bill McGovern (1962–2023), American football coach
- Jim McGovern (born 1965), professional golfer
- Rob McGovern (born 1966), former American football linebacker who played for the Kansas City Chiefs, Pittsburgh Steelers and New England Patriots
- Dan Oates (born 1955), police chief of Aurora, Colorado
- George Papp (1916–1989), comic book artist who co-created the Green Arrow character with Mort Weisinger and was best known as one of the principal artists on the long-running Superboy feature for DC Comics
- Bill Parcells (born 1941), National Football League Head Coach of the New York Giants, New York Jets and the Dallas Cowboys
- Harry Randall Jr. (1927–2013), politician who served in the New Jersey General Assembly from 1962 to 1966 and from 1968 to 1970, after which he served as a member of the Bergen County Board of Chosen Freeholders
- Nelson Riddle (1921–1985), arranger and conductor
- Hezly Rivera (born 2008), artistic gymnast
- Darren Rizzi (born 1970), football coach
- Marie Rossi (1959–1991), Major, United States Army, served as a pilot for the 101st Airborne Division, served in Operation Desert Storm. She was killed when the Chinook helicopter that she was piloting crashed on March 1, 1991
- Rich Scanlon (born 1980), linebacker who has played for the New York Giants
- Wally Schirra (1923–2007), astronaut who was the only man to fly in America's first three space programs: Mercury, Gemini and Apollo
- Matt Silverstein (born 1979), co-creator of Drawn Together
- Guy Talarico (born 1955), member of the New Jersey General Assembly
- Yoojin Grace Wuertz (born 1980), novelist who wrote the 2017 book Everything Belongs To Us

== Sources ==
- Municipal Incorporations of the State of New Jersey (according to Counties) prepared by the Division of Local Government, Department of the Treasury (New Jersey); December 1, 1958.
- Clayton, W. Woodford; and Nelson, William. History of Bergen and Passaic Counties, New Jersey, with Biographical Sketches of Many of its Pioneers and Prominent Men., Philadelphia: Everts and Peck, 1882.
- Harvey, Cornelius Burnham (ed.), Genealogical History of Hudson and Bergen Counties, New Jersey. New York: New Jersey Genealogical Publishing Co., 1900.
- Van Valen, James M. History of Bergen County, New Jersey. New York: New Jersey Publishing and Engraving Co., 1900.
- Westervelt, Frances A. (Frances Augusta), 1858–1942, History of Bergen County, New Jersey, 1630–1923, Lewis Historical Publishing Company, 1923.
