= Freddie Hoffman =

American disabled sportsman

Freddie Hoffman (born c. 1959) is an American disabled sportsman. He has ridden his bicycle in the cause of the leukemia research and raised more than 3.82 million dollars.

== Early life ==
He is from River Edge, New Jersey. He has profound learning disabilities. As a child Hoffman had few if any friends and was attracted to bicycle riding as his escape from loneliness. His heroes were the astronauts who had been to the Moon and his goal was to pedal his bicycle the distance to the Moon and back. He describes his childhood bicycle as being his "rocket ship."

== Bicycling ==
Hoffman keeps mileage logs and, as of April 24, 2023, has logged 1,932,000 miles.

Hoffman has ridden across the United States, has visited every one of the contiguous 48 states, and has been honored by more than 30 state governors. Every Spring, Hoffman asks friends and supporters for pledges to the Leukemia and Lymphoma Foundation for his upcoming ride that summer.

== Personal life ==
Hoffman's mother died of leukemia in 1986. In addition to naming his bicycles "Ruth E." after her, he has focused on raising money in her memory to support leukemia research.

He is a part-time janitor at a church in New Jersey.
