= River Dell Regional School District =

Public school district in Bergen County, New Jersey, US

Address
- 230 Woodland Avenue River Edge, Bergen County, New Jersey, 07661; United States
- Coordinates: 40.939398°N 74.036597°W

District information
- Grades: 7-12
- Superintendent: James J. Albro
- Business administrator: Trude Engle
- Schools: 2

Students and staff
- Enrollment: 1,606 (as of 2021–22)
- Faculty: 140.2 FTEs
- Student–teacher ratio: 11.5:1

Other information
- District Factor Group: I
- Website: www.riverdell.org
Ind.	Per pupil	District spending	Rank (*)	7-12 average	%± vs. average
1A	Total Spending	$19,735	16	$18,891	4.5%
1	Budgetary Cost	14,838	18	14,586	1.7%
2	Classroom Instruction	8,865	22	8,339	6.3%
6	Support Services	1,812	10	2,114	−14.3%
8	Administrative Cost	1,929	41	1,561	23.6%
10	Operations & Maintenance	1,531	7	1,798	−14.8%
13	Extracurricular Activities	697	13	673	3.6%
16	Median Teacher Salary	79,286	40	65,769
Data from NJDoE 2014 Taxpayers' Guide to Education Spending. *Of 7-12 districts with any number of students. Lowest spending=1; Highest=47

The River Dell Regional School District is a regional school district serving students in seventh through twelfth grades from the communities of River Edge and Oradell in Bergen County, in the U.S. state of New Jersey.

As of the 2021–22 school year, the district, comprising two schools, had an enrollment of 1,606 students and 140.2 classroom teachers (on an FTE basis), for a student–teacher ratio of 11.5:1.

The district is classified by the New Jersey Department of Education as being in District Factor Group "I", the second-highest of eight groupings. District Factor Groups organize districts statewide to allow comparison by common socioeconomic characteristics of the local districts. From lowest socioeconomic status to highest, the categories are A, B, CD, DE, FG, GH, I and J.

== History ==
In October 1975, a Superior Court judge sentenced to jail 75 of 200 striking members of the River Dell Education Association for violating a back-to-work order that he had issued earlier in the month. The judge also mandated that the striking employees contribute $250 towards a scholarship fund,

President Ronald Reagan spoke at the high school on June 21, 1984, where he advocated on behalf of a drinking age of 21 as a minimum standard.

== Awards and recognition ==
During the 1997-98 school year, River Dell High School was recognized with the National Blue Ribbon School Award of Excellence by the United States Department of Education, the highest award an American school can receive.

The school was the 31st-ranked public high school in New Jersey out of 339 schools statewide in New Jersey Monthly magazine's September 2014 cover story on the state's "Top Public High Schools", using a new ranking methodology.

For the 2001-02 school year, River Dell Middle School was named a "Star School" by the New Jersey Department of Education, the highest honor that a New Jersey school can achieve.

== Schools ==
Schools in the district (with 2021–22 enrollment data from the National Center for Education Statistics) are:

- River Dell Regional Middle School in River Edge (with 589 students in grades 7-8)
  - Robert Urbanovich, principal
- River Dell High School in Oradell (with 999 students in grades 9-12)
  - Brian Pepe, principal

== Administration ==
Core members of the district's administration are:

- James J. Albro, superintendent of schools
- Trude Engle, business administrator and board secretary

== Board of education ==
The district's board of education is composed of nine members who set policy and oversee the fiscal and educational operation of the district through its administration. As a Type II school district, the board's trustees are elected directly by voters to serve three-year terms of office on a staggered basis, with three seats up for election each year held (since 2012) as part of the November general election. The board appoints a superintendent to oversee the district's day-to-day operations and a business administrator to supervise the business functions of the district. Seats on the district's board of education are allocated based on the population of the constituent districts, with four assigned to Oradell and five to River Edge.
