= River Dell High School =

High school in Bergen County, New Jersey, US

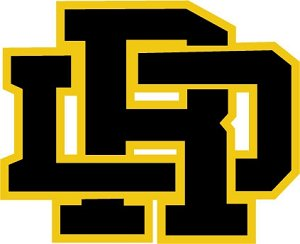

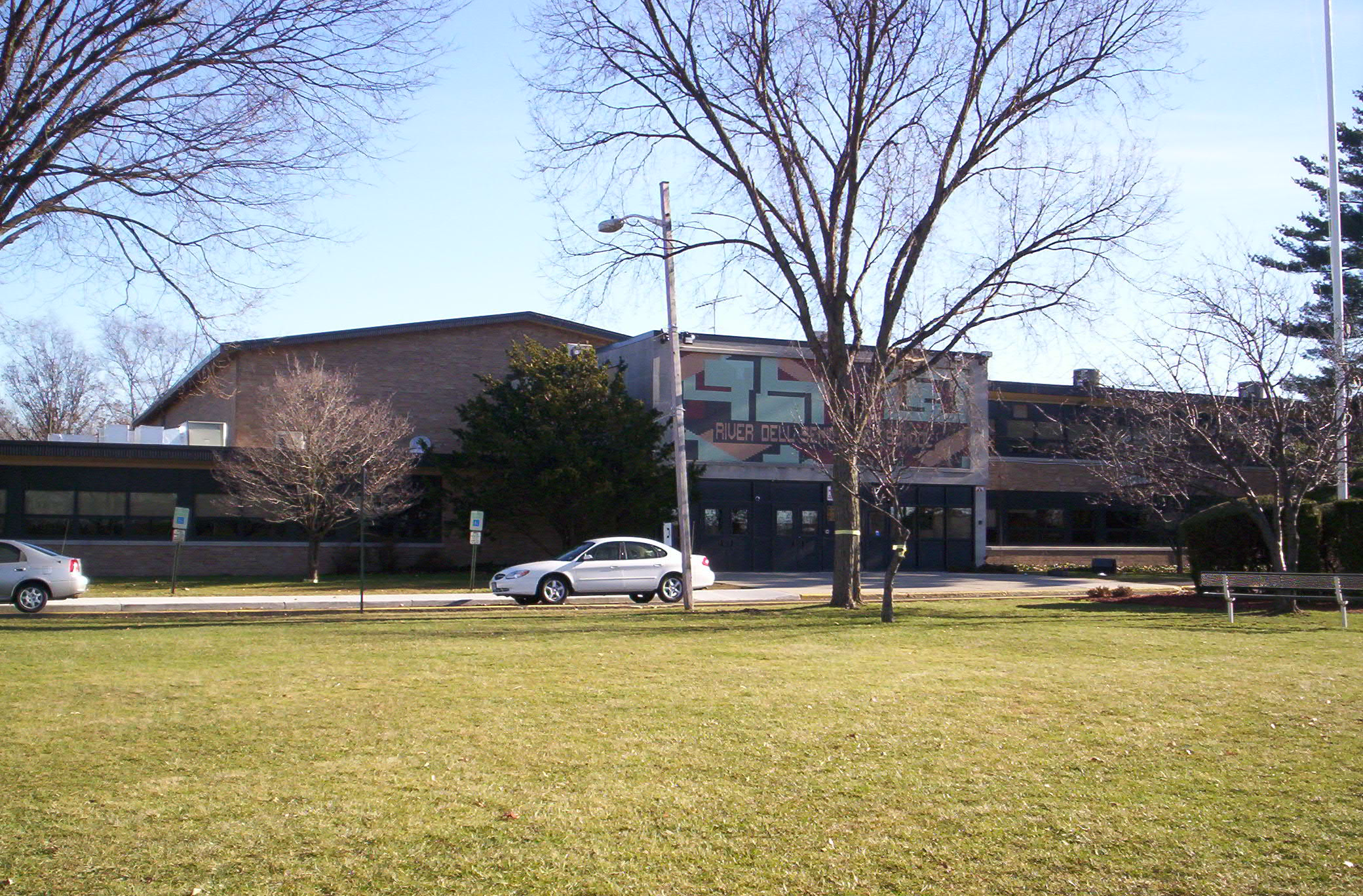

Location
- 55 Pyle Street; Oradell, Bergen County, New Jersey 07649; United States
- 40.944425°N 74.034642°W

Information
- Type: Public high school
- Motto: "Dedicated to academic excellence and social responsibility."
- NCES School ID: 341226000786
- Principal: Brian Pepe
- Faculty: 89.0 FTEs
- Grades: 9–12
- Enrollment: 992 (as of 2023–24)
- Student to teacher ratio: 11.2:1
- Colors: Black and gold
- Athletics conference: Big North Conference (general); North Jersey Super Football Conference (football)
- Team name: Golden Hawks
- Rival: Westwood Regional High School
- Website: rdhs.riverdell.org

River Dell High School is a four-year comprehensive regional public high school, part of the River Dell Regional School District, which is shared with the neighboring communities of Oradell and River Edge in Bergen County, in the U.S. state of New Jersey. Located in Oradell, River Dell High School has been a four-year high school since 1994, and is accredited by the New Jersey Department of Education.

As of the 2023–24 school year, the school had an enrollment of 992 students and 89.0 classroom teachers (on an FTE basis), for a student–teacher ratio of 11.2:1. There were 11 students (1.1% of enrollment) eligible for free lunch and 4 (0.4% of students) eligible for reduced-cost lunch.

== History ==
President Ronald Reagan spoke at the high school in June 1984, where he advocated on behalf of a drinking age of 21 as a minimum standard.

== Awards, recognition and rankings ==
During the 1997–98 school year, River Dell High School was recognized with the National Blue Ribbon School Award of Excellence by the United States Department of Education, the highest award an American school can receive.

The school was the 31st-ranked public high school in New Jersey out of 339 schools statewide in New Jersey Monthly magazine's September 2014 cover story on the state's "Top Public High Schools", using a new ranking methodology. The school had been ranked 104th in the state of 328 schools in 2012, after being ranked 27th in 2010 out of 322 schools listed. The magazine ranked the school 37th in 2008 out of 316 schools. Schooldigger.com ranked the school tied for 113th out of 381 public high schools statewide in its 2011 rankings (an increase of 16 positions from the 2010 ranking) which were based on the combined percentage of students classified as proficient or above proficient on the mathematics (87.5%) and language arts literacy (94.40%) components of the High School Proficiency Assessment (HSPA).

In the 2011 "Ranking America's High Schools" issue by The Washington Post, the school was ranked 63rd in New Jersey and 1,866th nationwide.

In its 2013 report on "America's Best High Schools", The Daily Beast ranked the school 819th in the nation among participating public high schools and 60th among schools in New Jersey.

In 2024, U.S. News & World Report ranked the school 53rd in New Jersey and 1,145th in the United States.

== Curriculum ==
River Dell High School offers students a wide variety of college preparation, honors, and Advanced Placement courses. River Dell offers a Junior MBA program in which students are eligible to earn a scholarship after taking five business-related courses and completing a project if they intend to major in business in college.

River Dell requires every student to take three years of mathematics, two years of foreign language (French, Spanish, Italian, or Mandarin Chinese), four years of English, three years of science and three years of history. Concurrently, as required by the state of New Jersey, students must fulfill five credits in business, technology and life-skills-related classes. The school offers 13 Advanced Placement courses, a senior internship and mentorship where students are allowed to get a hands-on feel for various professions, and various Syracuse University Project Advance (SUPA) offering a student a chance to earn college credits.

== Facilities and programs ==
Construction was completed as the result of a 2003 referendum that approved a $28.9 million school renovation project. Many of the facilities in the school were inaccessible during the construction. Following the completion of the construction in the spring of 2007, the school had a new wing, which included six science and eight general classrooms, two music rooms, and two gymnasiums. Enhancements to the library, art rooms, technology and computer labs, and athletic fields were also included.

Starting with the class of 2009, each freshman has received a hybrid tablet PC–notebook computer for use during their four years of high school. In June before the 2008–09 school year, the Board of Education voted to buy 1,100 HP laptops so that every student in all four classes could use a new laptop. These replaced the former Tablet PCs that were given out with a traditional laptop computer.

== Extracurricular activities ==
=== Athletics ===
The River Dell Regional High School Golden Hawks compete in the Big North Conference, which is comprised public and private high schools in Bergen and Passaic counties, and was established following a reorganization of sports leagues in Northern New Jersey by the New Jersey State Interscholastic Athletic Association (NJSIAA). The school had previously competed in the Bergen County Scholastic League (BCSL) American Conference, which included schools in Bergen and Hudson counties. With 803 students in grades 10–12, the school was classified by the NJSIAA for the 2019–20 school year as Group III for most athletic competition purposes, which included schools with an enrollment of 761 to 1,058 students in that grade range. The football team competes in the Patriot Red division of the North Jersey Super Football Conference, which includes 112 schools competing in 20 divisions, making it the nation's biggest football-only high school sports league. The school was classified by the NJSIAA as Group III North for football for 2024–2026, which included schools with 700 to 884 students. The school colors are black and gold.

The school participates as the host school / lead agency for joint cooperative boys / girls swimming teams with Westwood Regional High School. The school also hosts a co-op ice hockey team that includes Emerson Junior-Senior High School and Westwood. These co-op programs operate under agreements scheduled to expire at the end of the 2023–24 school year.

The school won the NJSIAA's 2015-16 Group III ShopRite Cup, having won first-place finishes in girls volleyball, both boys and girls winter track, and boys spring track and field, a second-place finish in football, third place in boys cross country, fourth in girls cross country, and having no disqualifications in the fall or spring seasons.

The football team was awarded the sectional championship by the New Jersey State Interscholastic Athletic Association in 1961 (as co-champion), 1964, 1967 (co-champion), 1970, 1971 and 1972 (co-champion). Since the playoff system was introduced in 1974, the team has won the North I Group II state sectional championships in 1985, 1987 and 2007, and won the North II Group III title in 2016 and 2017. The 1985 team finished the season with an 11–0 record after winning the North I Group II state sectional title with a 41–0 win against Emerson Junior-Senior High School in the championship game. The 1987 team used their size to contain Hawthorne High School in the championship game to win the North I Group II state sectional title and finish the season at 11–0. River Dell's 2007 football team went undefeated, compiling a final record of 12–0, with a defense that allowed 28 points all season long. On December 1, 2007, the team won the North I, Group II state sectional championship with a 12–7 win over Pascack Valley High School, in a game played at Giants Stadium. The win was the team's first section title since 1987. The River Dell football team went undefeated in the BCSL American Division losing in the state sectional semi-finals to Jefferson Township High School. River Dell's 2009 football team played Ramsey High School for the North I, Group II state sectional championships at Giants Stadium, losing by a score of 36–10. After three consecutive losses in section finals, the football team won the North I, Group III state sectional title in 2016 with a 26–20 overtime win in the tournament final against Northern Valley Regional High School at Old Tappan. The team won its second consecutive title—and the program's fifth—in 2017, with a 28–7 win at MetLife Stadium in the North I Group III state sectional championship game against top-seeded Ramapo High School, a team that had beaten River Dell by a score of 23–20 earlier in the regular season. The school has had a football rivalry since 1976 with Westwood Regional High School called the "Bird Bowl", in which the winner receives a trophy with a football inside of a bird cage. Westwood leads the series with an overall record of 20-18 through the 2017 season. NJ.com listed the rivalry as 28th on its 2017 list "Ranking the 31 fiercest rivalries in N.J. HS football".

The boys' soccer team finished the 1967 season with a record of 16-1-2 after winning the Group III state championship with a 3–2 win against runner-up North Plainfield High School in the finals of the tournament.

The boys' wrestling team won the North I Group III state sectional championship in 1985 and the North I Group II title in 2008

The girls' volleyball team won the Group II state championship in 1987 (against runner-up Hawthorne High School in the final match of the playoffs), 1993 (vs. Dumont High School), 1998 (vs. Westwood Regional High School), 2011 (vs. Sterling High School), 2014 (vs. Ramapo High School), 2015 (vs. Northern Valley Regional High School at Demarest) and 2017 (vs. NV Demarest). The program's seven state group titles are tied for seventh-most in the state.

The 1994 softball team finished the season with a record of 29-4 after winning the Group II state championship by defeating Clearview Regional High School by a score of 9–2 in the playoff finals.

The field hockey team won the North I Group III state sectional title in 1995.

The girls' soccer team finished the season with a record of 21-2-1, winning the BCSL championship, the 2006 North I, Group II state sectional title and defeated Haddonfield Memorial High School by a score of 1–0 to win the Group II state championship in the team's first ever finals.

The girls' basketball team won the 2007 North I, Group II state sectional championship, edging Pascack Hills High School 38–36 in the tournament final.

The school's cross country running program, has been led for many years by coach Bill Keith. The girls team has won two Bergen County Group Championships (1983-Group III, 1985-Group II) and two league titles (1984-NBIL, 2000-BCSL American). The boys team won the Bergen 2 title in 1987 and captured the Bergen Group III Championship in 1999, 2000, and 2002, with the school's lone state sectional title coming in 1999. The team also dominated the BCSL American Division in the 2000s, with titles in '00, '02, '03, and '05. The boys team had 17 consecutive dual meet wins in the 1999 and 2000 seasons, and in 2000 recorded the lowest score in the league championship meet (30) in 35 years.

The girls' outdoor track and field team won the Group II state championship in 2013.

The girls track team won the indoor track Group II state championship in 2015 and 2016. The boys team won the Group II title in 2016.

The boys track team won the Group III spring / outdoor track state championship in 2015 and the Group II title in 2016.

The school instituted a random drug testing program for all students participating in any and all extra curricular activities and/or sports. River Dell was one of three schools in New Jersey that received a grant of $43,100 in 2008 from the Office of National Drug Control Policy towards the cost of operating the program, which detected two students with drugs in their system and another student who had been using alcohol among the 77 students test in the 2007–08 school year.

=== Clubs ===
River Dell offers 47 extracurricular clubs ranging from Dance to Marching Band to Media Club to Debate. Its Chemistry Olympics A and B teams placed 11th and 9th in 2009.

River Dell is noted for its yearly play and musical. River Dell has put on its own rendition of the Greek Mythology Olympiaganza and the musical Willy Wonka. In previous years, River Dell has put on performances of Grease, The Wiz, Beauty and the Beast, High School Musical, Into the Woods and Guys and Dolls. More recent production include "The Addams Family", "Chicago", and the 2021 musical "Mamma Mia!". Students are placed based on auditions.

River Dell select choir, currently under the direction of Jeffery Wilson, has been frequently adjudicated and has won numerous awards, including gold awards at the New York Choral Festival in 2003, 2007, 2008, and 2010. Three of those festivals were located in Alice Tully Hall at Lincoln Center and the other was in Carnegie Hall. Every year, the choir features members who participate in Bergen County, all-region, all state, and all-Eastern chorus.

The River Dell Marching Band (RDMB) is currently under supervision of Michael O'Reilly. In past years, the band has performed the music of Fusion: The Music of Cirque du Soleil, Steely Dan, Sound's of Santana, James Brown, the Who, and the Nightmare Before Christmas. The band has earned two first-place finishes, while capturing several caption awards including three best percussion awards. The band plays in various parades and festivals throughout the country. The band's more previous shows have included "Little Shop of Horrors", "Espionage" and "Carnival '19". The 2020-2021 program is "The Best of RDMB" featuring music from past shows such as "Tommy", "Espionage", and "Little Shop of Horrors".

On January 31, 2009, River Dell's Academic Decathlon team took 3rd in New Jersey's region II, advancing to New Jersey's State Academic Decathlon, a feat which has not been achieved since the 2001–02 school year. They repeated this feat again in 2010.

== Administration ==
The school's principal is Brian Pepe. His core administration team includes two assistant principals.

== Notable alumni ==
- Joanna Angel (born 1980), alternative adult film actress
- Ginny Capicchioni, lacrosse goaltender who was the first woman to compete in the National Lacrosse League
- Frank Capsouras (born 1947), weightlifter who represented the United States in the men's heavyweight event at the 1972 Summer Olympics
- Joe DiPietro (born 1961), playwright, lyricist and author
- Jack "CourageJD" Dunlop (born 1994), YouTuber, commentator and streamer, who is a content creator for and co-owner of 100 Thieves
- Paul J. Fishman (born 1957, class of 1974), United States Attorney for the District of New Jersey
- Steve Goepel (born 1949), former football player and coach
- Louise Gonnerman (born 1947), former professional tennis player
- Bill Parcells (born 1941), former NFL Head Coach of the New York Giants, New England Patriots, New York Jets, and Dallas Cowboys and Executive Vice President of Football Operations for the Miami Dolphins
- Billy Paultz (born 1948), former ABA and NBA player for 13 seasons, who played for five of those seasons with the New York Nets
