= Oakland Public Schools =

School district in Bergen County, New Jersey, US

Address
- 315 Ramapo Valley Road Oakland, Bergen County, New Jersey, 07436; United States
- Coordinates: 41.022556°N 74.244461°W

District information
- Grades: PreK-8
- Superintendent: Gina M. Coffaro
- Business administrator: Annette Wells
- Schools: 4

Students and staff
- Enrollment: 1,348 (as of 2023–24)
- Faculty: 131.3 FTEs
- Student–teacher ratio: 10.3:1

Other information
- District Factor Group: I
- Website: www.oaklandschoolsnj.org
Ind.	Per pupil	District spending	Rank (*)	K-8 average	%± vs. average
1A	Total Spending	$17,865	54	$18,891	−5.4%
1	Budgetary Cost	14,809	60	14,159	4.6%
2	Classroom Instruction	8,796	51	8,659	1.6%
6	Support Services	2,507	67	2,167	15.7%
8	Administrative Cost	1,957	79	1,547	26.5%
10	Operations & Maintenance	1,440	33	1,612	−10.7%
13	Extracurricular Activities	74	27	104	−28.8%
16	Median Teacher Salary	68,439	75	61,136
Data from NJDoE 2014 Taxpayers' Guide to Education Spending. *Of K-8 districts with more than 750 students. Lowest spending=1; Highest=84

The Oakland Public Schools is a comprehensive community public school district serving students in pre-kindergarten through eighth grade from the borough of Oakland in Bergen County, in the U.S. state of New Jersey.

As of the 2023–24 school year, the district, comprising four schools, had an enrollment of 1,348 students and 131.3 classroom teachers (on an FTE basis), for a student–teacher ratio of 10.3:1.

Students in ninth through twelfth grades for public school attend the schools of the Ramapo Indian Hills Regional High School District, a regional district serving students from Franklin Lakes, Oakland and Wyckoff. Before enrolling, students have the option to choose to attend either of the district's high schools. Schools in the high school district (with 2023–24 enrollment data from the National Center for Education Statistics) are Indian Hills High School, located in Oakland with 694 students and Ramapo High School, located in Franklin Lakes with 1,188 students.

== History ==
In 1954, Oakland, which had sent its students to Pompton Lakes High School, joined an effort to create a regional high school together with Franklin Lakes and Wyckoff, which had been notified in 1954 that students from those two communities at Ramsey High School beyond the 1956-57 school year. The creation of a regional high school was approved in 1954 by all three communities by a margin of 1,060 to 51.

The district had been classified by the New Jersey Department of Education as being in District Factor Group "I", the second-highest of eight groupings. District Factor Groups organize districts statewide to allow comparison by common socioeconomic characteristics of the local districts. From lowest socioeconomic status to highest, the categories are A, B, CD, DE, FG, GH, I and J.

== Schools ==
Schools in the district (with 2023–24 enrollment data from the National Center for Education Statistics) are:

Elementary schools

- Dogwood Hill Elementary School with 241 students in grades K-5
  - Sean Bowe, principal
- Heights Elementary School with 376 students in grades PreK-5
  - Jacqueline Micari-Christiano, principal
- Manito Elementary School with 257 students in grades K-5
  - Adam I. Silverstein, principal

Middle school

- Valley Middle School with 446 students in grades 6-8
  - Gregg J. Desiderio, principal

== Administration ==
Core members of the district's administration are:

- Gina M. Coffaro, superintendent of schools
- Annette Wells, school business administrator and board secretary

== Board of education ==
The district's board of education, consisting of five members, sets policy and oversees the fiscal and educational operation of the district through its administration. As a Type II school district, the board's trustees are elected directly by voters to serve three-year terms of office on a staggered basis, with either one or two seats up for election each year held as part of the April school election. The board appoints a superintendent to oversee the district's day-to-day operations and a business administrator to supervise the business functions of the district. As one of about a dozen districts statewide with school elections in April, voters also decide on passage of the annual school budget.
