= Oakland, New Jersey =

Borough in Bergen County, New Jersey, US

- Borough
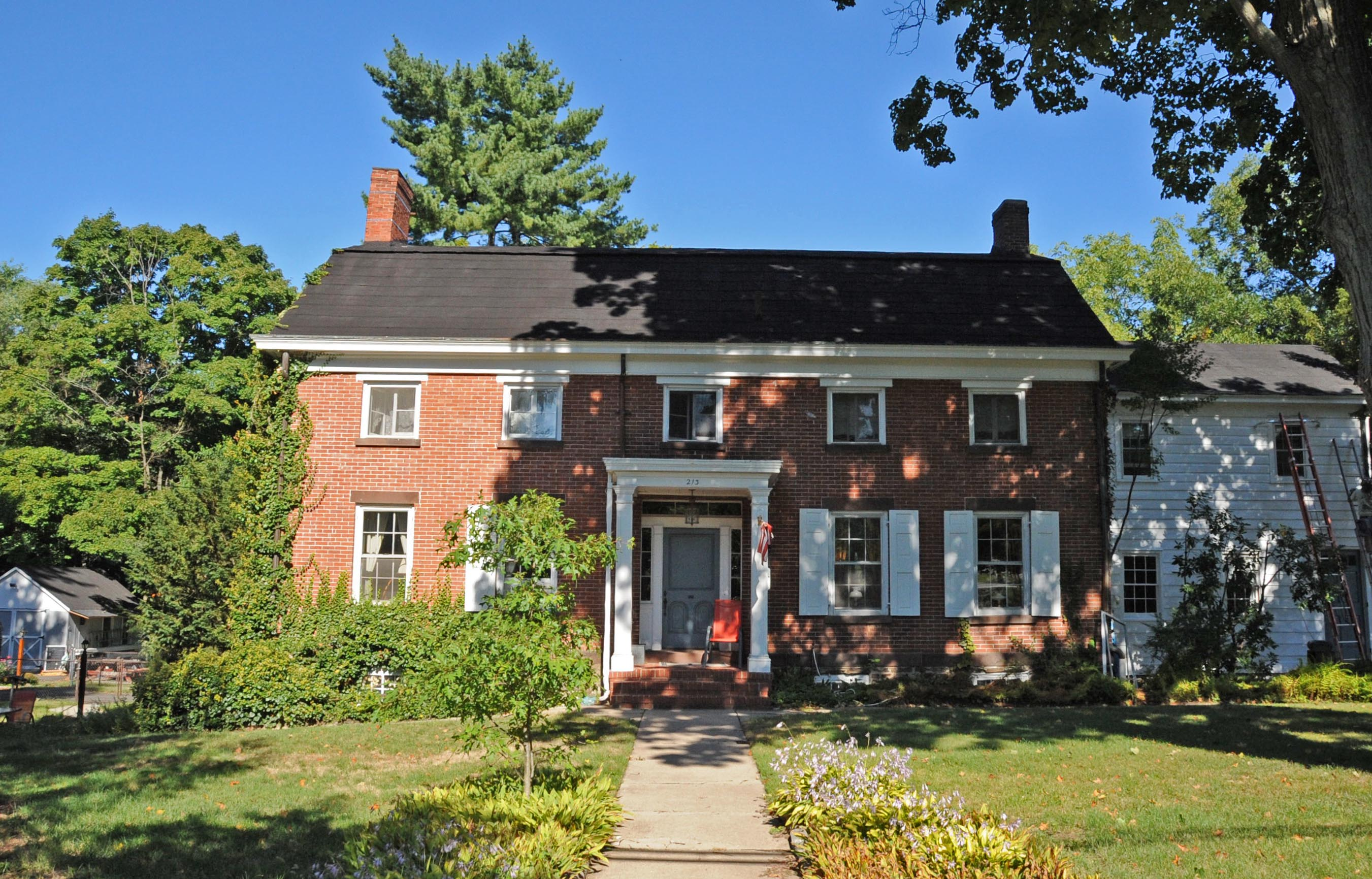
- Demarest House

- Seal

- Location of Oakland in Bergen County highlighted in red (left). Inset map: Location of Bergen County in New Jersey highlighted in orange (right).

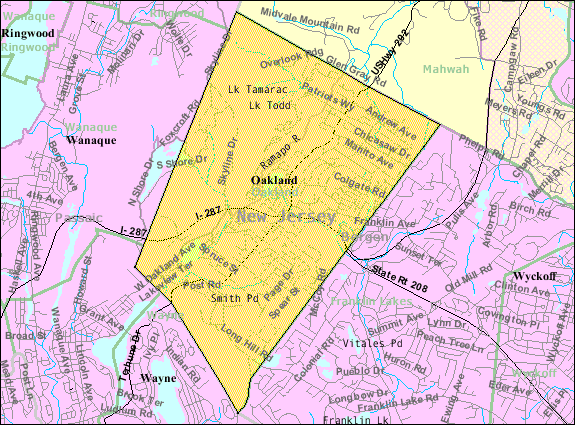
- Census Bureau map of Oakland, New Jersey

- Location in Bergen County Location in New Jersey Location in the United States
- Coordinates: 41.031022°N 74.240502°W
- Country: United States
- State: New Jersey
- County: Bergen
- Incorporated: April 8, 1902

Government
  - Type: Borough
  - Body: Borough Council
  - Mayor: Eric Kulmala (R, term ends December 31, 2027)
  - Administrator: Richard Kunze
  - Municipal clerk: Wendi Seelin (acting)

Area
  - Total: 8.77 sq mi (22.71 km^{2})
  - Land: 8.50 sq mi (22.02 km^{2})
  - Water: 0.27 sq mi (0.69 km^{2}) 3.06%
  - Rank: 223rd of 565 in state 5th of 70 in county
- Elevation: 233 ft (71 m)

Population (2020)
  - Total: 12,748
  - Estimate (2023): 12,680
  - Rank: 200th of 565 in state 27th of 70 in county
  - Density: 1,499.4/sq mi (578.9/km^{2})
  - Rank: 335th of 565 in state 64th of 70 in county
- Time zone: UTC−05:00 (Eastern (EST))
  - Summer (DST): UTC−04:00 (Eastern (EDT))
- ZIP Code: 07436
- Area code: 201
- FIPS code: 3400353850
- GNIS feature ID: 0885330
- Website: www.oakland-nj.org

Oakland is a borough in Bergen County, in the U.S. state of New Jersey and a suburb of New York City. As of the 2020 United States census, the borough's population was 12,748, a decrease of six people from the 2010 census count of 12,754, which in turn reflected an increase of 288 (+2.3%) from the 12,466 counted in the 2000 census.

Oakland was incorporated as a borough by an act of the New Jersey Legislature on April 8, 1902, from portions of Franklin Township (now Wyckoff). The name comes from the white oak trees in the area.

== History ==
The Van Allen House was built in 1748 and was a stop for George Washington and his troops in 1777.

From the 1940s through the end of the 1960s a summer bungalow colony was developed in a valley in West Oakland on the Ramapo River. This was a refuge for a close-knit group of several score families from the summer heat of New York City and urban New Jersey. During the summer months, the New York, Susquehanna and Western Railroad provided service at a West Oakland passenger station. This colony was located on the road between Oakland and Pompton Lakes, near a training camp for boxers. In the early morning, a resident could see Joe Louis or Sugar Ray Robinson, among others, running past the summer homes. One of these resorts was called Pleasureland and had pools and slides, including a concert venue for bands. It was popular in the 1980s until August 4th 1985 when a bus tour from NYC came to celebrate Jamaican Independence day and there was a shootout. The resort was then incorporated into the Great Oak Park with trails for residents.

One section of streets in the town are named after Native American tribes and Native American first names. Now considered politically incorrect, the borough had a wooden sign posted downtown that read "Once there was [sic] Indians all over this place" which had been donated by a resident who insisted on the wording of the sign as having been a quotation from an author.

== Geography ==
According to the United States Census Bureau, the borough had a total area of 8.77 square miles (22.71 km^{2}), including 8.50 square miles (22.02 km^{2}) of land and 0.27 square miles (0.69 km^{2}) of water (3.06%).

Unincorporated communities, localities and place names located partially or completely within the borough include Ramapo Lake and Rotten Pond.

The borough borders Franklin Lakes and Mahwah in Bergen County; and Pompton Lakes, Ringwood, Wanaque and Wayne in Passaic County.

== Demographics ==
Historical population
Census	Pop.	Note	%±
1900	479		—
1910	568		18.6%
1920	497		−12.5%
1930	735		47.9%
1940	932		26.8%
1950	1,817		95.0%
1960	9,446		419.9%
1970	14,420		52.7%
1980	13,443		−6.8%
1990	11,997		−10.8%
2000	12,466		3.9%
2010	12,754		2.3%
2020	12,748		0.0%
2023 (est.)	12,680	▼	−0.5%
Population sources: 1910–1920 1910; 1910–1930 1900–2020; 2000 2010 2020

=== Racial and ethnic composition ===
Oakland borough, New Jersey – Racial and ethnic composition Note: the US Census treats Hispanic/Latino as an ethnic category. This table excludes Latinos from the racial categories and assigns them to a separate category. Hispanics/Latinos may be of any race.
Race / Ethnicity (NH = Non-Hispanic)	Pop 2000	Pop 2010	Pop 2020	% 2000	% 2010	% 2020
White alone (NH)	11,441	11,273	10,370	91.78%	88.39%	81.35%
Black or African American alone (NH)	94	104	119	0.75%	0.82%	0.93%
Native American or Alaska Native alone (NH)	5	18	12	0.04%	0.14%	0.09%
Asian alone (NH)	335	532	605	2.69%	4.17%	4.75%
Native Hawaiian or Pacific Islander alone (NH)	1	1	1	0.01%	0.01%	0.01%
Other race alone (NH)	11	11	30	0.09%	0.09%	0.24%
Mixed race or Multiracial (NH)	96	134	401	0.77%	1.05%	3.15%
Hispanic or Latino (any race)	483	681	1,210	3.87%	5.34%	9.49%
Total	12,466	12,754	12,748	100.00%	100.00%	100.00%

=== 2020 census ===
As of the 2020 census, Oakland had a population of 12,748. The median age was 43.8 years. 21.9% of residents were under the age of 18 and 17.0% of residents were 65 years of age or older. For every 100 females there were 96.0 males, and for every 100 females age 18 and over there were 94.7 males age 18 and over.

99.6% of residents lived in urban areas, while 0.4% lived in rural areas.

There were 4,356 households in Oakland, of which 36.5% had children under the age of 18 living in them. Of all households, 68.5% were married-couple households, 10.7% were households with a male householder and no spouse or partner present, and 17.4% were households with a female householder and no spouse or partner present. About 15.7% of all households were made up of individuals and 7.8% had someone living alone who was 65 years of age or older.

There were 4,561 housing units, of which 4.5% were vacant. The homeowner vacancy rate was 1.2% and the rental vacancy rate was 3.7%.

=== 2010 census ===
The 2010 United States census counted 12,754 people, 4,335 households, and 3,568 families in the borough. The population density was 1,508.6 per square mile (582.5/km^{2}). There were 4,470 housing units at an average density of 528.7 per square mile (204.1/km^{2}). The racial makeup was 92.71% (11,824) White, 0.89% (113) Black or African American, 0.19% (24) Native American, 4.17% (532) Asian, 0.01% (1) Pacific Islander, 0.49% (62) from other races, and 1.55% (198) from two or more races. Hispanic or Latino of any race were 5.34% (681) of the population.

Of the 4,335 households, 39.8% had children under the age of 18; 71.3% were married couples living together; 7.4% had a female householder with no husband present and 17.7% were non-families. Of all households, 14.3% were made up of individuals and 6.4% had someone living alone who was 65 years of age or older. The average household size was 2.89 and the average family size was 3.22.

26.0% of the population were under the age of 18, 5.9% from 18 to 24, 22.3% from 25 to 44, 31.6% from 45 to 64, and 14.2% who were 65 years of age or older. The median age was 42.8 years. For every 100 females, the population had 95.8 males. For every 100 females ages 18 and older there were 92.9 males.

The Census Bureau's 2006–2010 American Community Survey showed that (in 2010 inflation-adjusted dollars) median household income was $111,390 (with a margin of error of +/− $6,160) and the median family income was $114,973 (+/− $7,378). Males had a median income of $82,750 (+/− $6,931) versus $59,349 (+/− $7,903) for females. The per capita income for the borough was $43,651 (+/− $3,082). About 0.7% of families and 1.9% of the population were below the poverty line, including 1.7% of those under age 18 and 2.3% of those age 65 or over.

Same-sex couples headed 21 households in 2010, an increase from the 18 counted in 2000.

=== 2000 census ===
As of the 2000 United States census there were 12,466 people, 4,255 households, and 3,565 families residing in the borough. The population density was 1,448.9 inhabitants per square mile (559.4/km^{2}). There were 4,345 housing units at an average density of 505.0 per square mile (195.0/km^{2}). The racial makeup of the borough was 94.76% White, 0.78% African American, 0.06% Native American, 2.70% Asian, 0.01% Pacific Islander, 0.70% from other races, and 0.99% from two or more races. Hispanic or Latino of any race were 3.87% of the population.

There were 4,255 households, out of which 39.5% had children under the age of 18 living with them, 74.4% were married couples living together, 6.4% had a female householder with no husband present, and 16.2% were non-families. 12.8% of all households were made up of individuals, and 5.0% had someone living alone who was 65 years of age or older. The average household size was 2.88 and the average family size was 3.15.

In the borough the population was spread out, with 25.4% under the age of 18, 5.2% from 18 to 24, 30.9% from 25 to 44, 25.8% from 45 to 64, and 12.7% who were 65 years of age or older. The median age was 39 years. For every 100 females, there were 95.5 males. For every 100 females age 18 and over, there were 94.0 males.

The median income for a household in the borough was $86,629, and the median income for a family was $93,695. Males had a median income of $62,336 versus $41,092 for females. The per capita income for the borough was $35,252. About 0.9% of families and 1.7% of the population were below the poverty line, including 2.2% of those under age 18 and 2.3% of those age 65 or over.

== Economy ==
Oakland's downtown shopping area is along Ramapo Valley Road (U.S. Route 202), with the Copper Tree Mall being the borough's largest single retail establishment.

There are a few industrial parks in Oakland, the biggest of which is off Long Hill Road near the Franklin Lakes border. The Oakland-McBride Center is the home of Royle Systems Group and of Topcon Medical Systems's United States operations.

Russ Berrie and Company, Inc., once headquartered in Oakland, was a manufacturer of teddy bears and other gift products. The company, since renamed to Kid Brands, moved to Wayne and from there to East Rutherford and is now defunct.

== Parks and recreation ==
Recreation is run by an all-volunteer nine-member Recreation Commission. All members are appointed by the mayor for a five-year term. There are a number of municipal recreational facilities in Oakland. The largest is a recreational area located off Oak Street, known to residents simply as the "Rec Field," but formally known as the Alexander Potash Recreation Complex, which is home to nine baseball and softball fields, six tennis courts, a roller hockey rink, basketball courts, and other facilities.

New Jersey's Ramapo Mountain State Forest is located in Oakland and can be accessed from Skyline Drive just north of its interchange with Interstate 287.

Camp Tamarack, which was a year-round camp operated by the Boy Scouts of America from the late 1920s until the mid-1980s, sits abandoned off of Skyline Drive. The camp ceased all activities and was taken over by the Bergen County park system in 1998. Many of the structures in the camp have been torn down, but some remain standing. Oakland is the current location of the headquarters of the Northern New Jersey Council.

The Rec Field is home to the annual carnival and fireworks that take place during the summer.

Oakland offers a summer camp which runs for six weeks, as well as a "safety camp" for children entering kindergarten at Manito, Dogwood, or Heights.

Crystal Lake Beach Club is a private beach club open Memorial Day Weekend through Labor Day weekend; purchase of a membership is required to use the site's facilities.

Holiday Bowl, located on Spruce Street, provides a facility for the high school bowling team, hosts a local league, and rents lanes by the hour.

== Government ==
=== Local government ===
Oakland is governed under the borough form of New Jersey municipal government, which is used in 218 municipalities (of the 564) statewide, making it the most common form of government in New Jersey. The governing body is comprised of a mayor and a borough council, with all positions elected at large on a partisan basis during the November general election. A mayor is elected directly by the voters to a four-year term of office. The borough council includes six members elected to serve three-year terms on a staggered basis, with two seats coming up for election each year in a three-year cycle. The borough form of government used by Oakland is a "weak mayor / strong council" government in which council members act as the legislative body with the mayor presiding at meetings and voting only in the event of a tie. The mayor can veto ordinances subject to an override by a two-thirds majority vote of the council. The mayor makes committee and liaison assignments for council members, and most appointments are made by the mayor with the advice and consent of the council.

As of 2026, the mayor of the Borough of Oakland is Republican Eric Kulmala, whose term of office ends December 31, 2027. Members of the Oakland Borough Council are Council President Steve Saliani (R, 2027), William J. Eilert (I, 2028), Pat Pignatelli (R, 2026), Matthew Dumpert (I, 2028), Russ Talamini (R, 2026), and Carol M. Rose (R, 2027).

Eilert unseated the then-council incumbent John J. McCann, Jr., in the election in November 2025 - Dumpert, however, ended up tying another then-council incumbent, Kevin F. Slasinski, in that election, with each of them getting 2,515 total votes, following, first, Dumpert's campaign unsuccessfully appealing three votes in its favor getting thrown out, then, both candidates getting one vote removed from their respective initial vote totals; that would lead to multiple hearings in state Superior Court, eventually leading to a special "do-over" election also contested by Dumpert and Slasinski, which Dumpert would end up winning overwhelmingly, 1,888-770 (71%-29%).

In February 2021, the borough council selected Kevin Slasinksi from a list of three candidates nominated by the Republican municipal committee to fill the vacant seat expiring in December 2022 that had been held by Robert Knapp until he resigned from office the previous month.

==== Emergency services ====
The Oakland Fire Department is an all-volunteer squad established in 1909 that came under the supervision of the borough in 1911. There are three firehouses in Oakland. The central station is located on Yawpo Avenue just off Ramapo Valley Road in downtown Oakland.

There is one police station and it is located on Ramapo Valley Road across from the intersection with Walnut Street.

=== Federal, state, and county representation ===
Oakland is located in the 9th Congressional District and is part of New Jersey's 39th state legislative district.

Prior to the 2011 reapportionment following the 2010 census, Oakland had been in the 40th state legislative district. In redistricting following the 2010 census, the borough was in the 5th congressional district, which was in effect from 2013 to 2022.

For the 119th United States Congress, New Jersey's 9th congressional district is represented by Nellie Pou (D, North Haledon) New Jersey is represented in the United States Senate by Democrats Cory Booker (Newark, term ends 2027) and Andy Kim (Moorestown, term ends 2031).

For the 2026–2027 session, the 39th legislative district of the New Jersey Legislature is represented in the State Senate by Holly Schepisi (R, River Vale) and in the General Assembly by Robert Auth (R, Old Tappan) and John V. Azzariti (R, Saddle River).

Bergen County is governed by a directly elected County Executive, with legislative functions performed by a Board of County Commissioners comprised of seven members who are elected at-large to three-year terms in partisan elections on a staggered basis, with either two or three seats coming up for election each November; a Chairman and Vice Chairman are selected from among its seven members at a reorganization meeting held every January. As of 2025, the county executive is James J. Tedesco III (D, Paramus), whose four-year term of office ends December 31, 2026.

Bergen County's Commissioners are Chair Mary J. Amoroso (D, Mahwah, 2025), Vice Chair Steven A. Tanelli (D, North Arlington, 2027), Chair Pro Tem Joan Voss (D, Fort Lee, 2026), Rafael Marte (D, Bergenfield, 2026), Germaine M. Ortiz (D, Emerson, 2025), Thomas J. Sullivan Jr. (D, Montvale, 2025) and Tracy Silna Zur (D, Franklin Lakes, 2027).

Bergen County's elected constitutional officials are Clerk John S. Hogan (D, Northvale, 2026), Sheriff Anthony Cureton (D, Englewood, 2027) and Surrogate Michael R. Dressler (D, Cresskill, 2026).

=== Highlands protection ===
In 2004, the New Jersey Legislature passed the Highlands Water Protection and Planning Act, which regulates the New Jersey Highlands region. Oakland was included in the highlands preservation area and is subject to the rules of the act and the Highlands Water Protection and Planning Council, a division of the New Jersey Department of Environmental Protection. Some of the territory in the protected region is classified as being in the highlands preservation area, and thus subject to additional rules.

=== Politics ===
United States presidential election results for Oakland 2024 2020 2016 2012 2008 2004
Year	Republican		Democratic		Third party(ies)	
Year	No.	%	No.	%	No.	%
2024	4,324	54.80%	3,449	43.71%	117	1.48%
2020	4,271	51.02%	3,988	47.64%	112	1.34%
2016	3,727	54.25%	2,872	41.80%	271	3.94%
2012	3,631	55.38%	2,845	43.40%	80	1.22%
2008	3,900	55.38%	3,082	43.77%	60	0.85%
2004	3,938	57.51%	2,864	41.82%	46	0.67%

As of March 2011, there were a total of 8,542 registered voters in Oakland, of which 1,718 (20.1% vs. 31.7% countywide) were registered as Democrats, 2,700 (31.6% vs. 21.1%) were registered as Republicans and 4,116 (48.2% vs. 47.1%) were registered as Unaffiliated. There were 8 voters registered as Libertarians or Greens. Among the borough's 2010 Census population, 67.0% (vs. 57.1% in Bergen County) were registered to vote, including 90.5% of those ages 18 and over (vs. 73.7% countywide).

In the 2016 presidential election, Republican Donald Trump received 3,727 votes (53.7% vs. 41.1% countywide), ahead of Democrat Hillary Clinton with 2,872 votes (41.4% vs. 54.2%) and other candidates with 336 votes (4.8% vs. 4.6%), among the 7,013 ballots cast by the borough's 9,233 registered voters, for a turnout of 76.0% (vs. 72.5% in Bergen County). In the 2012 presidential election, Republican Mitt Romney received 3,631 votes (55.4% vs. 43.5% countywide), ahead of Democrat Barack Obama with 2,845 votes (43.4% vs. 54.8%) and other candidates with 80 votes (1.2% vs. 0.9%), among the 6,555 ballots cast by the borough's 8,952 registered voters, for a turnout of 73.2% (vs. 70.4% in Bergen County). In the 2008 presidential election, Republican John McCain received 3,900 votes (54.9% vs. 44.5% countywide), ahead of Democrat Barack Obama with 3,082 votes (43.4% vs. 53.9%) and other candidates with 60 votes (0.8% vs. 0.8%), among the 7,106 ballots cast by the borough's 8,974 registered voters, for a turnout of 79.2% (vs. 76.8% in Bergen County).

Gubernatorial election results for Oakland
Year	Republican		Democratic		Third party(ies)	
Year	No.	%	No.	%	No.	%
2025	3,280	52.15%	2,983	47.42%	27	0.43%
2021	3,072	57.49%	2,238	41.88%	34	0.64%
2017	1,889	50.96%	1,745	47.07%	73	1.97%
2013	2,746	67.47%	1,275	31.33%	49	1.20%
2009	2,553	54.74%	1,776	38.08%	335	7.18%
2005	2,476	53.41%	2,018	43.53%	142	3.06%

In the 2013 gubernatorial election, Republican Chris Christie received 67.5% of the vote (2,746 cast), ahead of Democrat Barbara Buono with 31.3% (1,275 votes), and other candidates with 1.2% (49 votes), among the 4,129 ballots cast by the borough's 8,623 registered voters (59 ballots were spoiled), for a turnout of 47.9%. In the 2009 gubernatorial election, Republican Chris Christie received 2,553 votes (54.3% vs. 45.8% countywide), ahead of Democrat Jon Corzine with 1,776 votes (37.8% vs. 48.0%), Independent Chris Daggett with 312 votes (6.6% vs. 4.7%) and other candidates with 23 votes (0.5% vs. 0.5%), among the 4,702 ballots cast by the borough's 8,782 registered voters, yielding a 53.5% turnout (vs. 50.0% in the county).

United States Senate election results for Oakland1
Year	Republican		Democratic		Third party(ies)	
Year	No.	%	No.	%	No.	%
2024	4,100	54.92%	3,244	43.45%	122	1.63%
2018	2,849	56.44%	2,045	40.51%	154	3.05%
2012	3,192	53.26%	2,704	45.12%	97	1.62%
2006	2,591	57.64%	1,852	41.20%	52	1.16%

United States Senate election results for Oakland2
Year	Republican		Democratic		Third party(ies)	
Year	No.	%	No.	%	No.	%
2020	4,211	51.54%	3,841	47.01%	118	1.44%
2014	1,865	53.62%	1,564	44.97%	49	1.41%
2013	1,421	55.79%	1,117	43.86%	9	0.35%
2008	3,504	54.05%	2,899	44.72%	80	1.23%

== Education ==
Public school students in pre-kindergarten through eighth grade attend the Oakland Public Schools. As of the 2023–24 school year, the district, comprised of four schools, had an enrollment of 1,348 students and 131.3 classroom teachers (on an FTE basis), for a student–teacher ratio of 10.3:1. Schools in the district (with 2023–24 enrollment data from the National Center for Education Statistics) are Dogwood Hill Elementary School with 241 students in grades K-5, Heights Elementary School with 376 students in grades PreK-5, Manito Elementary School with 257 students in grades K-5 and Valley Middle School with 446 students in grades 6-8.

Students in ninth through twelfth grades for public school attend the schools of the Ramapo Indian Hills Regional High School District, a regional district serving students from Franklin Lakes, Oakland and Wyckoff. Before enrolling, students have the option to choose to attend either of the district's high schools. Schools in the high school district (with 2023–24 enrollment data from the National Center for Education Statistics) are Indian Hills High School, located in Oakland with 694 students and Ramapo High School, located in Franklin Lakes with 1,188 students. The district's nine-member board of education oversees the operation of the district; seats on the board are allocated based on population, with three of the nine seats allocated to Oakland. Franklin Lakes, Oakland and Wyckoff (FLOW district) approved the creation of a regional high school in 1954. Ramapo High School in Franklin Lakes opened in 1957 and Indian Hills High School in Oakland opened in 1965.

Public school students from the borough, and all of Bergen County, are eligible to attend the secondary education programs offered by the Bergen County Technical Schools, which include the Bergen County Academies in Hackensack, and the Bergen Tech campus in Teterboro or Paramus. The district offers programs on a shared-time or full-time basis, with admission based on a selective application process and tuition covered by the student's home school district.

Private schools include Barnstable Academy, a college preparatory school for students in fifth through twelfth grades located in a business and industrial park off Long Hill Road; The New Jersey Japanese School, which serves Japanese expatriates to prepare them for the Japanese educational system when the students eventually return to Japan, located next to Our Lady of Perpetual Help Church; and the Gerrard Berman Day School (Solomon Schechter of North Jersey), a Jewish day school for students in preschool through eighth grade, located on Spruce Street.

== Awards ==
In 2007, Oakland was ranked 43rd by Business Week on its list of "Great Places to Raise Kids—for Less", with only two places in New Jersey ranked higher than Oakland: Matawan (12th) and Echelon a neighborhood near Philadelphia (4th). The criteria were test scores in math and reading, number of schools, cost of living, recreational and cultural activities, and risk of crime.

In 2013, Oakland was ranked by New Jersey Monthly as #1 for Young Families: "...Oakland is woodsy and a bit remote, but its midsize homes, good schools and low crime rate make it popular with young families."

== Transportation ==
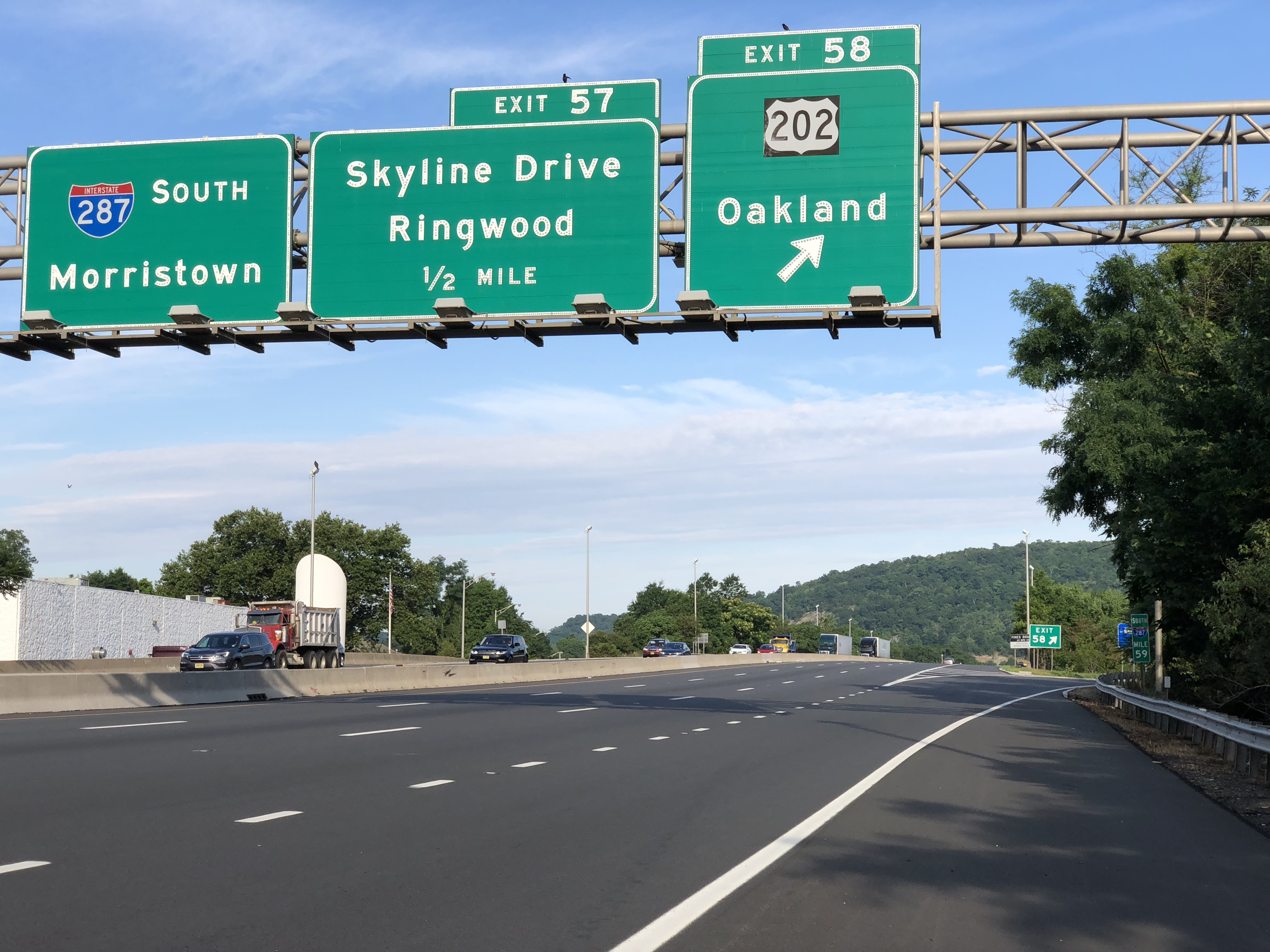
Interstate 287 southbound in Oakland

=== Roads and highways ===
As of May 2010, Oakland had a total of 67.62 miles (108.82 km) of roadways, of which 54.95 miles (88.43 km) were maintained by the borough, 9.45 miles (15.21 km) by Bergen County and 3.22 miles (5.18 km) by the New Jersey Department of Transportation.

Major roads through Oakland include Interstate 287 (including exits 57 and 58), Route 208 and U.S. Route 202.

=== Public transportation ===
Commuter bus service to the Port Authority Bus Terminal in New York City is available from Coach USA via Short Line.

NJ Transit bus service is also available on a limited basis via the 752 route between Oakland and Hackensack via Ridgewood.

A freight rail line, the New York, Susquehanna and Western Railway, runs through Oakland. Commuter rail service ended in 1966.

Newark Liberty International Airport provides scheduled air service.

Oakland's railroad stations

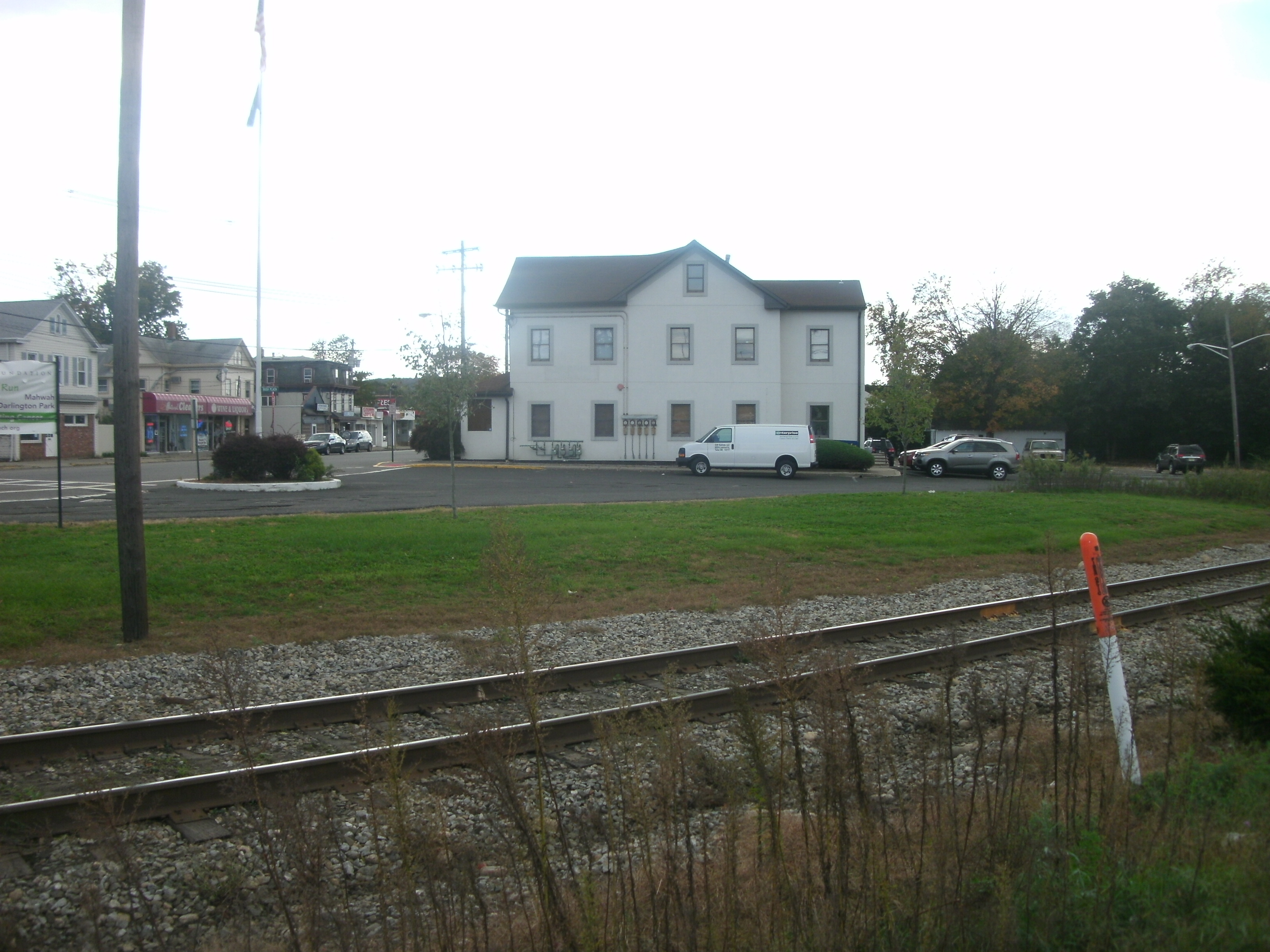
The patch of grass representing the former Oakland station, which was demolished in 1999, as viewed in October 2011

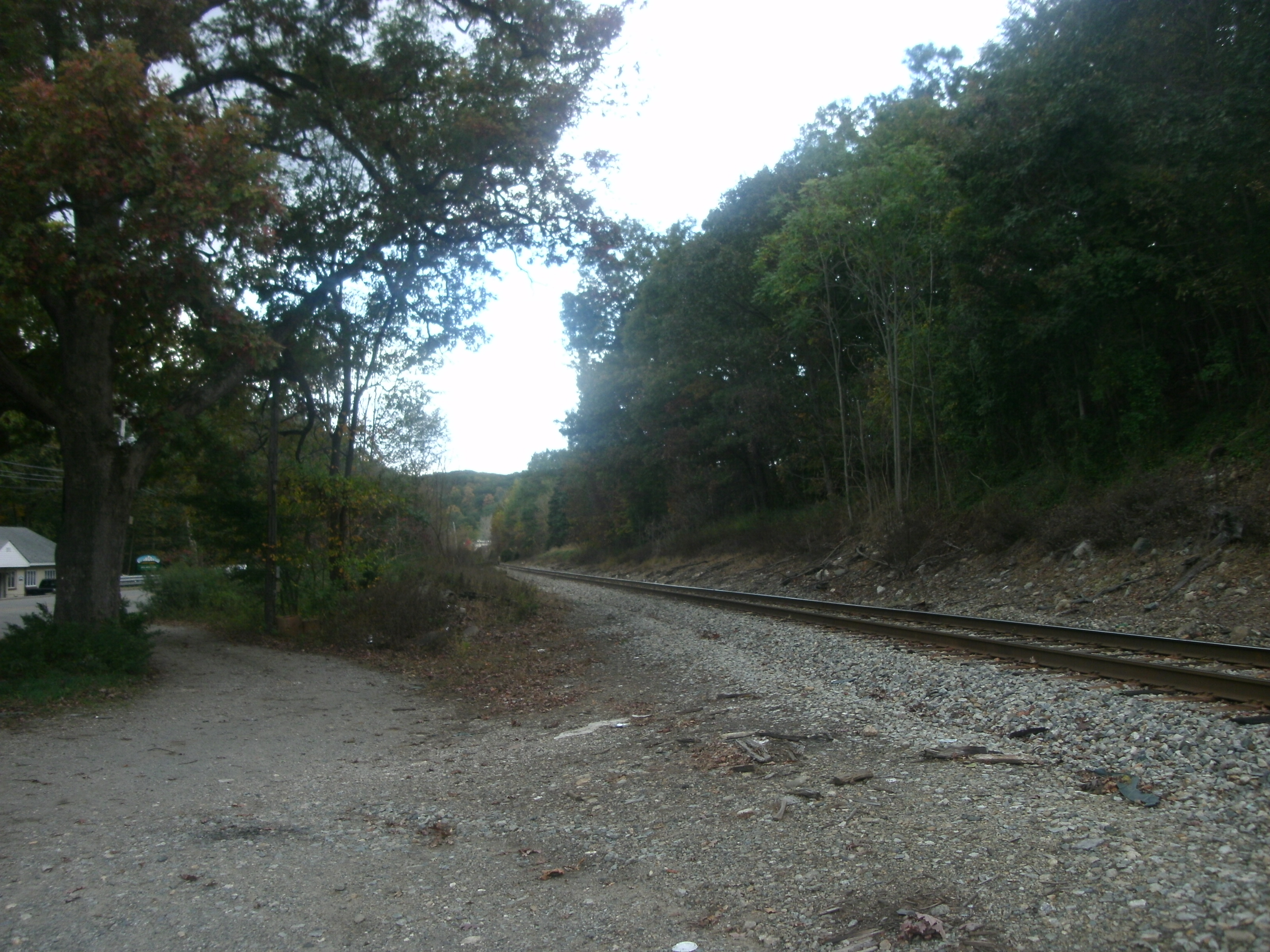
The former West Oakland station site, as viewed in October 2011, 45 years after station service ended.

=== Earlier railroad ===
A rail right-of-way was built by the New Jersey Midland Railway around 1870 and later served passengers on the New York, Susquehanna and Western Railroad (NYS&W). until service was abruptly curtailed in 1966. Plans to restore service have not materialized. The borough is a stop on the annual Toys for Tots train.

== Media ==
WVNJ AM-1160 is licensed to Oakland. Oakland Patch provides hyperlocal content about news and events in Oakland, as part of the Patch Media network. The Franklin Lakes / Oakland Suburban News is published weekly, with additional news available online in conjunction with The Record. The Oakland Journal is an online hyper-local news source that covers local political, civic and social events. The borough also has its own Communications Commission which publishes a monthly e-newsletter and operates its own local access television channel, Oakland TV (airing on optimum Channel 77, which can be seen within the borough and also on Verizon fios Channel 45, which can be seen throughout western Bergen County) among other responsibilities.

== Notable people ==
People who were born in, residents of, or otherwise closely associated with Oakland include:

- Jonathan Ames (born 1964), writer, artist, actor who created HBO's Bored to Death
- Roger Nash Baldwin (1884–1981), one of the founders of the American Civil Liberties Union
- Ali Brustofski (born 1993), singer-songwriter who was a finalist on The CW TV network's singing show, The Next: Fame Is at Your Doorstep
- Cindy Callaghan (born c. 1976), author of children's books whose first book, Just Add Magic, was adapted into an Amazon television series by the same name
- Neil Cole (1926–2016), stock car racing driver who competed in 19 NASCAR Grand National events between 1950 and 1953
- DeAnne DeFuccio (born 1973), politician who has represented the 39th district in the New Jersey General Assembly since 2021.
- Louis DiGiaimo (1938–2015), casting director and film producer
- W. Cary Edwards (1943–2010), politician who served as New Jersey Attorney General from 1986 until 1989
- Madge Evans (1909–1981), stage and film actress
- Scott Frank (born 1958), former professional boxer who fought and lost to World Boxing Council world heavyweight champion Larry Holmes
- Sidney Kingsley (1906–1995), dramatist who received the Pulitzer Prize for Drama for his play Men in White in 1934
- Karen McCullah (born 1967), screenwriter and novelist
- Doug McKeon (born 1966), actor, director and screenwriter who appeared in the television series The Edge of Night and the films Uncle Joe Shannon and On Golden Pond
- Peter "Produce Pete" Napolitano (born 1945), grocer known for his television news produce segments and as a spokesman for the Pathmark supermarket chain
- Mike Teel (born 1986), football quarterback
- Valentin Turchin (1931–2010), Soviet-American cybernetician and computer scientist
- Lawrence Tynes (born 1978), placekicker who played for the New York Giants
- Arthur Vervaet (1913–1999), politician who served four terms in the New Jersey General Assembly and was mayor of Oakland for two years

== Sources ==
- Municipal Incorporations of the State of New Jersey (according to Counties) prepared by the Division of Local Government, Department of the Treasury (New Jersey); December 1, 1958.
- Clayton, W. Woodford; and Nelson, William. History of Bergen and Passaic Counties, New Jersey, with Biographical Sketches of Many of its Pioneers and Prominent Men., Philadelphia: Everts and Peck, 1882.
- Harvey, Cornelius Burnham (ed.), Genealogical History of Hudson and Bergen Counties, New Jersey. New York: New Jersey Genealogical Publishing Co., 1900.
- Van Valen, James M. History of Bergen County, New Jersey. New York: New Jersey Publishing and Engraving Co., 1900.
- Westervelt, Frances A. (Frances Augusta), 1858–1942, History of Bergen County, New Jersey, 1630–1923, Lewis Historical Publishing Company, 1923.
