= Jonathan Ames =

American author, columnist and showrunner (born 1964)

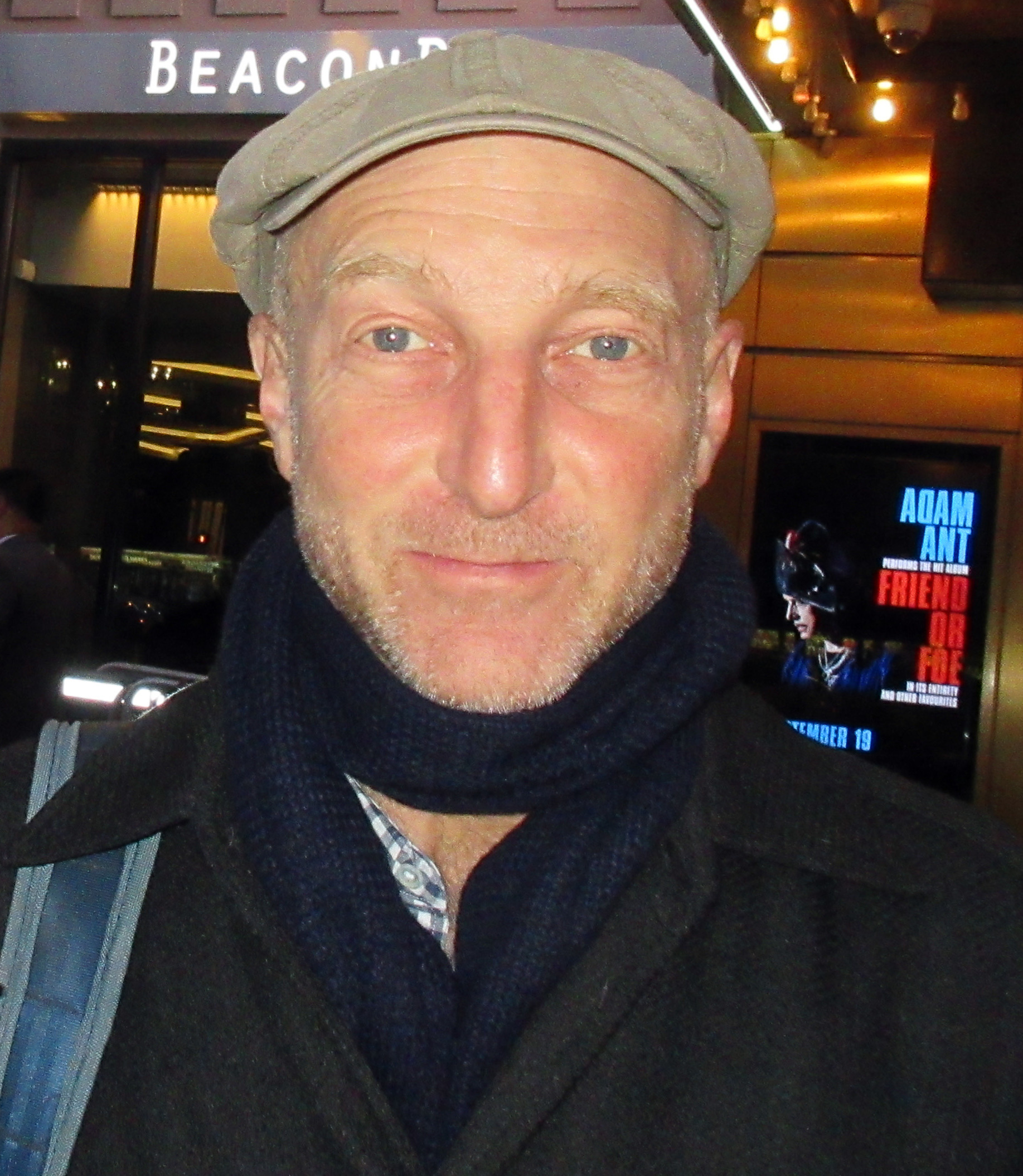
- Born: March 23, 1964 (age 62); New York City, U.S.
- Education: Indian Hills High School; Princeton University; Columbia University (MFA)
- Occupations: Novelist, television showrunner
- Children: 1
- Writing career
- Period: 1989–present
- Genres: Memoir, literary fiction, television comedy

Jonathan Ames (/eɪmz/; born March 23, 1964) is an American author who has written a number of novels and comic memoirs, and is the creator of two television series, Bored to Death (HBO) and Blunt Talk (Starz). In the late '90s and early 2000s, he was a columnist for the New York Press for several years, and became known for self-deprecating tales of his sexual misadventures. He also has a long-time interest in boxing, appearing occasionally in the ring as "The Herring Wonder".

Two of his novels have been adapted into films: The Extra Man in 2010, and You Were Never Really Here in 2017. Ames was a co-screenwriter of the former and an executive producer of the latter.

== Early life and education ==
Raised in Oakland, New Jersey, Ames is Jewish. He attended Indian Hills High School. Ames graduated with an English degree in 1987 from Princeton University, and where he authored his senior thesis entitled Eye Pity Eye: (The Collected Writings of Alexander Vine). He also holds a Master of Fine Arts degree in fiction from Columbia University. He has been an infrequent faculty member at Columbia, The New School, and the Iowa Writers' Workshop.

== Print ==
Ames's novels include I Pass Like Night (1989), The Extra Man (1998), and 2004's Wake Up Sir!, described by The New York Times as "laugh-out-loud funny". In September 2008, Ames released The Alcoholic, his first foray into graphic literature, illustrated by Dean Haspiel; an excerpt was included in The Best American Comics 2010. In 2009, he published a new collection of essays and fiction with Scribner, titled The Double Life Is Twice as Good. In 2018, Vintage released an expanded version of Ames's first thriller novel, You Were Never Really Here, which was originally published at Byliner as an e-book in 2013.

While at the New York Press, his columns were often recollections of his childhood neuroses and his unusual experiences, written in the gritty tradition of Charles Bukowski. These columns were collected in four nonfiction books, What's Not to Love?: The Adventures of a Mildly Perverted Young Writer (2000), My Less Than Secret Life (2002), I Love You More than You Know (2006), and The Double Life Is Twice As Good: Essays and Fiction (2009). Ames was also responsible for the Most Phallic Building contest which followed an article he wrote for Slate magazine where he claimed that the Williamsburg Bank Building in Brooklyn, New York, was the most phallic building he'd ever seen.

== Other media ==
Ames became known as a raconteur in New York City following his 1999 one-man stage show, "Oedipussy," and continues to perform frequently with the New York-based storytelling organization The Moth. He has also been a guest on the Late Show with David Letterman several times and played the lead role in the 2001 IFC film The Girl Under the Waves, an on-screen experiment in improvisational acting.

In 2004, Showtime commissioned Ames to develop a pilot based on his writings, titled What's Not to Love? Ames starred as himself, but it was not developed into a series, instead airing as a one time special in the winter of 2007–2008. Ames also appears in The Great Buck Howard, directed by Sean McGinly and starring John Malkovich, which debuted at Sundance in 2008.

Ames created the HBO series Bored to Death, which stars Jason Schwartzman as a struggling Brooklyn novelist named Jonathan Ames who moonlights as an unlicensed private detective. The show debuted on September 20, 2009. He also started to guest-star as Irwin during the second season, appearing fully nude in one scene. On December 20, 2011, it was reported that Bored to Death was cancelled by HBO after airing its third season.

The film adaptation of Ames's novel The Extra Man, starring Kevin Kline, John C. Reilly, Katie Holmes, and Paul Dano, was released in 2010.

The film adaptation of You Were Never Really Here was theatrically released in April 2018. The author produced the movie based on his book, which was directed by Lynne Ramsay. It premiered at the 70th Cannes Film Festival, where Ramsay won the award for Best Screenplay and Joaquin Phoenix won the award for Best Actor.

Ames has also appeared in HBO's Curb Your Enthusiasm in the Season 8 episode "Car Periscope," playing a brief role as Larry David's business manager.

In 2015, Ames teamed up with Patrick Stewart and Seth MacFarlane to create Blunt Talk, which aired on the STARZ network for two seasons. For his performance in the starring role, Patrick Stewart was nominated for a Golden Globe award for Best Actor in a Television Series Musical or Comedy and a Critics' Choice TV Award for Best Actor in a Comedy Series.

== Bibliography ==
=== Novels ===
- I Pass Like Night (1989)
- The Extra Man (1998)
- Wake Up, Sir! (2004)
- You Were Never Really Here (2013 and expanded version in 2018)
- A Past Without Pictures (2026)

==== Happy Doll series ====
- A Man Named Doll (2021)
- The Wheel of Doll (2022)
- Karma Doll (2025)

=== Essays ===
- What's Not to Love?: The Adventures of a Mildly Perverted Young Writer (2000)
- My Less Than Secret Life (2002)
- I Love You More Than You Know (2006)
- The Double Life Is Twice As Good: Essays and Fiction (2009)

=== Anthologies ===
- Sexual Metamorphosis: An Anthology of Transsexual Memoirs (2005)

=== Comics ===
- The Alcoholic, with Dean Haspiel (2008)

=== Television ===
- Bored to Death (creator/writer/producer, 2009–2011, as well as a cameo appearance as "Irwin")
- Blunt Talk (creator/writer/executive producer, 2015–2016)
- Drunk History (as Junius Booth, 2013)
