= Doug Most =

American journalist

Doug Most (born 1968) was the editor of The Boston Globe Magazine from October 2003 until April 2009. He was then promoted to a deputy Assistant Managing Editor post that puts him in charge of the paper's "soft" sections, including the magazine and the "g" section.

== Career ==
Most, who was born in Boston has worked for papers all along the east coast, including Bergen County's The Record. He graduated from George Washington University with a B.A. in Political Communication. He helped reinvent the Globe Magazine, giving it a glossier, more stylized look. He wrote a book about the Amy Grossberg-Brian Peterson baby-killing case, Always in Our Hearts (1999).

His book The Race Underground: Boston, New York, and the Incredible Rivalry That Built America’s First Subway was published in February 2014.

Most has taught journalism classes at Boston University, where he worked as executive editor and an assistant vice president.
