= Produce Pete =

American grocer (1945–2026)

- Born: Peter James Napolitano Jr. February 23, 1945; Englewood, New Jersey, U.S.
- Died: January 26, 2026 (aged 80); Paramus, New Jersey, U.S.
- Occupations: Grocer, chef, television personality

Peter James Napolitano Jr. (February 23, 1945 – January 26, 2026), better known by the stage name Produce Pete and sometimes referred to as Pete Your Produce Pal, was an American grocer, chef and celebrity spokesperson who was perhaps best known for his weekly fruit and vegetable segments which appeared on WNBC in New York City for 33 years and WCAU in Philadelphia.

== Early life ==
Napolitano was born into an Italian-American family in Englewood, New Jersey, on February 23, 1945, and was raised in Bergenfield. In 1953, as a young boy, he began selling fruits and vegetables at the neighborhood farmer's market which was owned by his family. In 1959, they opened a store, Napolitano's Produce, in Bergenfield.

== Career ==
In 1970, Napolitano took ownership of the family business. In 1997 he turned the business over to his son, Peter Charles Napolitano. Napolitano Produce closed in 2006 after serving the Bergen County, New Jersey, community for 53 years.

In the late 1980s, Napolitano was approached at his store by a WWOR-TV reporter who thought he'd be great at hosting a segment. He initially declined, but after the reporter persistently contacted him and his wife encouraged him, he accepted. He appeared on the station's program "People Are Talking" in which he discussed a current scare about Chilean grapes that had been tainted with cyanide and ate one on the air. He was hired in 1989. In the early 1990s, he began appearing on the WNBC-TV news program Weekend Today in New York. He hosted segments broadcast from the station's studio as well as from farms where the produce originated and the restaurants where it was served. He also had a segment on WCAU in Philadelphia. In 1994, he authored Produce Pete's Farmacopeia: From Apples to Zucchini, and Everything in Between, a book of recipes and tips pertaining to picking, buying, and cooking produce. In 2000, he also worked as a buyer for S. Katzman Produce at the Hunts Point Market in the Bronx, New York. He also taught cooking classes for Macy's and Bloomingdale's, among other chains. In 2023, he published the book They Call Me Produce Pete and in 2024, In the Kitchen with Bette & Produce Pete.

Napolitano's television segments were parodied by actor and comedian Steve Carell on The Daily Show with Jon Stewart.

== Personal life ==
Napolitano met his wife, Bette, when he was 16 years old and she was 14. In 1967 they married. Pete and Bette had two children and seven grandchildren. Bette frequently made appearances on Produce Pete segments. As of 2011, Napolitano was a resident of Oakland, New Jersey; at the time of his death he lived in North Haledon.

Napolitano died in Paramus, New Jersey, on January 26, 2026, at the age of 80.
