= Rob Milanese =

American football player (born 1980)

Profile
- Position: Wide receiver

Personal information
- Born: February 5, 1980 (age 46); Wyckoff, New Jersey, U.S.
- Listed height: 5 ft 9 in (1.75 m)
- Listed weight: 182 lb (83 kg)

Career information
- High school: Ramapo (Franklin Lakes, New Jersey)
- College: Penn (1999–2002)
- NFL draft: 2003: undrafted

Career history
- New England Patriots (2003)*; New York Jets (2004)*; → Frankfurt Galaxy (2004)*; Philadelphia Soul (2005); San Diego Chargers (2005)*; Philadelphia Soul (2006)
- * Offseason or practice squad member only
- Stats at ArenaFan.com

Rob Milanese (born February 25, 1980) is an American former professional football wide receiver/cornerback who played in the Arena Football League.

== Early life ==
Milanese grew up in Wyckoff, New Jersey, and attended Ramapo High School in Franklin Lakes where he was a standout in football and track. In football, he was a three-year letterman, and as a senior, he was the team captain, a first team All-County selection, and a third team All-State selection. In track, he helped lead his team to the League Championship and post an undefeated record as a senior.

== College career ==
Milanese attended the University of Pennsylvania, and finished his career with 259 receptions for 3,405 yards (13.147 yards per rec. avg.) and 21 touchdown receptions. Both his 259 receptions and 3,405 receiving yards are school records and his 21 touchdowns are the eighth best in Ivy League history. In his senior year, he became the first Penn player and was only the 15th Ivy League player to receive for 1,000 or more yards in a season. He was an All-Ivy League Honorable Mention as a freshman, a second team All-Ivy League selection as a sophomore and junior, and was a first team All-Ivy League selection as a senior.
