= Demarest House (Oakland, New Jersey) =

Historic house in New Jersey, United States

- U.S. National Register of Historic Places
- New Jersey Register of Historic Places
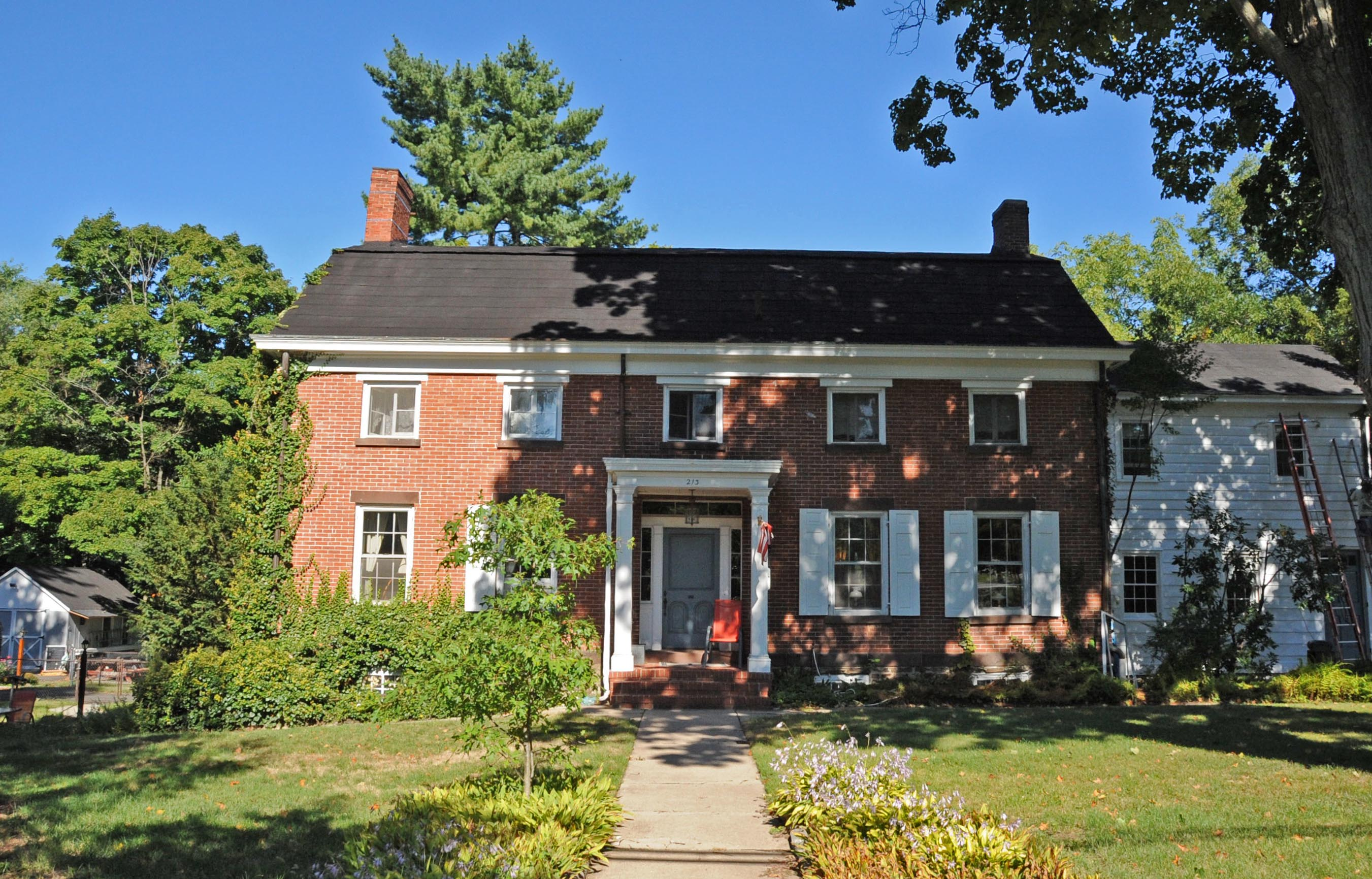

- Location within Bergen County, New Jersey Location within New Jersey Location within the United States
- Location: 213 Ramapo Valley Road, Oakland, New Jersey
- Coordinates: 41°1′4″N 74°15′1″W
- Area: 2.3 acres (0.93 ha)
- MPS: Stone Houses of Bergen County TR
- NRHP reference No.: 83001491
- NJRHP No.: 597

Significant dates
- Added to NRHP: January 10, 1983
- Designated NJRHP: October 3, 1980

The Demarest House is located at 213 Ramapo Valley Road in the borough of Oakland in Bergen County, New Jersey, United States. The historic stone house was added to the National Register of Historic Places on January 10, 1983, for its significance in architecture. It was listed as part of the Early Stone Houses of Bergen County Multiple Property Submission (MPS).

According to the nomination form, the house was built between 1770 and 1825 based on architectural evidence. The builder was probably Abraham Ackerman Demarest.

== See also ==
- National Register of Historic Places listings in Bergen County, New Jersey
