= Barnstable Academy =

Private school in Bergen County, New Jersey, United States

Location
- 8 Wright Way; Oakland, Bergen County, New Jersey 07436; United States
- 41.006690°N 74.245095°W

Information
- Type: Private
- Opened: 1978
- NCES School ID: 01933105
- Principal: Ashley Crowley
- Faculty: 24.1 FTEs
- Grades: 6th–12th
- Enrollment: 108 (as of 2023–24)
- Student to teacher ratio: 4.5:1
- Mascot: Bengal Tiger
- Accreditation: AdvancED
- Website: www.barnstableacademy.com

Barnstable Academy is a university preparatory private school serving students in sixth through twelfth grades in Oakland, New Jersey in Bergen County, in the U.S. state of New Jersey. The school was founded in 1978. The school is accredited by AdvancED.

As of the 2023–24 school year, the school had an enrollment of 108 students and 24.1 classroom teachers (on an FTE basis), for a student–teacher ratio of 4.5:1. The school's student body was 77.8% (84) White, 9.3% (10) Asian, 8.3% (9) two or more races, 3.7% (4) Black and 0.9% (1) Hispanic.
