= Amy Grossberg and Brian Peterson =

American convicted killers

Amy Grossberg and Brian Peterson infanticide case
- Location: Newark, Delaware, U.S.
- Date: November 12, 1996; 30 years ago
- Attack type: Child murder by head trauma, infanticide, filicide, neonaticide
- Victim: Baby Boy Grossberg-Peterson
- Perpetrators: Amy Grossberg and Brian Peterson
- Motive: Lack of a desire for the baby
- Charges: First-degree murder (dropped after plea deal)
- Verdict: Pleaded guilty
- Convictions: Manslaughter
- Sentence: Grossberg: 2 1/2 years in prison (paroled after 1 year and 10 months); Peterson: 2 years in prison (paroled after 1 year and 8 months)

Amy S. Grossberg (born 1978) is an American woman who delivered a baby at a Comfort Inn in Newark, Delaware, in November 1996, assisted only by her then-boyfriend Brian C. Peterson (born 1978), who later threw the baby into a dumpster. In March 1998, Peterson pled guilty to manslaughter and was given the mandatory minimum sentence of two years in prison; on April 22, 1998, Grossberg agreed to a plea bargain, and was sentenced to two-and-a-half years in prison on July 9, 1998.

== Pregnancy and birth ==
Grossberg and Peterson dated while at Ramapo High School, growing up in the affluent suburb of Wyckoff, New Jersey. Grossberg successfully hid the pregnancy from her parents, wanting mostly to shield it from her mother, wearing baggy clothes and avoiding her parents for the course of the nine months. In September, she enrolled as a freshman at the University of Delaware, while Peterson enrolled at college in Gettysburg, Pennsylvania.

In November 1996, Grossberg's water broke. Peterson drove three hours from his college to hers and checked them into the Comfort Inn in Newark, Delaware. Grossberg delivered the unnamed child on November 12. Conflicting stories have made the subsequent events a mystery to anyone except the couple, but Peterson and Grossberg claim they believed the infant to be stillborn, wrapped him in a garbage bag, and disposed of him in a dumpster.

== Investigation ==
The bloody sheets were discovered by a cleaning woman, who immediately contacted police. After returning to school, Grossberg began to have severe seizures as a result of not having expelled the placenta. She was taken to a hospital, and it was clear to the doctors that she had just given birth. Not long after, police officials and the hospital put the two incidents together. K-9 Police dogs found the body in the dumpster.

The couple's initial claim that the child was stillborn was quickly rejected. An autopsy indicated that the infant was delivered alive and that the cause of death was several head fractures and Shaken Baby Syndrome. The cause of the injuries was inconclusive. The D.A. announced that he would charge the couple with first degree murder and pursue the death penalty against them. Peterson and Grossberg, who at first seemed to remain a loving couple, turned on each other and each began blaming the other. In December 1996 they were indicted for the murder. Peterson stated emphatically that Grossberg told him to "get rid of it!"; Grossberg claimed that Peterson acted alone in putting the boy into the dumpster.

In March 1998, Peterson pled guilty to manslaughter in exchange for his testimony against Grossberg at her trial. In addition to his initial claims, he stated that he tried to get Amy to a hospital, but she refused. When Grossberg heard Peterson's statement in detail, she agreed to a plea bargain, on April 22, 1998. She admitted to unintentionally causing the death of the infant and said that she and Peterson never planned to kill the baby. A concern of attorneys for both defendants regarding going to trial was that the pictures of the baby's head would be displayed in court and lead to more severe penalties. (It was noted on Court TV that such pictures could not be shown on television.)

While Peterson was sentenced to two years, Grossberg was held to be more responsible and was sentenced to two-and-a-half years. Peterson was released from prison in January 2000 after serving 20 months. His incarceration was reduced for good conduct and for the time he served before his sentencing. Grossberg was released from prison in May 2000, after serving 22 months.

== Aftermath ==
Peterson relocated from Wyckoff with his mother and step-father to Jupiter, Florida, where he works for his family's video company. He then married college student Jaime Chabora.

An artist, Grossberg started her own company, called Just Because Invitations, in February 2004.

== Media portrayals ==
These events were depicted in a non-fiction crime book by journalist Doug Most, who covered the case for The Bergen Record of Hackensack, New Jersey for more than two years. The book was titled Always in Our Hearts: The Story of Amy Grossberg, Brian Peterson and the Baby They Didn't Want. The book traces the story from their high school days in New Jersey through the pregnancy and secret delivery in the motel room, to the court hearings and ultimately the sentencing. Of the book, Kirkus Reviews called it a "true crime page turner" and Booklist said, "Teens will be drawn to this examination of a horrific crime committed by two bright college students."

Peterson and Grossberg's story was fictionalized by writer T. Coraghessan Boyle in a story, "The Love of My Life", which appeared in his collection of short stories, After The Plague. After learning of the story in the media, Boyle became curious as to how a couple could commit such an act, and explored their points of view through a fictionalized account of the case, changing certain details such as the characters' names and the gender of the infant.

Law & Order devoted a story to this case in the Season 8 episode "Denial" (1997). In this episode, the two teens are acquitted. This Law & Order episode inspired a Law & Order: UK episode, "Bad Romance" (2014). The Practice and Homicide: Life on the Street also did episodes based on this case.

The Grossberg-Peterson case is obliquely referenced in Stanley Kubrick's Eyes Wide Shut: an article about the trial is visible in a fictitious New York Post edition, adjacent to the plot-advancing story about the death of a model perused by Tom Cruise's character.

== See also ==
- Infanticide
- Neonaticide
