= Ramapo Indian Hills Regional High School District =

School district in Bergen County, New Jersey, US

Address
- 131 Yawpo Avenue Oakland, Bergen County, New Jersey, 07436; United States
- Coordinates: 41.019728°N 74.231052°W

District information
- Grades: 9-12
- Superintendent: Shauna DeMarco
- Business administrator: Matthew Bouldin
- Schools: 2

Students and staff
- Enrollment: 1,856 (as of 2024–25)
- Faculty: 189.5 FTEs
- Student–teacher ratio: 9.8:1

Other information
- District Factor Group: I
- Website: www.rih.org
Ind.	Per pupil	District spending	Rank (*)	9-12 average	%± vs. average
1A	Total Spending	$23,039	36	$18,891	22.0%
1	Budgetary Cost	17,773	39	15,592	14.0%
2	Classroom Instruction	9,440	27	8,807	7.2%
6	Support Services	2,660	35	2,294	16.0%
8	Administrative Cost	1,971	45	1,592	23.8%
10	Operations & Maintenance	2,369	42	1,954	21.2%
13	Extracurricular Activities	1,302	43	873	49.1%
16	Median Teacher Salary	61,807	10	71,726
Data from NJDoE 2014 Taxpayers' Guide to Education Spending. *Of 9-12 districts with any number of students. Lowest spending=1; Highest=47

The Ramapo Indian Hills Regional High School District is a comprehensive regional public school district consisting of two four-year public high schools serving students in ninth through twelfth grades from Franklin Lakes, Oakland, and Wyckoff, three suburban communities in Bergen County, in the U.S. state of New Jersey. Students entering the district as freshmen have the option to attend either of the district's high schools, regardless of their residence, subject to a choice made during eighth grade.

As of the 2024–25 school year, the district, comprised of two schools, had an enrollment of 1,856 students and 189.5 classroom teachers (on an FTE basis), for a student–teacher ratio of 9.8:1.

== History ==
With baby boomers filling the school beyond capacity, the Ramsey Public School District informed its sending districts of Franklin Lakes and Wyckoff in 1954 that it would no longer accept students from those two communities at Ramsey High School beyond the 1956-57 school year. Oakland, which sent its students to Pompton Lakes High School, joined the other two districts in pursuing a joint regional high school.

After Ramsey High School issued an ultimatum to their sending communities, the creation of a regional high school was approved in 1954 by Franklin Lakes, Oakland and Wyckoff (often called the FLOW district for the initial letters in the names of the three communities) by a margin of 1,060 to 51. The name "Ramapo Regional High School District" was chosen for the district in February 1954 when the inaugural board of education was sworn in.

By a nearly 3–1 margin, voters approved a February 1955 referendum that would cover the bulk of the $2.2 million (equivalent to $25.2 million in 2025) required for the 50-acre (20 ha) site and the construction of the school building. A steel strike, bad weather and other construction obstacles delayed the opening of the new school building, forcing Ramapo High School to start the 1956-57 school year with evening sessions held at Eastern Christian High School in North Haledon, with the school day running from 2:45 to 7:00 PM. Constructed with a capacity for 1,080 students, the new almost-finished Ramapo High School building in Franklin Lakes opened in January 1957 with an enrollment of 655.

In the years after Ramapo High School opened, district enrollment rose from 650 to more than 2,000, ultimately requiring the school to operate with double sessions. Constructed at a cost of $3 million (equivalent to $31.1 million in 2025), Indian Hills High School in Oakland opened in September 1964 serving 575 students in grades 9-11 from Oakland and portions of Franklin Lakes.

In 1999, the district allowed students from Franklin Lakes to choose which high school to attend, ending the policy under which students in the eastern half of Franklin Lakes were required to attend Ramapo High School while those in the borough's western half were assigned to Indian Hills High School. Oakland students were generally assigned to Indian Hills while Wyckoff residents could select which school to attend.

The district had been classified by the New Jersey Department of Education as being in District Factor Group "I", the second-highest of eight groupings. District Factor Groups organize districts statewide to allow comparison by common socioeconomic characteristics of the local districts. From lowest socioeconomic status to highest, the categories are A, B, CD, DE, FG, GH, I and J.

== Schools ==
Schools in the district (with 2024–25 enrollment data from the National Center for Education Statistics) are:

- Indian Hills High School, located in Oakland, with 668 students
  - Gregory Vacca, principal
- Ramapo High School, located in Franklin Lakes, with 1,166 students
  - Claudia Dargento, acting principal

== Administration ==
Core members of the district's administration are:

- Shauna DeMarco, superintendent
- Matthew Bouldin, business administrator

== Board of education ==
=== Overview ===
The district's board of education, comprised of nine members, sets policy and oversees the fiscal and educational operation of the district through its administration. As a Type II school district, the board's trustees are elected directly by voters to serve three-year terms of office on a staggered basis, with three seats up for election each year held (since 2012) as part of the November general election. The board appoints a superintendent to oversee the district's day-to-day operations and a business administrator to supervise the business functions of the district. Seats on the board are allocated based on the population of the constituent municipalities, with four seats allocated to Wyckoff, three to Oakland and two to Franklin Lakes.

=== 2014 ===
In 2014, Board member Debra Strauss of Franklin Lakes resigned effective February 24 while members Elizabeth Pierce of Oakland as well as Isabelle Lanini and Lynn Budd of Wyckoff each resigned effective April 23. Local media linked the four sudden resignations to the Board's "disputed" search for a permanent superintendent to succeed Lauren Schoen (who had transferred to a position in Mahwah the prior year), which, in May 2014, culminated in district curriculum director Beverly MacKay being chosen for the role; The Record, as evidence, highlighted how the Board was set to interview the final four superintendent candidates (including MacKay) the same week that the latter three resignations were announced. In April 2014, Lisa Sciancalepore was appointed to the vacant Franklin Lakes seat, and, in May, Teresa Kilday filled the Oakland seat while Tom Madigan (who had previously served on the board for 12 years) and David Becker were appointed to the Wyckoff positions.

In the November 2014 election, Lisa Sciancalepore was elected (with 865 votes) to the remaining one year of what had been Debra Strauss' term; Teresa Kilday was elected (with 912) to a new three-year term; board vice president Sadie Quinlan of Oakland was re-elected (with 1,136); Jane Castor was elected (also with 1,136) to a one-year unexpired term representing Oakland; Tom Madigan was elected (with 2,012) to the remaining two years of what had been Isabelle Lanini's term; and David Becker was elected (with 1,976) to a new three-year term. Every candidate for the regional board of education ran unopposed in 2014.

=== 2015 ===
In the November 2015 election, Lisa Sciancalepore of Franklin Lakes was elected (with 651 votes) to her first full term on the board, Jane Castor was re-elected (with 1,178) to her third term representing Oakland, and Kenneth Porro of Wyckoff was re-elected (with 1,631) to his second term on the body. All three candidates ran unopposed.

=== 2016 ===
In January 2016, board member Tom Madigan resigned upon his being appointed to replace Dave Connolly on Wyckoff's township committee; Christine Becker (who was also considered for the committee position) was appointed to serve for the remainder of Madigan's term, which was set to expire in December 2016.

In the November 2016 election, Christine Becker (with 2,592 votes) was elected to her first full term on the regional board of education and president Thomas Bunting (with 2,849) was re-elected to his third; both ran without competition and to represent Wyckoff. Meanwhile, incumbent John Butto of Franklin Lakes (with 1,492 votes) was elected to his second full term, defeating June-2016-Ramapo-High-School-graduate Thomas Rukaj (who earned 852).

=== 2017 ===
In the November 2017 election, board member David Becker (with 2,262 votes) was re-elected to his second three-year term representing Wyckoff. Sadie Quinlan and Teresa Kilday's Oakland seats were also up for re-election, but they decided not to run and no candidates filed to replace them — therefore the positions were to be filled by whichever individuals received the most write-in votes. Quinlan and Kilday earned the most write-in votes, and they were both sworn into new terms (along with Becker) in January 2018.

=== 2018 ===
In January 2018, 20-year-old Seton Hall University student Thomas Rukaj was appointed to represent Franklin Lakes on the Board for the remaining one year of what had been member Lisa Sciancalapore's term until she resigned.

In the November 2018 election, Franklin Lakes board representative Thomas Rukaj (with 1,309 votes) was re-elected to his first full three-year term, Filomena LaForgia (with 1,924) was elected to the Oakland seat that had been opened by Jane Castor deciding against seeking re-election, and John Kinney (with 3,627) was elected to the Wyckoff seat that had been Kenneth Porro's. All three races were uncontested.

=== 2019 ===
In the November 2019 election, John Carolan (with 1,527 votes) and Robert Fortunato (with 1,298) defeated Marc Schaeffer (who earned 1,052 votes) and Frances Nelson (who earned 939), replacing Christine Becker and Thomas Bunting (who decided against running for re-election) to represent Wyckoff on the regional board of education. In Franklin Lakes, John Butto (with 766 votes) was re-elected to his third three-year term while, in Oakland, Judith Sullivan (with 1,029) was elected to her first full term; both the Franklin Lakes and Oakland races were uncontested, though 331 write-in votes were cast in opposition to Sullivan.

=== 2020 ===
In October 2019, Ramapo Indian Hills Superintendent Beverly Mackay announced that she would be retiring from the position effective August 1, 2020. The district accepted applications for an interim replacement through February 14, 2020, and eventually hired Bruce Watson to serve as interim superintendent starting August 3, 2020 — but he announced his resignation on September 10, effective November 5, 2020, never providing an explanation for his sudden departure; 16-year-veteran district business administrator Frank Ceurvels also announced his retirement in September, effective January 2021. At the time, Board President John Kinney said the search for their successors would start "immediately," while member Filomena LaForgia, retrospectively, attributed the chaotic transition to the district, "grappling with the effects of the COVID-19 pandemic."

In August 2020, Oakland board representative Theresa Kilday resigned, prompting the Board to advertise amongst the district for the position and, thereafter, conduct official interviews; Vivian Yudin King and Carmen LeVon were the final two candidates, with LeVon being appointed to immediately replace Kilday on October 12, 2020.

In the November 2020 election, James Setteducato (with 7,092 votes) faced no challenger (though 325 write-in votes were cast in opposition) and was re-elected to represent Wyckoff on the regional board; Helen Koulikourdis (with 3,924 votes) defeated incumbent Natalie Zammitti Shaw (who earned 1,797 votes), winning her first term as a Franklin Lakes representative; and, in Oakland, incumbent Judith Sullivan was re-elected with 3,437 votes while newcomer Vivian Yudin King (with 3,458 votes) defeated then-Oakland-councilman Eric Kulmala (who earned 3,314) in the race to permanently fill the seat formerly occupied by Theresa Kilday.

=== 2021 ===
In January 2021, the Board approved the hiring of Anthony Riscica to succeed Bruce Watson as the Ramapo Indian Hills interim superintendent (through June 2021) and Thomas Lambe to permanently succeed Frank Ceurvels as the district's business administrator. On March 8, 2021, the Board hired a firm (Hazard, Young, Attea & Associates) to help find a permanent successor to former superintendent Beverly MacKay, who had retired in August 2020.

On August 9, 2021, the Board (aided by Hazard & Young) approved the hiring of Rui Dionisio to, starting that November, officially take over as the next full-time Ramapo Indian Hills superintendent. Dionisio had served as the superintendent of Verona Public Schools since 2014 and, before that, was the principal of Cranford High School and an administrator with Ridgewood Public Schools. At the time, the Board touted that Dionisio had, in Verona, previously led "mental health and suicide prevention [initiatives], resulting in financial support and public adoption of an innovative, therapeutic mental health program," while also pointing to his having overseen capital investment and energy improvement projects totaling $50 million; Filomena Laforgia, president of the Ramapo Indian Hills Board at the time, said that "Dr. Dionisio fits the bill," as a "strong, dynamic, and thoughtful leader," who was capable of leading the district "through some critical changes."

In the November 2021 election, a number of board candidates endorsed each other across municipal and school-district borders, forming an unprecedented coalition of parents’-rights-oriented "take back" candidates running for the regional as well as various local school boards; newcomers Marianna Emmolo of Wyckoff and Kim Ansh of Franklin lakes in addition to incumbent board president Filomena LaForgia of Oakland campaigned with this focus in the regional board of education elections. Leading up to election day, LaForgia was, "...the most vocal of the anti-mask-mandate candidates, at first refusing to wear a mask at meetings and receiving a no-confidence vote from the faculty in response," while Ansh campaigned on, "...medical freedom, transparency, parental rights and...[banning] Critical Race Theory...from school curriculum"; meanwhile, fake brochures decorated with, "...symbols for LGBT...Rights [and] a Black Lives Matter clenched fist," were circulated (and thereafter condemned by both targeted candidates), which claimed Lorenz wanted to, "...[make] America 'less white,' '[abolish] the police,' and...'reprogram our youth to accept and promote racial and gender diversity,'" and stated that Koulikourdis advocated for, "...mandated vaccines for all students and faculty; implementing diversity, equity and inclusion curriculum; and promoting an 'LGBTQ atmosphere'".

In November 2021, Wyckoff challenger Emmolo (with 2,124 votes) defeated incumbent John Kinney (who earned 1,983), Franklin Lakes incumbent Helen Koulikourdis (with 1,530 votes) defeated challenger Ansh (who earned 1,503), and Oakland challenger — a dean at Ramapo College — Aaron Lorenz (with 1,620 votes) defeated incumbent LaForgia (who earned 1,427).

=== 2022 ===
Board member Vivian Yudin King was questioned over her role in approving purchases by the school district of appliances from her family business, Yudin's Appliances, which she worked for while serving on the Board; in 2022, the Yudins sued four politically-involved district parents (who were later cleared of wrongdoing in State Superior Court) for defamation over this continuous criticism. Franklin Lakes Borough Council candidate Joel Ansh, one of the individuals sued, used the lawsuit in his campaign, creating a website and distributing materials that, "accus[ed] the Yudins of attempting to suppress their First Amendment rights to free speech".

In 2022, president John Carolan and member Robert Fortunato decided not to run for re-election to additional terms representing Wyckoff on the regional board of education. In the November election, a slate of Tom Bogdansky (with 3,203 votes) and Doreen Mariani (with 3,009) defeated the team of Brian DeLaite (who earned 2,475 votes) and Edward Seavers (who earned 2,365) to replace Carolan and Fortunato. The two campaigns raised disagreements on issues including COVID-19 policies and curriculum implementation. In Franklin Lakes, meanwhile, Kim Ansh (with 1,911 votes) defeated incumbent Maria Underfer (who earned 1,676) for a seat on the regional board; Ansh's campaign associated itself with Bogdansky's candidacy as well as his and Mariani's ideology.

Mirroring national trends, both the 2021 and 2022 regional school board elections were markedly divisive and partisan. Following the 2022 election, a parents' rights bloc of Board members, made up of Judith Sullivan, Marianna Emmolo, Tom Bogdansky, Doreen Mariani, and Kim Ansh and focused in part on "...handling the implementation of [the] state’s mandates regarding health/physical education and diversity, equity, and inclusion," held a five-seat majority on the nine-seat body.

In November 2022, Brian DeLaite (who was recently defeated in a race for a different seat on the body) was appointed to fill a vacancy on the Board following James Setteducato's resignation in September.

=== 2023 ===
At the January 2023 reorganization meeting, the Board's parents' rights bloc selected a president (Judith Sullivan) and vice president (Kim Ansh) from among themselves and (with five-to-four votes) issued a number of controversial motions, including overturning two of the three harassment, intimidation, and bullying policies recommended by superintendent Rui Dionisio.

In February 2023, after the Board ended the relationship with its longtime attorney (Fogarty and Hara), Adam Weiss of Busch Law Group was hired to represent the district. In May 2023, Weiss resigned from the role, citing how the board, "...weaponiz[ed] our legal advice in attacks against each other," as there was, "...a marked degradation in the level of civility, trust and respect...[making] it particularly difficult to guide...the board".

In July 2023, Kim Ansh, Judith Sullivan, Marianna Emmolo, and Doreen Mariani rejected three mental health programs recommendations, which would have renewed a contract for school-based counseling and made new agreements to train and certify school district personnel as well as establish online access to treatment providers for students and staff. In August 2023, the Board held a special meeting where members reversed course and near-unanimously accepted the recommendations.

In August 2023, the Board approved curriculum for the 2023-2024 school year by an 8-1 vote, with only Ansh voting no. During the meeting, Bogdansky asked about The 1619 Project and critical race theory; Ansh, meanwhile, criticized materials' references to same-sex relationships and gender ideology as well as how she perceived the materials as overemphasizing the academic contributions of individuals from certain minority groups, claiming, "Residents and parents want their children to be taught how to think, not what to think," and suggesting that the Board should be focusing on improving test scores and graduation readiness.

In September 2023, board member Aaron Lorenz introduced a motion (which later failed) to remove Judith Sullivan, who had confirmed she was not running for re-election in November, as president of the body.

==== 2023 superintendent search ====
From April 2023 to October 2023, Ramapo Indian Hills saw the departure of its business administrator, superintendent, and curriculum director, all leaving to take similar roles in other districts Superintendent Rui Dionisio's August 15 announcement that he would resign, effective mid-November, to lead the Fair Lawn public school district (after serving only two of his five contracted years at RIH) was particularly disruptive.

Board President Judith Sullivan attempted to convene a special session immediately in August, but a majority of members failed to attend leading to three options being presented at the next regular meeting: appointing an acting superintendent from within Ramapo Indian Hills, hiring an interim superintendent from outside the district for a limited term, or contracting a search firm to immediately begin seeking Dionisio's long-term successor. At this meeting, board member Aaron Lorenz, however, quickly rejected the first and third options, preferring only to hire another interim superintendent — arguing that "The board is not in any position to be supervising an acting superintendent at this time." Fellow members Vivian Yudin King and Tom Bogdansky seconded this stance, with Yudin King suggesting a search firm should be hired "closer to the end of the year" while Bogdansky reported that five local superintendents he had consulted all advised the district to "first seek an interim [superintendent] while a firm is engaged to conduct a more leisurely search for a permanent replacement."

In a series of votes over the next several board meetings, Bogdansky would join "minority" members Lorenz, Yudin King, Brian DeLaite, and Helen Koulikourdis to form a coalition that defeated the options to appoint an acting superintendent or initiate an immediate search. At a September 11 meeting, this coalition voted again to table these options, with Bogdansky consistently citing advice from local administrators that the "deeply divided board" should hire an interim and wait for dynamics to "calm down" before searching for a permanent replacement.

On October 16, the Board voted 5-4 to approve the hiring of James Baker (who had previously served as superintendent of Middlesex Public Schools from 2004 through 2013 and, thereafter, served as an interim administrator in North Brunswick, East Windsor, and Roselle) as interim superintendent at a rate of $800 per day — with Bogdansky, DeLaite, Koulikourdis, Lorenz, and Yudin King voting in favor; at the same meeting, Bogdansky again joined the board "minority" to vote down a motion to hire a permanent superintendent search firm.

On November 30, board member Marianna Emmolo introduced a motion to hire Hazard, Young, Attea & Associates (the firm that had helped hire Dionisio), arguing Hazard & Young were offering a discounted rate and warning that the Board was "running behind if it wants a new superintendent in place by the start of the next school year." Koulikourdis, however, countered that "proper procedure" would be to solicit proposals from all interested search firms before selecting one, saying: "We may end up with Hazard Young, but the process should be done correctly." The same grouping of "minority" members plus Bogdansky defeated Emmolo's proposal. Later in the meeting, Bogdansky introduced a motion to issue a request for proposals due by December 31 — meaning that the newly sworn-in 2024 Board would choose a firm and the superintendent instead of splitting the process between current and future members — which passed with eight votes.

==== 2023 election ====
In the November 2023 election, incumbent Brian DeLaite (with 2,293 votes) was elected to his first full term representing Wyckoff on the regional board of education, defeating challenger Jared Geist (who earned 2,059 votes). In Oakland, meanwhile, the team of Audrey Souders (with 2,072 votes) and Melissa Kiel (with 1,893) defeated incumbent Vivian Yudin King (who earned 1,414 votes) and her running-mate Amy Eilert (who earned 1,378); board president Judith Sullivan was up for re-election alongside Yudin King, but she decided against running again.

In the Wyckoff race, Geist was described by media as, "...allied with 'Parents' Rights' groups," due to, for example, his campaign materials having stated, "'We're extremely committed to faith'...[and] 'I will promote transparency, support traditional academics without agendas or ideology'", and, in the Oakland race, Yudin King was called "pro-public education" whereas Souders and Kiel were dubbed "parental rights candidates". Local media characterized the 2023 regional school board races as "where the action is", connected their divisiveness to a trending national "culture war", and suggested they were some of the cycle's key board races — microcosms, retrospectively, of "mixed results" statewide.

=== 2024 ===
In January 2024, the Board approved $115,200 of its 2024-2025 budget to be used for the hiring of one armed guard at each district high school — both Class III officers who have full police powers as, "...retired law enforcement officers under age 65 who had served as full-time police officers in New Jersey within three years of appointment, and who were trained as school resource officers". The budgetary inclusion passed with only member Aaron Lorenz voting no; he argued it was a "hasty decision", that, "...the data is not clear that [armed guards] makes school safer," and that their presence, "...alters the atmosphere of the school itself".

Also in January 2024, district Superintendent James Baker joined a board meeting to discuss "recent concerns with some hate issues" following a drawn swastika and written Jewish slur being discovered in a bathroom at Ramapo High School — the third antisemitic bias incident documented since the start of the school year. Though local Jewish leaders and police officials confirmed that, "the incident was reported properly to law enforcement," and school district officials wrote to parents that they, "unequivocally condemn acts of hatred of all types," some residents, "...criticized the seven-day delay in the school's announcement and said, as parent Jeffrey Greene put it, [the district] 'has simply tried to sweep the incident under the rug'".

In March 2024, the Board's parents' rights bloc (President Kim Ansh, Vice President Marianna Emmolo, Tom Bogdansky, Melissa Kiel, Doreen Mariani, and Audrey Souders) passed a measure to rescind the district's policy regarding transgender students, which previously allowed students who changed their gender status with the school to decide whether or not their parents should be informed of the change. The Board majority argued that the policy violated a different district statute stipulating that parents, "...shall have access to records and information pertaining to his or her unemancipated child including but not limited to medical, dental insurance, child care and educational records." Board President Kim Ansh stated that a parent's trust in educators is a "sacred bond" and, "When you are now in a situation where the school may be lying to you about your child, that trust is broken," whereas member Brian DeLaite countered that abolishing the transgender policy was meant to, "appease a certain constituency in our community at the expense of those that need the most protection," as, "If you have a great relationship with your children, they're going to share with you [while] The children who need to be protected the most are the ones who are at risk in their own homes." Board attorney Kerri Wright cautioned that the vote may not ultimately have any impact on how the district will handle transgender students, as New Jersey guidelines, "...provide very specific protections for your students and obligations for the school board and the school district to abide by them," and, "...the law does very clearly protect the rights of transgender students." At the following Board meeting, five RIH students and a psychologist from Glen Rock (who had patients attending district schools) spoke out against the transgender policy's abolition, claiming the risks of outing students to unsupportive parents included suicide, abuse, and being expelled from their homes.

==== 2024 superintendent search ====
In May 2024, the Board held a special meeting over the Memorial Day break during which they unanimously approved a five-year, $1.9 million contract for Dr. Ronnie Tarchichi to, starting July 1, serve as the Ramapo Indian Hills superintendent, setting his base salary at $280,000 and his fifth-year salary at $393,786; Tarchichi had previously led the Pennsauken school district. A separate 7-0-2 vote (board members Audrey Souders and Melissa Kiel abstained) resulted in the sudden, unexplained termination of interim superintendent James Baker's contact, which was set to expire in July. Later in the meeting, members voted 5-4 (with Tom Bogdansky, Brian DeLaite, Aaron Lorenz and Helen Koulikourdis voting "no") to appoint the district's director of curriculum, Dr. Melissa Quackenbush, to act as interim superintendent until Tarchichi's tenure began; Quackenbush had just been hired by Ramapo Indian Hills in February 2024 following a stint as a single-subject curriculum supervisor with Paramus public schools.

In the final days of June 2024, the Board held another special meeting where its members voted 5-0-3 (Bogdansky, Koulikourdis, Lorenz abstained while DeLaite was absent) to rescind the contract offered to Tarchichi the month prior; the three members who abstained all agreed that "[They] do not have enough information to make a sound decision." Media reported that, between his May appointment and his contract being rescinded in June, Tarchichi and the Board had discussed him continuing to work in some capacity with his former district to ease the latter's transition — but there were no public conclusions to these talks and the Board provided no official explanation for the termination. In a subsequent vote, the Board voted 5-3 (with Bogdansky, Koulikourdis, and Lorenz voting "no") to extend Acting Superintendent Quackenbush's contract by 60 days; members then swapped positions so that a motion to begin searching for an interim superintendent failed 3-5 (with Kim Ansh, Marianna Emmolo, Melissa Kiel, Doreen Mariani, and Audrey Souders voting against it).

After inexplicably rescinding Tarchichi's contract in late June, the Ramapo Indian Hills Board of Education held a follow-up special meeting on July 1, the day Tarchichi was set to begin his tenure; the meeting was only open to the public for 20 minutes before the Board went into a closed session to discuss "personnel," after which members did not publicly reconvene. The Board did not explain why Tarchichi's contract was rescinded, nor did they announce further plans other than Acting Superintendent Quackenbush remaining at the district's helm. At the meeting, former Oakland representative Vivian Yudin King criticized the Board for having, "...opened up the district to a huge lawsuit," claiming: "You guys are running the schools and you are running it into the ground," whereas other local education leaders questioned Quackenbush's qualifications, saying, for example: "She does not have the experience to lead our district out of the mess that [the Board has] caused."

The Board next convened at a special meeting on July 11, during which "minority" members Brian DeLaite, Helen Koulikourdis, and Aaron Lorenz were joined by Tom Bogdansky in proposing that the body "pause the current [superintendent] search immediately" and begin a new search after hiring a second interim superintendent who would, officially, succeed James Baker in the role; the four members claimed that: "...continuing the search with the current applicant pool poses significant risks to our schools and the community...[as] We have grave concerns about the thoroughness and accuracy of the information provided by each candidate." Board president Kim Ansh dismissed these criticisms while vice president Marianna Emmolo argued the proposal was a "political" ploy to delay the process and "see who's on the board next year." The proposal was ultimately defeated and the Board ended the meeting with a three-and-a-half hour closed session that yielded no action.

At the next board meeting, on July 22, two new superintendent candidates were discussed but not named. The unnamed third candidate became, in particular, a point of contention: five Board members (Ansh, Emmolo, Melissa Kiel, Doreen Mariani and Audrey Souders) voted to submit the third candidate's contract to the Bergen County Office of Education for approval, while Bogdansky, Koulikourdis, Lorenz and DeLaite voted against the submission. Bogdansky questioned: "Why has the process we used for both candidates one and two changed for candidate three?" asserting that the, "...lack of consultation not only undermines the principles of transparency and accountability, but also diminishes the legitimacy of the decisions made"; Lorenz and Koulikourdis declared the third candidate "unqualified"; and Koulikourdis, individually, claimed that President Ansh had violated the Open Public Meetings Act by privately calling more than five involved persons to discuss the candidacy. Ansh, meanwhile, asserted that: "...board members can say whatever you want in public, we went through the process, the person is highly qualified," and Emmolo posited that: "There's a narrative being built here for a reason," and the search was "a perfect process" with "very qualified" candidates. Later in the meeting, audience member Margaret Bennett, a former Franklin Lakes grade school board representative, claimed that Acting Superintendent Quackenbush had "...inserted herself in the superintendent search process, specifically seeking to have herself named assistant superintendent," suggesting she had evidence that former Interim Superintendent Baker and Tarchichi, during his short time contracted, had denied Quackenbush's requests — specifically claiming that Tarachichi advised Quackenbush to "...have waited to make changes to the supervisor structure," and that, "...he intended to undo much of the top-heavy structure that she created." Board member Brian DeLaite responded to these claims by planning to email the executive county superintendent to express concerns, "...with any possibility of the assistant superintendent position being created that would, in [his] opinion, be counter to the economic and academic needs of our districts," whereas Souders defended Quackenbush, pointing to: "...how much time [she has committed], how much she loves what she does, how much she is trying to improve our district. And I think that everything she does is directed toward that goal of improving our students and our district's reputation."

On August 7, the Board held a special meeting during which they revealed that the (previously unnamed) third candidate for the superintendent position was Shauna DeMarco, who had been the superintendent of Tenafly schools from July 2018 to December 2022 and, before that, was a teacher, principal, assistant superintendent, and, finally, superintendent at Lyndhurst public schools. The Board voted 5-4 to approve DeMarco's contract, which stipulated that she enter a $1.4 million, four-year agreement with Ramapo Indian Hills, starting on August 14, 2024, and ending in June 2028; the four members who previously called DeMarco "unqualified" (DeLaite, Koulikourdis, Lorenz, and Bogdansky) voted against her hiring, but they were outnumbered by Ansh, Emmolo, Mariani, Souders, and Kiel who approved the contract. The "no" votes decried the meeting having taken place during the week "...between the end of summer activities and the beginning of fall sports practices when many families traditionally take their vacations," (with Koulikourdis saying: "We should not even be here...There has been a reckless disregard for the process,") whereas Mariani countered: "The full board of nine should have been involved, and if some chose not to be as involved as they should have been, that's on them." Once DeMarco was hired, in August 2024, she became the district's first permanent superintendent since Rui Dionisio resigned a year earlier.

==== 2024 election ====
In the November 2024 election, incumbent Marianna Emmolo (with 4,467 votes) lost re-election to her second term representing Wyckoff, defeated by John Kinney (who earned 4,616) who she had overtaken the seat from in the 2021 election; incumbent Helen Koulikourdis (with 3,497 votes) won re-election to her second full term representing Franklin Lakes, defeating challenger Caryn Nash (who earned 2,480); and incumbent Aaron Lorenz (with 2,791 votes) lost re-election to his second term representing Oakland, losing to challenger Joseph Valenti (who earned 4,118). Kinney, Koulikourdis, and Lorenz all ran under shared slogan "Supporting Our Students," whereas Valenti was expected to join the parents' rights coalition, given that Oakland Board member Audrey Lynn Souders publicly supported his candidacy. After the election, the Record concluded that "the board [is] split philosophically 5-3 with minority faction Kinney, Koulikourdis and Brian DeLaite," while, "Trustee Tom Bogdansky has proved to be a swing vote, sometimes siding with one group or the other."

Throughout 2024 election, Wyckoff challenger John Kinney campaigned on fiscal responsibility, citing how "Under the current board majority, spending has spiraled out of control—legal fees alone have increased by over 400%, and nearly $250K was wasted canceling a superintendent’s contract with no explanation"; rebuilding community trust in the Board; embracing nonpartisanship; and by touting his having led the district through the COVID-19 Pandemic as former Board President. Incumbent Marianna Emmolo, meanwhile, campaigned on boosting graduation readiness and implementing a block schedule while arguing that Kinney lacked a "meaningful strategic plan" during his leadership and that, under his watch, the district's academic performance declined; she also articulated the need to rebalance the distribution of students between Ramapo Indian Hills' two high schools and touted efforts to enhance parent-district communication.

=== 2025 ===
At its January 2025 board of education reorganization meeting, members Audrey Souders, Doreen Mariani, Kim Ansh, and Joseph Valenti elected Souders as board president, defeating 5-4 Tom Bogdansky, Helen Koulikourdis, John Kinney, and Brian DeLaite's bid to elect Bogdansky president; next, Mariani was elected vice president over Helen Koulikourdis by the same 5-4 margin. At the same meeting, Bodgansky, DeLaite, and Koulikourdis voiced objections to reappointing Porzio law group as the board's general counsel, citing increased costs.

At the end of January 2025, an appellate court mandated that Ramapo Indian Hills board members turn over email logs from their personal devices to comply with an OPRA request made under the name Alex Rosetti, which members and media supposed was a pseudonym. According to the ruling, Rosetti became suspicious when, at the January 2023 reorganization meeting, "the board was able to vote upon[,] without any significant discussion," an "intricate, involved and expansive agenda," which included three newly-elected members joining two incumbents to announce and approve of 12 controversial walk-in motions, causing Rosetti to conclude that "communications regarding board business are taking place outside the realm of the district-controlled email account." The appellate judge reviewed evidence such as "dozens of redactions demonstrating board members using their district-supplied email accounts to communicate with other board members' personal email accounts, and even sending information to their own personal accounts," and agreed, ruling that: "[these] email logs are government records under the Open Public Records Act because they relate to board business even though they are on board members' private servers and not maintained nor controlled by the board." The Board's insurance attorney, however, vowed to further appeal, while district superintendent Shauna Demarco argued that "Requiring a board of education member to provide such a log of all of their personal emails is a significant intrusion into their privacy rights."

In March 2025, the Board approved the hiring of Matthew Bouldin to, effective July 1, replace interim administrator Dora Zeno who had served in the role since April 2023.
