= Indian Hills High School (New Jersey) =

High school in Bergen County, New Jersey, US

Location
- 97 Yawpo Avenue; Oakland, Bergen County, New Jersey 07436; United States; 41.021584°N 74.2342°W

Information
- Type: Public high school
- Established: September 1964
- School district: Ramapo Indian Hills Regional High School District
- NCES School ID: 341356000724
- Principal: Gregory Vacca
- Faculty: 75.4 FTEs
- Grades: 9–12
- Enrollment: 668 (as of 2024–25)
- Student to teacher ratio: 8.9:1
- Colors: Navy and Gold
- Athletics conference: Big North Conference (general); North Jersey Super Football Conference (football)
- Team name: Braves
- Rival: Ramapo High School
- Website: indianhills.rih.org

Indian Hills High School is a comprehensive four-year public high school serving students in ninth through twelfth grades, located in Bergen County, in the U.S. state of New Jersey. The school is a part of the Ramapo Indian Hills Regional High School District, serving students from Franklin Lakes, Oakland and Wyckoff. The high school is located in Oakland. Ramapo High School is the other high school in the district. Students from the three feeder districts may make the choice of which high school to attend by February of the year that they are in eighth grade.

As of the 2024–25 school year, the school had an enrollment of 668 students and 75.4 classroom teachers (on an FTE basis), for a student–teacher ratio of 8.9:1. There were 14 students (2.1% of enrollment) eligible for free lunch and 9 (1.3% of students) eligible for reduced-cost lunch.

== History ==
In less than a decade after Ramapo High School opened, district enrollment rose from 650 to more than 2,000, ultimately requiring the school to operate with double sessions. Constructed to alleviate the overcrowding at a cost of $3 million (equivalent to $31.1 million in 2025), the school opened in September 1964 serving 575 students in grades 9-11 from Oakland and the portions of Franklin Lakes closest to the new school, while students from Wyckoff and the rest of Franklin Lakes attended Ramapo High School.

In 1999, the district allowed students from Franklin Lakes to choose which high school to attend, ending the policy under which students in the eastern half of Franklin Lakes were required to attend Ramapo High School while those in the borough's western half were assigned to Indian Hills High School. Oakland students were generally assigned to Indian Hills while Wyckoff residents could select which school to attend.

== Awards, recognition and rankings ==
The school was the 60th-ranked public high school in New Jersey out of 339 schools statewide in New Jersey Monthly magazine's September 2014 cover story on the state's "Top Public High Schools", using a new ranking methodology. The school had been ranked 43rd in the state of 328 schools in 2012, after being ranked 35th in 2010 out of 322 schools listed. The magazine ranked the school 40th in 2008 out of 316 schools. The school was ranked 36th in the magazine's September 2006 issue, which included 316 schools across the state. Schooldigger.com ranked the school 89th out of 381 public high schools statewide in its 2011 rankings (an increase of 5 positions from the 2010 ranking) which were based on the combined percentage of students classified as proficient or above proficient on the mathematics (86.9%) and language arts literacy (97.2%) components of the High School Proficiency Assessment (HSPA).

In the 2011 "Ranking America's High Schools" issue by The Washington Post, the school was ranked 56th in New Jersey and 1,647 nationwide.

The Indian Hills Academic Decathlon Team, coached by Lisa Acquaire from 1995 to 2009, represented New Jersey in the National Competition in 2001 (Anchorage, AK), 2006 (San Antonio, TX), and 2007 (Honolulu, HI). At the competition in Alaska, the Indian Hills Team was awarded Rookie of the Year and member Brent Morris earned a medal for his overall score that placed him as the third highest scoring decathlete at his level. In 2010, under coach Michael Catelli, the team ranked second in the state and the 2012 team finishing third in the statewide competition. In 2014 the team competed in the online national competition and was ranked second in the nation in their division.

== Athletics ==
The Indian Hills High School Braves compete in the Big North Conference, which is comprised of public and private high schools in Bergen and Passaic counties, and was established following a reorganization of sports leagues in Northern New Jersey by the New Jersey State Interscholastic Athletic Association (NJSIAA). The school had participated in the North Bergen Interscholastic Athletic League before the 2010 realignment. With 808 students in grades 10-12, the school was classified by the NJSIAA for the 2019–20 school year as Group III for most athletic competition purposes, which included schools with an enrollment of 761 to 1,058 students in that grade range. The football team competes in the Ivy White division of the North Jersey Super Football Conference, which includes 112 schools competing in 20 divisions, making it the nation's biggest football-only high school sports league. The football team is one of the 12 programs assigned to the two Ivy divisions starting in 2020, which are intended to allow weaker programs ineligible for playoff participation to compete primarily against each other. The school was classified by the NJSIAA as Group II North for football for 2024–2026, which included schools with 484 to 683 students.

Indian Hills High School has a long-standing rivalry with Ramapo High School, most notably with the school's football, lacrosse, and ice hockey teams. The Indian Hills-Ramapo football rivalry had been a yearly tradition since the founding of Indian Hills in 1964. Ramapo won the first two games of the series as only the class of 1966 was eligible to play for Indian Hills. However once that class became seniors Indian Hills began a dominant streak winning 20 of the next 24 games. After a period of even play Ramapo has dominated the modern era winning 12 of 13 games. Ramapo won the 2009 by a score of 41-0, though realignment and the disparity in size between the two schools makes continuation of the series for scheduled games increasingly unlikely.

The girls' soccer team won the all-groups state championship in 1980 and 1981 (defeating Steinert High School in the tournament final in both years), won the Group III/IV combined state title in 1984 (vs. Ewing High School), the Group III title in 1989 (vs. Holy Cross Academy), and the Group II title in 2002 (as co-champion with Delaware Valley Regional High School) and 2003 (vs. Cinnaminson High School). The program's six state titles are tied for eighth-most in the state. The 1981 team finished the season with a record of 18-5 after winning the program's second straight all-groups title with a 3-1 win in the championship game against a Steinert (Hamilton East) team that came into the finals at 22-0. The 1984 soccer team finished the season with a 23-2 record after defeating Ewing High School by a score of 3-0 in the Division A (since reclassified as Group III/IV) championship game. The 2003 girls soccer team won the North I Group II tournament, defeating River Dell High School 1-0 in the final.

The ice hockey team won the Handchen Cup in 1993.

In 2005, the girls' tennis team took the North I, Group II championship, beating Tenafly High School 3½-1½.

The baseball team took the North I, Group II state sectional title in 2007 with a 5-0 win over Westwood Regional High School.

The 2009-10 winter track team won the League, North I Group II sectional Championship, and Group II state championship.

The 2010 spring track team won the League, County Group B, and North I Group II sectional championship making them triple crown winners two years in a row.

The softball team won the Group II state championship in 2010 (defeating runner-up Overbrook High School in the tournament finals), and won the Group II title in 2013 (vs. Wall High School) and 2014 (vs. Ewing High School). The team won the 2003 North I, Group II title over Hopatcong High School, winning by a score of 6-1. The 2010 team won leagues, counties, state sectionals and state groups with only two losses the entire season. Indian Hills got its 31st win of the season, defeating Pequannock Township High School by a score of 1-0 to take the North I, Group II, sectional title, making it the 14th team in New Jersey history to finish with 31 wins in a single season. The 2013 team finished the season with a 32-3 record after winning the Group III title by defeating Wall by a score of 4-2 in the championship game. The 2014 softball team won the Group III state championship, defeating Ewing High School in the tournament final by a score of 8-5 to become the first team in the sport to finish their season undefeated with a 34-0 record. NJ.com / The Star-Ledger ranked Indian Hills as their number-one softball team in the state in 2010 and 2014.

The boys cross country team won the Group III state championship in 2015.

== Administration ==
The school's principal is Gregory Vacca. His administration team includes two assistant principals.

== Notable alumni ==
- Jonathan Ames (born 1964), writer, artist and actor
- Cindy Callaghan (born c. 1970, class of 1988), author of children's books whose first book, Just Add Magic, was adapted into an Amazon television series by the same name
- Scott Frank (born 1958), former professional boxer who fought and lost to World Boxing Council world heavyweight champion Larry Holmes
- Karen McCullah (born 1967), screenwriter and novelist
- Doug McKeon (born 1966), actor, director and screenwriter who first achieved notability as a juvenile performer in the television series The Edge of Night and the films Uncle Joe Shannon and On Golden Pond
- Jack Wallace (born 1998, class of 2016), ice sled hockey player who was a member of the gold medal winning US team in Para ice hockey at the 2018 Winter Paralympics
