= Ramapo High School (New Jersey) =

High school in Bergen County, New Jersey, US

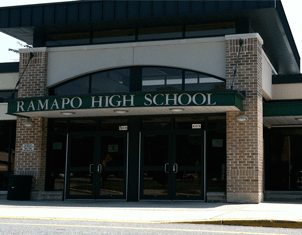

Location
- 331 George Street; Franklin Lakes, Bergen County, New Jersey 07417; United States; 40.999847°N 74.194027°W

Information
- Type: Public high school
- Established: September 1956
- School district: Ramapo Indian Hills Regional High School District
- NCES School ID: 341359000730
- Principal: Claudia Dargento
- Faculty: 77.8 FTEs
- Grades: 9–12
- Enrollment: 739 (as of 2024–25)
- Student to teacher ratio: 9.5:1
- Colors: Dark green and white
- Athletics conference: Big North Conference (general); North Jersey Super Football Conference (football)
- Team name: Raiders
- Publication: Rampage
- Website: ramapo.rih.org

Ramapo High School is a comprehensive four-year public high school located in the New York City suburb of Franklin Lakes, in Bergen County, in the U.S. state of New Jersey. The school is a part of the Ramapo Indian Hills Regional High School District, serving students in ninth through twelfth grades from Franklin Lakes, Oakland, and Wyckoff (FLOW). The other high school in the district is Indian Hills High School, located in Oakland. Students in eighth grade in the three sending districts have the opportunity to choose between Ramapo and Indian Hills by February in their graduating year.

As of the 2024–25 school year, the school had an enrollment of 739 students and 77.8 classroom teachers (on an FTE basis), for a student–teacher ratio of 9.5:1. There were 29 students (3.9% of enrollment) eligible for free lunch and 9 (1.2% of students) eligible for reduced-cost lunch.

== History ==
With baby boomers filling the school beyond capacity, the Ramsey Public School District informed its sending districts of Franklin Lakes and Wyckoff in 1954 that it would no longer accept students from those two communities at Ramsey High School beyond the 1956–57 school year. Oakland, which sent its students to Pompton Lakes High School, joined the other two districts in pursuing a joint regional high school.

By a nearly 3–1 margin, voters in the three constituent communities approved a February 1955 referendum that would cover the bulk of the $2.2 million (equivalent to $25.2 million in 2025) required for the 50-acre (20 ha) site and the construction of the school building. A steel strike, bad weather and other construction obstacles delayed the opening of the new school building, forcing Ramapo High School to start the 1956–57 school year with evening sessions held at Eastern Christian High School in North Haledon, with the school day running from 2:45 to 7:00 PM. Constructed with a capacity for 1,080 students, the new almost-finished Ramapo High School building in Franklin Lakes opened in January 1957 with an enrollment of 655.

== Awards, recognition and rankings ==
The school was the 5th-ranked public high school in New Jersey out of 305 schools statewide in New Jersey Monthly magazine's September 2018 cover story on the state's "Top Public High Schools", using a new ranking methodology. The school had been ranked 17th in the state of 328 schools in 2012, after being ranked 19th in 2010 out of 322 schools listed. The magazine ranked the school 23rd in 2008 out of 316 schools. The school was ranked 28th in the magazine's September 2006 issue, which included 316 schools across the state.

Schooldigger.com ranked the school tied for 53rd out of 381 public high schools statewide in its 2011 rankings (a decrease of 11 positions from the 2010 ranking) which were based on the combined percentage of students classified as proficient or above proficient on the mathematics (93.1%) and language arts literacy (96.5%) components of the High School Proficiency Assessment (HSPA).

In the 2011 "Ranking America's High Schools" issue by The Washington Post, the school was ranked 46th in New Jersey and 1,479 nationwide.

== University programs ==
The school, in tandem with Indian Hills High School, offers several special programs similar to college majors, wherein students are accepted into one of the programs and take a series of honors-level courses, in lieu of electives. Ramapo offers a University Program in engineering, which introduces students to the world of Engineering with courses designed to give students a taste of various engineering fields, as well as helping them become familiar with the tools of an engineer, such as AutoCAD. This program is also tied to an extracurricular club, Robotics club, in which members of the engineering program build a robot to compete in a competition with other schools.

Communications and Theatre Arts students take classes together. District superintendent C. Lauren Schoen announced that the Communications and Theater Arts programs are being discontinued from Ramapo.

== Athletics ==
The Ramapo High School Raiders compete in the Big North Conference, which is comprised of public and private high schools in Bergen and Passaic counties, and was established following a reorganization of sports leagues in Northern New Jersey by the New Jersey State Interscholastic Athletic Association (NJSIAA). Prior to the realignment in 2010, Ramapo competed in the North Bergen Interscholastic Athletic League, which included schools in Bergen County. With 885 students in grades 10–12, the school was classified by the NJSIAA for the 2019–20 school year as Group III for most athletic competition purposes, which included schools with an enrollment of 761 to 1,058 students in that grade range. The football team competes in the Patriot Red division of the North Jersey Super Football Conference, which includes 112 schools competing in 20 divisions, making it the nation's biggest football-only high school sports league. The school was classified by the NJSIAA as Group IV North for football for 2024–2026, which included schools with 893 to 1,315 students.

The school was recognized as the Group III winner of the NJSIAA ShopRite Cup in 2005–06. The award recognized the school for achieving first-place finishes in boys' golf, boys' lacrosse and softball; second place in boys' tennis and girls' volleyball; and third place in football (tie) and girls' soccer (tie). The school repeated as the Group III winner of the NJSIAA ShopRite Cup in 2006–07, recognizing the school for achieving first place in girls' soccer, girls' indoor track and field and girls' track and field; second place in boys' lacrosse, softball, girls' indoor track and field relays and boys' soccer; and third place in boys' fencing and girls' tennis; plus bonus points for no disqualifications in two of three seasons.

=== Baseball ===
The boys' baseball team won the Group III state championship in 2001, defeating Toms River South High School by a score of 8–4 in the title game.

In 2022, the team won the North I Group III state sectional title, the program's first in 17 years, defeating Montville Township High School by a 3–2 score in the tournament final.

=== Basketball ===
With the group finals cancelled in 2020 due to COVID, the girls' basketball team was declared the North III regional champion.

=== Bowling ===
The 2009–10 boys bowling team won the NBIL Division 1 championship over Paramus Catholic High School, while finishing the season ranked fifth in North Jersey. The team also finished tied with Don Bosco for 8th overall at the county tournament, and came in fourth in a tough group at the state sectionals. In the 2010–11 season, Ramapo continued upon the previous year's success, with a fifth-place finish in the county tournament, second place in the Big North division 5, and a North 1-A Group 3 sectional championship, defeating Pascack Valley High School, resulting in a season-ending ranking of third in North Jersey and 17th in the state.

=== Cheerleading ===
In 2012 and 2013 the cheerleading squad won the Contest of Champions Nationals.

=== Fencing ===
The boys fencing team was the team / foil team / épée team winner in 1964, foil team winner in 1966, overall team winner in 1973, 1976, 1977, 1979–1985, 1991, 1992, 1995–1997, 1999, 2001 and 2002, and sabre team winner in 2006, 2009 and 2011. The 18 state team championships and 21 individual titles are the most of any school in the state

In 2009, Ramapo had the fencing state individual champion Adrian Bak, a member of the US national fencing team, who led Ramapo to a team sabre state title. In 2011, Charles Copti continued the trend and went on to win the state individual championship for the Sabre weapon.

=== Football ===
The football team won the NJSIAA North I Group III state sectional championships in 1974, 1983, 1993, 1997, 2000, 2001, 2003, 2009, 2012, 2015, 2018 and 2019.

The 1974 team finished the season with a 9–1 record after winning the first North I Group III sectional title of the playoff era with a 46–14 victory against Dumont High School indoors at the Atlantic City Convention Hall.

The 1983 team finished the season with a 9–2 record after winning the North I Group III state sectional championship with a 13–7 win in the playoff finals against Wayne Valley High School.

The 1997 team was ranked 19th in the nation by USA Today after finishing the season with a record of 11–0 .

In 2000, the team won the North I Group III section with a 14–7 win in the championship game against Wayne Hills High School.

In 2001, the team finished the season with a 12–0 record after winning the North I Group III state championship with a 14–10 victory against Wayne Hills, which lost in the sectional title game for the fifth year in a row.

The 2009 team won the North I Group III state championship beating archrival Wayne Hills by a score of 16–8 at Giants Stadium, for the team's first title since 2003.

After falling behind by a score of 26–7 at the half, the 2012 football team went on to win the North I Group III state championship by a score of 37–34 over Sparta High School after scoring 20 unanswered points in the third quarter and kicking a 48-yard field goal with seconds left in the game to break a tie.

In 2015, the Ramapo Raiders beat River Dell High School in the North I Group III state championship by a score of 45–15, earning the team's 10th state title in school history and the 5th state title under the direction of Coach Drew Gibbs. The 2015 football team finished the season with an 11–1 record.

In 2018, the team won the North I Group III sectional title with a 31–7 win against River Dell in the playoff finals and then went on to win the inaugural NJSIAA bowl game title by beating Summit High School by a score of 42–22, in the North Group III regional final at MetLife Stadium, completing the program's fourth unbeaten season all-time and becoming the first school in New Jersey history to finish 13–0.

The 2019 team beat Pascack Valley High School by a score of 28–23 to win the North I Group III championship.

=== Golf ===
The 2010 boys golf team won the state Group III championship.

=== Gymnastics ===
The 2014 gymnastics team scored a 111.3 at the North Jersey Gymnastics League A-Division, which was the highest score in the state in 2014.

=== Lacrosse ===
The boys lacrosse team won the Group II state championship in 2006 (defeating Montgomery High School in the tournament final) and 2017 (vs. Rumson-Fair Haven Regional High School).

The team won the 2006 Group II title with a 12–10 over Montgomery High School and advanced to the Tournament of Champions where they lost to Ridgewood High School by a score of 10–6. The 2010 team advanced to the Group II final, in which they lost to Princeton High School. With three goals in the game's final 84 seconds, Ramapo tied the game and took the Group II final into overtime, where they defeated Rumson-Fair Haven Regional High School by a score of 12–11 to win the 2017 tournament.

=== Soccer ===
==== Boys' soccer ====
The boys' soccer team won the Group III state championship in 1990 (vs. Raritan High School), 1999 (as co-champion with Ocean City High School), 2002 (in double overtime vs. Ridge High School), 2007 (vs. Ocean City), 2011 (vs. Timber Creek Regional High School), 2012 (as co-champion with Princeton High School) and 2016 (vs. Toms River High School South). The 2007 boys' soccer team won the North I, Group III state sectional championship with a 2–0 win over Morris Hills High School in the tournament final. The win was Ramapo's fifth sectional title since 2002. The team moved on to win the Group III state championship with a 1–0 win over Ocean City High School. The win was the team's fourth state championship, and their first since 2002.

The 2007 boys' and girls' soccer teams went to the New Jersey Group III state championships, the girls losing and the boys winning with a 1–0 victory against Ocean City High School. In 2008, the boys soccer team won the county title over Don Bosco Preparatory High School but lost in the state semi finals to Millburn High School, while the girls team lost in the county championship to top-seeded Immaculate Heart Academy and won the state title by defeating Freehold High School by a score of 3–1 in the finals.

The 2011 boys soccer team was at one point ranked #16 in the country. They finished the season with a record of 22–1 and won the Group III state tournament over Timber Creek Regional High School by a score of 3–1.

In 2016, the Ramapo Raiders boys' soccer team was ranked 17th in the nation by USA Today / NSCAA. The team won the Group III state tournament with a win against Toms River South High School in the tournament final by a score of 3–0 and finished the season with a record of 22–0, the first team in the state without a loss since Ramapo did it in 2012.

==== Girls' soccer ====
The girls' soccer team won the Group III / IV combined title in 1982 (vs. East Brunswick High School) and 1983 (vs. Ewing High School), won the Group III state championships in 1985 (vs. Ewing), 1986 (as co-champion with Bridgewater-Raritan High School East), 1987 (vs. Ewing), 1990 (as co-champion with Camden Catholic High School), 1996 (vs. Brick Township High School), 1997 (vs. Lacey Township High School), 1998 (vs. Wall Township High School), 1999 (vs. Middletown High School South), 2006 (as co-champion with Freehold High School) 2008 (vs. Freehold) and 2015 (vs. Holmdel High School), giving the team 13 state titles, the most of any public school in the state.

After pulling ahead with a goal in the middle of the second overtime period, the 1986 team had to settle for the co-championship after Bridgewater-Raritan East scored a goal to tie the game at the final score of 3–3 in the last minute of play.

The 1990 team finished the season 21–1–3 after a scoreless tie in the Group III finals against Camden Catholic at Trenton State College.

A 2–0 win against Middletown South in the 1999 Group III state championship game gave the program its five straight titles.

The team tied Freehold High School 0–0 in the 2006 Group III championship game held at Trenton State College, with both teams sharing the co-championship. In 2007, the girls' soccer team won the North I, Group III state sectional championship with a 2–0 win over Northern Highlands Regional High School in the tournament final, the team's 14th sectional title in the preceding 16 years.

In 2015, the girls' soccer team won the NJSIAA Group II state championship by a score of 2–0 against Holmdel High School in the tournament final.

=== Softball ===
The softball team won the Group III state title in 1978 (against runner-up Triton Regional High School in the finals) and 2006 (vs. Wall Township High School).

The 1978 team ran their season record to 2204 after winning the Group III state championship with a 1–0 victory against Triton in the tournament's final game.

The 2006 team finished the season with a record of 29–1 after winning the Group III title with a 2–0 victory against Wall Township in the championship game. NJ.com / The Star-Ledger ranked Ramapo as their number-one softball team in the state in 2006.

The softball team won the 2007 North I, Group III state sectional championship with a 2–0 win over Paramus High School.

=== Tennis ===
==== Boys' tennis ====
The boys' tennis team won the Group IV state championship in 1972 (vs. Cherry Hill High School East), 1973 and 1974 (vs. Westfield High School both years), won the Group III title in 1977 (vs. Moorestown High School), 1985 (vs. Parsippany Hills High School), 1988 (vs. West Morris Central High School), 1989 (vs. Eastern Regional High School), 1991 (vs. Montville High School), 1992 (vs. North Brunswick High School), 1993 (vs. Montville), 1994 (vs. Morris Knolls High School), 1996 (vs. North Bruncswick), 1992 (vs. Millburn High School). The team won the overall state championship in 1973 (vs. Mountain Lakes High School), 1974 (vs. West Essex High School) and 1985 (vs. Christian Brothers Academy). The program's 13 state championships are tied for the fourth most of any high school team in the state.

==== Girls' tennis ====
The girls' tennis team won the North I state sectional championship in 1974 and 1975 and won the state championship in 1975 (defeating Princeton High School in the final match of the tournament), won the Group II title in 1976 (vs. Rumson-Fair Haven Regional High School), 1977 (vs. Holy Spirit High School), 1984 (vs. Watchung Hills Regional High School), 1986 (vs. Watchung Hills) 1991 (vs. West Essex High School), 1994 (vs. Ocean City High School), 1995 (vs. Nutley High School). The eight group team titles are tied for fifth-most of any public school in the state.

In 2007, the girls tennis team won the North I, Group III state sectional championship with a 3–2 win over Northern Highlands Regional High School in the tournament finals. The win was the team's second consecutive title, and the 21st in team history.

=== Track and field ===
The girls' track team was the indoor track Group III state championship in 2007, 2013 and 2014. The 2007 girls' track team won the State Group III indoor and outdoor titles; a team finished second in the Penn Relays distance medley relay in a Bergen County time of 11 minutes, 56.59 seconds.

The girls' track team won the winter track Group III state title in 2007.

The 2009–10 spring track boys' sprint medley team placed first overall in the Bergen County Relays in Division A, posting the 19th fastest time ever run in the county with a 3:32.7 and a 1:53 800 anchor leg by junior Bradley Paternostro. At the East Coast Relays, the sprint medley team came in first with a time of 3:28 (Bradley anchored in a 1:52), posting the seventh-fastest time in county history. The SMR will compete in nationals in North Carolina as well as Bradley in the open 800m race. Bradley was awarded the Bernard Smith Award for the Best Male Track Athlete of the meet, also running the anchor leg of the 4x400 boys relay which placed 4th. Also, Ramapo earned 2nd place in the 4x100 and a 4th-place finish in both the 4x200 and 4x400. At the 2010 State Sectional Meet, Paternostro won both the mile and 800, and the team placed fourth overall. At the 2010 Bergen Meet of Champions, Bradley won the 800 and anchored a 5th overall 4 × 400 m relay. In 1974 the mile relay team took 1st place at the league championship meet. During the 2018 season, the boys' team won its first ever major relay meet, winning the Comet Relays Large School Division.

=== Cross country ===
The boys' cross country team won the Group IV state championship in 1969.

=== Girls' volleyball ===
The girls' volleyball team won the Group III state championship in 1984 (defeating Northern Valley Regional High School at Old Tappan in the final match of the tournament) and 1993 (vs. Paramus High School), and won the Group II title in 2010 (vs. Northern Burlington County Regional High School) and 2016 (vs. River Dell High School). The 1984 team won the Group III title after defeating Old Tappan in three games (15–10, 8–15, 15–6) in the tournament final.

=== Wrestling ===
The 2009, the wrestling team won the first league title in program history by defeating Northern Valley at Old Tappan in a 28–28 tie. The tie was broken from the "Second Tie Breaking Criteria: Most Matches Won". Ramapo had 8 wins while Old Tappan only had 6. The wrestling team won the title for its division in the league the following year. There are currently nine wrestlers who are part of the "100 Win Club".

== Academic teams ==
The debate team won the 2007 state title in the JP Morgan Chase Lincoln Douglas Debate tournament. They also were victorious at the league and county level to take their first ever triple crown of debate.

The DECA team dominated the regional competition in 2008, only to be upset in the states. In February 2009, the team led Bergen County high schools and were awarded first place in the regional competition before earning fifth place in the state competition.

Members of the Academic Decathlon team reached the third round of News 12 New Jersey's The Challenge. The Academic Decathlon team was also awarded first place overall in the regional competition, and second place at the state level. A pair of 2009 graduates each won the gold medal for highest score in their grade divisions at both competitions. The 2011 Academic Decathlon team came in first place overall in the regional competition, and fourth place at the state competition.

== Theatre arts ==
Ramapo's performing arts program consists of the Gold Masque Theatre Club. Performances such as Into the Woods and Les Misérables have received Paper Mill Playhouse recognition.

== Administration ==
The school's principal is Claudia Dargento. Her core administration team includes two assistant principals.

== Notable alumni ==
- Marco Benevento (born 1977; class of 1995), jazz musician
- Blake Costanzo (born 1984, class of 2001), former NFL linebacker
- Kirk DeMicco (born 1969), screenwriter, director and producer, best known for writing and directing Space Chimps and The Croods
- Mary P. Easley (class of 1968), attorney, academic, and former university administrator who, as the wife of Governor Mike Easley, served as First Lady of North Carolina from 2001 to 2009
- Amy Grossberg (born 1978; class of 1996), served two and half years in jail for killing her baby while a student at the University of Delaware.
- Morgan Hoffmann (born 1989), professional golfer
- Chris Hogan (born 1988), wide receiver for the New England Patriots
- Ross Krautman (born 1991, class of 2010), football placekicker for the Syracuse University Orange football team
- Martha MacCallum (born 1964; class of 1982), news anchor on Fox News Channel
- Constantine Maroulis (born 1975; class of 1993), Tony Award nominee and finalist from the 2005 American Idol
- Sunny Mehta (born 1978; class of 1996), General Manager of the New Jersey Devils, former professional poker player, trader, author, and musician
- Rob Milanese (born 1980; class of 1998), Arena Football League wide receiver/cornerback for the Philadelphia Soul
- Tim Pernetti (born 1970, class of 1989), former athletic director of Rutgers University and former Vice President of CBS College Sports Network
- Brian Peterson (born 1978; class of 1996), served two years in jail for killing his baby with his girlfriend, Amy Grossberg.
- Greg Schiano (born 1966; class of 1984), former Tampa Bay Buccaneers head coach and current head football coach at Rutgers University
- Chris Simms (born 1980; class of 1999), NFL former quarterback for the Tampa Bay Buccaneers and Denver Broncos
- Danny Tamberelli (born 1982; class of 2000), actor, comedian and musician, known for his appearances on TV in The Adventures of Pete & Pete and The Magic School Bus, as well as appearing in the films Igby Goes Down and The Mighty Ducks
- Ingrid Superstar (born 1945; class of 1963), Warhol superstar, actress, and poet
- Jeremy Zucker (born 1996), singer-songwriter best known for his song "Comethru", which has accumulated over 200 million streams on Spotify

== Notable faculty ==
- Paul Apostol (born 1945), fencing coach and competitive fencer who competed in the individual and team sabre events at the 1972 and 1976 Summer Olympics
