= List of Just Add Magic episodes =

Just Add Magic is an American live-action family television series, loosely based on the book of the same name by Cindy Callaghan. It was produced by Amazon Studios. A pilot was produced in 2015 and the series commissioned for a full season the following year. Amazon renewed the series for a second season in June 2016 after it "set a record as the most successful Amazon Original Kids premiere weekend in terms of U.S. Prime Video streams and hours."

A followup series, Just Add Magic: Mystery City, was released on January 17, 2020.

== Series overview ==
| Season | Episodes | | Originally released | |
| Season | Episodes | | First released | Last released |
|---|---|---|---|---|
| 1 | 13 | | January 15, 2015 | January 14, 2016 |
| 2 | 26 | 13 | October 14, 2016 | January 12, 2017 |
| 2 | 26 | 13 | January 19, 2018 | |
| 3 | 12 | 11 | February 1, 2019 | |
| 3 | 12 | 1 | October 25, 2019 | |

Mystery City

| Season | Episodes | Originally released |
|---|---|---|
| 1 | 10 | January 17, 2020 |

== Episodes ==
=== Season 1 (2015–16) ===
| No. overall | No. in season | Title | Directed by | Written by | Original release date |
|---|---|---|---|---|---|
| 1 | 1 | "Just Add Magic" | Joe Nussbaum | Nancy Cohen, Joanna Lewis & Kristine Songco | January 15, 2015 |
Kelly Quinn and her two best friends, Hannah Parker-Kent and Darbie O'Brien, make a cake for Becky, Kelly's grandma, to celebrate her birthday. The girls decide to make a recipe from her old cookbook, which they find in the attic. However, upon cooking it, they realize that the cake they made was magic and could make anyone who eats it lose their ability to talk. After careful inspection of the cookbook, they begin to speculate that Becky, who hasn't been able to speak for four months, is under a very powerful spell.
| 2 | 2 | "Just Add Brains" | Joe Menendez | Andrew Orenstein | January 14, 2016 |
The girls make “Brain Boosting Bolognese” to help with school and to understand the cookbook. But being know-it-alls has an unfortunate downside. The girls learn that the cookbook is seemingly infinite: trying to read through it they never get any closer to the last page. Also the cookbook sometimes flips to a page on its own when the girls express their wish to accomplish a specific purpose. The girls learn that Kelly's grandmother, Mama P, and Ms. Silvers were once young friends just like Kelly, Hannah, and Darbie.
| 3 | 3 | "Just Add Dogs" | Joe Nussbaum | Luisa Leschin | January 14, 2016 |
To find a lost dog, the three friends cook up “Lost and Found-ue”, but end up attracting everything that has been lost in the neighborhood. They notice that three pages from the cookbook have been torn out and are missing, but those soon float into Kelly's bedroom. One of the items they return is a silver charm bracelet to Ms. Silvers, who says that it has been missing for many years. Later, she opens one of the charms and plants a seed from within it. Mama P cooks a spell and tries to leave town, but a mysterious wind prevents her from crossing the town border.
| 4 | 4 | "Just Add Mom" | Joe Nussbaum | John-Paul Nickel | January 14, 2016 |
Wanting more information from Mama P, the girls make “Bitter Truth Truffles”. However, Kelly's mom eats one first. Kelly goes out with her mom to keep her from causing problems with her truth-telling. Hannah and Darbie both eat a truffle and find that telling the truth to each other isn't so bad, although they agree that without Kelly, they probably wouldn't be friends. Jake comes over, and unable to lie, they tell him all about the book and magic. They make him promise not to tell anyone. They get Mama P to eat a truffle, but before they can ask her anything, she knowingly eats a second one, which ends the spell's effect on her.
| 5 | 5 | "Just Add Jake" | Joe Menendez | Lauren Thompson | January 14, 2016 |
Not believing in magic, Jake mentions the cookbook to Mama P, and she steals it. But when she tries to look through it, all the pages go blank. The girls try to convince Jake that magic is real by trying out three random magical recipes on him, so that he'll help them get the cookbook back.
| 6 | 6 | "Just Add Birthdays" | Elodie Keene | Sarah Carbiener & Erica Rosbe | January 14, 2016 |
Kelly and Hannah make a cake for Darbie when they forget her birthday. They also make cookies with cocoa nibs Mama P gave them several episodes earlier. Those who eat the cookies start acting much younger than normal.
| 7 | 7 | "Just Add Mama P" | Elodie Keene | Andrew Orenstein | January 14, 2016 |
Convinced Mama P knows more than she is letting on, the girls whip up some “Mind Peering Peppermints”. They hear nothing suspicious in her thoughts, which leads them to trust her. They try to read Ms. Silvers' mind, and she immediately turns to them and tells them not to try it.
| 8 | 8 | "Just Add Besties" | Joe Nussbaum | Luisa Leschin | January 14, 2016 |
Mama P mentors Kelly's magic cooking skills, while Darbie and Hannah try to get a reclusive author's autograph by cooking a spell that makes her their best friend. Mama P makes Kelly organize all the ingredients in her secret pantry, and then curses her and challenges her to overcome it without resorting to the cookbook. After a false start in which she invents a new spell, she does overcome the curse. The BFF spell works too well, and Darbie and Hannah's attempt to end the spell fails. When they describe what they did, Kelly intuitively knows how to end the spell, and does. Mama P tells Ms. Silvers that Kelly has "the gift" just like her grandmother did, and Ms. Silvers warns Mama P not to make her curse Kelly the way she cursed Mama P.
| 9 | 9 | "Just Add Do-Overs" | Keith Samples | John-Paul Nickel | January 14, 2016 |
The girls learn that long ago The Traveler gave Mama P, Ms. Silvers, and Grandma each a Morbium root seed; Morbium makes any recipe a thousand times more powerful. Mama P says hers is long gone, but the girls realize that Ms. Silvers' was in the charm bracelet they returned to her. Hannah takes a piano lesson from Ms. Silvers to try to recover the seed, but things go wrong: Kelly's brother breaks a lamp while under Kelly's care, Darbie's school project goes wrong, and Ms. Silvers catches Hannah and kicks her out. The three girls cook up a "do-over" spell that resets time so they can try again. On the third try, Darbie's school project is a great success, Kelly realizes that her brother is acting out because he wants to spend time with her, and Hannah finds that Ms. Silvers' charm bracelet is empty, but also finds a scrapbook filled with newspaper clippings about bad things that have happened around town. Mama P tells the girls that it is a listing of the curses Ms. Silvers has enacted.
| 10 | 10 | "Just Add Memories" | Vanessa Parise | Lauren Thompson | January 14, 2016 |
Grandma, Mama P, and Ms. Silvers all have photos of Chuck Hankins, a boy from when they were young. The girls find that he went missing a long time ago. Kelly cooks a “Pho-tographic Memory Soup” to examine her memories of the day her grandmother got sick, hoping to find some clue to what caused it, but eating the “Pho-tographic Memory Soup” makes her lose time and memories. She sees that her grandmother wanted to talk to her that day, but that she was too busy to talk to her. She sees that when her grandmother was driving her to a basketball tryout, Ms. Silvers walked up holding a box of ingredients that the girls later found in the attic. Willy Thompson, a man the girls helped previously, tells Hannah that Chuck disappeared from a Ferris Wheel. The girls trade notes, and learn that on her last good day, Kelly's grandmother went to the Cedros Forest.
| 11 | 11 | "Just Add Camping" | Keith Samples | Sarah Carbiener & Erica Rosbe | January 14, 2016 |
Suspecting a clue to Kelly's grandmother's malady hides deep in the forest, the girls set up a Father/Daughter camping trip. While there they face their fears, and then meet The Traveler, who tells them that magic can heal Kelly's grandmother if they are willing to pay the price. Later, the book flips open to a recipe that can break any curse, but the negative consequences will make things much worse.
| 12 | 12 | "Just Add Pluots Part 1" | Joe Nussbaum | Luisa Leschin | January 14, 2016 |
The girls consult with Mama P about the recipe that will break the curse. At first she says it's too dangerous, but then she suggests that making more and having many people eat the results will dilute the negative consequences. Hannah gets Kelly grounded by her Mom, worried that the magical price will be too high. Kelly escapes grounding by cooking a spell to make Darbie look like her. Hannah and Kelly argue at Mama P's, and Hannah realizes that all the things in the scrapbook would benefit Mama P, not Ms. Silvers. She meets Ms. Silvers and they discuss Mama P's plans. Ms. Silvers reveals that she too is cursed: outside her house, no one can hear her play piano. Darbie tries to stop Mama P, but Mama P locks Darbie in her secret pantry and eats the first bite of the magic recipe, so her curse will be broken, rather than Kelly's grandmother's. Kelly goes home and gets yelled at by her mother, but manages to give her grandmother what she thinks is the first bite.
| 13 | 13 | "Just Add Pluots Part 2" | Joe Nussbaum | Andrew Orenstein | January 14, 2016 |
In 1965, Rebecca Quinn (Kelly's grandmother) is on the Ferris Wheel with Chuck. He takes a bite of a candy apple and disappears. The three girls argue. Gina Silvers says the spell was just supposed to keep Chuck away from magic. Ida Perez (Mama P) asks if Rebecca got the Morbium seed back, saying that Chuck stole it. Rebecca promises Gina that they will get Chuck back. In the present, Kelly's dad lets Kelly go to the Pluot Festival because they are sending his mother away to New York for treatment and he wants the family to be together. Ms. Silvers shows up at the Pluot festival, but won't get involved and advises Hannah to abandon her friends and run away to avoid the consequences. Jake and Hannah free Darbie, and mix a magic protection protein shake. At the Pluot Festival, Kelly refuses to drink the shake and pours it out. She gives her grandmother what she thinks is the last bite of the recipe, but it does nothing. Mama P goes on stage and tells off the town. Jake gives Kelly his shake, so she can be protected. Mama P eats the actual last bite, and the entire town freezes in place except for the girls, Mama P, and Ms. Silvers. The two women bicker about who is to blame. Mama P and Ms. Silvers tell the girls that Kelly's grandmother is not innocent either – that after they cursed each other, she threw the book over a waterfall to get rid of it, in effect making their curses permanent. Mama P steals Jake's bike to ride out of town. The girls consult the book, which opens itself to a blank page, which the girls take to mean they need to create their own spell to break the curse. They go to Mama P's ingredient room and realize that they need the properties of three different ingredient families, but mixing them would modify those properties, so they make a layer cake, with each layer producing its own effect. As they bake, the recipe magically appears in the book, in their handwriting. They name it “Last Ditch Layer Cake”. As the girls are about to serve the cake, Ms. Silvers shows up with ground Morbium root and tells the girls she was going to use it to break her own curse, but they need it to strengthen the spell. They express confidence in their work and say they don't need it. They eat the cake, and the town starts up. In addition, Grandma is back to normal and Ms. Silvers plays piano on stage and everyone can hear her. Grandma tells them that she didn't want Kelly and the girls to be endangered by the book, but The Traveler said that the cookbook was no longer hers to give back, because it belonged to the girls. She tried to get rid of the book, tearing out the three pages, but the spell she cast backfired, and in effect she cursed herself. Grandma and Ms. Silvers realize that if their curses are broken, Chuck's might be as well, and if he's back, no one is safe. The Ferris Wheel stops, and a young man in a leather jacket with rolled up jeans steps off and walks away through the crowd, unnoticed.

=== Season 2 (2016–18) ===
| No. overall | No. in season | Title | Directed by | Written by | Original release date |
|---|---|---|---|---|---|
Part 1
| 14 | 1 | "Just Add Halloween" | Joe Nussbaum | Andrew Orenstein | October 14, 2016 |
In order to see what Chuck is up to, Kelly, Hannah, Darbie and The OC's need to do a “Miso-Person's Soup” spell but it requires a Grunde fingerroot which can only be harvested on Halloween. They come up with a plan to cook the “Pick-A-Date Dates” spell to travel back to the past halloween and get the Grunde fingerroot from Ms. Silvers' garden. Back in the past, the girls put on halloween costumes to avoid being recognized by their past selves. After finding that the grunde root has already been stolen by Mama P., they sneak into Mama P's halloween party to steal it from her pantry. Accidentally, they put it in past Hannah's bag. Hannah admits to her friends that she had been invited to Charlotte's party last year without them. The girls follow past Hannah there and steal it back, before traveling back to the present.
| 15 | 2 | "Just Add Summer" | Joe Nussbaum | Luisa Leschin | January 12, 2017 |
The Miso Soup spell has no effect, so instead Kelly cooks a "Settle The Beef" spell in an effort to get Chuck to get to them so he can settle his beef with Grandma. However, the spell warns that if the beef is not settled, a bigger problem will arise. Kelly gives the spell to Grandma but after she asks Kelly not to do magic, Kelly does not tell her that the sandwich containing the Settle the Beef was magical. Immediately after eating the sandwich, their neighbor Willie comes over and expresses his anger at Grandma for not inviting her to her wedding. They settle their disagreement. At home, Kelly's mom expresses her anger about Grandma getting the "first ice cream" with Kelly, Darbie asks Grandma not to cheer so much at her basketball games, and Buddy is angry Grandma washed his lucky jersey and claims that is why they lost their most recent game. Later, Grandma is visited by Ms. Silvers who claims she will never forgive Grandma for how she used her Morbium, the magical seed the traveler gave each of them. Then Mama P comes all the way back from her job in Paris and expresses her anger at Grandma as well. She says the only one she regrets her behavior towards is Jake. Kelly realizes the bigger problem in question is the three of them, who just can't seem to be happy. There is a knock on the door, and it opens to reveal Chuck.
| 16 | 3 | "Just Add Chuck" | Joe Nussbaum | John-Paul Nickel | January 12, 2017 |
Chuck seems not to remember anything, although the OC's (Original Cooks) refuse to believe anything he says. While they confer, Chuck runs away. Kelly, Darbie, and Hannah cook a trust spell to get Chuck to trust them, but the riddle warns to be sure their "friend needs it more." They help Chuck adjust to modern life, but Kelly loses all of her trust and is suspicious of everything, including Darbie's father's new friend Amy, and Hannah herself. Without her trust she confronts Grandma about how Ms. Silvers claimed she misused her Morbium. The girls manage to restore Kelly's trust, but in doing so bring back some of Chuck's memories. They explain to Grandma that Kelly was under a spell. Grandma claims Chuck stole her Morbium, but the girls realize she is lying.
| 17 | 4 | "Just Add 1965" | Keith Samples | Lauren Thompson | January 12, 2017 |
Darbie suspects her parents may be getting back together. The girls use an “If These Walls Could Taco” spell to watch what happened the day the OC's prepared the “Can't Recall Caramel” and try to figure out why Chuck disappeared. However, everything appears to be normal. The OCs make plans to meet up at a restaurant after the Pluot festival. The girls go there and see them confer about Chuck disappearing. They begin to argue, but bring up nothing suspicious. Later, Darbie uses the spell to see if her parents are truly getting back together but she discovers that they think she's "getting the wrong idea" and that her father is dating Amy, the woman at the park. Darbie is furious and upset. Meanwhile, Chuck saves Buddy from a car, earning Kelly's parents gratitude.
| 18 | 5 | "Just Add Saphrön" | Keith Samples | Aminta Goyel | January 12, 2017 |
After Kelly warns him to stay away from her family and the magic cookbook, Chuck manages to create another cookbook using a picture of the girls he obtained from the Quinn attic and begins to alter the original cookbook and steal pages from it to add to his. A new restaurant opens, The Saphrön, where Darbie, her father, and Amy dine for lunch, but Darbie continues to be unhappy about her father and Amy being together. Chuck and Mr. Quinn are also at The Saphrön, prompting Darbie to get Kelly and Hannah over there. Needing something to break her father trusting Chuck, Kelly looks to a magic spell to spot when someone is lying and asks Hannah to cook. With Ms. Silvers' help, Hannah makes Lemon Lie-m Mints, and though a mint was intended only for Mr. Quinn, Jake and Darbie's father also consume one. Mr. Quinn sees through Chuck's lying, while Darbie's father realizes Amy is untruthful about camping, and Jake, who is looking to work at The Saphrön after deciding to quit Mama P's, is unimpressed with the false objectives laid out by its manager, Noelle. Jake ends up returning to Mama P's but has some demands.
| 19 | 6 | "Just Add Fixings" | Joe Nussbaum | Marque Franklin-Williams | January 12, 2017 |
When strange symbols start appearing on the book, Kelly, Hannah and Darbie agree to let Becky cook a spell to contact The Traveller. Becky finds The Traveller is unwell and keeps repeating the word "Rose." Meanwhile, Jake is heartbroken because neither Mama P's nor his own business is attracting customers, thanks to Mama P. disrespecting the entire town. To help fix Jake's broken bike, the girls cook a "Chicken-N-Fixits" spell but it causes them to compulsively fix everything they come across. While under the spell, Kelly "fixes" the book by connecting the symbols, which turn out to be spelling "8529." The fixing spell breaks after the girls help fix Mama P's reputation by getting her to apologize to the town.
| 20 | 7 | "Just Add 8529" | Gregory Guzik | Zachary Panozzo | January 12, 2017 |
Kelly is determined to figure out what the "8529" on the book means. While walking with the book, she notices that the numbers are changing depending on the direction. This helps her realize that 8259 is the number of steps to a certain location. She keeps walking until the number becomes "0" but she can't see anything but trees. She then notices Chuck approaching before he disappears into thin air. She explains this to Hannah and Darbie and they agree to cook the "Make-It-Visible Vinegar Pie" spell in order to see where Chuck went. Unfortunately, the spell turns Kelly invisible. This causes Kelly's mother to be angry at Kelly for not showing up to her speech about preserving Saffron Falls' heritage. The spell helps the girls see that Chuck has been living inside an invisible trailer.
| 21 | 8 | "Just Add Muscles" | Aprill Winney | Taylor Cox & Jacquie Walters | January 12, 2017 |
Inside Chuck's trailer, Kelly, Hannah and Darbie find that Chuck has been stealing their spells into his own magic cookbook. They try but are unable to lift the book. They cook a "Magnetic Pull-Ed Pork" spell to attract the spells back but when the page gets stolen into Chuck's book, it starts attracting their spells to his book instead. The girls decide to steal Chuck's book instead. First, they spy on him to figure out his daily routine. They then make mussels spell to give them super-strength but it only works for Kelly. Since Hannah is meeting her Fox Canyon student mentor, Kelly goes to Chuck's trailer with just Darbie as a lookout. Kelly lifts Chuck's book but it triggers a booby trap, locking her inside. With time running out, Darbie runs to The OCs for help cooking a counterspell outside the trailer. After freeing Kelly, Mama P. remains behind to steal her Morbium back from Chuck.
| 22 | 9 | "Just Add Fire" | Aprill Winney | Matt Goldman | January 12, 2017 |
The protectors and The OCs are brainstorming on how to stop Chuck's book from stealing their spells but Chuck spells them with a sleeping spell which would cause them to sleep for a year if they don't return his book. They break into two groups to figure out a spell to stay awake. Their cookbook opens to a blank page and starts drawing a girl. After noticing the girl has a rose in her hair, they realize that she must be the "Rose" that The Traveler mentioned. After the Rose page is stolen into Chuck's book, they find a wide awake spell in it but it doesn't work because he's the protector of that book. With no choice, the girls surrender the book to Chuck. They agree to cook the last spell in the book which involves burning their book with magical lollipops. Chuck's book steals the magical fire, causing it to burn, restoring all the spells back to the original cookbook.
| 23 | 10 | "Just Add Meddling" | Lily Mariye | John-Paul Nickel | January 12, 2017 |
The OCs cook a spell to trap Chuck in Lavender Heights, but he orders food from Jake and uses it to take over Jake's body, allowing him to come back to Saffron Falls. Kelly confronts her grandmother for using her Morbium to try to break The OC's protectorship of the book. Kelly starts using magic more than normal such as making her father a better negotiator. She cooks a spell to help Darbie spend quality time with her father but it causes everyone else to avoid them and even Amy to break up with Darbie's father. Hannah and Darbie become concerned that Kelly is using too much magic. They try but are unable to get through to her. So, they secretly take away the book from her.
| 24 | 11 | "Just Add Secrets" | Joe Nussbaum | Luisa Leschin | January 12, 2017 |
Hannah, Darbie and The OCs hold an intervention for Kelly because she has become too reliant on magic. Kelly refuses to admit she has a problem, arguing that she only uses magic for good. She goes to Mama P's where she notices that Jake is acting different. She cooks a "spill-the-beans" spell to find out what Jake is hiding but everyone else starts telling Kelly their secrets. Hannah and Darbie are disappointed to find out that Kelly ignored their advice to take a break from magic. While trying to figure out how to break Kelly's spell, the book refuses to open any other page but Rose's spell. When a projection of Rose's drawing says, "Help me," the girls realize that Rose is an actual girl stuck in the book. They call for a meeting at Mama P's. That's when Kelly notices that Jake's new menu sounds like magical spells and that his handwriting matches Chuck's.
| 25 | 12 | "Just Add History" | Joe Nussbaum | Lauren Thompson | January 12, 2017 |
After discovering that Chuck has been pretending to be Jake, the protectors and the OCs agree to play along until they figure out how to remove Chuck from Jake's body. Mama P. begrudgingly agrees to keep him distracted by taking him to an expensive restaurant she had been saving for Jake. Darbie, Hannah and Kelly blame themselves for not noticing that something was wrong with Jake. In Chuck's trailer, they are shocked to find a photo revealing that Chuck is from the 1860s and his full name is Charles Peizer. They cook "Kick Him Out Chicken" Soup spell to kick Chuck out of Jake's body but since Chuck wouldn't drink their soup, they use Ms. Silvers' Morbium to amplify the spell to work through smell. The spell works, but Chuck spells Hannah.
| 26 | 13 | "Just Add Rose" | Joe Nussbaum | Andrew Orenstein | January 12, 2017 |
Chuck's spell causes Hannah to start turning into a drawing in the book like Rose. Kelly and Darbie conclude that Chuck must have put Rose into the book as well. To figure out how to save Hannah before time runs out, they need to know how Rose got into the book. So, they use the "Memories Mallows" spell to see Rose's memories. They find out that Rose was Chuck's sister who got trapped in the book after Chuck cooked a spell to keep the book forever. They go to confront Chuck for sacrising his own sister but when Kelly accesses Chuck's memories, she realizes that Rose got trapped by accident and Chuck had been trying to save her. Forcing Chuck to see Rose causes the spell to break, freeing Rose from the book. Chuck thanks the girls before he and Rose fade into the 1860s.
Part 2
| 27 | 14 | "Just Add Fluffy" | Keith Samples | Andrew Orenstein | January 19, 2018 |
Kelly, Hannah and Darbie discover Mama P's spice pantry is destroyed. Plot now moves to two months earlier, with Kelly's dad working freelance from home, he decides to use the attic as his office. Kelly moves the book and spices into her backpack so her dad doesn't discover them in the old dollhouse when he cleans out the attic. Later, the girls discover the cookbook and spices are missing from Kelly's backpack. The girls are drawn into a whodunit mystery: Who stole the book and spices? Why? The girls cook up a recipe to find the book, but Kelly ends up forgetting customer orders at Mama P's, where she is working to try to earn money to pay for a trip to Washington; Darbie ends up forgetting her lines and accent when she auditions for the school play; and Hannah ends up losing track of time and doesn't make it to the museum, where she was going to earn extra credit, since she is struggling in her new school. A beautifully carved box with the same fork, knife, and spoon symbol on it as the book, is being sold where Grandma Becky works for $450.
| 28 | 15 | "Just Add RJ" | Keith Samples | Aminta Goyel | January 19, 2018 |
The man who told Kelly's father that Grandma Becky was under a spell appears on TV, after having won the lottery and having won big at the tracks. Kelly's dad says he doesn't believe that it's possible, and this man must've cheated. Kelly is equally suspicious that magic must be involved. Jake sleuths and discovers the lottery winner went on a shopping spree, then went to the grocery store, and bought generic cake mix. With the help of Jake, the girls bake a cupcake and complete a switcheroo before the man, RJ, is able to deliver the cupcake to his intended victim. When the girls get home, they open the cupcake box and discover that he used powdered sugar on top of the cupcake. Darbie and Kelly both touch the cupcake and end up getting spelled. RJ is discovered to be a past protector, from the 90's. He was going to give his spelled cupcake to a girl he used to date in high school.
| 29 | 16 | "Just Add Gumdrops" | Adam Weissman | Taylor Cox & Jacquie Walters | January 19, 2018 |
After RJ refuses to give the book back, Kelly, Hannah and Darbie create a gumdrops spell with a misleading title to trick RJ into giving up the book. They throw away the gumdrops but the gumdrops keep coming back, forcing Kelly to eat them. This causes Kelly to give up her interest in magic. When RJ sees the spell, he cooks it to keep the book but it makes him give up the book. He brings it to Kelly's house but Kelly throws into a donation pile since she doesn't care about magic anymore. After learning what happened, Hannah and Darbie track the book down to buy it back. Later on, RJ comes to warn the girls that someone else knows about the magic. Before providing more details, RJ forgets what he was saying and suddenly can't remember anything to do with magic.
| 30 | 17 | "Just Add Time" | Aprill Winney | Matt Goldman | January 19, 2018 |
The girls try to figure out who the other two protectors of the book were. Grandma Becky procures Chucks old trailer and gives it to the girls so they can have some privacy, like a clubhouse. The girls borrow a VCR player and old tube tv to watch some VHS tapes from their high school, Lavender Heights. They cook up a souffle spell to slow time so they can get through the VHS tapes more efficiently. Just as they were about to discover something, the tape gets stuck in the VCR. Kelly's dad offers to help fix it, and while he does, the girls clean and fix up Chuck's old trailer.
| 31 | 18 | "Just Add Telepathy" | Aprill Winney | John-Paul Nickel | January 19, 2018 |
The girls are trying to figure out who cursed RJ to forget about magic. Their primary suspect is Noelle Jasper, RJ's fellow protector who now owns Saphrön. Kelly goes undercover to interview as a waitress at Saphrön and Darbie pretends to be a customer. To stay in touch without suspicion, the girls cook a telepathy spell which lets them hear each other's thoughts. Darbie discovers that Noelle has been using a rosemary popover spice to spell people into liking her food. Kelly sneaks into Noelle's pantry and finds the rosemary desk plant as well as RJ's book bag. Meanwhile, Hannah is covering for Kelly at Mama P's when her teacher, Mr. Morris comes in, leading to awkwardness. When Kelly returns with the things she took from Noelle's pantry, the protectors conclude that Noelle must be the one who cursed RJ to forget magic.
| 32 | 19 | "Just Add Attention" | Joe Nussbaum | Luisa Leschin | January 19, 2018 |
Noelle confronts the girls at Mama P's. The girls think they get spelled by Noelle Jasper, who sips a green drink while staring at them. It seems that the girls have lost the ability to be paid attention to, so they spell a recipe to give them attention, but their plan goes awry when the attention seems to be ALL on them! Grandma Becky discovers the mysterious, but beautifully carved box, in her store, that was given to the store by someone named Laura P., but the key is missing. She calls Miss Silvers over, and the two go through a pile of keys in the hopes of finding the matching one to open the box. Mama P is in cahoots with the man, Adam Lever, running against Kelly's mom for mayor. She promises to dig up dirt on Kelly's mom in exchange for a practically rent-free space in the mall he plans to build, if he is elected. Noelle and Mama P meet, after hours. Hannah makes a new friend at lunch. Later, Mama P has no memory of meeting with Noelle, and no memory of her secret pantry or magic. The girls suspect Noelle is the culprit.
| 33 | 20 | "Just Add Contagion" | Joe Nussbaum | Lauren Thompson | January 19, 2018 |
After Mama P locks up, Noelle rummages through the restaurant looking for her magical rosemary. She falls into the secret pantry, but is interrupted by Mama P coming to open up the next morning. The girls show Mama P her secret pantry, but Mama P is confused, having no memory of the magic. She thinks it's a prank, but the girls insist that it isn't. She sits down to think, but after taking a deep breath, her memory of magic is erased, once again. The girls search through the magic cookbook to try to find a cure for Mama P's lost memory curse. They land on an Extract the Magic Mac&Cheese, hoping that it will extract the memory curse put on her. Mama P tries the mac and cheese but doesn't seem to be released from the curse. She touches Kelly's arm. Darbie's Mom arrives at Mama P's, just before Amy (Darbie's dad's girlfriend), and Darbie suggests the three of them go shopping together, much to her mom and Amy's reluctance. They leave together, clearly uncomfortable. Kelly seems to be more competitive than usual, removing a "Lever Fever" sign from someone's yard and replacing it with her mom's campaign poster. A sales representative arrives at Mama P's. She is very nice to him, which shocks Jake, as it seems extremely out of character for her to be that nice. Hannah meet with Gina Silvers to practice interviewing for a teaching position. Jake video chats with Hannah, who expresses that Mama P has "lost her edge." Hannah proposes that parts of Kelly's and Mama P's personalities must have been extracted and switched from the Mac & Cheese they made. Noelle snaps a photo of Kelly replacing Lever Fever signs and blackmails her into stealing spices from Mama P's spice pantry. Kelly bribed a server at the restaurant where Noelle used to work and discovered that Noelle was fired. Terri finds out that Kelly was replacing campaign signs, and grabs Kelly when saying, "what were you thinking?!" Kelly is back to normal, but now Terri has caught the competitive do-whatever-it-takes attitude. Kelly hugs her mom and the competitive nature is sucked back into Kelly. Hannah quickly touches Kelly and extracts it from her. Meanwhile, out shopping, Darbie struggles to get Amy and her mom to connect. They finally do, when they both agree on an outfit that is too mature for Darbie. They decide they want to be on good terms, for the sake of Darbie. Hannah meets with Gina Silvers before her interview and makes her more nervous. Hannah touches Gina and gives her the Mama P edge. She does well in her interview, and is offered the job. Hannah tells Gina everything, and they figure out they have to return to "Patient Zero," aka, Mama P, to give her personality back. The girls confront Noelle, stating they refuse to give her the magic spices. Noelle has no memory of blackmailing her and has also lost her memory of magic.
| 34 | 21 | "Just Add Beginnings" | Vanessa Parise | Aminta Goyel | January 19, 2018 |
The girls ask Jake to be their plan B, in case they get cursed and lose their memories of magic, too. Someone has been crossing off names in a book: RJ, Noelle Jasper, Mama P.... other names on the list include Becky, Gina, Kelly, Hannah, and Darbie. The girls find a recipe for "Preserve a Memory Fruit Preserves" and decide to make it. Darbie takes charge, disseminating the tasks to each of the girls. The girls say "magic" as the memory they want to preserve, before they bite into their blueberry preserve topped toast. Later, at school, Kelly seems to have lost the memory that she and Darbie are best friends. Hannah seems to have also lost all memories of her friendship with Kelly and Darbie. Jake and Darbie talk and Jake discovers that Darbie has also lost her memory of her friendship with Hannah and Kelly. They all remember doing magic, but they believe they cooked it all alone. Grandma Becky goes to Laura P's house, the woman to sold the ornate box to her store. Laura invites Becky in to talk about the family that asked her to sell some of her things. Laura tells Becky that the family moved away, after having a very hard life, wanting a clean slate. As she is leaving, Becky discovers a photo and asks Laura who it is. Becky immediately calls Kelly leaving a message on her phone about a box, and a key to magic. Meanwhile, Jake goes to Gina to ask for help with getting the girls' memories back. They discover that in order to remember magic, the girls had to forget something, which ended up being their friendship. They see a note in the book about how to return their memories, by going back to what started it all. Gina asks Hannah's sister to recall the first time the three girls met. Jake asks Terri for the same story, from her perspective, to discover how the girls all met. Jake and Gina go to Mama P's to ask her if she remembers how the three girls met. All three perspectives involved a blonde girl who was also there. Jake and Gina ask a blonde girl that is working with Kelly at Mama P's if she remembers how they met. She tells them. Jake and Gina set up the coup. That evening, Becky meets the girls in their trailer... her memory of magic has been erased.
| 35 | 22 | "Just Add Silvers" | Vanessa Parise | Taylor Cox & Jacquie Walters | January 19, 2018 |
To protect Ms. Silvers, the girls cook a spell to clone her so that if anyone tries, they would spell the wrong Silvers. They go with the clones while Jake watches over the real Ms. Silvers. Hannah and one of the clones investigate the magical box Becky had found. The box doesn't seem to contain anything important but Hannah figures out that if it's opened using the book-shaped key head, it shows different content inside. She finds a photo with a caption at the back listing RJ, Noelle and Arthur. They conclude that Arthur is the third protector, spelling people. The real Ms. Silvers goes to check in on her spice garden only to find it destroyed. While explaining what happened, she loses her memory of magic even though she hadn't eaten anything or come across anyone else. This confirms the girls' suspicion that the spell has a delayed effect. Later on, they overhear Ms. Silvers refer to Hannah's teacher Mr. Morris as "Arthur."
| 36 | 23 | "Just Add Barriers" | Keith Samples | John-Paul Nickel | January 19, 2018 |
With Mr. Morris as the top suspect, Hannah sneaks into his office and finds a chart with the OCs and the inbetweeners' faces crossed off while only Kelly, Hannah and Darbie left. This strengthens the girls' suspicion that Arthur is the one cursing people to forget magic. Since Mr. Morris is set to come to the Quinn's house to prep Terri for her campaign debate, the girls realize that they don't have much time. They cook a barrier spell to keep unwanted guests out of the house but unfortunately Arthur arrives earlier. The barrier prevents anyone in the house from leaving as well, causing the girls to be stuck in the house with Arthur. When Terri's campaign manager, Jill suggests Terri should drop her guard in her speech, it gives the girls an idea to break the spell. Right after the spell is broken, Arthur tries to run out but the girls confront him. To their surprise, Arthur reveals that he thought it was Hannah, Kelly and Darbie cursing people.
| 37 | 24 | "Just Add Betrayal" | Keith Samples | Luisa Leschin | January 19, 2018 |
Mr. Morris tells the girls that he was not a protector himself. He was a friend who tried to keep the protectors out of trouble. He reveals that the third protector was a troublemaker named Caroline who used magic for personal gains. When Kelly uses a truth truffles spell to force both Lever and her mother to tell the truth during the debate, Mr. Morris accuses the girls of abusing magic, just like Caroline. After persuasion, he agrees to tell the girls everything he knows about Caroline to help stop her. He says that one time Caroline cooked a spell to go to the following Friday but got stuck there, causing her to lose a chance to audition for the National Conservatory of Ballet. After that, she never recovered. She grew angry and bitter until she quit altogether. Since she had been using the Chameleon Cauliflower spell to change her appearance, the girls realize that Caroline could be anybody.
| 38 | 25 | "Just Add Caroline" | Joe Nussbaum | Lauren Thompson | January 19, 2018 |
The girls are on edge as they try to figure out who Caroline is and stop her before she hurts anyone else. Darbie and Kelly cook a spell to help them see and solve clues while Hannah works with Mr. Morris to figure out how Caroline is spelling people. When the lead in Darbie's "Murder Masquerade" play comes down with the flu, Darbie takes on the lead role. At first, Darbie suspects that Amy could be Caroline. Meanwhile, Kelly relistens to her grandmother's voicemail and realizes that Becky had figured out who Caroline is. During the play, Darbie pieces all the clues together and figures out that Caroline is in fact Jill, Terri's campaign manager. In a stunning performance, Darbie ad libs her lines to indirectly warn Kelly and Hannah about Jill. Realizing that the girls have figured out she's Caroline, Jill leaves the hall immediately.
| 39 | 26 | "Just Add Spices" | Joe Nussbaum | Andrew Orenstein | January 19, 2018 |
Kelly, Hannah and Darbie figure out that Caroline's spell is triggered when someone says the word "magic." They're unable to cook a counter spell because Caroline has already destroyed Mama P's spices. So, they settle for a truth protection spell. After betraying Terri and causing her to almost lose the election, Mama P. makes things right by exposing Lever's corruption. Terri becomes the Mayor of Saffron Falls. Meanwhile, the cookbook leads the girls to a garden full of spices. Jill arrives and reveals that she wanted them to lead her to the garden so that she can destroy it. She says that she's making people forget magic because magic ruined her life. After spelling the girls, Jill spells herself, turning back into Caroline with no memory of magic. Luckily, the girls' protection spell worked and they didn't actually forget magic. They cook a spell to resurrect the spice garden but since it requires cedronian, they understand that it will have a great cost such as losing the cookbook to new protectors.

=== Season 3 (2019) ===
| No. overall | No. in season | Title | Directed by | Written by | Original release date |
|---|---|---|---|---|---|
Part 1
| 40 | 1 | "Just Add Time Travel" | Joe Nussbaum | Andrew Orenstein | February 1, 2019 |
Surprisingly, the cookbook is fine and the repercussions of the girls spell is unknown. Grandma Becky, circa 1975, arrives in the girls' kitchen, after eating "A Guac Through Time." She talks to Ida (Mama P) and asks the girls why she is pretending not to know magic. The girls tell her about how she used her Morbium to remove the magical ties amongst the OC's when they began cursing each other. 1975 Becky is furious at herself and when she sees Grandma Becky come outside, the two walk toward each other and both disappear, as does their trailer. The girls go inside and find that their entire timeline has been altered -- Grandma Becky having disappeared when Kelly's dad, Scott, was a child. While out for a walk, Kelly discovers stone statues, all looking frightened. She sees a stone statue of Jake and rushes to Mama P's to talk to Ida. Gina Silvers has apparently been turning people into stone using her Marble cake. The girls make the Guac Through Time and arrive in 1975, in search of 1975 Becky in attempts to fix the timeline. 1975 Becky doesn't want to change the timeline due to the good things which happened in 1975, unaware of the bad repercussions of her changes. Eventually, the girls manage to convince her to change, and 1975 Becky wipes her own memory as well as 1975 Gina and Ida's to return everything back. Realising that they need to destroy a 'Keep The Cookbook Casserole' recipe Ida made so the other future doesn't happen, Kelly rips up the paper and throws it down a waterfall.
| 41 | 2 | "Just Add Plants" | Jon Rosenbaum | Andrew Orenstein | February 1, 2019 |
Weeds begin growing all over town. Ida has sold Mama P's and cannot be found. Jake is disappointed with his new work environment: Corporate rock required to be played in the facility, pre-made food delivered each morning instead of being prepared fresh in the kitchen. The girls notice strange things happening -- and that everyone impacted had a smoothie from a food cart in the park, Andy's Organic. Mayor Terri has been given gifts from companies all over town. She is given a free smoothie, then the owner asks her for a favor with acquiring permits. She expresses that "the mayor does not accept bribes," pays for the drink, and leaves. The girls arrive at the organic food cart and the owner seems confused by their accusations of using magic. They leave, without figuring out what's going on. The girls discover a weed growing in Andy's garden, then notice that everyone's yards and gardens on the street also have magical plants growing in them. They collect as many weeds as they can, then try to un-spell everyone who was spelled, the day before. Later in the afternoon, they notice magic plants and weeds growing all over the entire neighborhood, growing at an alarming rate. They cook up a spell to eradicate the plants. The girls go back to their harvest and notice that the night-blooming mint has gone missing, Kelly says she believes this is the repercussion of their spell.
| 42 | 3 | "Just Add Codes" | Jon Rosenbaum | John-Paul Nickel | February 1, 2019 |
Ida is on an island, on vacation. Jake's new boss, Erin, is seen talking to Ida and it is discovered that Erin is after Morbium, she stole the night-blooming mint, and that she is returning Ida's magic memory. Ida gives her a recipe to cook up an attraction spell so she can attract the Morbium. Just as she tastes the spell, an earthquake hits the town, shifting rocks to reveal an old, secret door with the name "Peizer" carved into the wood, in the forest. The girls think this underground cellar may be Chuck's hidden spice bunker. They cook up a recipe to help them find a way to get inside. Meanwhile, Gina Silvers happens upon her magical recipe cards in her kitchen. She also finds a note from 1970's Becky saying that she won't apologize for what she did to Gina. Gina asks her what she did to her, but Becky can't remember. Erin tells Jake she plans to knock down the wall in the new restaurant to add a drive-through – the wall that happens to be Ida's secret spice pantry. Gina throws out her old recipe cards and a book, saying she doesn't want to live in the past. Jake meets Erin's daughter, Zoe. Jake goes to Mayor Terri and tells her about Erin's plan to put in a drive-through. Erin decides not to add it, after all. The girls make it inside of Chuck's cellar, nothing suspicious. The girls ruin piper’s escape room party by solving everything. They return Chuck's cellar again, to discover a secret entrance, hidden in plain site, into a different part of the cellar, where they think Chuck kept his spices. Everything is missing, except for a golden pocket watch, that is engraved with the fork-knife-and-spoon symbol.
| 43 | 4 | "Just Add Piper" | Aprill Winney | Lauren Thompson | February 1, 2019 |
Piper is upset at Darbie for ruining her escape room party. Darbie is distraught and tells Kelly and Hannah that she is going to tell Piper about their magic. Kelly protests immediately. Hannah is wary. Kelly says they have more important problems to solve, like opening the pocket watch. Darbie leaves, upset that they aren't supportive, and that they are constantly busy with magic. Kelly and Hannah decide to cook without Darbie, and invite Piper over. Darbie goes to Jake to talk about her wanting to tell Piper about the magic, forgetting that Jake's memory of magic is still erased. Hannah and Kelly take a bite of their recipe, just as Piper arrives. Kelly and Hannah apologize to Piper for their behaviour at her party. Piper is upset at them for ruining her party and for wasting her time. As she goes to leave, Kelly and Hannah get stuck to Piper instead of the locket becoming unstuck. The girls all agree to tell Piper about the magic so that she will forgive Darbie. Piper helps them open the pocket watch. The pocket watch didn’t have hands. Erin has the memory-removing drink and threatens to take away Ida's magic memory, which she ultimately does.
| 44 | 5 | "Just Add Rot" | Joe Nussbaum | Denise Moss | February 1, 2019 |
A fresh apple and banana that Kelly touches instantly become moldy. Hannah and Darbie arrive at Kelly's house, with moldy food in their hands, too. It impacts food through oven mitts and even on forks. With the help of Piper, the girls cook up a recipe that gives Gina back her memory of magic. They dig through Gina's trash and Piper finds Gina's notebook for pollinating spices. Becky and Mayor Terri go to Chuck's cellar to help survey the movement of the artifacts to the museum. There, the team discovers modern-day shoe-prints. Becky find an earring in the dirt and discovers that it belongs to Kelly. She is disappointed in her granddaughter. She confronts her, saying that if this type of behavior continues, she will tell her parents about her disobedience, and gives the earring back. Scott is upset with Kelly for not cleaning up the kitchen earlier in the day and grounds her. The girls bake pretzels that help them track a thief. The thief turns out to be Erin.
| 45 | 6 | "Just Add Tomorrow" | Aprill Winney | Aminta Goyel | February 1, 2019 |
Erin returns to Ida, who has been given back her magic memory. She eats something that gives her the ability to make a hole in a glass pitcher, just by touching it. The girls try to get to know Zoe, Erin's daughter, but run into problems. At school, Hannah's new friend Leah posts a video of a girl struggling to get her sweater unstuck from her locker, that she recorded on Hannah's phone. Hannah is upset. Darbie doesn't fare well either: She forgets it is picture day, fails a test, and gets detention. A pie tin is discovered stolen from the Peizer family historical display in the museum. The girls decide to make the do-over spell strong enough to restart the day, from the morning, so that Hannah does not give Leah her phone, Darbie can look nice for picture day and not fail a test or get detention, and ultimately, so they can stop the pie tin from being stolen. Darbie wears the same outfit another student is wearing and also forgot to study; Kelly gives water to Zoe and is invited to run next to her, then zooms off; Hannah doesn't give her phone to Leah and now Leah posts a mean meme online about being a teacher's pet to cyberbully Hannah for not letting her record the struggling girl, earlier in the day. Darbie distracts Erin at the unveiling of the Peizer's relics. The pie tin remained safely inside the display – except that, as the clock struck 9 pm, the same day started over again. Eventually, Kelly realises she put the oven on the wrong temperature leading her to tell the others they will relive the day over and over until they do the same actions as the original day. They do the same actions, and the tin is stolen, but Hannah is unable to bring herself to bully the girl, despite this the loop ends. Erin reveals to Mama P that she knew about the loop and spelled Kelly's muffins to end it after the girls chose to copy the original day.
| 46 | 7 | "Just Add Perspective" | Gregory Guzik | Taylor Cox & Jacquie Walters | February 1, 2019 |
Erin cooks a spell to retrieve the Morbium seed from Chuck's pie tin. With Jake's help, Kelly, Hannah, Darbie and Piper sneak into the coffeeshop to look for the pie tin but can't find it. To figure out what Erin is doing with the pie tin, the girls cook a POV popcorn spell to see from Erin's perspective. Surprisingly, Erin brings the pie tin to the Quinn's house. Hannah uses the spell to spy on Leah who has been cyberbullying her. Leah invites Hannah to join her but intentionally texts her the wrong address. Piper and Darbie use the popcorn on Hannah only to find her crying. They try to get Hannah to open up about the bullying but she doesn't. After seeing all the magical spices in Kelly's trailer, Becky becomes worried about what Kelly is up to. Later, while looking at Springtown's security camera footage, Jake and the girls discover that the Night Bandit is in fact someone else pretending to be Erin.
| 47 | 8 | "Just Add Karma" | Jason Shipman | Marque Franklin-Williams | February 1, 2019 |
Worried about Hannah getting bullied by Leah all the time, Darbie cooks a karma spell so that whenever Leah does something mean to Hannah, the same thing happens to her as well. Hannah and Ms. Silvers become suspicious and confront Darbie about it. Darbie explains that she was watching out for Hannah since Leah made Hannah cry. Darbie and Silvers help Hannah realize that she can always come to them. Meanwhile, the Night Bandit tries to replicate the Morbium but it doesn't work. She goes back to Mama P. who clarifies that the spell needs to be cooked by all three protectors. When the Night Bandit says that she will make "the others" cook with her, Mama P. figures out that the Night Bandit is in fact Kelly. Ousted, Kelly explains that she is doing it to keep the book from wrong hands. She decides to trick Hannah and Darbie into cooking the spell to keep the book forever by lying to them that it would unmask the Night Bandit.
| 48 | 9 | "Just Add Surprise" | Gregory Guzik | Denise Moss | February 1, 2019 |
Hannah and Darbie throw Kelly a surprise early birthday party, interfering with her plans to trick them into cooking the spell to keep the cookbook forever. To end the party, Kelly cooks a spell to make it the worst party but she spells herself instead, turning it into a never-ending party. When Piper finds the Morbium in the trailer, Kelly spells her to forget magic. On realizing that it was Kelly who spelled her own party, Darbie and Hannah begin to suspect that Kelly might be the Night Bandit who has been spelling them but Kelly throws them off her scent. However, after the party, their fears are confirmed after finding that spell Kelly wants them to cook is a mislabelled copy of the "Keep the Cookbook Casserole" spell, which she supposedly destroyed. Back on the island, Mama P. finds a note she wrote to remind herself to eat the quiche in order to remember magic. She decides to come back to warn Hannah and Darbie about Kelly.
| 49 | 10 | "Just Add Kelly" | Anne Renton | Lauren Thompson | February 1, 2019 |
After discovering that Kelly is the Night Bandit, Hannah and Darbie tell Ms. Silvers. They restore Becky's memories of magic and she suggests a spell to get inside Kelly's mind to see what's wrong with her. Mama P. returns to warn them about Kelly but they already know. During a sleepover at Kelly's, Darbie and Hannah keep stalling to avoid cooking. After Kelly falls asleep, they use the spell to get into Kelly's mind. They find that she has been acting that way because her mind got poisoned as the repercussion of when she used cedronian to regrow the spice garden. They realize that the poison has been twisting Kelly's perspectives to make her think that Hannah and Darbie won't be her friends without the magic. The next morning, Hannah and Darbie cook a spell to show Kelly the truth. This restores Kelly back to herself. She apologizes but reveals that she had used a sleepwalking spell to get them to cook the spell. They're now tied to the book forever.
| 50 | 11 | "Just Add Goodbye" | Joe Nussbaum | John-Paul Nickel | February 1, 2019 |
Kelly's grandmother disappears as a downside of the spell that Kelly, Hannah and Darbie cooked to make the cookbook their property. Gina and Ida warn that once the spell becomes permanent, they would lose Becky forever. Since the book is the girl's property now, it automatically creates the counter-spell they need using Jake's recipe. However, the spell calls for a Parquinnien, a spice family they've never heard of. They travel to the 1800s to ask Chuck but he tells them that Parquinnien doesn't exist. They realize that they can create Parquinnien by blending three magic plant roots. However, it would take fifteen years for it to grow. So, they travel to the future to get the spice plant from their future selves. After breaking the bond with the cookbook, it erases only parts of their names in the book, making them realize that Parquinnien is a combination of their last names (Parker-Kent, Quinn, Obrien). named after them. After that, Kelly, Hannah and Darbie agree that they're ready for the book to move on to new protectors.
Part 2
| 51 | 12 | "Just Add Magic: New Protectors" | Joe Nussbaum | Andrew Orenstein | October 25, 2019 |
The cookbook has moved on to new protectors - Zoe, Erin's daughter finds it while unpacking after moving to Bay City. Since she had seen the book with Kelly, she mails it back to her. Kelly, Hannah and Darbie take a trip to Bay City to help Zoe realize that she's the new protector and what that means. Zoe doesn't believe them, but when a snowstorm threatens to ruin her mother's wedding, she gives the book a try. She cooks a spell to heat up the weather but it also heats up everyone's emotions, causing people to fight for no reason. She teams up with her new stepbrother Leo, and their neighbor Ish, to cook a counterspell. Zoe, Ish and Leo become the new protectors of the book. Kelly, Hannah and Darbie teach them about magic, explaining that certain spells have downsides; they also give them notes and charts about spice families.

=== Mystery City (2020) ===
| No. | Title | Directed by | Written by | Original release date |
|---|---|---|---|---|
| 1 | "Just Add Opposites" | Joe Nussbaum | Andrew Orenstein | January 17, 2020 |
Zoe, Ish and Leo say to Erin (Zoe’s mom) that they would help her move boxes. As the boxes are heavy, they cook “Pick It Up Pancakes”. The boxes are still heavy, so they help each other lift boxes. Then they find out that due to uncoordinated work, they ended up making a new recipe which make them do opposites. The riddle in it is not legible. They all go to family dinner, there Leo finds that they had to read the riddle through water. The riddle says “Reverse the Command”. They make Ish’s nani, who doesn’t know English, repeat it. Next day they change the boxes. There was a box of Zoe’s father’s things for Zoe. Zoe’s father’s handwriting was in the book.They find out that Zoe’s father may have been a protector.
| 2 | "Just Add Numbers" | Anne Renton | Denise Moss | January 17, 2020 |
Zoe finds a blueprint, which was her father’s. It is a blueprint of a library. There they find a diary. The diary says that the Wesson brothers (one of the protectors) found gold in saffron falls. They become greedy and made a bread which attracts gold. They used to take a piece of dough an store it for the next day, which is called starter. By time, the starter become very powerful and destructive. The starter is hidden as it was impossible to destroy. We have to find 3 coins in order to get the starter. The first clue is “Cassie runs around Mabel, until you tell her the truth”. Zoe, Ish and Leo have to find the starter and destroy it.
| 3 | "Just Add Dad" | Otto Penzato | Jacquie Walters & Taylor Cox | January 17, 2020 |
Zoe learns from her mother that when she was 2, she would go with her dad to Mabel Gordon Park. To remember those memories, they cook “Early Memory Mashed Bananas”. In her memory there is a carousel. When they go to the park, Zoe’s memory shows that Cassie is a horse in the carousel. They find Cassie and try to tell a secret, thinking that it is the truth mentioned in the riddle. As it didn’t work they say the Elysian, the truth spice. It works and they get a box with the first con from Cassie’s mouth.
| 4 | "Just Add Coin" | Alison McDonald | Aminta Goyel | January 17, 2020 |
After they learn that Ish’s friend Lexi is a Wesson. The trio hide the magical coin. In the process, Hide N’ Leek begins to hide other important items from their life, including the cookbook. With what they know about magic, they made a counter spell. The counter spell bought back all the things, except Ish’s phone. It turns out Lexi took it. Even though Lexi gives back Ish’s phone, they have got the information. What are the Wessons going to do with all the information about magic from Ish’s phone?
| 5 | "Just Add Volume" | Kimmy Gatewood | Marque Franklin-Williams | January 17, 2020 |
The trio find that the box in which the coin in is a music box, but they cannot hear the music. So, the protectors cook a super-hearing spell in order to hear what song a silent music box is playing. Even though they hear the music, it is a mess. Later, Ish figures out that it isn’t about the notes but it’s order. When unscrambled, it spelled "A-D-A D-E-C-A-G-E". This means the opera house where Ada Decage was. When they get there, the Wessons have got the coin. The trio find out that the Wessons have been spying on them with bubble gum.
| 6 | "Just Add Grown-Ups" | Keith Samples | Lauren Thompson | January 17, 2020 |
Zoe, Ish and Leo cook a spell to be grown ups. Zoe interviews her dad’s best friend, to find out that nothing about his childhood is known and he made everything, including his name. Ish and Leo go to Pierce’s office to get information. They get many photos of letters, and the Wesson brothers, when they were protectors, the second coin, etc. Zoe later thinks that her dad is Ian, the protector who hid the starter. Because Ian left to hide the starter when he was 18, and her dad basically didn’t exist till he met Erin (Zoe’s mom) when he was 18.
| 7 | "Just Add Foresight" | Keith Samples | Jacquie Walters, Taylor Cox & Mackenzie Moore | January 17, 2020 |
The trio cooks up a magic recipe that allows them to see into the future to stay a step ahead of the Wessons. They see the coin in the pictures and later figure out that the symbol means water and they had to dip the coin in water. They intend to call Lexi and give the clue by discussing it and as if the phone was accidental. With the foresight, they discover the clue, The Aquarium of Bay City. They go to the Aquarium, to find out that Wessons haven’t come yet. But when they get inside the aquarium, the Wessons follow them. The trio find the 3rd coin before the Wessons.
| 8 | "Just Add Color" | Joe Nussbaum | Aminta Goyel | January 17, 2020 |
Lexi gives back the coin the Wessons had. The trio trust Lexi. When they put the coin on top of each other, a recipe shows up. They cook it. When they eat it, everything turns black and white. Ish, Zoe and Leo see number 17, Zoe’s mother and birds respectively in colour. When Zoe’s mother said that those coins were subway tokens, she turned black and white. The trio try to check out the coins again. But they are stolen by Lexi. Lexi returns the coins and asks them to check out an antique store. The clues fit there. The put all 3 coins in the 17th Subway ticket turnstile. They get a subway ticket. The subway leaves from Unity station.
| 9 | "Just Add Waffles" | Joe Nussbaum | Denise Moss | January 17, 2020 |
Unity station is an old station which is closed. Zoe, Ish and Leo try to get there by cooking “Walk Through Wall-fles” but every time they reach home. Kelly, Hannah and Darbie meet Chuck who says that the handless pocket watch is a clue. The hands for the clock are in Zoe’s necklace. When the hands are on, it stops at 7:13, which is when they get off the subway. There are 2 pillars, which was not in the photo taken when the subway was open. They touch all 3 pillars, which forms a triangle, and get the Starter.
| 10 | "Just Add Goodbyes" | Joe Nussbaum | John-Paul Nickel | January 17, 2020 |
Kelly, Hannah, Darbie, Zoe, Ish and Leo try to cook the starter in water with magical ingredients to destroy it, but they cannot. The Kelly, Zoe and Darbie go the past when Ian tied to destroy it, but nothing different, they think of cooking with it. Meanwhile, the Wessons steal the starter and cook the sourdough recipe. It results in current down, subway stops working, electronic things stop working and buildings collapse. Leo and Darbie make a plan. The protectors stop time, teleport everyone out of buildings and subways and fix the metals in buildings using magic. The Wessons regret about what they did and return the starter. With the idea from past, the protectors - both previous and current - cook the starter to spread what they have, MAGIC
