= Just Add Magic (TV series) =

Television series

- Just Add Magic
- Genre: Kids & Family; Fantasy; Drama
- Based on: Just Add Magic by Cindy Callaghan
- Developed by: Joanna Lewis; Kristine Songco
- Starring: Olivia Sanabia; Abby Donnelly; Aubrey Miller; Judah Bellamy; Catia Ojeda; Andrew Burlinson; Dee Wallace; Amy Hill; Ellen Karsten; Aiden Lovekamp
- Composers: Deborah Lurie; Zack Ryan
- Country of origin: United States
- Original language: English
- No. of seasons: 3 (not including Mystery City)
- No. of episodes: 51 (61 if Mystery City is included) (list of episodes)

Production
- Executive producers: Joe Nussbaum; Andrew Orenstein
- Producer: Pixie Wespiser
- Cinematography: Mark Doering-Powell
- Running time: 23–27 minutes
- Production companies: Amazon Studios; Picrow; Grasshopper Lane Entertainment

Original release
- Network: Amazon Prime Video
- Release: January 15, 2015 – January 17, 2020

Related
- Just Add Magic: Mystery City

Just Add Magic is an American live-action family television series, loosely based on the 2010 book of the same name by Cindy Callaghan. It was produced by Amazon Studios. A pilot was produced in 2015 and the series commissioned for a full season the following year. Amazon renewed the series for a second season in June 2016 after it "set a record as the most successful Amazon Original Kids premiere weekend in terms of U.S. Prime Video streams and hours."

A follow-up series, Just Add Magic: Mystery City, was released on January 17, 2020.

== Plot ==
=== Season 1 ===
In the town of Saffron Falls, three teenage best friends— Kelly, Hannah, and Darbie - share a passion for baking. Their lives take a magical turn when they stumble upon an ancient cookbook filled with whimsical recipes and mystical ingredients.

Intrigued by the cookbook's secrets, the girls embark on an adventure, visiting Mama P's shop to procure ingredients like "Cedronian vanilla" and "Taurian thyme." As they experiment with the cookbook's magical recipes, they discover their role as protectors of this culinary treasure, a responsibility that has been passed down through generations.

Kelly is driven by a heartfelt mission: to find a magical recipe that can lift her grandmother's curse. Meanwhile, Mama P is bound by a curse that confines her to Saffron Falls, and Ms. Silvers is unable to play the piano in public due to her own curse.

As Kelly seeks a cure for her grandmother, she forms an unlikely alliance with Mama P, who is also eager to break free from her curse. However, their efforts are met with resistance from Hannah, who fears the consequences of their magical endeavors.

In a surprising twist, Mama P successfully breaks her curse but inadvertently places the entire town under a new curse, where everybody is frozen. To undo this, the trio must concoct a special recipe. They decide to make a magical layered cake which manages to break the curse in the city, but it also brings back Chuck, a resident who was cursed unintentionally by magical mishaps.

=== Season 2 ===
==== Part 1 ====
After breaking every curse, they realised that they had brought back Chuck Hankins, a teenage boy from the ’60s who had suddenly disappeared because of the OCs, Original Cooks; Becky, Mama P, Ms. Gina Silvers, who were all once the protectors of the cookbook. Chuck casts an invisibility spell on a trailer but, the girls are able to see and enter the invisible trailer. There they discover that Chuck has another cookbook that is copying recipes from their cookbook, so they steal it. Later the original cooks put a spell on Chuck, and he retaliates with spells of his own. Eventually, they break Chuck's Immortality Spell, also breaking Rose's, (Chuck's sister) and frees her from the book. Chuck and Rose go back in time and live out their lives.

==== Part 2 ====
The book and spices are stolen from Kelly's backpack. Kelly, Hannah, and Darbie meet a previous protector from the '90s named RJ. With Jake's help, they are able to get the book back. The girls become suspicious of Mr. Morris, Hannah's teacher at Fox Canyon for erasing everyone's memories of magic but it was not him, it was Caroline, a former protector of the cookbook, who was also disguised as Jill, Mrs. Quinn's campaign manager. The trio take precautionary measures to stop Caroline from casting spells on them and destroying their spices, despite the consequences Cedronian vanilla could bring them.

=== Season 3 ===
==== Part 1 ====
Mama P's has been bought by a coffee chain called Springtown Coffee. Kelly, Hannah, and Darbie become suspicious of the manager Erin Chua. They soon notice clues of someone who knows that magic is real, even after all memories of magic have been erased. This someone, steals their newly harvested Night Blooming spices, and is therefore, dubbed the "Night Bandit". The girls meet Darbie's friend, Piper, and they introduce her to magic. The four of them work together to find the Night Bandit. It turns out that Kelly is actually the Night Bandit and she was poisoned by the spell that brought back the garden in the previous season, Come Back Kombucha Tea. In the final episode, the spell on her is broken, but the girls needed to save Grandma Becky after she disappears. They go forward in time and save her, therefore, also creating a new spice named "Parquinnien" which is a blend of their last names, Hannah Parker-Kent, Kelly Quinn, Darbie O'Brien. The cookbook moves on to Erin's daughter, Zoe and one of the new protectors.

==== Part 2 ====
The cookbook has moved on to the new protectors; Erin's daughter, Zoe, Zoe's neighbor, Ish and Zoe's step-brother, Leo. With the help of Kelly, Darbie and Hannah, the new trio are convinced that magic exists and able to go through troubling times together.

=== Just Add Magic: Mystery City (2020) ===
In the spin-off series, the new protectors, Zoe, Ish and Leo are set to solve their first mystery. Zoe, wanting to learn more about her father who had died when she was two years old, uncovers a book at the library that had been associated with him. The book tells a story from the late 1800s, narrated from the point of view of Ian Maddox, who was then a protector along with brothers Clint and Folsom Wesson. The Wesson brothers grew power-hungry and created a magical sourdough starter that would help them get large quantities of gold, but the downside of the spell was that it caused mass destruction. With Charles Peizer's assistance, Ian Maddox traveled to the future to hide the starter from the Wesson brothers. Zoe, Ish, and Leo find themselves in a race against the Wessons' descendants to find the sourdough starter. Their goal is to find three coins that will help them discover where the starter is and then destroy it once and for all - if the Wessons do not get to it first. Towards the end, with the help of Kelly, Darbie and Hannah, the trio is successful in saving the world by using the sourdough starter to distribute the magic from the book throughout the globe.

== Cast and characters ==
=== Main ===
- Olivia Sanabia as Kelly Quinn: New protector of the Cookbook. Of the new trio, she is the first to discover the power of the Cookbook. She enjoys playing basketball. She is very loyal and takes her role in magic very seriously.
- Abby Donnelly as Darbie O'Brien: New protector of the Cookbook. She is known for being clumsy and fun. Darbie plays basketball and participates in theatre (season 2) and is also interested in superheroes.
- Aubrey Miller as Hannah Parker-Kent: New protector of the Cookbook. She is very smart and begins attending a different and more selective school in the second season. Hannah enjoys playing piano and takes lessons from Ms Silvers. She is also concerned about being healthy.
- Judah Bellamy as Jake Williams III: Kelly, Hannah, and Darbie's friend who works at Mama P's Cafe and later has his own business selling food on his food bike. He often helps the girls cook and get supplies for their recipes and is very fun.
- Catia Ojeda as Terri Quinn: Kelly's mom who becomes town Mayor after defeating Adam Lever.
- Andrew Burlinson as Scott Quinn: Kelly's dad and Becky's son. He is very concerned when his mother is ill and is often shown as a being playful with his children.
- Dee Wallace as Grandma Becky Quinn: Kelly's grandma who was a protector when she was around Kelly's age. She used powerful magic to break her bond to the book. She is very caring and friendly.
- Amy Hill as Ida "Mama P" Perez: Cafe owner and previous protector of the book. Due to a curse on her, she was unable to leave town for many years. She often acts selfishly but is good deep within.
- Ellen Karsten as Ms. Gina Silvers: Music teacher and previous protector of the book. Due to a curse on her, she was unable to play piano in public for years.
- Aiden Lovekamp as Buddy Quinn: Kelly's younger brother who enjoys playing sports and pestering his sister, but he still loves his big sister.

=== Recurring ===
- Mira Furlan as The Traveler: The keeper of the cookbook who occasionally appears to give advice to the protectors
- Zach Callison as Chuck Hankins/Charles Peizer: Previous protector from the 1800s who made a great mistake (accidentally trapping his sister in the cookbook) and spent years trying to reverse it.
- Jeremy Guskin as RJ: Previous protector from the 1990s who attempted to become rich and popular using magic
- Felisha Terrell as Nöelle Jasper: Previous protector from the 1990s who attempted to use magic to boost her restaurant business
- Sprague Grayden as Caroline (Jill): Previous protector from the 1990s who attempted to erase magic from the world.
- Usman Ally as Mr. Morris: Hannah's teacher who helped the group of protectors from the 1990s with their recipes.
- Tess Paras as Erin: Springtown Coffee manager who takes over Mama P's Cafe for a time.
- Jolie Hoang-Rappaport as Zoe: Erin's daughter who later becomes a protector of the cookbook.
- Jen Drohan as Amy: Mr. O'Brien's girlfriend

=== Just Add Magic: Mystery City ===
==== Main ====
- Jolie Hoang-Rappaport as Zoe: Erin's daughter who later becomes a protector of the cookbook. Zoe also appears in Just Add Magic (Before Just Add Magic: New Protectors, along with her mother Erin).
- Tyler Sanders as Leo: New protector of the cookbook and Zoe's stepbrother. Leo is Nick's son and Zoe's step-brother. Leo is very interested in superheroes and art.
- Jenna Qureshi as Ish: New protector of the cookbook. She is Zoe and Leo's neighbor.
- Matt Dellapina as Nick: Erin's new husband who owns his own restaurant
- Tess Paras as Erin: Zoe's mother and a Springtown Coffee manager who takes over Mama P's Cafe for a time and later moves to Bay City to marry Nick.
- James Urbaniak as Pierce Hamilton: The villain of the story who is desperate to beat Zoe, Leo, and Ish in solving the mystery
- Casey Simpson as Cody Hamilton: Pierce's son who likes spending time with his family solving the mystery.
- Sydney Taylor as Lexi Hamilton: Pierce's daughter who is good friends with Ish.

==== Recurring ====
- Shane Harper as Ian Maddox: Past protector revealed to be Zoe's father and Erin's late husband.

== Episodes ==
Season	Episodes		Originally released	
Season	Episodes		First released	Last released
1	13		January 15, 2015	January 14, 2016
2	26	13	October 14, 2016	January 12, 2017
2	26	13	January 19, 2018	
3	12	11	February 1, 2019	
3	12	1	October 25, 2019	

Mystery City

Season	Episodes	Originally released
1	10	January 17, 2020

== Production and release ==
On January 4, 2018, a trailer was released announcing more episodes, which premiered on Amazon on January 19, 2018, as an extension of the second season.

On January 11, 2019, a trailer was released announcing the third season, which premiered on February 1.

The series aired on Universal Kids from June 9, 2019, to November 22, 2019.

On September 20, 2019, an announcement was made that a Just Add Magic special would come out on October 25.

== Reception ==
Angela Arsenault of Decider.com positively reviewed the first season of the series, calling it "A More Than Worthy Addition To The Teenage Witch Sub-Genre[.]" Jessica Jernigan also gave the second season a positive review, saying that "[d]arkness and danger is leavened with humor. And the supernatural elements are amplifications of real-life situations and experiences. By the season finale, it’s not just magic that saves the day—it’s also humanity." Giving the first season 4/5 stars, Emily Ashby of Common Sense Media noted that

[t]his enjoyable drama series has many good qualities, from a solid trio of friends in the forefront to how carefully the story respects multigenerational family units and traditions. Kelly [the main character] is the product of a loving home and loyal friends, and both influences guide her decisions. That doesn't mean she's perfect at every turn, and her decision to dabble in magic unsupervised raises some issues parents and kids can discuss, but the fact that she's motivated by compassion more than mere curiosity works in her favor.
