= Cindy Callaghan =

American author of children's books (born c. 1976)

- Born: c. 1976 (age 49–50); United States
- Education: University of Southern California; University of Delaware (BA & MBA)
- Occupation: Author
- Writing career
- Notable work: Just Add Magic
- Website: cindycallaghan.com

Cindy Callaghan (born c. 1976) is an American author of children's books who has written several middle-grade novels. Her first book, Just Add Magic, was adapted into an Amazon television series by the same name.

== Early life ==
Callaghan grew up in Oakland and Franklin Lakes, New Jersey. While living in Oakland, she attended Heights Elementary School before her family moved to Franklin Lakes. Callaghan transferred to Colonial Road School, and later attended Franklin Avenue Middle School and Indian Hills High School, where she graduated in 1988. After high school, she attended the University of Southern California to study film. She later went to the University of Delaware where she graduated with a bachelor's in English and French in 1992. She went on to earn her Master of Business Administration degree from Delaware in 1996.

== Career ==
Callaghan worked in the pharmaceutical industry for nearly 20 years. She began writing her first book, Just Add Magic, in 2003. The book tells the story of the 12-year-old main character Kelly Quinn and her two friends who find an old book containing magical recipes. In 2010, Just Add Magic was published by Simon & Schuster's Aladdin Mix. Callaghan also wrote a second book Sydney MacKenzie Knocks 'Em Dead, which initially did not get picked up for publication.

In October 2013, Simon & Schuster published another book by Callaghan entitled Lost in London. The book is a mystery about a girl named Jordan who embarks on an adventure in London. In 2014, Callaghan followed that with another book set in Europe; Lucky Me, republished in 2016 as Lost in Ireland, is about a teenage girl who travels to Ireland in the hopes of breaking a string of bad luck caused by a chain letter. Callaghan published three more "Lost In" books: Lost in Paris in March 2015, Lost in Rome in August 2015, and Lost in Hollywood in 2016.

In January 2015, Amazon Prime Video released a pilot episode of Just Add Magic to determine if a full series based on the book would be produced. As of 2014, Callaghan served as a consultant on the show, writing outlines and giving guidance to the producers. The series was picked up for a full season set to air in 2016. In June 2016, Amazon extended the television series for a second season. The second half of Season 2 of the series was released in January 2018.

In 2017, Callaghan's Sydney MacKenzie Knocks 'Em Dead won the Agatha Award for Best Children's/Young Adult.

In 2018, Cindy's Potion Problems (Just Add Magic) won the Agatha Award for Best Children's/Young Adult Mystery.

In 2020, Callaghan will be releasing a new book titled Saltwater Secrets.

Callaghan lives in Wilmington, Delaware which also serves as the setting of some of her books.

== Bibliography ==
=== Just Add Magic ===
- Just Add Magic (2010)
- Just Add Magic 2: Potion Problems (2018)

=== Lost In... ===
- Lost in London (2013)
- Lost in Ireland, previously titled Lucky Me (2014)
- Lost in Paris (2015)
- Lost in Rome (2015)
- Lost in Hollywood (2016)

=== Standalone ===
- Sydney MacKenzie Knocks 'Em Dead (2017) – 2017 Agatha Award Winner
