= Just Add Magic =

2010 book by Cindy Callaghan

- Author: Cindy Callaghan
- Language: English
- Genre: Juvenile Fantasy
- Published: 2010, (Aladdin)
- Publication place: US
- Pages: 240
- ISBN: 978-1-4424-0268-3

Just Add Magic is a 2010 fictional juvenile novel by Cindy Callaghan. It tells the story of three young friends, who find a mysterious and magical cookbook and create a secret cooking club with food and drinks which they eat and magic stuff happens to them and they solve mysteries and problems. It was followed up by the 2018 book Potion Problems. Amazon Studios adapted the book into a series of the same name.

== Plot ==
Best friends Kelly, Darbie and Hannah find an old cookbook with a photo of Kelly’s grandmother and her two friends in Kelly's attic. In it, they find that the entries have been covered up by recipes with strange names like "Shut 'Em Up Shortcake" and "Hazelnut Healing Tart". This is the excuse Kelly has been looking for to start a cooking club with Darbie and Hannah. They have to keep this cookbook a secret so that the magic doesn't fall into wrong hands.

Kelly's little brother eats some of the shortcake and is unable to speak. Hannah eats some of the shortcake and can't talk either. Darbie added the cedronian vanilla while preparing the shortcake which means as a sacrifice, she has to keep talking incessantly until the spell breaks. Kelly and Darbie think there's something magical about these recipes, but Hannah remains skeptical.

The three friends find themselves having some bad luck after using the recipes. They befriend an elderly woman named Mama P (Ida Perez), the owner of the cafe “MaMa P's”, a popular cafe where they buy the exotic ingredients needed for the magical recipes. She teaches them about the Law of Returns and they decide to perform (sometimes difficult) good deeds around their town to balance things out. Kelly’s grandmother, Rebecca Quinn (nee Patterson) loses the ability to talk and is diagnosed with a mental health disorder.

Mama P tells them that she has been spelled by Miss Gina Silvers, a creepy old woman who lives alone in a spooky house, often sitting on her front porch scaring people. Many believe that Gina is a Witch. Mama P says that she will help them fight Miss Silvers and break the spell on Kelly’s grandma. But she does not tell them she has been under a spell as well and cannot get out of the town. Finally the girls cook their own spell called LAST DITCH LAYER CAKE which breaks away all the curses in town. They also find out they broke the curse of Chuck Hankins who had disappeared after eating a magical candied apple given to him by Becky, Kelly's Grandmother. They find out Kelly's grandma cursed herself. They also find out Mama P is evil, not Miss Silvers.

== Adaptation ==
Amazon Studios adapted the novel for the 2015 pilot season and later ordered a full season based on the response.
