= List of people from Teaneck, New Jersey =

The following is a list of notable current and former residents of Teaneck, New Jersey.

(B) denotes that the person was born in Teaneck.

== Academics and science ==
- Robert S. Browne (1924-2004), economist who founded African-American self-help programs
- Frank Chapman (1864–1945), ornithologist
- Stephen P. Cohen (1945–2017), scholar on Middle Eastern affairs who founded the Institute for Middle East Peace and Development
- Herbert Dardik (1935–2020), vascular surgeon who served as the chief of vascular surgery at Englewood Hospital and Medical Center
- Frank Gill (born 1941), ornithologist
- Alan Kadish (born 1956), president and CEO of Touro College
- Peter Kenen (1932–2012), economist who served as provost of Columbia University
- Karl Meyer (1899–1990), German-born biochemist
- Clifford Nass (1958–2013), professor at Stanford University; expert on human-computer interaction
- Jane S. Richardson (born 1941), biochemist and developer of ribbon diagrams of protein structure
- Jacob J. Schacter (born 1950), senior scholar at the Center for the Jewish Future at Yeshiva University; editor of a number of volumes about Rabbi Joseph Soloveitchik
- Lawrence Solan (1952–2024), Don Forchelli Professor of Law and Director of the Center for the Study of Law, Language and Cognition at Brooklyn Law School
- Benjamin Sommer (born 1964), Professor of Bible at The Jewish Theological Seminary of America and a Senior Fellow at the Shalom Hartman Institute
- Yvonne Thornton (born 1947), physician and author
- Helen M. Walker (1891–1983), statistician and researcher; first female president of the American Statistical Association
- Alan Westin (1929–2013), Columbia University professor; pioneer in studying issues related to information privacy

== Arts ==
=== Architecture ===
- John H. Beyer (1933–2026), architect who was a founding partner of Beyer Blinder Belle and an advocate for historic preservation of the architecture of New York City
- Louis Bourgeois (1856–1930), architect of the Bahá'í House of Worship
- Alan Hantman (born 1942), architect who served as the 10th Architect of the Capitol, from February 1997 until February 2007

=== Authors, journalists and publishers ===
- Shalom Auslander (born 1970), author of Foreskin's Lament: A Memoir (2007)
- Peter Balakian (born 1951), poet, writer and academic
- Cathy Bao Bean (born 1942), author
- Jim Bishop (1907–1987), journalist and author of the bestselling book The Day Lincoln Was Shot
- Louis Black, co-founder of The Austin Chronicle and the annual South by Southwest film and music festival
- Don Bolles (1928–1976), investigative reporter killed in a Mob-related car bombing
- Richard Nelson Bolles (1927–2017), clergyman and author of the best-selling job-hunting book, What Color is Your Parachute?
- Rachel Kramer Bussel (born 1975), author, columnist and editor, specializing in erotica
- George Cain (1943–2010), author of Blueschild Baby
- Louise DeSalvo (1942–2018), author
- Shammai Engelmayer (born 1945), rabbi, journalist and author
- Howard Fast (1914–2003), novelist, author of Spartacus
- Jeff Gottesfeld (born 1956), author of Anne Frank and Me and The Tree in the Courtyard; screenwriter, Broken Bridges; television writer, The Young and the Restless
- Steven Hartov (born 1953), American-Israeli author of fiction and non-fiction works, journalist, screenwriter and lecturer in international security affairs
- Jeremiah Healy (1948–2014), crime novelist(B)
- David Heatley (born 1974), cartoonist, illustrator, graphic designer and musician
- Marilyn Henry (1953–2011), journalist, historian and archivist for matters pertaining to Holocaust reparations, survivor benefits and art looted by the Nazis
- Robert Hilferty (1959–2009), journalist, filmmaker and AIDS activist
- John Hoerr (1930–2015), journalist and historian best known for his work on organized labor, industry, and politics
- Mike Kelly, columnist for The Record; author of Color Lines, a book about the shooting of an African-American teenager by a white Teaneck police officer
- Neil Kleid (born 1975), cartoonist who received a 2003 Xeric Award grant for his graphic novella Ninety Candles (2004)
- Lisa Lucas, executive director of the National Book Foundation and senior vice president at Knopf Doubleday
- Barry N. Malzberg (1939–2024), science fiction author
- Brian Morton (born 1955), author of Starting Out in the Evening
- Nicholasa Mohr (born 1938), author and academic whose first novel Nilda was about the Nuyorican experience
- Gitl Schaechter-Viswanath (born 1958), Yiddish language poet
- John A. Williams (1925–2015), author, journalist and academic whose novel The Man Who Cried I Am was a bestseller in 1967

=== Fine arts ===
- Robert Barry (born 1936), conceptual artist
- Charles Harbutt (1935–2015), photographer
- Renaldo Kuhler (1931–2013), scientific illustrator(B)
- Thomas Nozkowski (1944–2019), contemporary painter(B)
- Frank R. Paul (1884–1963), illustrator of science fiction
- Scott Pleasants (born 1964), 1st poet laureate
- Claire Porter (born 1942), choreographer
- Paul Shambroom (born 1956), photographer
- Chuck Stewart (1927–2017), photographer
- Henry Wessel Jr. (1942–2018), photographer

=== Fashion ===
- Rachel Antonoff (born 1981), fashion designer(B)
- Marc Jacobs (born 1963), designer and artistic director for Louis Vuitton
- Lynn Kohlman (1946–2008), fashion model
- Henry Zankov (born 1980 or 1981), fashion designer raised in Teaneck

=== Movies, stage and television ===
- Amy Aquino (born 1957), television, film and stage actress who has appeared in TV series including Brooklyn Bridge, ER and Being Human(B)
- Ed Ames (1927–2023), popular singer and actor, known for playing Mingo in the television series Daniel Boone
- Paul Attanasio (born 1959), screenwriter and executive producer of the TV series House
- De'Adre Aziza (born 1977), Broadway stage actress
- Dana Bash (born 1971), CNN journalist
- Pat Battle (born 1959), WNBC-TV's New Jersey bureau reporter; weekend anchor for Today in New York
- Eitan Bernath (born 2002), celebrity chef
- Roger Birnbaum (born 1950), film producer who owns Spyglass Entertainment
- Ben Blank (1921–2009), television graphics innovator
- Philip Bosco (1930–2018), character actor
- Chris Brancato (born 1962), Hollywood writer and producer of Sci Fi Channel's First Wave and the film Species II
- Colleen Broomall (born 1983), actress and journalist
- Carolee Carmello (born 1962), actress best known for her performances in Broadway musicals
- Syd Cassyd (1908–2000), television pioneer who was the founder of the Academy of Television Arts & Sciences(B)
- Gaius Charles (born 1983), actor, Friday Night Lights
- Jennifer Cody (born 1969), actress
- Joe DiPietro (born 1961), playwright
- Jamie Donnelly (born 1947), actress best known as Jan, one of the Pink Ladies from the film version of Grease
- Sheldon Epps (born 1952), director and producer of television and theatrical works
- Hunter Foster (born 1969), Broadway actor
- Nely Galán (born 1963), independent producer, former president of entertainment for Telemundo, and creator of the FOX reality series The Swan
- John A. Gambling (1930–2004), radio personality
- John B. Gambling (1897–1974), radio personality
- Lee Garlington (born 1953), actress(B)
- Susan Gordon (1949–2011), child actress in film and television
- Jess Harnell (born 1963), the voice of Wakko Warner on Animaniacs and announcer of America's Funniest Home Videos
- Gavin Houston (born 1977), actor, best known for playing the role of Jeffrey Harrington on the Oprah Winfrey Network primetime television soap opera, The Haves and the Have Nots
- Jay Jason (1915–2001), Borscht Belt comedian
- Morgan Jay (born 1987), stand-up comedian, musician, actor and YouTuber(B)
- Jeffrey Kramer (born 1945), film and television actor and producer
- David P. Levin (born 1958), producer/writer/director for MTV, TV Land, and A&E Network
- Ilana Levine (born 1963), actress who made her first on-screen appearance as Andrea Spinelli in the HBO comedy-drama series Tanner '88
- Damon Lindelof (born 1973), co-creator and executive producer of the TV series Lost
- Leonard Maltin (born 1950), film critic and author of Leonard Maltin's Movie Guide
- Patricia McBride (born 1942), ballerina who performed with the New York City Ballet for 30 years
- Bob McGrath (1932–2022), actor who played "Bob" on TV's Sesame Street, the longest-lasting human character on the program
- Julianne Michelle (born 1984), film and television actress
- Zalmen Mlotek (born 1954), conductor, pianist, musical arranger, accompanist, composer; artistic director of the National Yiddish Theatre – Folksbiene
- Susan Morrow (1931–1985), actress, star of The Savage(B)
- Ozzie Nelson (1906–1975) and Harriet Nelson (1909–1994), from The Adventures of Ozzie and Harriet
- Ricky Nelson (1940–1985), son of Ozzie and Harriet; actor (Rio Bravo); musician elected to the Rock and Roll Hall of Fame in 1987
- Chris O'Neal (born 1994), actor who appeared on Nickelodeon's How to Rock
- Miko Oscard (born 1944), former child actor who appeared in film and television
- Sarah Jessica Parker (born 1965), actress, played Carrie Bradshaw on HBO's Sex and the City
- Charles Payne (born 1960), Fox Business Network television show host
- Danielle Pinnock (born 1988), actress, comedian and writer
- Randall Pinkston (born 1950), correspondent for CBS News
- Dana Reeve (1961–2006), actress, singer, activist for disability causes; wife of Christopher Reeve(B)
- Robert Ridgely (1931–1997), actor and voice-over artist; appeared in many Mel Brooks movies and in Boogie Nights
- David Rothenberg (born 1933), Broadway producer and prisoners' rights activist
- Rick Schwartz (born c. 1968), film producer
- Seret Scott (born 1949), actress, director, and playwright, best known for her roles in the films Losing Ground and Pretty Baby
- Matt Servitto (born 1965), actor known for his role on The Sopranos as FBI agent Dwight Harris(B)
- Lawrence Sher (born 1970), cinematographer
- Paul Sorvino (1939–2022), actor
- Josh Sussman (born 1983), actor
- Bill Timoney (born 1958), actor, director, script writer and producer(B)
- Judy Tyler (1933–1957), actress who played Princess Summerfallwinterspring on Howdy Doody and starred opposite Elvis Presley in Jailhouse Rock
- John Ventimiglia (born 1963), actor; played Artie Bucco on The Sopranos

=== Music ===
- Nat Adderley (1931–2000), jazz cornet and trumpet player
- Nat Adderley, Jr. (born 1955), music arranger who spent much of his career with Luther Vandross
- Ray Barretto (1929–2006), conga drummer and bandleader
- Eef Barzelay (born 1970), chief songwriter, singer, and guitarist of alt-country indie rock band Clem Snide
- Bernard Belle, composer, producer and musician
- Regina Belle (born 1963), Grammy Award-winning singer
- Roni Ben-Hur (born 1962), bebop jazz guitarist
- Louis Black (born 1950), co-founder of South by Southwest Music, Film, and Interactive Conference and Festival
- Miles Bonny (born 1980), record producer, singer-songwriter, trumpeter and DJ
- Pat Boone (born 1934), star pop singer from the 1950s whose best-known hits were Ain't That a Shame and Love Letters in the Sand
- Billy Butler (1924–1991), soul jazz guitarist
- Donald Byrd (1932–2013), jazz trumpeter
- Cakes da Killa (born as Rashard Bradshaw), rapper
- Brendan Canty (born 1966), drummer of indie rock band Fugazi
- Gordon Chambers (born c. 1969), singer-songwriter whose work includes "If You Love Me" by Brownstone
- Ray Chew (born c. 1968), music director
- Graham Clarke (born 1970), musician, songwriter, arranger, and entertainer
- Brenda Miller Cooper (1916–2008), operatic soprano
- Johnny Copeland (1937–1997), blues guitarist and singer
- Shemekia Copeland (born 1979), blues singer
- DMX (born as Earl Simmons, 1970–2021), rapper and actor
- Plácido Domingo (born 1941), operatic tenor
- Ray Drummond (born 1946), jazz bassist
- Randy Edelman (born 1947), film and TV score composer
- Jon Faddis (born 1953), jazz trumpeter, conductor, composer and educator
- Jon Garrison (born 1944), operatic tenor
- Jimmy Gnecco (born 1973), musician from the Ours
- Christine Goerke (born 1969), Grammy Award-winning dramatic soprano
- Wally Gold (1928–1998), singer, songwriter, producer, music industry executive, best known for co-writing "It's Now or Never", "Good Luck Charm" and "It's My Party"
- Lesley Gore (1946–2015), singer, songwriter, actress and activist known for her pop hit "It's My Party"
- Florence Greenberg (1913–1995), record producer who discovered The Shirelles
- Ferde Grofé (1892–1972), composer and arranger, best known for his Grand Canyon Suite
- Roland Hanna (1932–2002), jazz pianist, composer and teacher
- Joe Harnell (1924–2005), composer and arranger
- Al Hibbler (1915–2001), R&B singer; later civil rights activist
- Ronald Isley (born 1941), co-founder and lead singer of the Isley Brothers
- Rudolph Isley (1939–2023), founding member of the Isley Brothers
- Milt Jackson (1923–1999), jazz vibraphonist
- Moe Jaffe (1901–1972), songwriter
- Jodeci, R&B group of the early 1990s
- J. J. Johnson (1924–2001), jazz trombonist
- Kevin Jonas (born 1987), background vocalist and lead guitarist for the Jonas Brothers
- Sam Jones (1924–1981), jazz double bassist, cellist and composer
- Thad Jones (1923–1986), jazz trumpeter, composer and bandleader
- Ben Jorgensen (born 1983), lead singer of Armor for Sleep
- Don "Magic" Juan (born 1950), merengue and hip-hop artist, from the 1990s merengue group Proyecto Uno
- Ulysses Kay (1917–1995), composer
- Ben E. King (1938–2015), singer, "Stand by Me"
- Michael Korie, librettist and lyricist, whose works include Grey Gardens
- Anthony Laciura (born 1951), character tenor for the Metropolitan Opera
- Ezra Laderman (1924–2015), contemporary classical music composer who served as Dean and Professor at the Yale School of Music
- Yusef Lateef (1920–2013), jazz multi-instrumentalist and composer
- Lil' Kim (born 1974), rapper; born Kimberly Jones
- Amy London (born 1957), jazz singer
- Mario (born 1986), R&B singer
- Master Gee (born Guy O'Brien), co-founder of the hip hop group The Sugarhill Gang, best known for "Rapper's Delight"
- Elliot Mazer (1941–2021), audio engineer and record producer best known for his work with Linda Ronstadt, Neil Young, Bob Dylan, The Band and Janis Joplin
- Rose Marie McCoy (1922–2015), songwriter
- Clyde McPhatter (1932–1972), R&B singer who founded The Drifters
- Allan Monk (born 1942), baritone opera singer
- Melissa Morgan (born 1980), jazz vocalist
- The Notorious B.I.G. (1972–1997), rapper; born Christopher Wallace
- Duke Pearson (1932–1980), jazz pianist and composer
- Bernard Purdie (born 1941), prolific session drummer
- Rufus Reid (born 1944), jazz bassist and music educator
- Richie Ranno (born 1950), guitarist best known as a member of Starz
- Scott Robinson (born 1959), jazz musician best known for his work with various styles of saxophone
- Paul A. Rothchild (1935–1995), music producer of the late 1960s and 1970s, best known for his work with The Doors
- Ernie Royal (1921–1983), jazz trumpeter
- Hilton Ruiz (1952–2006), jazz pianist, Afro-Cuban style
- Juelz Santana (born 1982), rapper
- Linda Scott (born 1945), singer best known for her 1961 hit "I've Told Every Little Star"
- Alan Silvestri (born 1950), film composer
- Ray Simpson (born 1954), lead singer of the Village People since 1980
- Dave Sirulnick (born 1964), executive vice president for Multiplatform Production, News and Music at MTV
- Phoebe Snow (1952–2011), singer-songwriter born Phoebe Laub, who adopted the name of a train that ran through Teaneck, the Phoebe Snow
- DJ Spinderella (born Deidra Muriel Roper, 1971), DJ for the hip-hop group Salt-n-Pepa
- Trey Songz (born 1984), R&B singer
- Joris Teepe, jazz bassist, composer, arranger and big-band leader
- Raymond Torres-Santos (born 1958), classical composer, pianist, arranger, conductor and Professor of Music at CUNY
- McCoy Tyner (1938–2020), jazz pianist known for his work with the John Coltrane Quartet
- Lenny White (born 1949), drummer described as "one of the founding fathers of jazz fusion"
- Eliot Zigmund (born 1945), jazz drummer; has worked extensively as a session musician

== Business and industry ==
- Bob Beaumont (1932–2011), founder of Citicar, an electric automobile manufacturer from 1974 to 1977
- Matthew Hiltzik (born 1972), CEO and president of Hiltzik Strategies, a strategic consulting and communications firm
- Les Otten (born 1949), former CEO of the American Skiing Company
- John G. Ryan (1910–1989), publisher who was president of P.F. Collier and Son Corporation, which distributed the Collier's Encyclopedia
- Paul Singer (born 1944), founder of Elliott Management Corporation
- Lynn Tilton (born 1959), businesswoman
- Bill Zanker (born 1954), creator of The Learning Annex

== Government and politics ==
- Vincent M. Battle (born 1940), former United States Ambassador to Lebanon (B)
- William W. Bennett (1841–1912), property manager of the William Walter Phelps estate, who served as the first Mayor of Teaneck, New Jersey
- Leonie Brinkema (born 1944), U.S. District Court judge in the Zacarias Moussaoui case (B)
- Thomas Ryan Byrne (1923–2014), career diplomat who served as United States Ambassador to the Kingdom of Norway (B)
- Gale D. Candaras (born 1947), member of the Massachusetts Senate
- Donna Christian-Christensen (born 1945), non-voting delegate to the United States House of Representatives for the United States Virgin Islands
- Thomas Costa (1912–2003), member of the New Jersey General Assembly from 1968 to 1972 who served as mayor of Teaneck from 1966 to 1969
- John P. Cronan (born 1976), lawyer and former Assistant Attorney General in the United States Department of Justice who is a nominee to be a United States district judge of the United States District Court for the Southern District of New York (B)
- Eileen Dickinson (born 1949), politician who has served in the Vermont House of Representatives since 2009 (B)
- Naomi G. Eichen (born 1938), retired judge of the New Jersey Superior Court, Appellate Division
- Jeremy Feigenbaum, lawyer who has served as the inaugural Solicitor General of New Jersey since July 2020
- Matthew Feldman (1919–1994), mayor of Teaneck from 1960 to 1966; member of the New Jersey Senate for 1966–1968 and 1974–1994
- Steven Goldstein, LGBT activist and founder of Garden State Equality
- Nelson G. Gross (1932–1997), politician who served in the New Jersey General Assembly and as chairman of the New Jersey Republican State Committee
- Mohammed Hameeduddin (born c. 1973), mayor of Teaneck, first Muslim mayor in Bergen County
- Archibald C. Hart (1873–1935), represented New Jersey's 6th congressional district, 1912–1913 and 1913–1917
- Edward H. Hynes (born 1946), politician who served two terms in the New Jersey General Assembly (B)
- Elie Katz (born 1974), former mayor of Teaneck (B)
- Florence Breed Khan (1875–1950), political hostess
- Eleanor Kieliszek (1925–2017), first woman elected to the Teaneck Township Council (1970–2000) and first woman elected mayor of Teaneck (1974–1978, 1990–1992)
- Theodora Lacey (born 1932), educator, civil rights activist, and leader of the effort to desegregate Teaneck's public schools
- Luis Muñoz Marín (1898–1980), first democratically elected Governor of Puerto Rico
- Gabrielle Kirk McDonald (born 1942), federal and international judge
- Dennis McNerney, former County Executive of Bergen County
- Michael W. Moynihan (c. 1928–1996), advocate of free trade who worked in the United States government and for international trade organizations (B)
- Peter Pace (born 1945), former Chairman of the Joint Chiefs of Staff; first Marine to hold the position
- Arnold Petersen (1885–1976), National Secretary of the Socialist Labor Party of America from 1914 to 1969
- William Walter Phelps (1839–1894), member of the United States House of Representatives who served as Envoy Extraordinary and Minister Plenipotentiary to Germany
- Christopher Porrino (born 1967), lawyer who became Acting New Jersey Attorney General in June 2016 (B)
- Anthony Principi (born 1944), United States Secretary of Veterans Affairs 2001–2005
- Elizabeth Randall (born 1954), politician who served in the New Jersey General Assembly from 1986 to 1992, representing the 39th Legislative District(B)
- Adam Szubin, politician who has served as the Acting Secretary of the Treasury of the United States
- Carmen E. Turner (1931–1992), first African-American woman to head a major public transit agency, the Washington Metropolitan Area Transit Authority
- Paul A. Volcker, Jr. (1927–2019), Chairman of the Federal Reserve during 1979–1987, and son of Paul A. Volcker, Sr., Teaneck's first Municipal Manager
- Loretta Weinberg (born 1935), former Majority Leader of the New Jersey Senate
- Craig Zucker (born 1975), member of the Maryland Senate

== Religious leaders ==
- Howard Jachter, rabbi who is a specialist in Jewish divorce procedure
- Efrem Goldberg, Orthodox rabbi, writer, lecturer and podcaster
- Jeremy Wieder (born 1971), rosh yeshiva and instructor at Yeshiva University's Rabbi Isaac Elchanan Theological Seminary

== Sports ==
- Brooke Ammerman (born 1990), ice hockey forward who was the first player to score a goal in Metropolitan Riveters history
- Robby Anderson (born 1993), wide receiver for the New York Jets
- Larry Arico (born 1969), former American football coach
- Kim Barnes Arico (born 1970), women's basketball coach who is head coach of the Michigan Wolverines women's basketball team
- Lance Ball (born 1985), former running back for the Denver Broncos
- Beth Beglin (born 1957), three-time member of the United States women's national field hockey team at the Summer Olympics
- Dellin Betances (born 1988), pitcher who played for the New York Mets and New York Yankees
- Jim Bouton (1939–2019), former pitcher for the New York Yankees, sportscaster and author of the controversial tell-all book Ball Four
- Chris Brantley (born 1970), wide receiver who played in the NFL for the Los Angeles Rams and Buffalo Bills
- Rosey Brown (1932–2004), offensive tackle who played for the New York Giants from 1953 to 1965
- Tony Campbell (born 1962), former NBA basketball player for the New York Knicks and several other teams
- Sam Cassell (born 1969), NBA player who lived here while playing for the New Jersey Nets
- Sal Cenicola (born 1960), professional boxer recognized by the Guinness Book of World Records for the longest interval between professional boxing matches
- Rick Cerone (born 1954), former MLB catcher who played for both the New York Mets and New York Yankees
- T. J. Clemmings (born 1991), NFL offensive tackle for the Washington Redskins
- Mike DeGerick (born 1943), pitcher who played two games for the Chicago White Sox before a line drive hit his head and ended his career
- Alison Desir, author, activist and runner
- Lawrence Frank (born 1970), former head coach of the New Jersey Nets
- Mike Fraysse (born 1943), US Olympic Cycling Coach; inducted into the United States Bicycling Hall of Fame
- Zach Freemantle (born 2000), college basketball player for the Xavier Musketeers
- Doug Glanville (born 1970), baseball player who played for the Philadelphia Phillies and other teams
- Steve Goepel (born 1949), former football player and coach (B)
- Tamba Hali (born 1983), former NFL linebacker for the Kansas City Chiefs of the NFL, born in Liberia but attended high school in Teaneck
- Kevin Herget (born 1991), professional baseball pitcher for the Tampa Bay Rays
- Jayden Hibbert (born 2004) is a professional soccer player who plays as a goalkeeper for Major League Soccer club Atlanta United
- Elston Howard (1929–1980), baseball player New York Yankees
- Zab Judah (born 1977), champion welterweight boxer
- Bob Klapisch (born 1957), sportswriter for The Record
- Maya Lawrence (born 1980), fencer and part of the United States Fencing Team at the 2012 Summer Olympics in London, where she won a bronze medal in the women's team épée
- Carl "Spider" Lockhart (1943–1986), safety who played his entire 11-year career with the New York Giants
- Ryan Malleck (born 1993), American football tight end for the Houston Texans of the National Football League (B)
- James Margolis (1936–2025), fencer who represented the United States in the individual and team épée events at the 1960 Summer Olympics in Rome
- Mike Massenzio (born 1982), mixed martial artist; has competed as a Middleweight in the Ultimate Fighting Championship
- Pete McArdle (1929–1985), Irish born long-distance runner who became a U.S. citizen, taking a gold medal for the United States at the 1963 Pan American Games in São Paulo, Brazil
- Jim McGovern (born 1965), professional golfer (B)
- Christina McHale (born 1992), tennis player (B)
- Hank Morgenweck (1929–2007), Major League Baseball umpire, 1970–1975; called Nolan Ryan's fourth no-hitter
- John Orsino (1938–2016), Major League Baseball catcher who played for the San Francisco Giants (1961–1962), Baltimore Orioles (1963–1965) and Washington Senators (1966–1967) (B)
- Randi Patterson (born 1985), professional soccer player who played for the New York Red Bulls
- Bob Peck (1928–2021), athletic administrator who served as athletic director at Boston University and Williams College
- Kasib Powell (born 1981), NBA basketball player who has played for the Miami Heat
- Jean Prioleau (born 1970), head coach of the San Jose State Spartans men's basketball team
- Seth Roland (born 1957), former soccer player who has been coach of the Fairleigh Dickinson Knights men's soccer team
- Giuseppe Rossi (born 1987), Italian-American association football player, currently playing for Genoa C.F.C. and Italy national football team
- Nick Saviano (born 1956), former tennis player; won one ATP title and reached two other finals
- Jason Sehorn (born 1971), former NFL football player who played cornerback for the New York Giants (1994–2002) and St. Louis Rams (2003)
- Steve Siegel (born 1948), former professional tennis player who played briefly on the international tennis circuit in the 1970s
- John Sterling (born 1948), sportscaster for the New York Yankees
- David Stern (1942–2020), former commissioner of the National Basketball Association
- Tyler Tejada (born 2005), college basketball player for the Townson Tigers
- Kamali Thompson (born 1991), fencer and physician
- Nadame Tucker (born 2000), college football defensive end who played for the Houston Cougars and Western Michigan Broncos
- Quentin Walker (born 1961, class of 1979), former running back who played in the NFL for the St. Louis Rams
- Doug Wark (born 1951), former soccer forward who spent five seasons in the North American Soccer League and three in the Major Indoor Soccer League
- David West (born 1980), NBA basketball player with the New Orleans/Oklahoma City Hornets
- Brandon Wimbush (born 1996), quarterback who played for the Notre Dame Fighting Irish football team (B)
- Dave Winfield (born 1951), Hall of Fame baseball player
- Ahmed Zayat (born 1962), thoroughbred racehorse owner whose horse American Pharoah won the Triple Crown in 2015

== Other ==
- Mickey Featherstone (born 1949), mobster and leader of The Westies gang
- Martin Fleisher (born 1958), bridge player and attorney; won bridge world championship in 2017
- Shabbos Kestenbaum (born 1998), antisemitism activist(B)
- Frank Lucas (1930–2019), drug lord in Harlem in the 1970s, and the subject of the 2007 biopic American Gangster
- Marty Ravellette (1938–2007), armless hero
- David Sklansky (1947–2026), professional poker player and author
