= Teaneck High School =

High school in Bergen County, New Jersey, US

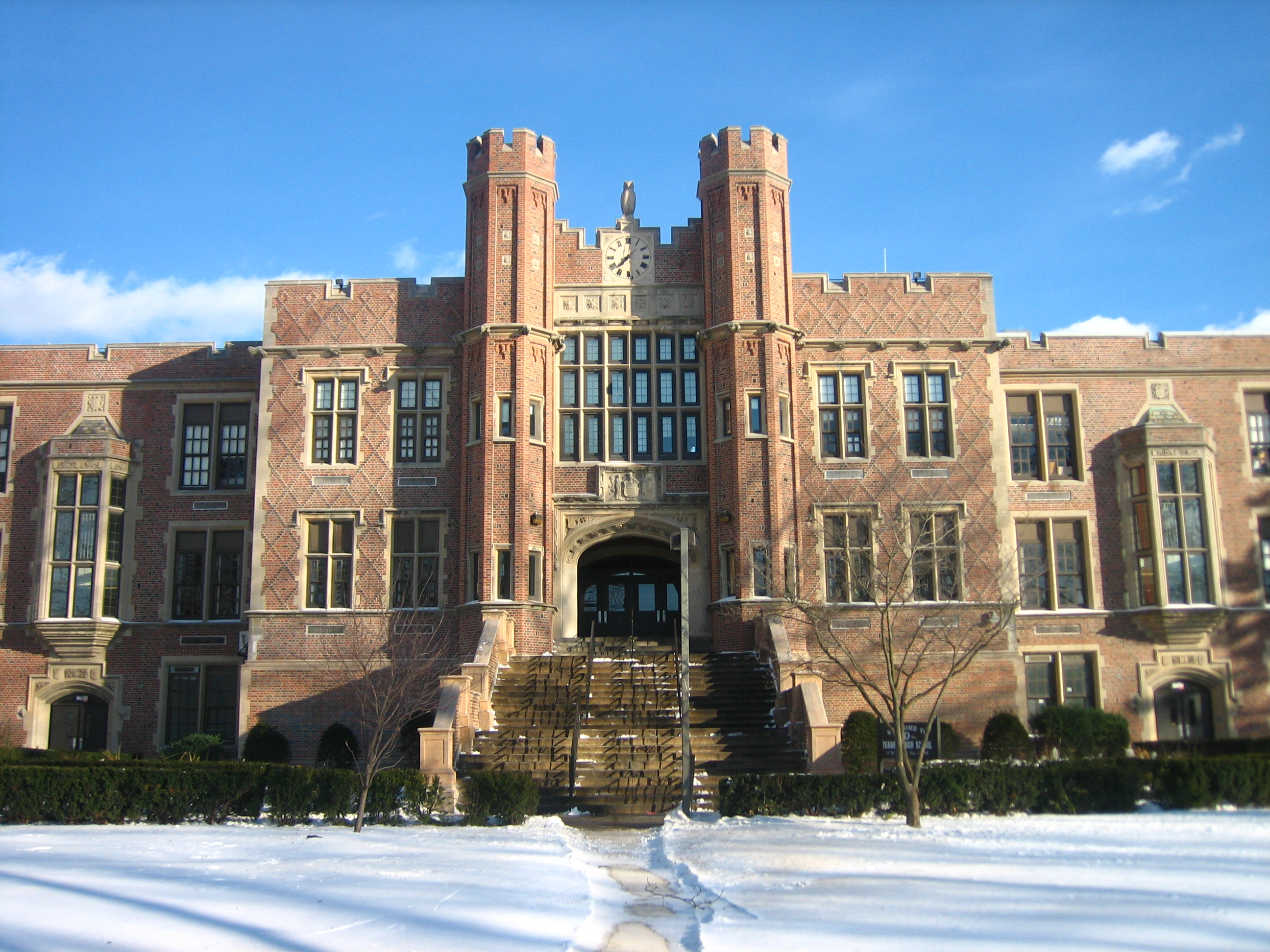
- Teaneck High School in April 2007

Location
- 100 Elizabeth Street; Teaneck, Bergen County, New Jersey 07666; United States; 40°53′28″N 74°0′28″W

Information
- School type: Public, high school
- Motto: Latin: Mentem Colere Et Personam Meliorare (To enrich the mind and improve the character)
- Established: 1922; 104 years ago
- School district: Teaneck Public Schools
- NCES School ID: 341608000840
- Principal: Piero LoGiudice
- Faculty: 103.7 FTEs
- Grades: 9–12
- Enrollment: 1,244 (as of 2024–25)
- Student to teacher ratio: 12.0:1
- Hours in school day: 6 hours
- Colors: Royal blue White
- Athletics: Baseball • basketball • cheerleading • crew • cross country • fencing • football • indoor track • soccer • softball • tennis • track • volleyball • wrestling
- Athletics conference: Big North Conference (general); North Jersey Super Football Conference (football)
- Team name: Highwaymen / Highwaywomen
- Rival: Hackensack High School
- Accreditation: Middle States Association of Colleges and Schools
- Yearbook: Hi-Way
- Magazine: The Looking Glass
- Website: www.teaneckschools.org/teaneckhighschool_home.aspx

Teaneck High School (known as The Castle on the Hill) is a four-year comprehensive public high school in Teaneck, in Bergen County, New Jersey, United States, serving students in ninth through twelfth grades as the lone secondary school of the Teaneck Public Schools. The school has been accredited by the Middle States Association of Colleges and Schools Commission on Elementary and Secondary Schools since 1935.

As of the 2024–25 school year, the school had an enrollment of 1,244 students and 103.7 classroom teachers (on an FTE basis), for a student–teacher ratio of 12.0:1. There were 416 students (33.4% of enrollment) eligible for free lunch and 108 (8.7% of students) eligible for reduced-cost lunch.

The school was renovated in 2003–04, giving students new classrooms as well as a new student center. Teaneck created two academies that focus on the sciences and the arts.

Teaneck's sports teams are nicknamed the Highwaymen; girls' teams are called the Highwaywomen. The team name comes from the highwaymen who would seize money and belongings from those traveling along highways during the 17th and 18th century and for the school's location overlooking Route 4.

== History ==
The school was opened in the current building, which resembles a Tudor palace, in 1928, and a new wing was added in 1936. Honors courses were introduced in the 1960s. Teaneck has been a four-year high school since the 1980s.

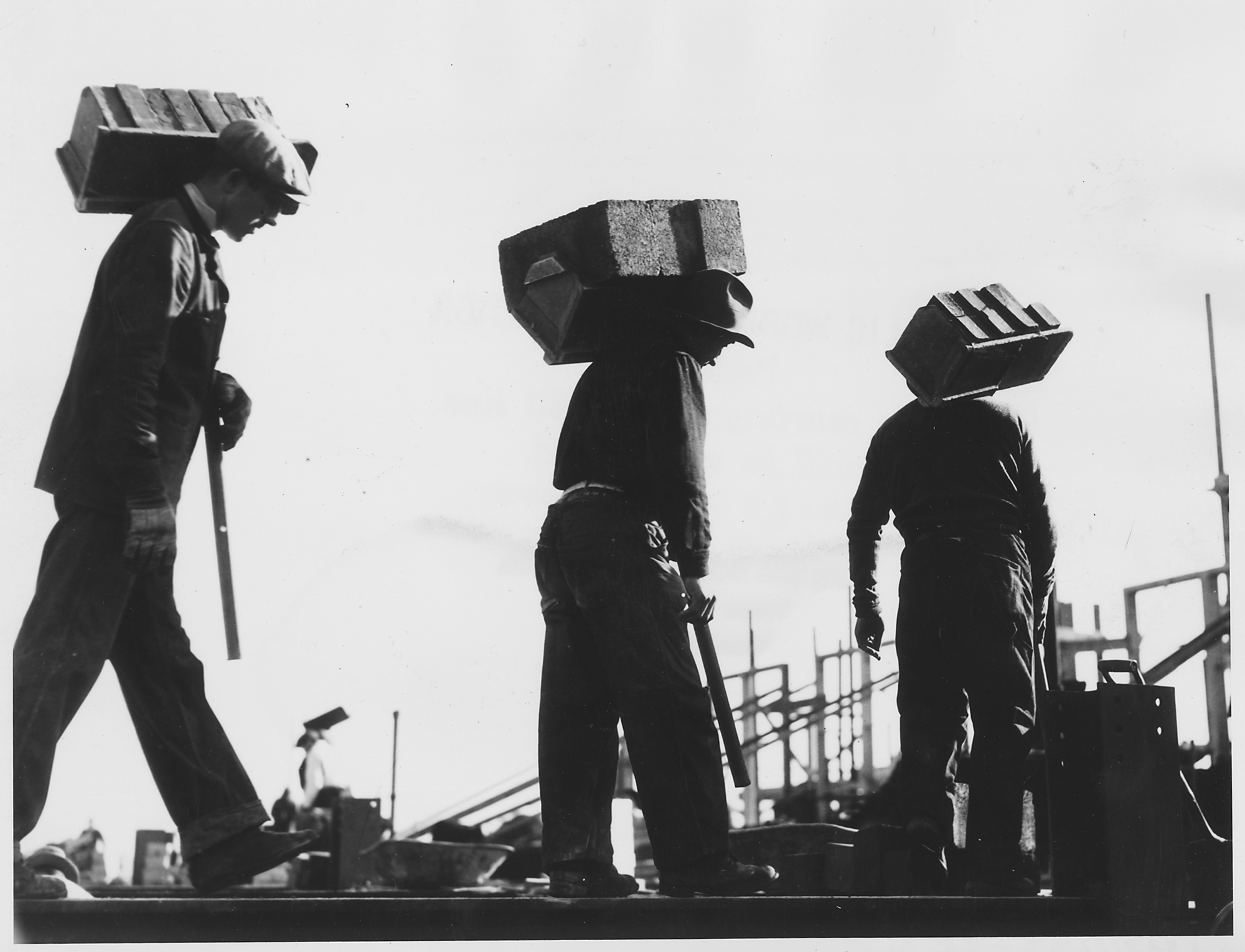
PWA hod carriers move bricks for construction of Teaneck High School

In 1934, Teaneck High School became the first in the nation to offer a program in aviation as a vocational component of its academic program. Using a plane purchased for $1,800, students were trained in class regarding the technical aspects of flying during the first year of the two-year program, with students getting at least the minimum 50 hours of flight training during the second year needed to obtain a pilot's license.

In May 1964, Teaneck's schools were officially desegregated, after the district's board of education voted to implement a centralized sixth grade school that would serve the entire township.

In 1972, the American Civil Liberties Union of New Jersey represented Teaneck High School student Abbe Seldin in her legal battle to play tennis at the school. The coach would not let her play for the men's team, although no women's team existed. Seldin won her case and later became the first woman at Syracuse University to win an athletic scholarship.

In 1987, the school was the subject of a 20/20 documentary on the effects of Heavy Metal on students.

On May 1, 2014, more than 60 students were taken into police custody following a senior prank at Teaneck High School. A police officer described the overturned tables and vaseline-smeared doorknobs as "the craziest thing [he'd] ever seen" in his 19-year career. Initial reports claimed that students had also urinated in the halls, which was refuted by the district's superintendent.

== Awards, recognition and rankings ==
In Newsweek's May 22, 2007, issue, ranking the country's top high schools, Teaneck High School was listed in 1080th place, the 33rd-highest ranked school in New Jersey.

The school was the 156th-ranked public high school in New Jersey out of 339 schools statewide in New Jersey Monthly magazine's September 2014 cover story on the state's "Top Public High Schools", using a new ranking methodology. The school had been ranked 126th in the state of 328 schools in 2012, after being ranked 114th in 2010 out of 322 schools listed. The magazine ranked the school 121st in 2008 out of 316 schools. The school was ranked 102nd in the magazine's September 2006 issue, which surveyed 316 schools across the state.

Schooldigger.com ranked the school 266th out of 367 public high schools statewide in its 2009–10 rankings which were based on the combined percentage of students classified as proficient or above proficient on the language arts literacy and mathematics components of the High School Proficiency Assessment (HSPA).

== Academies ==
In the fall of 2002, two academies, or "schools within a school," were launched. The T.E.A.M.S. Academy (Technology-Enriched Academy for Mathematics and Science) is a three-hour daily program that seeks to integrate technology, mathematics, science, and computer science in a smaller learning environment. The TAA Performing Arts Academy aims to integrate various art forms such as dance, film making, instrumental music and technical theatre to prepare students for college majors and internships in the Fine and Performing Arts.

== Extracurricular activities ==
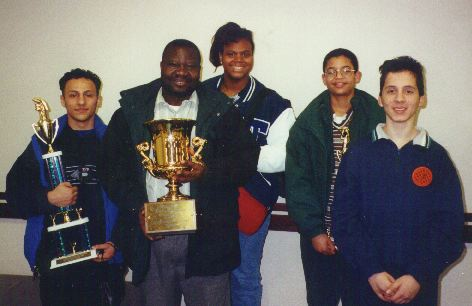
1997 New Jersey State High School Chess Champions

Shearwood "Woody" McClelland, III (Class of 1996) won the National 11th and 12th Grade Chess Championship in 1994 and 1995, the first repeat champion in tournament history. Teaneck High School won the New Jersey State High School Chess Championship in 1997, captained by Woody's sister, Kimberly (Class of 1998).

== Athletics ==
Teaneck High School Highwaymen / Highwaywomen compete in the Big North Conference, which is comprised of public and private high schools in Bergen and Passaic counties, and was established following a reorganization of sports leagues in Northern New Jersey by the New Jersey State Interscholastic Athletic Association (NJSIAA). In the 2009–10 school year, the school competed in the North Jersey Tri-County Conference, which was established on an interim basis to facilitate the realignment. Until the NJSIAA's 2009 realignment, the school had participated in Division A of the Northern New Jersey Interscholastic League, which included high schools located in Bergen, Essex and Passaic counties, and was separated into three divisions based on NJSIAA size classification. With 876 students in grades 10–12, the school was classified by the NJSIAA for the 2019–20 school year as Group III for most athletic competition purposes, which included schools with an enrollment of 761 to 1,058 students in that grade range. The football team competes in the Liberty Blue division of the North Jersey Super Football Conference, which includes 112 schools competing in 20 divisions, making it the nation's biggest football-only high school sports league. The school was classified by the NJSIAA as Group IV North for football for 2024–2026, which included schools with 893 to 1,315 students.

Sports offered include:

Fall
boys and girls cross country, football, boys and girls soccer, girls volleyball and girls tennis
Winter
boys and girls basketball, boys and girls swimming, indoor track, scholastic wrestling, boys and girls bowling, and boys and girls fencing
Spring
baseball, softball, tennis, boys track, girls track, golf, boys volleyball, boys and girls crew

Teaneck won the Group IV cross country state championship in 1961. The school's Dave Hunt was the individual champion in Group IV in 1964.

The boys soccer team won the Group IV state championship in 1965 with a 1–0 victory against runner-up Steinert High School in the tournament final.

The boys tennis team won the Group IV state championship in 1967, defeating Wayne Valley High School 2–1 in the final match of the playoffs.

The boys' basketball team won the Group III state championship in 1999 (vs. Rancocas Valley Regional High School), 2003 (vs. Trenton Central High School), 2016 (vs. Winslow Township High School) and 2017 (vs. Ewing High School). The team won the Group IV state championship in 1999 and advanced to the Tournament of Champions final, losing 54–45 to Seton Hall Preparatory School. The team won the 2003 Group IV state championship with a 61–54 win over Elizabeth High School in the semis and a 68–56 win against Trenton Central in the finals. Winning their 28th consecutive game that season, the Highwaymen took the 2011 North I Group III state sectional title with a 68–40 win over Passaic Valley Regional High School during their first year under head coach Jerome Smart. That same season, head coach Shenee Clark led the Highwaywomen to a state sectional title in the North I Group III region with a 63–42 win over Ramapo High School.

The THS homecoming football game has been held annually on Thanksgiving Day against rival Hackensack High School since 1931, alternating each year with each school as host. Hackensack has won 62 of the 85 games through the 2017 season. NJ.com listed the rivalry as 27th best in their 2017 list "Ranking the 31 fiercest rivalries in N.J. HS football". The 2026 Thanksgiving Day game between the two teams will be one of two played in North Jersey (the other being Dumont vs. Tenafly), marking the decline of what had been a more widespread tradition.

Runner Kahlia Taylor won the Group III state championships in 2012 in both the 100m and 200m sprints, becoming only the sixth female runner from a public school in North Jersey to achieve this accomplishment.

In 2020, the girls' bowling team won the Group II state championship, the first state title in program history.

== Administration ==
The school's principal is Piero LoGiudice. His core administration team includes two assistant principals and the athletic director.

== Notable alumni ==
- Lance Ball (born 1985, class of 2003), running back for the Denver Broncos
- Cathy Bao Bean (born 1942, class of 1960), author
- Roger Birnbaum (born 1950, class of 1968), film producer
- Louis Black (class of 1968), co-founder of The Austin Chronicle and the South by Southwest (SXSW) festival
- Don Bolles (1928–1976, class of 1946), investigative reporter killed in a Mob-related car bombing; the THS class of 1946 dedicated a journalism scholarship in his name
- Richard Nelson Bolles (1927–2017, class of 1945), author of What Color is Your Parachute?
- Miles Bonny (born 1980), record producer, singer-songwriter, trumpeter and DJ
- Chris Brancato (born 1962, class of 1980), producer and writer of shows including Beverly Hills, 90210, The X-Files and North Shore. Writer of the films Hoodlum and Species II
- Chris Brantley (born 1970, class of 1989), former NFL player with the Rams and Bills
- Tony Campbell (born 1962, class of 1980), former professional basketball player
- Gale D. Candaras (born 1949, class of 1967), member of the Massachusetts Senate
- Gordon Chambers (born c. 1969, class of 1986), singer-songwriter whose work includes "If You Love Me" by Brownstone
- Gaius Charles (born 1983, class of 2001), actor, Friday Night Lights

[Charles Cooper] (born 1950, class of 1968) recently retired environmental consultant, cited in 1974 by the (Bergen) Record as "the boy wonder of the conservation movement ", served as lobbyist for the NJ League for Conservation Legislation followed by more than 50 years as an environmental and fisheries consultant all over the US and in thirteen countries.

- Shemekia Copeland (born 1979, class of 1997), blues singer
- Thomas Costa (1912–2003, class of 1931), member of the New Jersey General Assembly from 1968 to 1972 who served as mayor of Teaneck from 1966 to 1969
- Mike DeGerick (born 1943, class of 1961), pitcher who played two games for the Chicago White Sox before a line drive hit his head and ended his career
- John H. Beyer (1933–2026), architect, who was a founding partner of Beyer Blinder Belle
- Randy Edelman (born 1947, class of 1965), composer of film and television scores
- Sheldon Epps (born 1952), director and producer of television and theatrical works
- Dan E. Fesman (class of 1980), television writer and producer of Wonderfalls and LAX
- Marty Fleisher (born 1958, class of 1976), champion bridge player, winner of the Intercollegiate Bridge Championship (1977), the Cavendish Invitational Pairs (2000), five major American Contract Bridge League North American Bridge Championship titles, and represented the US in the 2011, 2013, 2017 and 2019 World Championships including winning a gold medal in 2017
- Lawrence Frank (born 1970, class of 1989), basketball coach who was head coach of the New Jersey Nets
- Doug Glanville (born 1970, class of 1988), former outfielder who played for the Philadelphia Phillies and the Chicago Cubs
- Mark S. Gold (born 1949, class of 1967), physician, professor, author and researcher on the effects of opioids, cocaine, tobacco, and other drugs as well as food on the brain and behavior
- Naomi Goldenberg (born 1947), professor at the University of Ottawa
- Jeff Gottesfeld (born 1956. class of 1974 but graduated summer 1973), author, screenwriter Broken Bridges, and television writer for shows including The Young and the Restless and Smallville
- Nelson G. Gross (1932–1997, class of 1949), politician who served in the New Jersey General Assembly and as Chairman of the New Jersey Republican State Committee
- Daniel Grossberg (born 1978), Kentucky state legislator
- Tamba Hali (born 1983), linebacker who played in the NFL for the Kansas City Chiefs
- Mohammed Hameeduddin (born c. 1973), Mayor of Teaneck
- Taral Hicks (born 1974, class of 1994), R&B singer
- Steven Hyman (born 1952, class of 1970), neuroscientist and Provost of Harvard University
- Marc Jacobs (born 1963), fashion designer, graduated from High School of Art and Design
- Chris Jasper (born 1951), singer, composer and producer who was a member of the Isley Brothers and Isley-Jasper-Isley
- Brian A. Kates, film and television editor
- Michael Korie (born Michael Cory Indick, class of 1973), librettist and lyricist whose works include Grey Gardens
- Jeffrey Kramer (born 1945, class of 1963), film / television actor, who won an Emmy Award as a producer of Ally McBeal
- Bobby LaKind (1945–1992, class of 1963), percussionist of the Doobie Brothers
- Maya Lawrence (born 1980, class of 1998), fencer and member of the United States Fencing Team at the 2012 Summer Olympics in London, where she won a bronze medal in the women's team épée
- Dana Levenberg, politician who has represented the 95th district in the New York State Assembly since 2023
- David P. Levin (born 1958, class of 1976), producer, director, writer and editor
- Ilana Levine (born 1963), actress who made her first on-screen appearance as Andrea Spinelli in the HBO comedy-drama series Tanner '88
- Damon Lindelof (born 1973), co-creator, producer and head writer of Lost
- Leonard Maltin (born 1950, class of 1968), film critic
- Gabrielle Kirk McDonald (born 1942, class of 1959), judge who was president of the International Criminal Tribunal for the former Yugoslavia and served on the Iran–United States Claims Tribunal
- Melissa Morgan (born 1980), jazz musician
- Brian Morton (born 1955, class of 1973), novelist
- Michael Newdow (born 1953, class of 1970), physician and separation of church and state advocate who filed suit against inclusion of the words "under God" in public schools' recitals of the United States Pledge of Allegiance
- Chris O'Neal (born 1994), actor who appeared on Nickelodeon's How to Rock
- Miko Oscard (born 1944, class of 1962), former child actor who appeared in film and television
- Peter Pace (born 1945, class of 1963), former Chairman of the Joint Chiefs of Staff
- Bob Peck (1928–2021), athletic administrator who served as athletic director at Boston University and Williams College
- Verandah Porche (born 1945 as Linda Jacobs, class of 1963), poet
- Kasib Powell (born 1981), NBA basketball player who has played for the Miami Heat
- Jean Prioleau (born 1970), head coach of the San Jose State Spartans men's basketball team
- Eric Pulier (class of 1984), entrepreneur, author and philanthropist
- Jane S. Richardson (born 1941), biophysicist best known for developing the Richardson diagram, or ribbon diagram, a method of representing the 3D structure of proteins
- Paul A. Rothchild (1935–1995, class of 1954), record producer, most notably of The Doors
- David Rothenberg (born 1933, class of 1951), Broadway producer and prisoners' rights activist
- Mary Jane Russell (1926–2003), photographic fashion model
- Frederick Schauer (1946–2024), legal scholar who was known for his work on American constitutional law, freedom of speech and legal reasoning
- Linda Scott (born 1945, as Linda Joy Sampson), pop singer best known for her 1961 hit "I've Told Every Little Star" (1961)
- Paul Shambroom (born 1956, class of 1974), photographer
- Lawrence Sher (born 1970, class of 1988), cinematographer who developed an interest in photography after his father convinced him to take a 35mm camera on a school-sponsored trip to France
- Steve Siegel (born 1948, class of 1966), former professional tennis player who played briefly on the international tennis circuit in the 1970s
- Alan Silvestri (born 1950, class of 1968) film composer
- Paul Singer (born 1944, class of 1962), hedge fund manager and activist investor
- Dave Sirulnick (born 1964), television producer
- David Sklansky (1947–2026, class of 1966), professional poker player
- Phoebe Snow (stage name of Phoebe Laub; 1950–2011, class of 1968), singer / songwriter, whose stage name was taken from the name of a train that ran through Teaneck, the Phoebe Snow
- David Stern (1942–2020, class of 1959), Commissioner of the National Basketball Association
- Ellen Stone (born 1917, class of 1935), French horn player
- Tyler Tejada (born 2005), college basketball player for the Townson Tigers
- Kamali Thompson (born 1991), fencer and physician
- Lynn Tilton (born 1959, class of 1977), businesswoman, who was a tennis player at Teaneck
- Nadame Tucker (born 2000), college football defensive end who played for the Houston Cougars and Western Michigan Broncos
- John Ventimiglia (born 1963, class of 1981), actor, most notably on The Sopranos
- Paul Volcker (1927–2019, class of 1945), former Federal Reserve chairman, 1979–1987
- Quentin Walker (born 1961, class of 1979), former running back who played in the NFL for the St. Louis Rams
- Doug Wark (born 1951, class of 1970), professional soccer forward who played on the United States National Soccer Team
- Robert Weissberg (born 1941), political scientist
- Bill Zanker (class of 1972), businessman who is best known for being the founder of the adult education company The Learning Annex

== Notable faculty ==
- Herbert Cohen (born 1940), Olympic fencer, coaches the fencing team.

== Controversy ==
In 2002, Joseph White, former principal of Teaneck High School, was charged with fondling a 17-year-old student but was subsequently acquitted. In June 2006, he pleaded guilty to official child endangerment and was sentenced to one year in prison.

== Sources ==
- 1995 Teaneck High School Alumni Directory, Bernard C. Harris Publishing Company, Inc., 1995 (used exclusively to confirm / identify year of graduation)
