= Lyric Theatre (New York City, 1998) =

Broadway theater in Manhattan, New York

- Ford Center for the Performing Arts; Hilton Theatre; Foxwoods Theatre
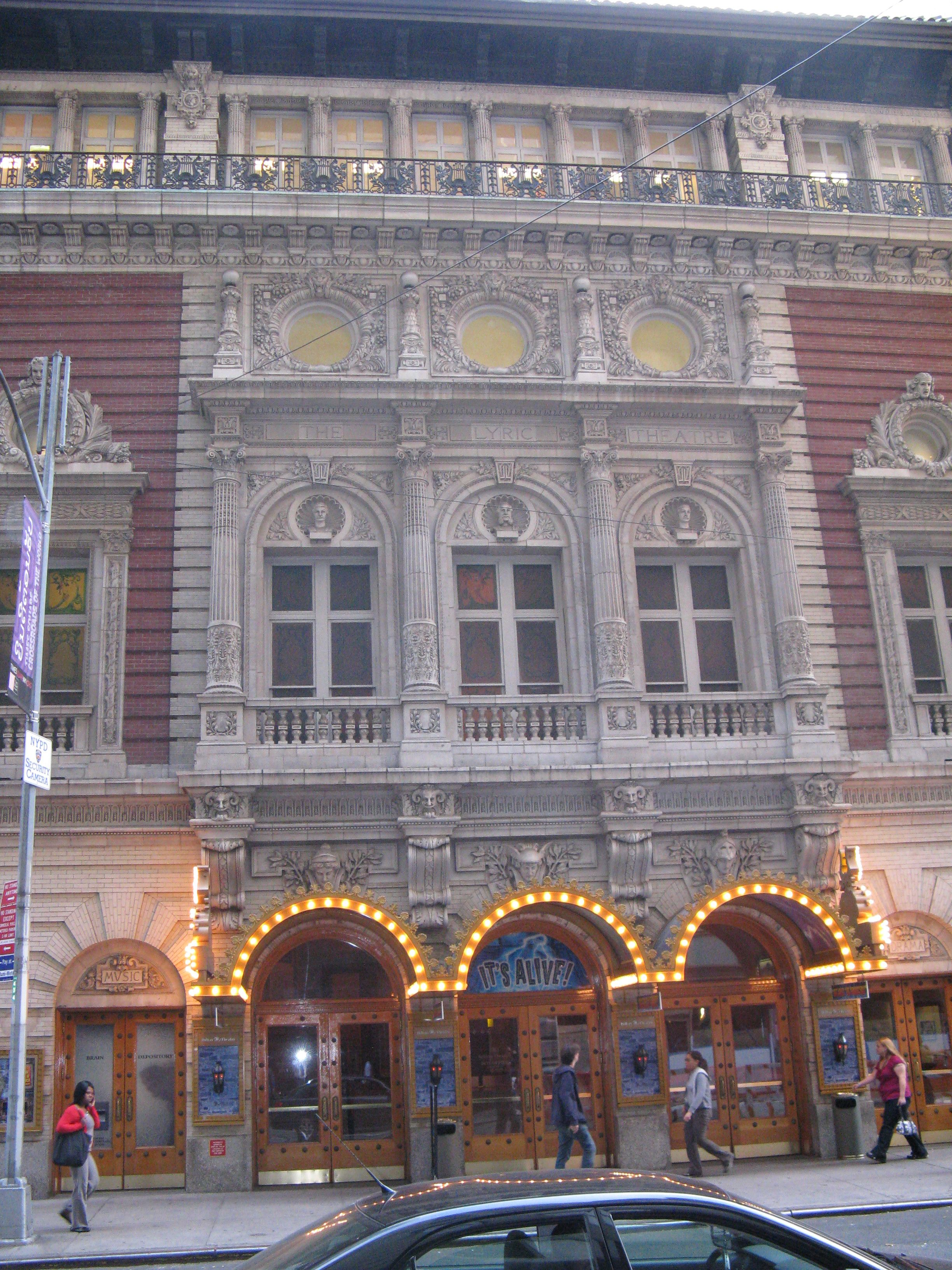
- 43rd Street entrance
- Interactive map of Lyric Theatre
- Address: 214 West 43rd Street; Manhattan, New York; United States
- Coordinates: 40°45′25″N 73°59′16″W
- Owner: City and State of New York
- Operator: ATG Entertainment
- Capacity: 1,622 (original capacity 1,821)
- Type: Broadway
- Production: Harry Potter and the Cursed Child

Construction
- Opened: January 18, 1998 (28 years ago)
- Years active: 1998–present
- Architects: Richard Blinder (Beyer Blinder Belle); Peter Kofman

Website
- us.atgtickets.com/venues/lyric-broadway/whats-on/

The Lyric Theatre (previously known as the Ford Center for the Performing Arts, the Hilton Theatre, and the Foxwoods Theatre) is a Broadway theater at 214 West 43rd Street in the Theater District of Midtown Manhattan in New York City, New York, U.S. Opened in 1998, the theater was designed by Richard Lewis Blinder of Beyer Blinder Belle, in collaboration with Peter Kofman, for Garth Drabinsky and his company Livent. The Lyric Theatre was built using parts of two former theaters on the site: the Apollo Theatre, built in 1920 to a design by Eugene De Rosa, and the old Lyric Theatre, built in 1903 to a design by Victor Hugo Koehler. The theater contains 1,622 seats across three levels and is operated by ATG Entertainment. The theater building is owned by the city and state governments of New York and was developed by New 42nd Street.

Despite having the same name as one of its predecessor theaters, the current Lyric Theatre was built almost entirely from scratch, though many parts of the old theaters were preserved to comply with government regulations. The current theater retains the original Lyric facade on 43rd Street, as well as a smaller arched facade on 42nd Street. The auditorium and stage house are placed within an entirely new structure covered with concrete and brick panels. The lobby contains a domed rotunda, with a basement lounge underneath it. The auditorium contains elements from the old Lyric's and the Apollo's interiors, including a ceiling dome, boxes, and a proscenium arch, which were modified to fit the new theater's dimensions. The large stage and the accompanying stage house were designed to accommodate major musicals.

The old Lyric and Apollo theaters had been proposed for redevelopment since the 1970s, and New 42nd Street took over the theaters in 1990. Livent leased the theaters in 1995, razing them to make way for an 1,821-seat facility named after sponsor Ford Motor Company. The Ford Center was dedicated in December 1997 and officially opened the next month. Livent filed for bankruptcy in late 1998, and the theater subsequently passed to SFX Entertainment and then Clear Channel Entertainment, which renamed it for sponsor Hilton Hotels & Resorts in 2005. The venue was renamed after Foxwoods Resort Casino in 2010 as part of a partnership with Live Nation. ATG acquired the theater in 2013 and renamed it the Lyric the following year. The Lyric's capacity was reduced in a 2017 renovation because of complaints about the theater's excessive size, which had caused several of the theater's productions to lose money.

== Site ==
The Lyric Theatre is at 214 West 43rd Street, on the southern sidewalk between Eighth Avenue and Seventh Avenue, at the southern end of Times Square in the Midtown Manhattan neighborhood of New York City, New York, U.S. The land lot has an area of 24,176 ft^{2} (2,246.0 m^{2}) and a frontage of 219 ft 4 in (66.85 m) on 43rd Street. (Note: Lampert-Greaux 1998, p. 32, gives a frontage of 215.5 ft (65.7 m).) Most of the theater is on a 100 ft-deep (30 m) site on 43rd Street, but the theater has wings extending to 42nd Street, making the total depth of the site 200 ft (61 m). The two wings on 42nd Street flank the 94-foot-wide (29 m) Times Square Theatre; the western wing is 11 feet 5 inches (3.48 m) wide, while the eastern wing is 20 feet (6.1 m) wide.

The Lyric Theatre is adjacent to the Todd Haimes Theatre to the west, the Times Square and New Victory theaters to the south, and 3 Times Square to the east. Other nearby buildings include the St. James Theatre and Hayes Theater to the northwest; 229 West 43rd Street and 1501 Broadway to the north; 1500 Broadway to the northeast; One Times Square to the east; the Times Square Tower and 5 Times Square to the southeast, and the New Amsterdam Theatre to the south.

=== Previous theaters ===
The surrounding area is part of Manhattan's Theater District and contains many Broadway theaters. In the first two decades of the 20th century, eleven venues for Legitimate theatre were built within one block of West 42nd Street between Seventh and Eighth Avenues. These venues were mostly converted to movie theaters by the 1930s, and many of them had been relegated to showing pornography by the 1970s. The current Lyric Theatre occupies the sites of the Lyric Theatre, built on the eastern half of the site in 1903, and the Apollo Theatre, built to the west in 1920. The Lyric was designed in the Beaux-Arts style, while the Apollo had decorations in the Adam style. Both theaters had entrances from 42nd Street, flanking the Times Square Theatre, although their auditoriums were on 43rd Street. When the theaters were built, 42nd Street was generally considered an upscale address.

The old Lyric was designed by Victor Hugo Koehler and constructed by the Shubert brothers for composer Reginald De Koven. It featured performers such as Fred Astaire, the Marx Brothers, and Douglas Fairbanks until it was converted to a movie theater in 1934. The exterior of the old Lyric still largely survives within the current theater. The interior decorative scheme was relatively plain. The old Lyric contained three levels of seating, topped by a ceiling dome that was surrounded by moldings of lyres and Greek masks. This theater also had 18 boxes.

The Apollo, constructed by the Selwyn brothers to a design by Eugene De Rosa, was originally a film and vaudeville theater. The Apollo was briefly a burlesque venue in the mid-1930s before turning into a movie theater in the late 1930s. The Apollo's facade on 42nd Street was built as part of the Times Square Theatre's facade. The old Apollo, decorated in a rose, tan, and blue color scheme with flat decorations, contained 1,194 seats on two levels. There were also four boxes, placed within ornate Palladian arches, as well as an Adam-style proscenium arch that measured 41 feet (12 m) wide and 25 feet (7.6 m) high. Both the Lyric and the Apollo were owned by the Brandt Theatres chain by the 1970s; the Brandts renovated both venues as part of a plan to reopen both as legitimate houses. Only the Apollo ultimately reopened, in 1979; it reverted to movies in 1983. The Apollo was then renamed the Academy Theatre and became a nightclub.

== Design ==
The current Lyric Theatre was designed by Beyer Blinder Belle (BBB) and Peter H. Kofman for Garth Drabinsky; it opened as the Ford Center in 1998. According to Richard Blinder of BBB, the current theater's design had to conform with preservation guidelines because it was part of a city-owned district controlled by New 42nd Street. As such, the theater incorporates major architectural elements and structures from both the old Lyric's facade and the Apollo's interior. The interior of the old Lyric was too badly deteriorated for most of the individual elements to be restored. Both of the old theaters' interiors were dismantled to make way for the current theater, but an office wing on 42nd Street was preserved.

=== Facade ===
The new Lyric Theatre retains the ornate facades of Koehler's original Lyric Theatre on 42nd and 43rd Street. The 43rd Street facade is divided vertically into five bays. At the center of the facade are three arched doorways topped by corbels. These are flanked by two additional doorways, which are topped by panels with the words "Music" and "Drama". On the second floor, the center of the facade contains a balustrade and three arched windows, which are flanked by banded columns. Above these windows are busts of W. S. Gilbert, Arthur Sullivan, and Reginald De Koven. There are three oculi above the arched windows, which are surrounded by floral wreaths and topped by keystones that depict lions' heads. The oculi contain heads of the ancient gods Apollo, Athena, and Hermes. Lampposts, topped by spheres, flank the oculi. On the second story, the outer bays contain rectangular windows flanked by pilasters, above which are entablatures with carved masks of comedy and tragedy. The top of the facade has a copper cornice with medallions. There is also a wrought-iron balustrade with decorations of lyres. The original theater had a sloped tile roof on 43rd Street, as well as a marquee in front of the entrance.

The old Lyric's narrow three-story facade, an arch on 42nd Street, was preserved in the new theater's construction. The first story of this arch contained a portico with a column on either side, above which was a frieze with the words "The Lyric". The second story contained the actual archway, which was decorated with terracotta. The narrowness of the 42nd Street entrance arises from the fact that, when the original theater was built, there were brownstone houses next to the theater, and land values on 42nd Street were high.

The auditorium and stage house facades, built in 1997, are to the west of the old Lyric Theatre's facade. The auditorium structure, measuring 94 ft (29 m) long and 70 ft (21 m) tall, is just west of the entrance. There is also a stage house at the far west end of the site, measuring 100 ft (30 m) tall. Originally, a sign measuring 40 ft (12 m) tall was placed atop the stage house. Both the auditorium and the stage house contain prefabricated concrete panels on their exteriors, each measuring 12 by 20 ft (3.7 by 6.1 m). The panels used on the auditorium are covered in brick, while those in front of the stage house are left exposed. These panels do not contain any windows and are mounted directly onto the theater's steel superstructure. Behind the panels are noise-reducing rubber pads.

=== Interior ===
Roger Morgan Studio was responsible for the interior design of the new Lyric Theatre. The modern theater's new design elements blend with its historical elements; the design of the lobby was inspired by the old Lyric, while the auditorium was inspired by the old Apollo. BBB initially planned to use a modern decorative scheme that contrasted with the historical design elements, but Richard Blinder said this proposal was "too diagrammatic". Lyres are used as decorative motifs throughout the interior of the new Lyric Theatre. The auditorium also includes furnishings that were constructed specifically for the new theater but were inspired by early-20th-century theaters' decorations. Drabinsky involved himself in many aspects of the new Lyric's design when it was built.

==== Lobby and adjoining areas ====
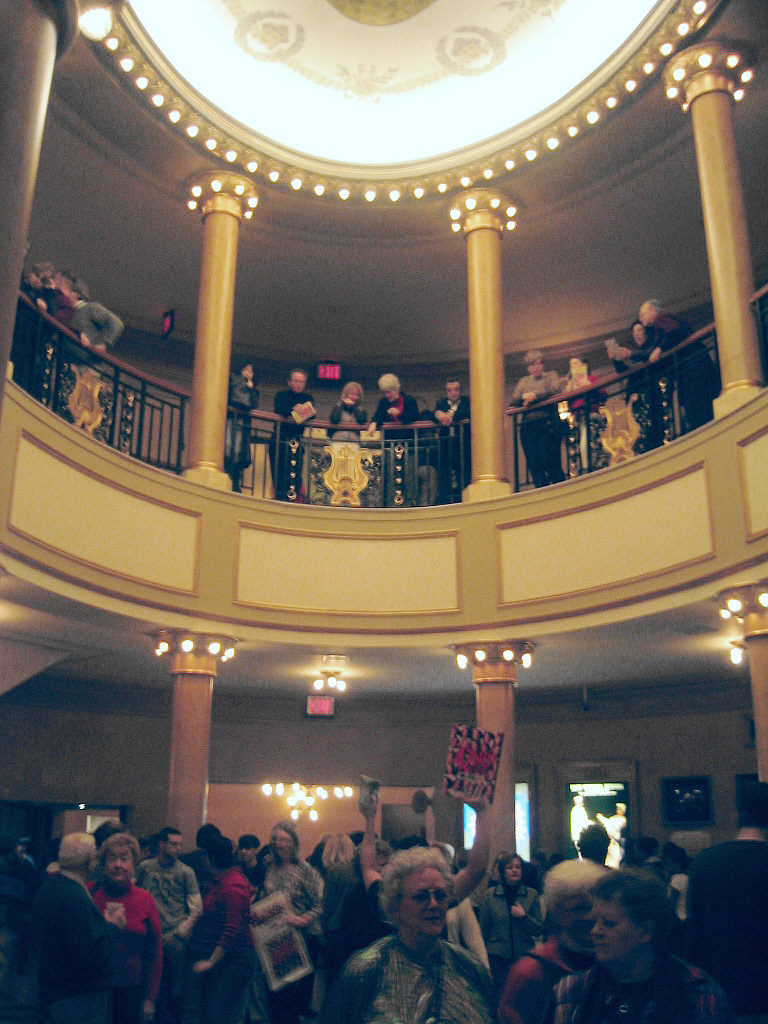
View of the lobby

The lobby of the new Lyric Theatre is on the east side of the theater, extending from 42nd to 43rd Street, with an elliptical rotunda on 43rd Street. The floor, dome, columns, and staircases of the rotunda were brand-new elements constructed for the Ford Center. The Italian-marble staircase rises from one side of the rotunda and splits into two flights, wrapping around to the mezzanine. At the top of the stair is a medallion of the Greek god Zeus. The rotunda's walls are covered with canvas panels, designed to imitate the look of cut stone. Mariuca Brancoveanu designed the rotunda's mosaic floor, which contains depictions of the masks on the original Lyric's facade, surrounded by a mosaic border. The mosaic decoration is composed of 172,800 marble pieces covering 650 ft^{2} (60 m^{2}). The capitals of the rotunda's columns are decorated with gilded guilloche reliefs that depict light bulbs. The dome of the rotunda was taken from the Apollo Theatre and measures 39 by 28 ft (11.9 by 8.5 m). The mezzanine level, overlooking the lobby, contains wrought-iron railings with depictions of lyres.

The lobby and auditorium are separated by vestibules with doors at each end, with 2 in-thick (5.1 cm) fabric panels. This was intended to minimize disruption from guests who left early or arrived late. In venues where the lobbies and auditoriums are directly connected, light and noise from the lobby could disrupt ongoing performances. The old Lyric's lobby connected both of the entrances, on 42nd and 43rd Streets. The old Apollo's lobby from 42nd Street was divided into two sections: an outer portion with rose-and-red marble walls and an Adam style plaster ceiling, and an inner portion with black-and-white marble walls. Both of the former theaters' lobbies to 42nd Street were retained when the Ford Center was built. While the Apollo's lobby to the west kept its bas-relief sculptures and black-and-white marble decorations, the old Lyric's lobby to the east had lost all of its decoration.

Under the lobby is a lounge intended for premium-ticket holders. The lounge, covering 850 ft^{2} (79 m^{2}), was originally monitored by three attendants and could be used before a performance and during intermission. The lounge also contained coat and parcel checks, dedicated restrooms and telephones, and a snack area. When the theater opened in 1998, architectural critic Herbert Muschamp wrote of the lounge: "Bad paintings hang on walls covered with tasteful vanilla moire". Above the lobby is a 1,200 ft^{2} (110 m^{2}) space for choreography and a 3,000 ft^{2} (280 m^{2}) space for rehearsals. There are also three box offices.

==== Auditorium ====
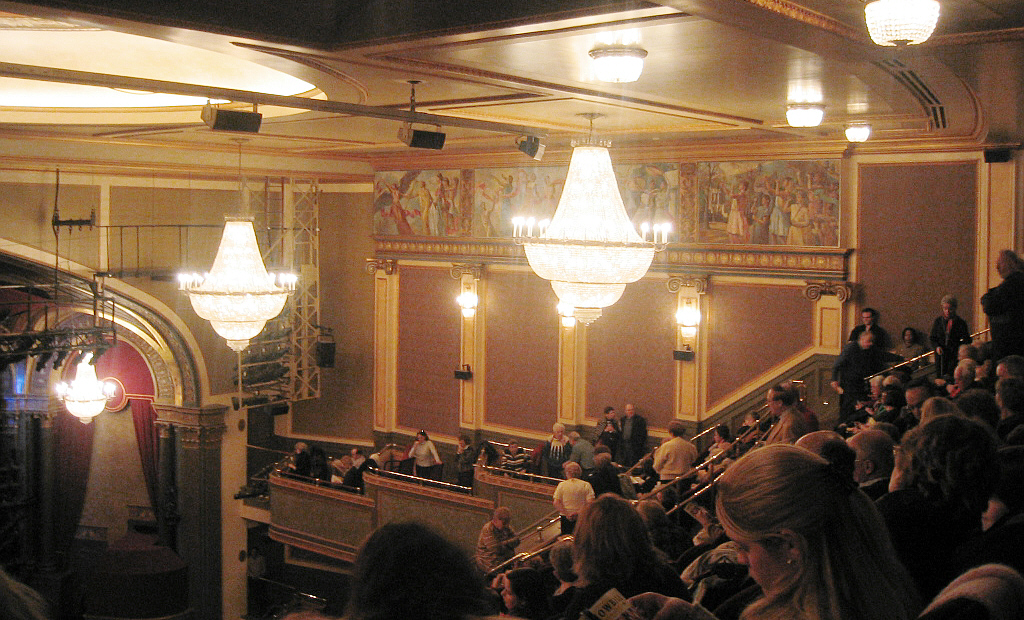
Auditorium

The new Lyric Theatre contains an orchestra level and two balconies; the lower balcony is labeled the dress circle. The orchestra level is slightly raked and is composed of concrete over a corrugated metal deck. Both of the balconies are eight rows deep and are slightly raked. The Lyric's seats are larger and deeper than in typical Broadway theaters; each seat is up to 22 in (560 mm) wide and the rows are spaced 34.5 in (880 mm) apart. The rear wall is 94 ft (29 m) from the proscenium at the front of the auditorium. The side walls are slightly curved to disperse the sound throughout the auditorium, and the rear wall is built as a concave curve for a similar reason. Two box seats on either side are taken from the original Apollo Theatre.

Generally, the color scheme is in gold and red. The ends of each row of seating are decorated in a gold color, while the seats themselves contain crimson-velour upholstery. Axminster designed lattice-patterned carpets for the auditorium's aisles. Damask wall coverings on the side walls were originally colored blue-and-green. The upper sections of the walls are decorated with 50 ft-wide (15 m) murals painted by EverGreene Architectural Arts. EverGreene also painted multicolored, glazed Adam-style decorations onto the plaster. The ceiling contains the Apollo Theatre's original dome, which is surrounded by a newer plaster ring to make it appear larger. The ceiling contains six chandeliers, four over the orchestra and two over the boxes; their design is inspired by the old Apollo's chandeliers. Above the second balcony are three smaller domes, salvaged from the old Apollo Theatre and painted in gold leaf.

The new Lyric's interior retains the proscenium arch from the Apollo, which was expanded significantly when the new theater was built. The proscenium opening in the new theater is 50 ft (15 m) wide, compared to 30 ft (9.1 m) in the old Apollo. The new theater's proscenium measures around 31 ft (9 m) high. To accommodate this, the top of the proscenium arch was widened by about 8 ft (2.4 m), while its sides were lengthened by 4 to 5 ft (1.2 to 1.5 m). (Note: Lampert-Greaux 1998, p. 33 says the arch's height was increased by 4 feet, while Amelar 1998, p. 148 and Dunlap 1997, p. 8 give a figure of 5 feet.) New steel armatures were built for the lengthened proscenium, as well as for damaged sections of plasterwork throughout the theater; plaster was then poured over the armatures. Thirty-six holes were drilled into the ceiling so trusses could be hung for productions. The rigging system consists of 90 line sets perpendicular to the proscenium.

The stage is designed to accommodate large musicals, measuring about 55 ft (17 m) deep and about 100 ft (30 m) wide. (Note: The stage is variously cited as measuring exactly 55 by 100 ft (17 by 30 m); 55 by 97 ft (17 by 30 m); or 57.5 by 98 ft (17.5 by 29.9 m).) When the theater was built, Drabinsky specified that the fly loft had to be 100 ft (30 m) high, and the stage house was to contain dressing rooms for 75 performers. To maximize space within the stage house, its support columns are embedded into the western wall, adjoining the Selwyn (American Airlines) Theatre. Such columns are typically freestanding, but this design added 8 in (200 mm) of depth to the stage house. The dressing rooms, as well as various backstage areas, are placed in the basement to free up space for the stage.

== History ==
=== Planning ===
==== Preservation attempts ====
The City at 42nd Street plan was announced in December 1979 as part of a proposal to restore West 42nd Street around Times Square. Under the plan, the old Apollo Theatre would continue to be used as a legitimate theater, operated by Brandt Theatres. The Lyric Theatre's facade would be restored, but the interior would be modified. Mayor Ed Koch wavered in his support of the plan, criticizing it as a "Disneyland on 42nd Street". Subsequently, Hugh Hardy conducted a report on 42nd Street's theaters in 1980. His report, in conjunction with a movement opposing the demolition of the nearby Helen Hayes and Morosco theaters, motivated the New York City Landmarks Preservation Commission (LPC) to survey fifty of Midtown Manhattan's extant theaters in the early 1980s.

The LPC started to consider protecting theaters, including the Apollo and Lyric theaters, as landmarks in 1982, with discussions continuing over the next several years. While the LPC granted landmark status to many Broadway theaters starting in 1987, it deferred decisions on the exterior and interior of the Lyric Theatre, as well as the interior of the Apollo Theatre. Further discussion of the landmark designations was delayed for several decades. In late 2015, the LPC hosted public hearings on whether to designate the Apollo, the Lyric, and five other theaters as landmarks. The LPC rejected the designations in February 2016 because the theaters were already subject to historic-preservation regulations set by the state government.

==== Redevelopment proposals ====
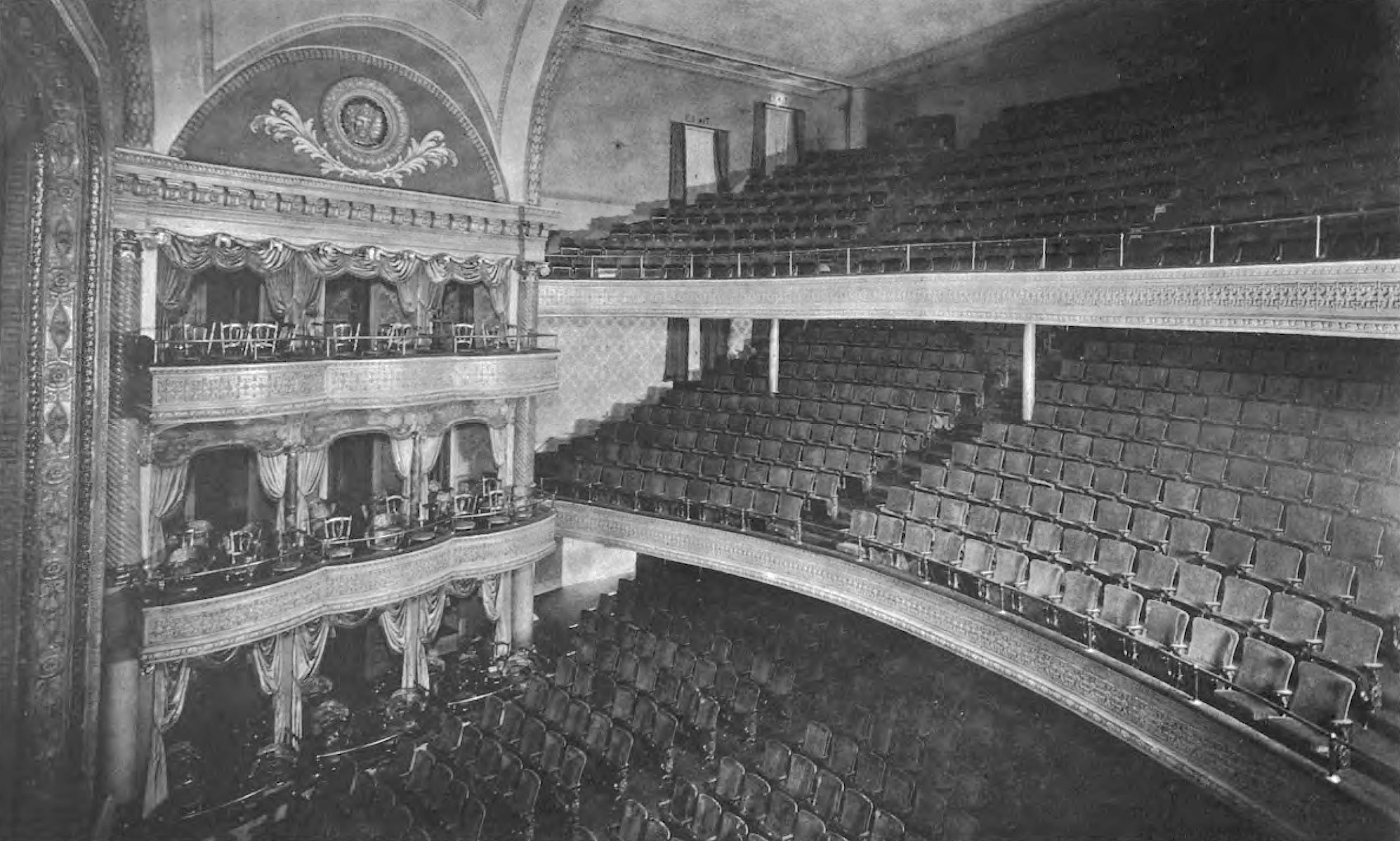
Interior of the old Lyric Theatre

The Urban Development Corporation (UDC), an agency of the New York state government, then proposed redeveloping the area around a portion of West 42nd Street in 1981. The plan centered around four towers that were to be built at 42nd Street's intersections with Broadway and Seventh Avenue, developed by Park Tower Realty and the Prudential Insurance Company of America. (Note: The sites were: Northwest corner of 42nd Street and Seventh Avenue: now 3 Times Square; Northeast corner of 42nd Street and Broadway: now 4 Times Square; Southwest corner of 42nd Street and Seventh Avenue: now 5 Times Square; South side of 42nd Street between Seventh Avenue and Broadway: now 7 Times Square (Times Square Tower)) It was delayed for several years due to lawsuits and disputes concerning the towers.

From 1987 to 1989, Park Tower and Prudential hired Robert A. M. Stern to conduct a study on the Apollo, Lyric, Selwyn (later American Airlines), Times Square, and Victory theaters on the north side of 42nd Street. Stern devised three alternatives for the five theaters. City and state officials announced plans for the five theaters, along with the Liberty Theatre on the south side of 42nd Street, in September 1988. Stern presented a model of his plan the next month. The plan called for restoring the Apollo Theatre as a legitimate venue and converting the Lyric Theatre's heavily modified interior to a 2,500-seat auditorium. The UDC opened a request for proposals for six of the theaters that October. The Liberty and Victory were to be converted into performing-arts venues for nonprofit organizations, while the Selwyn, Apollo, Lyric, and Times Square were to be converted to commercial use. By the end of the year, the plans were threatened by a lack of money.

In early 1989, several dozen nonprofit theater companies submitted plans to the UDC for the takeover of six theaters. Most of the bids were for the Liberty and Victory, but the Selwyn, Apollo, Lyric, and Times Square theaters received 13 bids between them. That year, The Durst Organization acquired the leases to eight theaters in Times Square, including the Apollo and Lyric. It subsequently announced plans to renovate the eight theaters in February 1990. The New York state government acquired the theater sites that April via eminent domain. The city had planned to buy out the theaters' leases but withdrew after the 42nd Street Company indicated it would lease the theaters to another developer. Although Durst protested the move, a New York Supreme Court judge ruled that the sites could be acquired by condemnation. A nonprofit organization, New 42nd Street, was formed in September 1990 to restore six of the theaters and find uses for them. Government officials hoped that development of the theaters would finally allow the construction of the four towers around 42nd Street, Broadway, and Seventh Avenue. In 1992, New 42nd Street received a $18.2 million grant for restoring the six theaters. By the next year, there were proposals to open an information center in either the Apollo or the Lyric. After Disney committed to restoring the New Amsterdam Theatre in 1994, most of the other theaters around 42nd Street were quickly leased.

=== Lease and construction ===
Garth Drabinsky, president of Canadian company Livent, toured the Apollo and Lyric in January 1994. At the time, he was looking for a new Broadway theater for his company. That September, MTV took an option on the Apollo, Lyric, and Times Square theaters, which it planned to convert into a production studio. However, the negotiations with MTV fell through. Livent signed a long-term lease for the Apollo and Lyric theaters in July 1995. Livent planned to combine the theaters into a single 1,850-seat house for large musicals, using architectural elements of both theaters. The proposed large theater, a continuation of Stern's late-1980s plan for the site, would be the second-largest Broadway venue behind the Gershwin Theatre. The combined sites provided a large amount of space, with entrances from both 42nd and 43rd Streets. Ron Delsener, who was leasing the Apollo for rock concerts, objected that Livent could "kick us out when they feel like it" after New 42nd Street refused to renew his lease. Meanwhile, the original Lyric Theatre's marquee on 42nd Street was removed in 1995 during the reconstruction of the New Victory Theater.

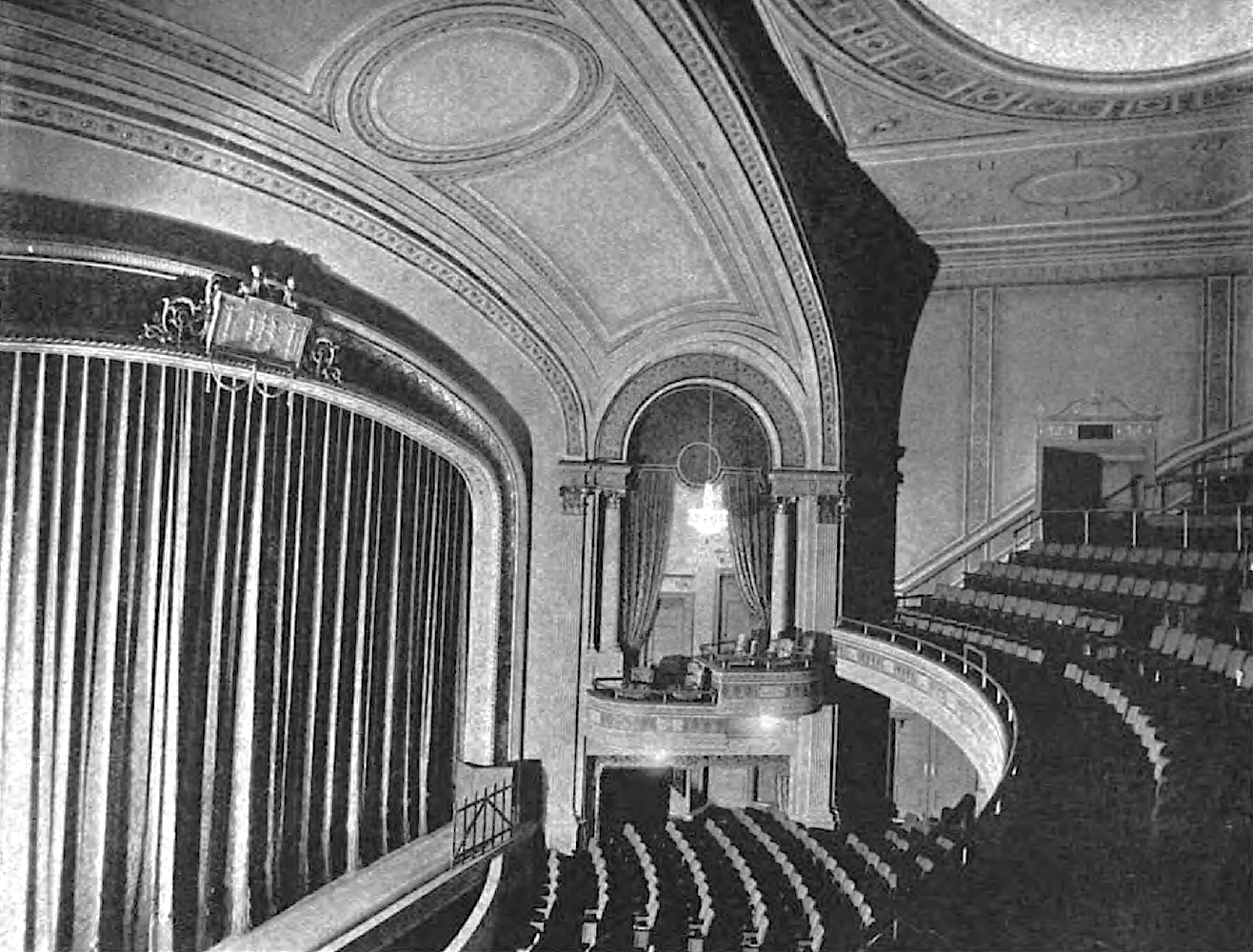
Interior of the original Apollo Theatre

Even though the LPC had not designated the Apollo or Lyric theaters as landmarks, parts of the buildings were still subject to preservation guidelines. In conformance with these guidelines, Drabinsky and architect Peter H. Kofman presented their proposal for the new theater in December 1995. The plans called for preserving much more of the theaters' original detail than was required. The next month, Drabinsky announced further details of the project, which was to cost $22.5 million. Livent's new theater would not require public subsidies, If it was completed before December 1997, the theater would qualify for a tax credit given to new developments in Times Square, which would be worth $4–5 million. In addition, Livent would not pay any real-estate taxes on the theater.

While the combined theater was initially advertised as a restoration of the two existing theaters, the former venues were ultimately completely demolished. Beyer Blinder Belle and Peter Kofman were hired to design the new, larger theater, construction of which began in June 1996. About 190 short tons (170 long tons; 170 t) of plaster decorations inside the two former theaters were removed for restoration, including the Apollo's proscenium arch, box seats, and ceiling dome. The architects also preserved a medallion of Zeus from the Lyric's proscenium and three small domes from the Apollo, though they were not required to do so. The larger decorations were cut into several sections using masonry blades, while the smaller decorations were removed intact. These decorations were stored in New Jersey. A team led by Jean-Francois Furieri then restored and cleaned the plaster decorations off-site.

By December 1996, the four-story facade of the old Lyric Theatre was the only portion of the two old theaters that was left in place. The facade was shored up using scaffolding and a steel framework. The next month, the Ford Motor Company announced it would sponsor the theater, which would become the Ford Center for the Performing Arts. According to the New York Daily News, this was the first corporate sponsorship of a Broadway theater "in most theatergoers' memory", as Broadway theaters were typically named for actors or theater operators rather than companies. Work progressed quickly so the theater could be finished by the end of 1997. The steel skeleton was being erected by February 1997 and the prefabricated facade panels were shipped from Canada after the roof was installed in June. The decorative details from the previous theaters were being installed by that August. Upon its completion, the Ford Center had 1,821 seats, making it Broadway's second-largest venue after the Gershwin Theatre.

=== Operation ===
==== Opening and Livent's bankruptcy ====
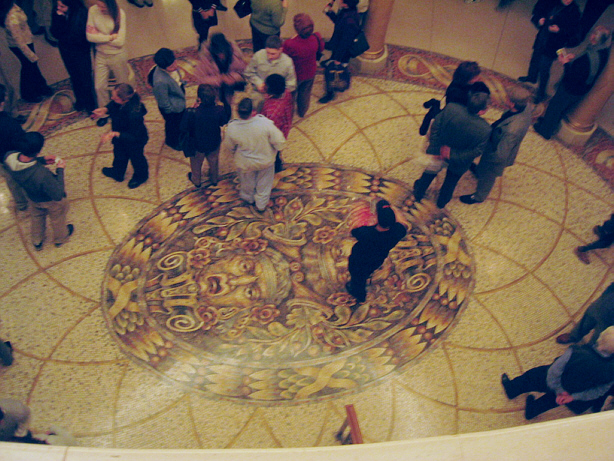
Lobby floor

Drabinsky, New York governor George Pataki, mayor Rudy Giuliani, and several theatrical personalities dedicated the Ford Center for the Performing Arts on December 12, 1997. Summarizing the reactions from architectural and theatrical critics, The New York Times characterized the Ford Center as "a nearly universally praised building that, with musical theater houses in short supply, Broadway and New York City needed". The editorial board of Architecture magazine said the Ford Center was one of several "glorious recent examples of preservation's virtues". A critic for The Journal News wrote that the Ford Center "shows that you can not only open a new theater, but you can also open a new theater that looks as good as an old one". Conversely, Herbert Muschamp of the Times said the Ford Center "offers an architectural glimpse through the rearview mirror".

The theater's first performance was on December 26, 1997, when previews opened for the musical version of E.L. Doctorow's Ragtime. The musical officially opened on January 26, 1998. By that November, less than a year after the Ford Center opened, Livent had filed for chapter 11 bankruptcy protection. Broadway producers attributed the bankruptcy proceedings in part to the costs of the Ford Center's construction and of Livent's frequent full-page advertisements in The New York Times. As a result of the bankruptcy proceedings, Livent faced the prospect of selling its assets, such as the Ford Center; subsequently, several firms sought to buy Livent or its theaters. In August 1999, SFX Entertainment bought Livent's assets, including the Ford Center. The theater also hosted events such as a 52nd-birthday fundraiser for Hillary Clinton, then the First Lady of the United States, in 1999. Ragtime closed in early 2000, after 861 performances, due to extremely high operating costs.

==== 2000s ====
SFX, and with it the Ford Center, was subsequently acquired by Clear Channel Entertainment in 2000. The Ford Center's first new production of the 2000s was a revival of Andrew Lloyd Webber's Jesus Christ Superstar, which opened in April 2000. Superstar ran for 161 performances through that September. Despite the high demand for Broadway theaters, the Ford Center was not immediately booked after Superstar closed; the theater had been scheduled to host a revival of Oklahoma!, which was canceled. The problem was in part due to the Ford's large size, which made it unsuitable for small musicals, as well as the Ford's high operating costs and its difficulty in obtaining additional corporate sponsorships. Ultimately, the musical 42nd Street was revived at the Ford in May 2001. During 42nd Street's run, on September 23, 2001, the theater hosted a special performance of the musical Dreamgirls. Though 42nd Street was profitable during its run at the Ford, the show's producers announced in October 2004 that the show would close due a lack of money. The musical ended at the beginning of 2005 with 1,524 performances.

In November 2004, Clear Channel announced that it had made a ten-year sponsorship agreement with Hilton Hotels & Resorts, with the Ford Center being renamed the Hilton Theatre. The name change happened in advance of the U.S. premiere of Chitty Chitty Bang Bang, which opened in April 2005. Chitty only lasted through the end of the year, with 285 performances; its director Frederick Zollo cited the Hilton's poor sight lines as a reason for his show's failure. The musical Hot Feet next opened at the Hilton in April 2006, but it closed after three months, losing money in the process. That November, Dr. Seuss' How the Grinch Stole Christmas! had a limited engagement at the Hilton. It was followed by the musical The Pirate Queen, which opened in April 2007 and ran for only 85 performances. While How the Grinch Stole Christmas! was profitable during its short run, both Hot Feet and The Pirate Queen closed at a net loss, leading theatrical executives to label the theater as "cursed". Among the complaints were that the costs of renting the theater, as well as its large size, which some producers characterized as "barnlike".

Young Frankenstein opened at the Hilton in November 2007; it was one of the few shows to continue operating through the 2007 Broadway stagehand strike, which occurred shortly after the opening. The musical, which ran for 485 performances through January 2009, was shuttered amid the 2008 financial crisis. The musical Spider-Man: Turn Off the Dark was booked for the theater shortly afterward, although previews were not expected to start until early 2010, leaving the Hilton unused for an entire year. This delay was because the Hilton required extensive renovations for Spider-Man. Further issues arose in August 2009 when Spider-Man ran out of money, causing work at the Hilton to be halted, though construction quickly resumed. The opening of Spider-Man was postponed further by financing and technical issues, as well as the need to rewrite the show. The Hilton Theatre ultimately remained dark for nearly two years due to continued complications with Spider-Man.

==== 2010s to present ====
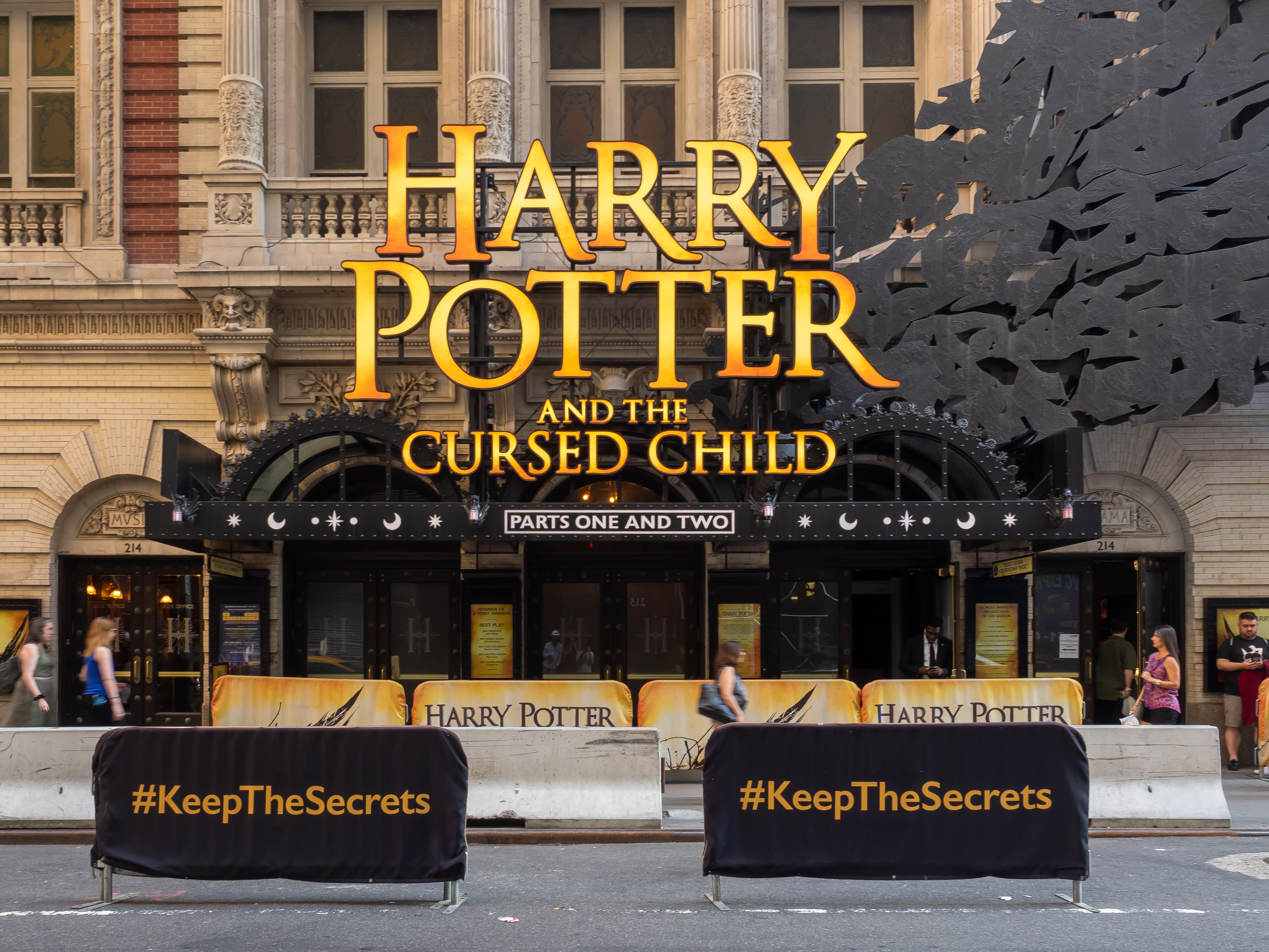
Harry Potter and the Cursed Child at the Lyric Theatre in 2019

In August 2010, under an agreement with Foxwoods Resort Casino and Live Nation, the theater was renamed the Foxwoods Theatre for three years. According to the casino's chief marketing officer, the casino had been especially interested in the theater because of the upcoming show. Previews commenced in December 2010, and Spider-Man officially opened on June 14, 2011, after seven months of previews. The New York Times called the two-year delay between the closure of Young Frankenstein and the first previews of Spider-Man "an eon in a Broadway timetable"; the preview period was itself the longest in Broadway history. In May 2013, during the run of Spider-Man, British theater operator Ambassador Theatre Group (now ATG Entertainment) paid $60 million to lease the Foxwoods from New 42nd Street for up to 60 years. The transaction marked ATG's first United States acquisition. That November, Spider-Man announced it would close at a net loss; the musical ended at the beginning of 2014 with 1,066 performances.

In March 2014, ATG renamed the venue the Lyric Theatre. The musical King Kong had been slated to open at the Lyric, but On the Town was booked there instead after the name change was announced. The theater reopened that October with a revival of the musical On the Town, which only ran at the theater through September 2015. After On the Town's closure was announced, circus producer Cirque du Soleil announced that it would bring the Paramour musical-theater show to the Lyric in mid-2016. The dance-and-musical production Lord of the Dance: Dangerous Games had a limited run during late 2015, after which Paramour opened in May 2016. Harry Potter and the Cursed Child was booked for the Lyric in December 2016, and ATG asked Cirque du Soleil to relocate so the theater could be renovated. When Paramour closed in April 2017, it had run for 366 performances.

During 2017 and early 2018, in preparation for Cursed Child's opening, the theater was renovated for $33 million. The changes included the relocation of the main entrance from 42nd to 43rd Street. A large black wing was added on the 43rd Street facade, while a depiction of a child in a nest was added on 42nd Street. The Lyric was decorated with motifs from the Harry Potter franchise and was reduced to 1,622 seats, bringing the theater's capacity closer to that of other large Broadway theaters such as the Majestic, St. James, and Broadway. Cursed Child opened on April 22, 2018, and it ran until all Broadway theaters temporarily closed on March 12, 2020, due to the COVID-19 pandemic. The Lyric reopened on November 12, 2021, with performances of Harry Potter and the Cursed Child, the run time of which had been shortened during the theater's closure. ATG and Jujamcyn Theaters agreed to merge in early 2023; the combined company would operate seven Broadway theaters, including the Lyric.

== Stage productions ==
Productions are listed by the year of their first performance.

Notable productions at the theater
Opening year	Name	Refs.
1998	Ragtime	
2000	Jesus Christ Superstar	
2001	42nd Street	
2001	Dreamgirls	
2005	Chitty Chitty Bang Bang	
2006	Hot Feet	
2006	Dr. Seuss' How the Grinch Stole Christmas!	
2007	The Pirate Queen	
2007	Young Frankenstein	
2011	Spider-Man: Turn Off the Dark	
2014	On the Town	
2015	Lord of the Dance: Dangerous Games	
2016	Paramour	
2018	Harry Potter and the Cursed Child	

== Box office records ==
In 2012, Spider-Man: Turn Off the Dark achieved the box office record for the Foxwoods Theatre (and the record for the highest single-week gross of any show in Broadway history, at that time). The production grossed $2,941,794 over nine performances for the week ending January 1, 2012. During its third week of previews, Harry Potter and the Cursed Child had the highest single-week gross reported by a non-musical play in Broadway history, grossing $2,138,859 over eight performances for the week ending April 8, 2018. As of January 2024, Cursed Child's largest single gross is $2,718,487 over eight performances for the week ending December 31, 2023.

== See also ==
- List of Broadway theaters
