= Bergen County Academies =

Magnet high school in New Jersey, US

Location
- 200 Hackensack Avenue; Hackensack, Bergen County, New Jersey 07601; United States; 40.902203°N 74.034742°W

Information
- Former name: Bergen Academies
- Type: Public magnet high school
- Established: 1991
- Founder: John Grieco
- School district: Bergen County Technical Schools
- CEEB code: 310118
- NCES School ID: 340147000250
- Principal: Russell Davis
- Faculty: 93.0 FTEs
- Grades: 9–12
- Enrollment: 1,130 (as of 2024–25)
- Student to teacher ratio: 12.2:1
- Colors: Black; Vegas gold White
- Athletics conference: Big North Conference (general); North Jersey Super Football Conference (football)
- Team name: Knights
- Newspaper: Academy Chronicle
- Website: bergen.org/bergencountyacademies

Bergen County Academies (BCA) is a tuition-free public magnet high school located in Hackensack, New Jersey, that serves students in the ninth through twelfth grades from all of Bergen County, in the U.S. state of New Jersey. The school was founded in 1991 by John Grieco, who also founded the public magnet high school Academies at Englewood in Englewood, New Jersey.

The school is currently organized into seven academies: Academy for the Advancement of Science and Technology (AAST), Academy for Business and Finance (ABF), Academy for Culinary Arts and Hospitality Administration (ACAHA), Academy for Engineering and Design Technology (AEDT), Academy for Medical Science Technology (AMST), Academy for Technology and Computer Science (ATCS), and Academy for Visual and Performing Arts (AVPA).

BCA has been recognized as a National Blue Ribbon School, a member of the National Consortium of Secondary STEM Schools, home of eleven 2020 Regeneron Science Talent Search Scholars including two Finalists, and a Model School in the Arts as named by the New Jersey Department of Education.

As of the 2024–25 school year, the school had an enrollment of 1,130 students and 93.0 classroom teachers (on an FTE basis), for a student–teacher ratio of 12.2:1. There were 98 students (8.7% of enrollment) eligible for free lunch and 12 (1.1% of students) eligible for reduced-cost lunch.

== History ==
Bergen County Academies was conceived by John Grieco. The school was founded on a vocational school framework with the mission of preparing students for careers in math and science by promoting a problem-solving, project-based, technical learning environment. It has since departed from this model and adopted a more standard college-preparatory curriculum.

The school originally began as a single academy, "The Academy for the Advancement of Science and Technology" (AAST), which shared the current campus with the Bergen County Technical High School now located in Teterboro. The first group of AAST students was inducted in 1992 for the graduating class of 1996.

In 1997, additional academies opened on the campus: the Academy for Business and Computer Technology (ABCT), the Academy for Engineering and Design Technology (AEDT), and the Academy for Medical Science Technology (AMST). The following year saw the opening of three career institutes, renamed a year later to become academies: the Academy for Culinary Arts (ACA), the Academy for Power and Transportation (APT), and the Academy for Visual Arts and Graphic Communications (AVAGC).

In 2002, APT was eliminated. ABCT was split into the Academy for Business and Finance (ABF) and the Academy for Telecommunications and Computer Science (ATCS). In 2012, ATCS turned its attention away from Telecommunications and towards Technology, and so was renamed the Academy for Technology and Computer Science. ACA added hotel administration to its coursework and became the Academy for Culinary Arts and Hospitality Administration (ACAHA). AVAGC expanded its scope to include performing arts and became the Academy for Visual and Performing Arts (AVPA).

The school itself has also changed its name numerous times, from "Bergen County Regional Academies" to "Bergen Academies" to "Bergen County Academy" and to the present "Bergen County Academies."

BCA was certified to offer the IB Diploma Programme in January 2004, making it one of only 17 schools in New Jersey to offer the IB program at the high school level.

== School structure ==
All academies require four years of English, mathematics, social studies, and physical education, as well as three years of science (biology, chemistry, physics, and/or psychology) and world language (Spanish, French, or Mandarin).

In addition to their regular classes, students of all academies have the opportunity to develop research projects. Research can be conducted in cell biology, chemistry and nanotechnology, stem cells, agriscience, psychology, nano-structural imaging, optics, and mathematics, among other subjects.

== Academies ==
BCA is currently divided into seven academic and professional divisions, often referred to by their acronyms or, colloquially, by their single-word nicknames. However, BCA is treated as a single high school within the district and the state.

The Academy for the Advancement of Science and Technology (AAST; Science) was founded in 1992. AAST focuses on in-depth instruction of the sciences along with the practical applications of the scientific ideas learned in the classroom. By the end of sophomore year, students have taken courses in biology, chemistry, and physics. The academy also features a weekly lab rotation for the first two years. As the academy is science-based, many AAST students take on personal research projects in addition to their regular classes.

The Academy for Business and Finance (ABF; Business) was founded in 2002, separating from the Academy for Business and Computer Technology that was founded in 1997. Students in ABF take courses in economics, marketing, finance, management, business law, management information systems, entrepreneurship, and business ethics. To graduate, ABF students are required to complete a senior thesis and participate in the full IB Diploma Programme. Additional ABF opportunities include participation in DECA, involvement in their global studies program, and special access to the Financial Markets Lab, funded by Bloomberg technology, allowing students to conduct economic research and analysis.

The Academy for Culinary Arts and Hospitality Administration (ACAHA; Culinary) was founded in 1998, originally called the "Academy for Culinary Arts" (ACA). Along with their core classes, ACAHA focuses on hospitality management, entrepreneurship, and the culinary arts. As a part of the academy's curriculum, students receive certification from the National Restaurant Association Education Foundation and the ServSafe Managers program. Though seeking the IB diploma is optional, ACAHA also has access to International Baccalaureate business management courses. Students often participate in the ProStart Hospitality Management competition and SkillsUSA Leadership Conferences, as well as BCA's annual Chocolate Competition.

The Academy for Engineering and Design Technology (AEDT; Engineering) was founded in 1997. The academy was formed "as an extension of AAST", with a concentration in engineering and design. Courses unique to AEDT also explore topics like computer science, architecture, product development, and biomedical engineering. Students often compete in various robotics competitions and other projects, like in the Solar Car Challenge, in BCA's laboratories.

The Academy for Medical Science Technology (AMST; Medical) was founded in 1997. From 9th to 11th grade, students in AMST take courses about various medical fields, such as epidemiology, pharmacology, bioethics, neuroscience, biotechnology, and anatomy & physiology. Students often take on personal research projects in addition to their regular classes. Historically, many have also opted to apply for NREMT certification. Many AMST students participate in BCA's chapter of HOSA, though it is open to all students.

The Academy for Technology and Computer Science (ATCS; Computer Science) was founded in 2002, separating from the Academy for Business and Computer Technology that was founded in 1997, and originally called the "Academy for Telecommunications and Computer Science". ATCS has a focus on the world of computers and the internet. Its students are prepared for careers such as computer programming, software engineering, and other computer and engineering related professions.

The Academy for Visual and Performing Arts (AVPA; Visual Arts, Theater, Music) was founded in 1998, originally named "Academy for Visual Arts and Graphic Communications". AVPA is subdivided into three concentrations: Visual Arts, Music, and Theater.

== Admissions ==
Bergen County Academies' admissions process consists of three main stages: an initial application, an admissions exam, and an interview.

Students will then receive a letter stating if they have moved onto the interview phase. Interviews are conducted on an individual basis by teams of teachers and guidance counselors. Unlike the previous two stages, which are identical for every student, the interview may be personalized according to academy. For example, applicants for AVPA in the Music and Theatre concentrations present an audition, while applicants for the Visual Arts concentration of AVPA participate in an art workshop and present a portfolio.

In 2021, BCA reported that they had a 15% acceptance rate.

== Extracurricular activities ==
=== Clubs ===
During the 2019–2020 school year, BCA had over 130 clubs.

BCA has a Model United Nations team that runs its own Model UN conference for high school students, known as AMUN. The team also runs its own Model UN conference for middle school, known as JAMUN. The BCA Model UN team has won Best Delegation at numerous conferences, including those hosted by Yale University, Princeton University, the George Washington University, and New York University. The BCA Model UN team has also earned many individual delegate awards and is the largest club at the school.

In 2008, BCA's math team won first place in Division B at the Princeton University Mathematics Competition, an annual competition attended routinely by the team. The school routinely has students qualifying for the USA Mathematical Olympiad, with student Alex Zhu winning the competition in 2012. The school captured first place at the 2009 ARML Local competition, another routine annual competition. In 2015, student Ryan Alweiss competed on the American team at the International Math Olympiad, helping the United States win the competition for the first time since 1994 with a 98th percentile score of 31.

BCA's junior varsity and varsity quiz bowl teams qualified to compete in the National History Bowl in 2013, and several individuals competed in the National History Bee.

BCA had a battle BattleBots IQ team, known as the Titanium Knights. The team won the 2006 national heavyweight championship in the high school division with the robot E2V2, and won two other awards for another 120-pound robot, Knightrous. In previous years, the team has won second, third, and fourth place titles in BBIQ, and affiliated student teams have won numerous awards in Northeast Robotics Club events. The BattleBots team was succeeded by the school's "MAKE project", which focused on allowing students to pursue a wider set science and engineering projects and competitions. By 2014, BattleBots was no longer an active club at BCA. However, in 2018, the moniker and spirit of the Titanium Knights were revived by the FIRST Tech Challenge Robotics club, an after-school club. In 2020, both of its teams qualified for the state-wide FIRST Tech Challenge robotics competition.

In addition, BCA also has a DECA chapter that participates in regional, state and international conferences. The club requires all members to be a part of the Academy of Business and Finance. It's the second largest club in the school and has over 100 members. In 2021, three BCA sophomores placed first at DECA’s "Stock Market Game" competition, the first time a team from the school won in that event.

BCA is home to an Amnesty International student group that leads schoolwide events and attends local, regional, and national conferences on human rights.

=== Sports ===
BCA shares its sports program with the Bergen County Technical Schools in Teterboro and Paramus, Applied Technology High School, and the new Career Innovation High School to form the Bergen Tech Knights. The schools compete in the Big North Conference, which is comprised of public and private high schools in Bergen and Passaic counties, and was established following a reorganization of the Northern New Jersey sports leagues by the New Jersey State Interscholastic Athletic Association. In the 2009–2010 school year, the school competed in the North Jersey Tri-County Conference, which was established on an interim basis to facilitate the realignment. Before the realignment, Bergen Tech had been placed in the Northern New Jersey Interscholastic League (NNJIL) at the start of the Fall 2006 athletic season. With 1,669 students in grades 10-12, the school was classified by the NJSIAA for the 2019–20 school year as Group IV for most athletic competition purposes, which included schools with an enrollment of 1,060 to 5,049 students in that grade range. The football team competes in the Ivy Red division of the North Jersey Super Football Conference, which includes 112 schools competing in 20 divisions, making it the nation's biggest football-only high school sports league. The football team is one of the 12 programs assigned to the two Ivy divisions starting in 2020, which are intended to allow weaker programs ineligible for playoff participation to compete primarily against each other. The school was classified by the NJSIAA as Group V North for football for 2024–2026, which included schools with 1,317 to 5,409 students.

Athletic achievements for the Bergen Tech Knights and Bergen Tech Lady Knights include:

- In 2006, the football team reached the playoffs before losing to Randolph High School 29–0. In the same year, the boys' soccer team advanced to the state tournament, winning in the first round before losing to Memorial High School in the semifinal game.
- The tennis team and baseball team advanced to the playoffs in 2009, with the tennis team continuing on to the semifinals after winning sectionals.

== Campus and facilities ==
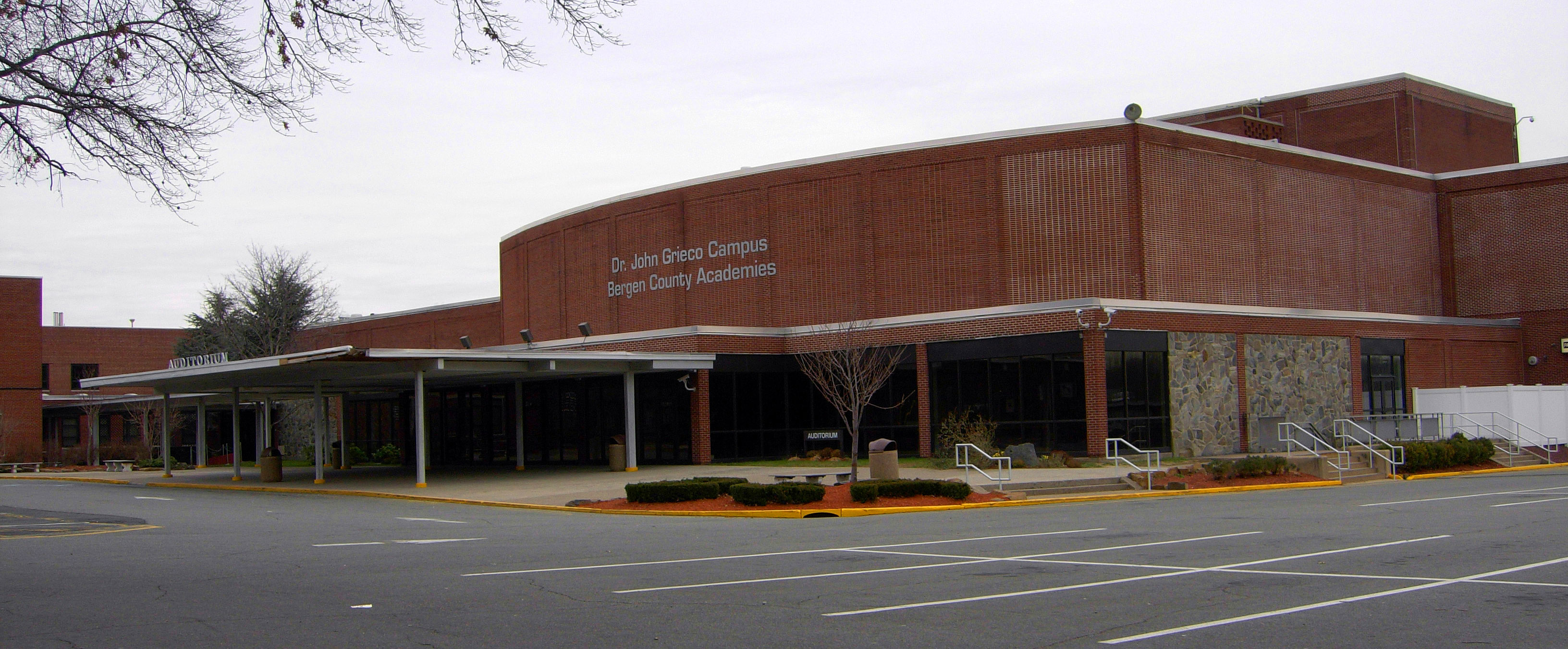
Bergen County Academies auditorium entrance

Bergen County Academies is located on the Dr. John Grieco Campus in Hackensack. The school occupies a sprawling main building which runs along Hackensack Avenue as well as a nearby Environmental Science Center (ESC) building connected to a greenhouse. An auditorium adjoining the main building seats 1,200 people. The school's baseball/softball field, football field, and track are located behind the academic buildings.

Completed in August 2008, the school's cafeteria underwent a massive overhaul that expanded the space from 1,500 to 11,000 square feet.

The school has a variety of science laboratories. The nanotechnology lab opened in 2009 and offers spectrophotometers, differential scanning calorimeter, and a probe station. The cell biology lab opened in 2004 and has a viability analyzer, a chip array bioanalyzer, an electroporator, and microplate readers. The stem cell lab opened in 2006 and features a DNA sequencer, a flow cytometer, RT-PCR and standard PCR machines, and a lypholizer. The optics lab opened in 2008 and is home to one laser scanning confocal microscope, one scanning electron microscope (SEM) and one transmission electron microscope (TEM).

There are also laboratories largely built and designated for specific academies. A dedicated Bloomberg workstation lets students conduct independent financial markets analysis and research. The option to earn a Bloomberg Certification is also available through tutorials. The school features two studio art labs. One of the studios is a visual arts lab equipped with compositing and printing equipment. A video lab broadcasts inside the school and features workstations, professional cameras, and a bluescreen. The school also has a restaurant-grade kitchen for teaching culinary arts.

== Awards and rankings ==
In 2015, Bergen County Academies was one of 15 schools in New Jersey, and one of 9 public schools, to be recognized as a National Blue Ribbon School in the exemplary high performing category by the United States Department of Education. In the same year, Newsweek ranked BCA fifth out of the top 500 public schools in America in 2015 and fourth in New Jersey.

Inside Jersey magazine ranked BCA first in its 2014 ranking of New Jersey's Top Performing High Schools. In the same year, The Daily Beast ranked BCA 15th in the nation among over 700 magnet and charter schools, second among the 25 Best High Schools in the Northeast, and first among schools in New Jersey. The Washington Post designated BCA as one of 23 top-performing schools with elite students intentionally excluded from its list of America's Most Challenging High Schools "because, despite their exceptional quality, their admission rules and standardized test scores indicate they have few or no average students."

In October 2020, Niche ranked the school as the #1 public high school in the nation, as well as the #1 magnet school, #3 college prep public high school, #5 teachers in a public high school, and #7 STEM high school (all for America). It swept all of these categories on the state, county, and New York City area level, with the exception of STEM school, which it came in second for with NJ and NYC area, and college prep, which it came in second for with the NYC area.

In 2021, Niche ranked BCA as the #1 best public high school in America. BCA was also named as one of the 23 highest performing high schools in the United States by The Washington Post.

During the 2019-2020 school year, Bergen County Academies had the best graduation rate and SAT scores in the state of New Jersey.

== Administration ==
The school's principal is Russell Davis. His core administration team includes the vice principal.

== Notable alumni ==
- Harry Altman (class of 2005), featured in the 2002 documentary film Spellbound about the Scripps National Spelling Bee
- Shakira Barrera (born 1990, class of 2008), dancer and actor who has appeared in the Netflix series GLOW
- Jeremy Feigenbaum (born 1989, class of 2007), first Solicitor General of New Jersey, representing various states in Trump v. CASA
- George Hotz (born 1989, class of 2007), known for computer and device hacking
- Sachin H. Jain (born 1980, class of 1998), CEO of CareMore and former Chief Medical Information Officer of Merck
- Sarah-Nicole Robles (born 1991, class of 2010), actress and voice actress, best known for providing the voice of Luz Noceda in the Disney Channel animated series The Owl House
- Kaavya Viswanathan (class of 2004), author of the controversial 2006 novel entitled How Opal Mehta Got Kissed, Got Wild, and Got a Life, since withdrawn due to accusations of plagiarism
