= Khalil Thompson =

American fencer

Personal information
- Nationality: American
- Born: February 3, 1997 (age 29) Los Angeles
- Relative: Kamali (sister)

Sport
- Sport: Fencing

Khalil Thompson (born February 3, 1997) is an American fencer. He qualified to represent Team USA in the 2020 Tokyo Summer Olympics as an alternate on the men's sabre team, which ranked 8th.

== Career highlights ==
- Senior World Championship Teams: 2019
- Pan American Championship Teams: 2019 (Gold - Team)

== See also ==
- List of Pennsylvania State University Olympians
