= Robert Weissberg =

American political scientist and writer (born 1941)

- Born: 1941 (age 84–85); United States
- Education: Teaneck High School
- Alma mater: Bard College; University of Wisconsin
- Occupations: Political scientist, writer

Robert Weissberg (/ˈvaɪsbɜːrɡ/; born 1941) is an American political scientist and writer. He was a professor of political science at the University of Illinois and is the author of twelve books on politics and pedagogy. He published numerous scientific papers in leading journals in political science. Weissberg has also written for outlets such as Forbes, Society, The Weekly Standard and American Thinker.

== Education and academic career ==
Raised in Teaneck, New Jersey and a graduate of Teaneck High School, Weissberg earned an A.B. from Bard College and a Ph.D. in political science from the University of Wisconsin. He was an assistant professor at Cornell University and later associate and full professor at the University of Illinois at Urbana-Champaign from where he retired in 2003.

== Reputation ==
In his 2010 book, Bad Students, Not Bad Schools Weissberg argued that students, rather than teachers or curriculum, are the root cause of poor educational outcomes. A review in the Journal of School Choice praised the book as bold and readable, but also criticized what the author viewed as occasionally an "intellectually lazy and (arguably) racist" argument. Weissberg's In April 2012, in the wake of the John Derbyshire firing, National Review ended its relationship with Weissberg, noting that the editors had only recently discovered that Weissberg had "participated in an American Renaissance conference where he delivered a talk about the future of white nationalism."

== Books ==
- American Democracy: Theory & Reality (1972), ASIN B000SGT9O4.
- Political Learning, Political Choice, & Democratic Citizenship (1974). ISBN 978-0136849933.
- Elementary Political Analysis (co-authored with Herbert Jacob) (1975). ISBN 978-0070321366.
- Public Opinion and Popular Government (1976). ISBN 978-0137379088.
- Understanding American Government (1979). ASIN B000OA72PM.
- Political Tolerance: Balancing Community and Diversity (1998). ISBN 978-0803973435.
- The Politics of Empowerment (1999). ISBN 978-0275964269.
- Democracy and the Academy (2000). ISBN 978-1560727835.
- Polling, Policy, and Public Opinion: The Case Against Heeding the "Voice of the People" (2002). ISBN 978-0312294953.
- The Limits of Civic Activism: Cautionary Tales on the Use of Politics (2004). ISBN 978-0765802613.
- Pernicious Tolerance: How Teaching to "Accept Differences" Undermines Civil Society (2008). ISBN 978-1412845793.
- Bad Students, Not Bad Schools (2010). ISBN 978-1412813457.

== Articles ==
- "Academic Deception for Fun and Profit". Telos 112 (Summer 1998). New York: Telos Press.
- "The Perils of Keeping America America". Human Events August 25, 2004
