= Ellen Stone (horn player) =

American horn player

Ellen Stone (born January 13, 1917) was an American French horn player. She performed with the Pittsburgh Symphony, starting in 1937, and may have been the first female member of the brass section of a major orchestra.

== Biography ==
A native of Bogota, New Jersey, Stone began playing horn at age 16, in Teaneck, New Jersey. She began her training under Etzel Willhoit at Teaneck High School. According to a later article, she practiced "from morning to night – in the garage whither her distracted family banished her." She studied with Lorenzo Sansone, and first attended Oberlin Conservatory for college. She later went to the Juilliard School. The National Orchestral Association awarded her its Philharmonic Scholarship for 1936–37.

In 1937, at age 20, she auditioned for Otto Klemperer, conductor of the Pittsburgh Symphony. After three auditions for him, she was hired as first horn. Stone's hiring may have marked the first time a woman horn player was selected to join a major symphony orchestra. According to Women in Music from October 15, 1937, her engagement provided her with "a six-week term as first horn. That term over, she will continue in that position, or she may be given the also important assignment of third horn." The same article stated that Stone would perform the Strauss Concerto with the orchestra.

Later information is at odds with the Women in Music announcement. She is listed second in the horn section in programs for the 1937–38 season. She did perform a Mozart concerto with the orchestra in a Young People's Concert on February 5, 1938. The concert was conducted by Michel Gusikoff and took place at Carnegie Music Hall. Her bio from the program reads as follows:

Ellen Stone, twenty-year-old member of the Pittsburgh Symphony Orchestra's horn section who will be soloist at the final young people's concert, is the only girl horn player in a major symphony orchestra in the world. Miss Stone, competing in auditions with men players in New York City, was selected as assistant first horn by Dr. Otto Klemperer. A resident of Bogoda, New Jersey, Miss Stone studied the horn and received ensemble training at the Juilliard School of Music and Oberlin College. She won the New York Philharmonic scholarship for 1936-37 awarded by the National Orchestral Association.

Stone does not appear in the Pittsburgh Symphony programs for the 1938–39 season. However, in October 1938 Women in Music published an announcement naming her along with four other women chosen to play in the New Friends of Music in New York. She was named first horn. Stone was featured in an article in Time magazine on November 13, 1939, titled, "Little Girl Blue", in connection with a performance by the New Friends of Music. She is described as

a small, plump, snub-nosed young woman who booped mightily through the brass coils of a big French horn. When she had finished the horn part of Mozart's Quintet in E flat Major, with dignity she dumped the saliva from her horn, rose and went home to practice for this week's concert.

The article goes on, calling her "the best woman French horn player in the world", and describing her lifestyle thus:

Today, 22-year-old, dark-haired Ellen Stone lives with her horn in a little bare-floored room off Manhattan's musical 57th Street. For amusement she goes to the movies, reads "great sociological novels like The Grapes of Wrath." But her big thrills come when her boy friends (mostly fellow horn players) ask her out for an evening of horn duets and trios.

Her name continues to appear with some frequency in The New York Times in connection with performances of the New Friends of Music well into 1943.
