= Richard Lewis Blinder =

American architect (1935–2006)

- Born: June 14, 1935; New York
- Died: September 7, 2006 (aged 71); Shanghai
- Occupation: Architect

Richard Lewis Blinder (June 14, 1935 – September 7, 2006) was an American architect and supporter of historical architectural preservation.

== Background and career ==
Blinder was born in 1935 in New York City. He graduated from the University of Cincinnati School of Architecture and the Harvard Graduate School of Design before establishing residency in Montclair, New Jersey. He was one of the original founders of Beyer Blinder Belle Architects & Planners LLP (BBB), an international architecture firm based in New York City and Washington, DC. The firm's name is derived from the three founding partners: John H. Beyer, Richard Blinder, and John Belle. The three architects met in 1961 while working in the New York office of Victor Gruen. The trio developed a specialty in historic preservation.

At the time of his death in September 2006, Blinder was working on the Shanghai Cultural Plaza, a theater project in the Luwan District. The project was commissioned to Beyer Blinder Belle through an international design competition in 2003 for the redevelopment of a full-block site in central Shanghai's largest historic preservation area, the former French Concession. This development was one of the signature projects undertaken by the Chinese government for the Expo 2010.

Beyer Blinder Belle has won three Presidential Design Awards, the Medal of Honor from the American Institute of Architects New York Chapter, and the national AIA Firm Award, as well as other awards.

== Notable projects ==
- Empire State Building, New York, NY
- Lincoln Center for the Performing Arts Promenade, New York
- Grand Central Terminal, New York
- Rubin Museum of Art, New York
- 15–19 Fulton Street, Manhattan, 1983
- Japan Society, New York
- Ellis Island
- Ford Center for the Performing Arts (now the Lyric Theater)

In 1989, Blinder founded the James Marston Fitch Charitable Foundation, which is dedicated to the curatorial management of the built world. The Richard Blinder Award for architectural studies, a bi-annual grant program, was introduced in August 1997. Conceived by the Fitch Foundation, "" the award highlights studies addressing buildings that integrate preservation and new construction and is inspired by Blinder's ability to preserve architecture through restoration.

== Personal life ==
Blinder died on a business trip in Shanghai, China in 2006 while designing the Shanghai Cultural Plaza. His widow and two children reside in New York City and Maryland.
