= Clarissa Bonet =

Artist and photographer

- Born: 1986 (age 38–39)
- Citizenship: America
- Occupation: Photographer

Clarissa Bonet (born 1986) is an American artist and photographer.

Her work is included in the collections of the Museum of Fine Arts, Houston, and the Museum of Contemporary Photography.

In 2019 she won the Hasselblad X You Grand Prize.
