= Kamali Thompson =

American fencer (born 1991)

Personal information
- Nationality: American
- Born: December 11, 1991 (age 34) Los Angeles, California
- Home town: Teaneck, New Jersey
- Education: BSc, Temple University; MD, Robert Wood Johnson Medical School
- Height: 5'7
- Relative: Khalil (brother)
- Website: kamalithompson.com

Sport
- Sport: Fencing
- Event: Saber
- College team: Temple Owls

Kamali Thompson (born December 11, 1991) is an American fencer and doctor.

== Early life ==
Thompson was born on December 11, 1991, in Los Angeles, California but was raised in Teaneck, New Jersey. Growing up in New Jersey, Thompson originally was a dancer and began Teaneck High School at the age of 12. While watching a fencing demonstration at the school, she was encouraged to learn the sport to gain a greater chance at a college scholarship. She subsequently began fencing during her freshman year and eventually joined the schools team as a junior. Prior to her junior year, Thompson entered a statewide fencing competition where she finished ninth. Following this, she was encouraged to join a fencing club in New York called the Peter Westbrook Foundation. Throughout her high school career, Thompson helped the fencing team finish second in districts, second in the state, and win the Passaic League Championship. She also earned first-team all-county and third-team all-state honors. As she continued to fence, her younger brother Khalil also took up the sport so he would not have to sit on the sidelines during her practices.

Following high school, Thompson enrolled in the Pre-medical degree as part of her biology program at Temple University. She continued to compete in fencing under head coach Nikki Franke and was a two-time winner of Temple's PNC Female Student-Athlete of the Year. She also earned All-American Honors and was a four-time NCAA Qualifier. During her senior year, Thompson was named Philadelphia Inquirer Performer of the Year and nominated for NCAA Woman of the Year.

== Career ==
Upon graduating from Temple University, Thompson enrolled at Robert Wood Johnson Medical School for the 2013 academic year. During her first year in medical school, she helped lead Team USA to a fourth-place finish in Women's Sabre at the 2013 World University Games. Throughout her medical school career, she also established a blog, Saber & A Stethoscope, to document her educational endeavors, travel, and fitness. In 2016, Thompson narrowly missed qualifying for the 2016 Summer Olympics by placing sixth overall. Following this, she won the Division 1 Women's Sabre National Championship title.

In 2019, Thompson was ranked third overall as she helped Team USA win a bronze medal at the Salt Lake City North American Cup. As such, she was named an alternate for the national team. Thompson trained at the Peter Westbrook Foundation.
