= Jeremy Feigenbaum =

American lawyer

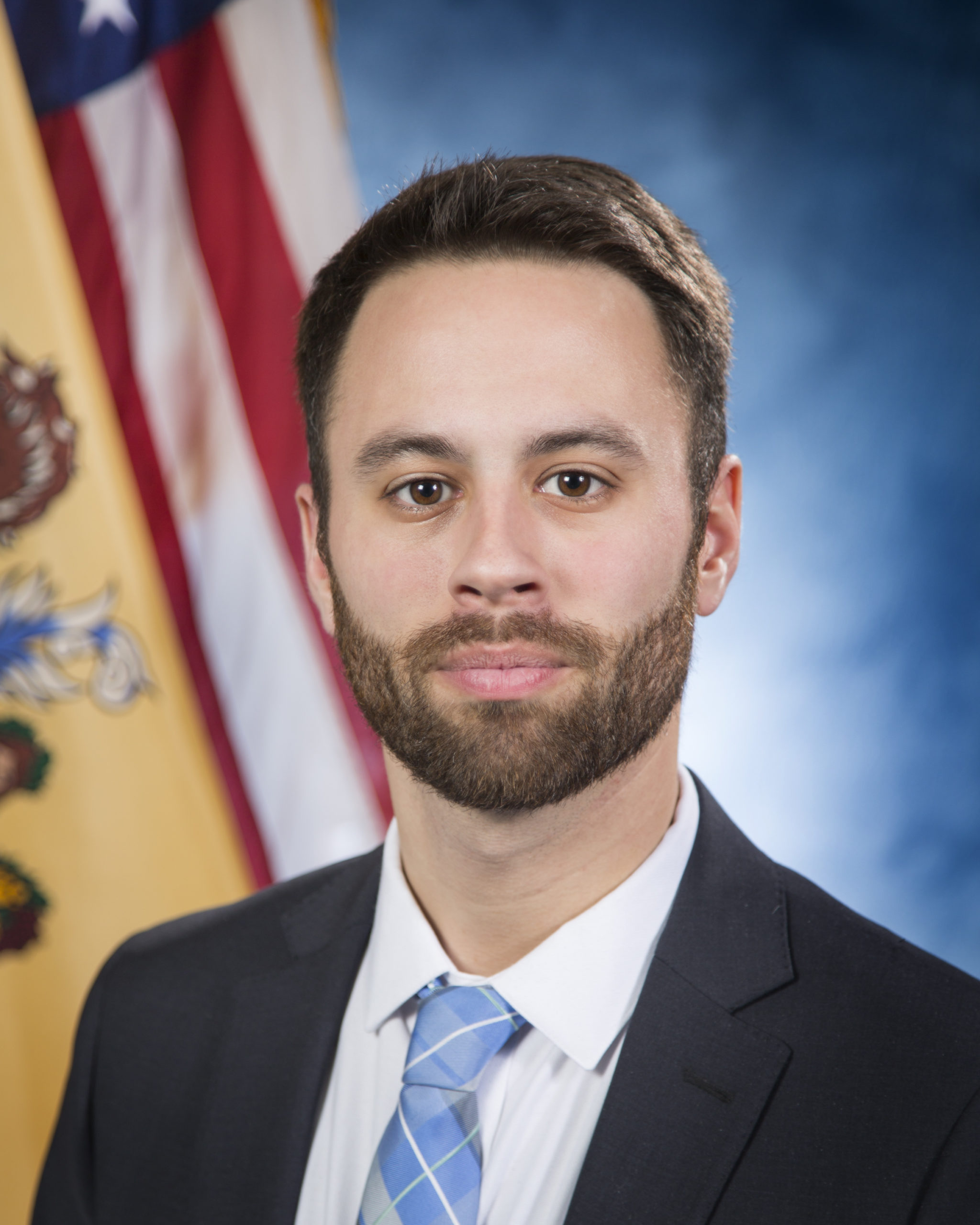
- Official portrait, 2020

Solicitor General of New Jersey
- Incumbent
- Assumed office July 2020
- Appointed by: Phil Murphy
- Preceded by: Office established

Personal details
- Education: Brown University (BA); Harvard University (JD)

Jeremy Michael Feigenbaum is an American lawyer who has served as the inaugural Solicitor General of New Jersey since July 2020.

== Early life and education ==
Feigenbaum grew up in Teaneck, New Jersey, and graduated from Bergen County Academies in 2007. He then attended college at Brown University, where he wrote for The Brown Daily Herald, graduating in 2011; and is a 2014 graduate of Harvard Law School. After graduating, he clerked for Judge William A. Fletcher of the United States Court of Appeals for the Ninth Circuit and Associate Justice Elena Kagan of the United States Supreme Court, before joining Kirkland & Ellis, and later the New Jersey attorney general's office.

== Cases ==
He represented New Jersey in the case of Trump v. CASA in 2025. Previously, he also argued for the state in New York v. New Jersey (2023), which was found unanimously in the state's favor. His first U.S. Supreme Court oral argument was in Penn East v. New Jersey (2021).

== Personal life ==
Feigenbaum married Adam Amir in September 2023.
