= Alison Desir =

American author

Alison Mariella Désir is an American author, activist, and runner. She is the founder of Harlem Run, creator of Run 4 All Women and serves as Oiselle’s director of sports advocacy and co-chairs the Running Industry Diversity Coalition.

Désir's first book, Running While Black (Penguin Books), was published on October 18, 2022.

== Personal life ==
Désir is of Haitian and Colombian descent and was raised in Teaneck, New Jersey. She graduated from Columbia University in 2007.

As of 2022, Désir lived outside Seattle, Washington.
