= Naomi G. Eichen =

American judge (born 1938)

Judge of the New Jersey Superior Court, Appellate Division
- Incumbent
- Assumed office 1994
- Appointed by: Christine Todd Whitman

Personal details
- Born: Naomi Barbara Gerber; February 3, 1938 (age 87); Pennsylvania
- Education: University of Pennsylvania (BA, 1956); Fairleigh Dickinson University (MA, 1969); Rutgers Law School - Newark (JD, 1974)

Naomi Barbara Eichen (née Gerber; born February 3, 1938) is a retired judge of the New Jersey Superior Court, Appellate Division. She was appointed to the bench in 1994 by Governor Christine Todd Whitman.

Eichen was a resident of Teaneck, New Jersey. She married Albert Eichen in 1958; they had two children (William and Ann).
