= Efrem Goldberg =

Rabbi Efrem Goldberg

Personal life
- Born: Teaneck, New Jersey, United States
- Spouse: Yocheved Goldberg
- Children: 6 daughters
- Notable work(s): Behind the Bima; Living with Emunah
- Education: Yeshivat Kerem B'Yavneh; Yeshiva University (B.A.)
- Occupation: Rabbi, author, lecturer, podcaster

Religious life
- Religion: Judaism
- Denomination: Orthodox Judaism

Jewish leader
- Position: Senior Rabbi
- Synagogue: Boca Raton Synagogue
- Began: 2005
- Other: Vice President of the Rabbinical Council of America; Co-Chair of the Orthodox Rabbinical Board's Va'ad Ha'Kashrus
- Semikhah: Rabbi Isaac Elchanan Theological Seminary

Rabbi Efrem Goldberg is an American Orthodox rabbi, writer, lecturer, and podcaster. He serves as the senior rabbi of Boca Raton Synagogue in Boca Raton, Florida, one of the largest Orthodox congregations in the United States. Goldberg is co-host of the prominent podcast Behind the Bima, alongside Rabbi Philip Moskowitz. He has also served in national rabbinic leadership roles, including as vice president of the Rabbinical Council of America.

== Early life and education ==
Goldberg grew up in Teaneck, New Jersey. He studied for two years at Yeshivat Kerem B'Yavneh in Israel, earned a B.A. in psychology from Yeshiva University, and received rabbinic ordination from the Rabbi Isaac Elchanan Theological Seminary. In 2008, he completed the Advanced Executive Program at the Kellogg School of Management at Northwestern University.

== Rabbinic career ==
Goldberg came to Boca Raton in 1999 as a member of the Boca Raton Community Kollel, where he founded the BRS Lome Explanatory Service and started learning and outreach programs. He became assistant rabbi of Boca Raton Synagogue in 2001, associate rabbi in 2003, and senior rabbi in 2005.

During Goldberg's tenure as senior rabbi, Boca Raton Synagogue grew from about 400 families in 2005 to about 1,000 families by 2025, according to the Jewish News Syndicate. In 2025, JNS reported that the congregation was planning a $20 million expansion of its synagogue campus.

Goldberg has held several communal and rabbinic positions in South Florida. The Orthodox Union describes him as co-chair of the Orthodox Rabbinical Board's Va'ad Ha'Kashrus, director of the Rabbinical Council of America's South Florida Regional Beis Din for Conversion, and posek of the Boca Raton Mikvah. He has also served on the boards of Jewish communal and educational organizations, including the Jewish Federation of South Palm Beach County, Hillel Day School, Torah Academy of Boca Raton, and Friends of the Israel Defense Forces. Goldberg has served as vice president of the Rabbinical Council of America, chairman of the Orthodox Union Legacy Group, and a member of the AIPAC National Council.

In 2010, Goldberg was recognized as one of South Florida's Most Influential Jewish Leaders. On April 5, 2011, he delivered the opening prayer as guest chaplain of the United States House of Representatives.

== Media and writing ==
Goldberg launched Behind the Bima in 2020. The podcast features Goldberg with Rabbis Philip Moskowitz and Josh Broide of Boca Raton Synagogue in unscripted discussions about contemporary Jewish issues, synagogue leadership, and communal life, often with outside guests. Guests listed on the podcast's website have included Nissim Black, Judge Ruchie Freier, Avraham Fried, Rabbi Yitzchak Dovid Grossman, Robert Kraft, Mariano Rivera, Sheryl Sandberg, and Ben Shapiro.

Goldberg also hosts the podcast Living with Emunah, which is updated weekly.

Goldberg has written essays for the Orthodox Union and Aish.com.

== Personal life ==
Goldberg is married to Yocheved Goldberg. They have six daughters.
