= Paul Shambroom =

American photographer

Paul Shambroom (born 1956) is an American photographer and graduate from the Minneapolis College of Art and Design whose work explores power in its various forms.

He is the recipient of a Guggenheim Fellowship and a grant from the Creative Capital Foundation.

Shambroom was born and raised in Teaneck, New Jersey. He served as student council president while attending Teaneck High School.
