= John H. Beyer =

American architect (1933–2026)

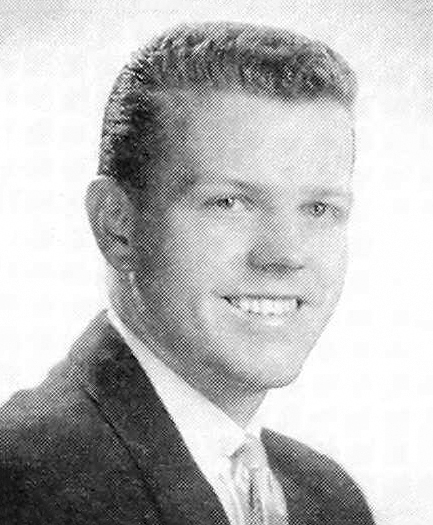
- University yearbook portrait, 1954
- Born: February 13, 1933; Hackensack, New Jersey, U.S.
- Died: January 20, 2026 (aged 92); New York City, U.S.
- Education: Denison University; Harvard Graduate School of Design
- Occupation: Architect
- Spouses: Virginia Van Horn (m. 1958, divorced) Wendy Beyer (m. 1983; died 2026)
- Children: 3

John Henry Beyer (February 13, 1933 – January 20, 2026) was an American architect. He was a founding partner of Beyer Blinder Belle and an advocate for historic preservation of the architecture of New York City.

== Early life and education ==
Born in Hackensack, New Jersey, on February 13, 1933, to Henry and Mildred Beyer, he was raised in Teaneck, New Jersey; his father was a jeweler and his mother a homemaker. He graduated from Teaneck High School in 1950, earned a bachelor's degree from Denison University, majoring in music and sculpture, and then earned both a bachelor's degree and master's degree from the Harvard Graduate School of Design, where he majored in architecture.

== Career ==
Hired as an employee of shopping mall architect Victor Gruen after graduating from Harvard, Beyer met his future partners John Belle and Richard Lewis Blinder in the early 1960s. They connected through their shared view that postwar large-scale urban redevelopment was stripping cities of the very things that made them enjoyable, productive places to live. Together they founded an architectural firm in 1968 based in Greenwich Village dedicated to many of the principles that Jane Jacobs posited in her book The Death and Life of Great American Cities, in which she proposed that urban communities should maintain their character, rather than be demolished and replaced by high-rise buildings as part of urban renewal projects.

In August 1978, Beyer and his firm were hired by the Township Council of Teaneck, New Jersey, his hometown, to develop plans for an $837,000 redesign of the Teaneck Public Library funded by a grant from the United States government.

The firm was retained by the Metropolitan Transportation Authority to plan a $113.8 million restoration of Grand Central Terminal that would remove much of the grime that had covered the building over a span of decades since its opening in 1913. The project included the addition of a new staircase and the thorough cleaning of the ceiling in the main concourse to make the once-hidden painted skyscape and constellations visible, helping turning it into one of the city's most visited attractions. After the September 11 terrorist attacks, which Beyer experienced a block away when the first tower was struck, the firm was selected to develop a master plan for the rebuilt World Trade Center that ended up largely being implemented as Beyer and his team had initially envisioned.

Beyer was elected in 1979 as a Fellow of the American Institute of Architects.

== Personal life and death ==
Beyer married the former Virginia Van Horn in December 1958; the marriage ended in divorce. He and his second wife, Wendy Beyer, were married in 1983 and had three children.

Beyer died at his home in Manhattan on January 20, 2026, at the age of 92. His wife, Wendy, had died ten days earlier.
