= Solicitor General of New Jersey =

Top appellate lawyer for the US state of New Jersey

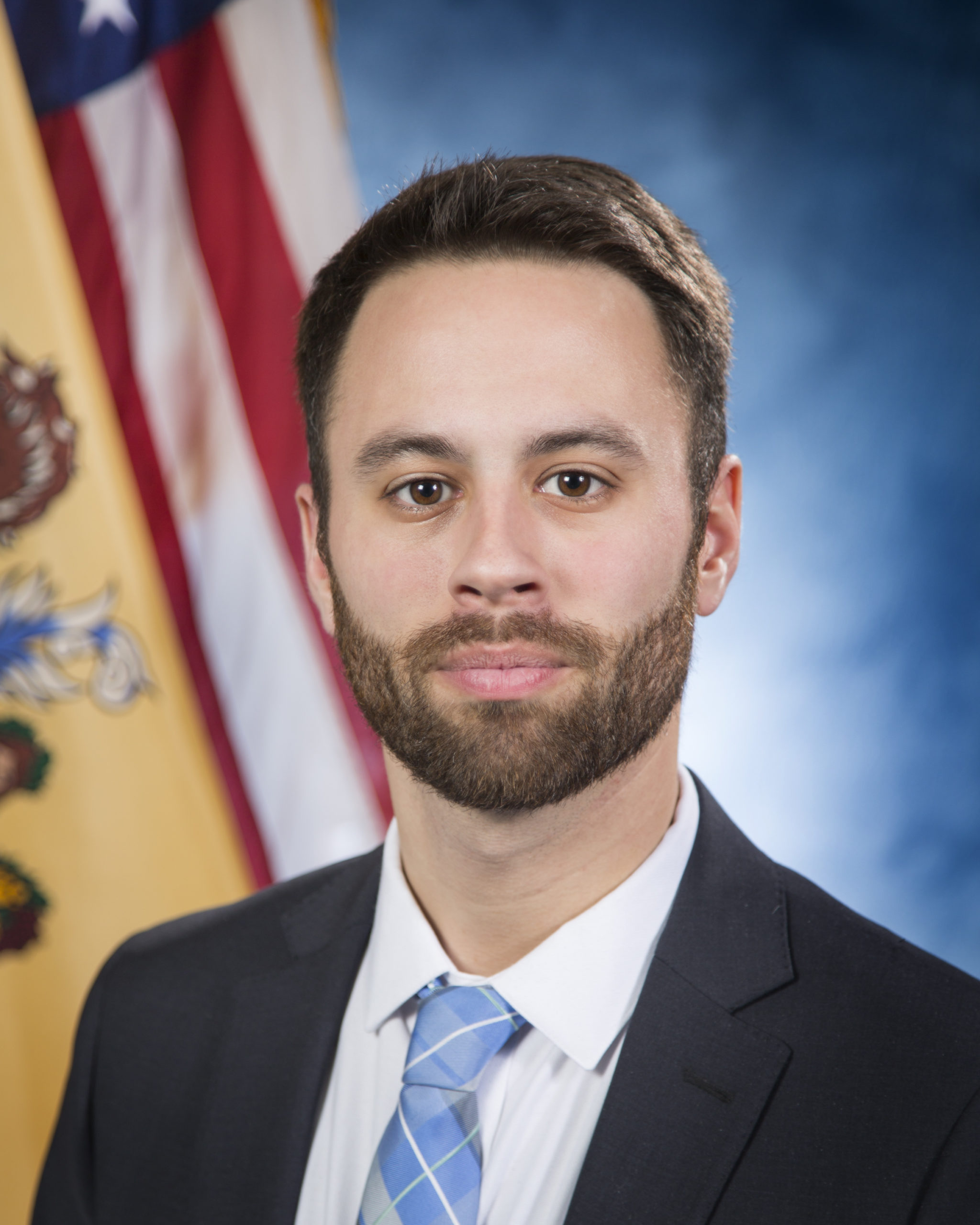
- Incumbent; Jeremy Feigenbaum since July 2020
- Appointer: Governor of New Jersey
- Term length: No fixed term
- Formation: July 2020
- First holder: Jeremy Feigenbaum
- Website: Official website

The Solicitor General of New Jersey is the top appellate lawyer (solicitor) for the U.S. state of New Jersey. It is an appointed position in the Office of the Attorney General of New Jersey that focuses on the office's major appellate cases. The majority of the cases handled by the solicitor are argued in the United States Supreme Court and the Supreme Court of New Jersey. However some cases within the solicitor's responsibilities are under the jurisdiction of the United States Court of Appeals for the Third Circuit and the state appellate courts. The solicitor represents the Attorney General of New Jersey before the Supreme Court of New Jersey and other appellate courts, as needed. The Office of the Solicitor General writes most of the amicus briefs filed by the New Jersey attorney general's office.

== History ==
The position was created in July 2020 by New Jersey Governor Phil Murphy and was first filled by Jeremy Feigenbaum. It is a similar position to solicitors in many states and is modeled after the Solicitor General of the United States.
