= Beyer Blinder Belle =

International architecture firm

Beyer Blinder Belle Architects & Planners LLP
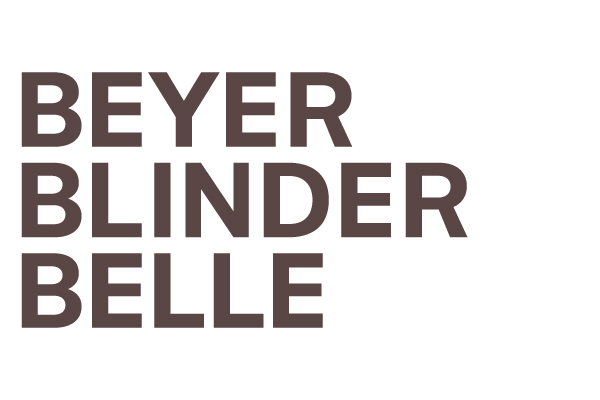
- Founded: New York City, New York, United States (1968)
- Founder: John H. Beyer, John Belle, Richard Blinder
- Headquarters: 120 Broadway, New York City, New York, USA (Additional office in Washington, D.C.)
- Services: Adaptive reuse, Architecture, Interiors, Planning, Preservation, Restoration, Sustainable Design, Urban Design
- Number of employees: 185
- Website: www.beyerblinderbelle.com

Beyer Blinder Belle Architects & Planners LLP (BBB) is an international architecture firm. It is based in New York City and has additional offices in Washington, DC and Boston, MA. The name is derived from the three founding partners: John H. Beyer (1933–2026), Richard Lewis Blinder (1935–2006), and John Belle (1932–2016). They met in 1961 while working in Victor Gruen's New York office and developed a specialty in historic preservation.

In the decades since BBB was established in 1968, it has won three Presidential Design Awards, the Medal of Honor from the American Institute of Architects New York Chapter and the national AIA Firm Award, among others.

In 2008, managing partner Frederick Bland was appointed as a commissioner of the New York City Landmarks Preservation Commission, an agency responsible for protecting and preserving the city's significant buildings and sites.

== Select projects ==
- 15–19 Fulton Street, Manhattan, 1983
- 1838 Peter Augustus Jay House at the Jay Estate in Rye, New York
- Bryant Arts Center at Denison University, Granville, Ohio
- Budapest Exchange Palace, Budapest, Hungary
- Watchcase Factory, Sag Harbor, New York
- Beacon Theatre, New York, NY
- Brooklyn Navy Yard BLDG 92, New York, NY
- Century Center for the Performing Arts, New York, NY
- Cooper-Hewitt National Design Museum New York, NY
- District of Columbia Courthouse, Washington, DC
- Domino Sugar Refinery (Brooklyn), Brooklyn, NY
- Empire State Building, New York, NY
- Grand Central Terminal, New York, NY
- High Line Maintenance & Operations Building (M&O), New York, NY
- Japan Society, New York
- Lincoln Center Promenade, New York, NY
- Marine Air Terminal New York, NY
- Maryland House of Delegates Chamber, Annapolis, MD
- Morgan Library & Museum, New York, NY
- Natick Collection, Natick, Massachusetts
- Princeton University Campus Master Plan, Princeton, New Jersey
- Red Star Line Museum, Antwerp, Belgium
- Rubin Museum of Art, New York, NY
- Saint Paul Union Depot, St. Paul, Minnesota
- Sports Museum of America, New York, NY
- TWA Flight Center, Queens, NY
- Thurgood Marshall United States Courthouse, New York, NY
- Union Station, Washington DC expansion
- World Trade Center site planning, New York, NY
