= Eleanor Kieliszek =

American politician

Mayor of Teaneck, New Jersey
- In office July 1990 – 1992
- Deputy: Charles Grady
- Preceded by: Francis Hall
- Succeeded by: John Abraham

Mayor of Teaneck, New Jersey
- In office May 28, 1974 – June 1978
- Deputy: Max A. Hasse, Jr. John P. Dougherty; Dorothy Silverstein; Francis Hall
- Preceded by: Frank W. Burr
- Succeeded by: Francis Hall

Personal details
- Born: Eleanor Manning; September 25, 1925 The Bronx, New York City, New York
- Died: May 16, 2017 Teaneck, New Jersey
- Spouse: Raymond Kieliszek (m. 1948; died 2014)
- Children: Four
- Education: Fairleigh Dickinson University

Eleanor Manning Kieliszek (September 25, 1925 – May 16, 2017) was an American politician who served as the Mayor of Teaneck, New Jersey, for two tenures, 1974 to 1978 and 1990 to 1992, as well as an elected member of the Teaneck Township Council for 30 years from 1970 until 2000. Notably, Kieliszek was the first woman to serve as the mayor of Teaneck and the first woman elected to the township council.

== Biography ==
Kieliszek was born and raised in The Bronx, New York City, in 1925, the eldest of five children in an Irish Catholic family. In 1948, she married Raymond Kieliszek, planning engineer with the New York Telephone Company, and moved to Bedford–Stuyvesant, Brooklyn. In 1951, she moved to Teaneck, New Jersey, with her husband and their three eldest children. Eleanor Kieliszek had decided to relocate to New Jersey from Bedford–Stuyvesant due to the neighborhood's cement playground and lack of parks for her children. She looked at two towns in North Jersey, but the couple decided on Teaneck once they saw the township's municipal building.

=== Political career ===
Kieliszek first become in involved in politics and public policy by joining the Teaneck League of Women Voters during the 1960s. The League assigned her to cover the Teaneck Planning Board meetings, where she was often the only resident in attendance. Her presence was noted by Matthew Feldman, the then-Mayor of Teaneck from 1962 to 1966, who appointed her to a seat on the township Planning Board.

She received an Associate of Arts degree from Edward Williams College in January 1974. She then enrolled at the School of Business at Fairleigh Dickinson University, where she received her bachelor's degree in public administration in 1979.

In May 1970, Eleanor Kieliszek, who was 44-years old at the time, became the first woman elected to the Teaneck Township Council. She served continuously on Teaneck's Council for the next 30 years from 1970 to 2000. She finished in sixth place out of 16 council candidates to win a seat on the seven-member council. In addition to becoming the first woman elected to the council, Kieliszek was only the third woman to campaign for election to the municipal body. (Two other women, Audrey Kytle and Marion Cerf, had previously run for the council but were unsuccessful).

During her first term on the council, Kieliszek headed the Planning Board and co-chaired the township's American Revolution Bicentennial Committee with Deputy Mayor Isaac McNatt. She won re-election to the Teaneck Township Council in May 1974, this time placing first out of a field of 20 council candidates.

On May 28, 1974, her colleagues on the seven member council elected Kieliszek mayor, making her the first female mayor in Teaneck's history. Using secret ballots, Kieliszek was elected mayor with four votes, defeating councilman Max A. Hasse, Jr., who received three votes.

She served as mayor from 1974 until 1978 for a four-year term. Her achievements included the sale of 350-acres of municipal land to the government of Bergen County, New Jersey. The land included in the sale was later incorporated into Overpeck County Park.

By 1977 out of the 70 municipalities in Bergen County, there were only two other female mayors, Sondra Greenberg of Englewood, New Jersey, who was elected in 1976; and Margaret Schak of Rutherford, New Jersey. Kieliszek often met with Greenberg to discuss issues affecting both municipalities.

Her second mayoral tenure, from 1990 to 1992, came at a much more contentious time in Teaneck's history. On the evening of April 10, 1990, the Teaneck Police Department responded to a call from a resident complaining about a teenager with a gun. After an initial confrontation near Bryant School and a subsequent chase, Phillip Pannell, an African-American teenager, was shot and killed by Gary Spath, a white Teaneck police officer. The protests and trial of Spath drew national attention.

In July 1990, a few months after the Phillip Pannell shooting incident, Teaneck Township Council elected Kieliszek as mayor in the aftermath of the police shooting. According to Paul Ostrow, a council member and later mayor, Eleanor Kieliszek was chosen as the new mayor by her council colleagues due to her experience and ability to fairly listen to a different community stakeholders, "We chose her to be mayor because of her expertise, patience, insight and flexibility during a time when Teaneck was going through tremendous turmoil in the wake of the Phillip Pannell shooting ... There was a lot of anger and frustration among the youth, the African-American community and law enforcement ... She allowed everyone to have a voice and was really one of the forces that helped right the ship." Kieliszek said "A judgment was made within hours that our police officer was a murderer ... There's more hurt than anything else among our residents over the perception of some that this community has not worked to carry out its vision of racial and religious tolerance and harmony."

=== Later life ===
Kieliszek, who had first been elected in 1970, retired from the Teaneck Township Council in 2000, but remained active in local politics. She often met with local politicians and civic leaders, including future Teaneck mayor Mohammed Hameeduddin during his first run for council in 2008. According to Hameeduddin, who spoke of his 2008 meeting with Kieliszek, "I met Eleanor when I first ran for council in 2008. I sat in her house for a good 2½ hours while she talked about the entire history of Teaneck, what it means to be on the council, and what my job would be."

In July 2000, shortly after her retirement from the council, Teaneck dedicated a park named in her honor, Eleanor Manning Kieliszek Greenbelt Park. The park is located on Billington Road, in the vicinity of New Jersey Route 4.

Kieliszek's husband, Raymond, died in 2014. In response, she moved from her home to a smaller apartment, but remained a Teaneck resident.

Eleanor Kieliszek died at Holy Name Medical Center in Teaneck on May 16, 2017, at the age of 91. She was survived by three children, Catherine Cranford, Claire Preschel and Francis X. Kieliszek, while her fourth daughter, Mary Elizabeth Kieliszek, died in 2009.

== See also ==
- List of first female mayors
