= American Shale Oil =

American Shale Oil, LLC
- Company type: Private
- Industry: Oil shale
- Predecessor: EGL Oil Shale
- Founded: 2008
- Defunct: 2016
- Headquarters: Rifle, Colorado, United States
- Key people: Claude Pupkin (CEO) Howard Jonas (CEO, Parent Company), Alan Burnham (Chief Technology Officer)
- Owner: Genie Oil & Gas; Total S.A.
- Website: www.amso.net

The American Shale Oil, LLC (AMSO), originally known as EGL Oil Shale, LLC, was a developer of in-situ shale oil extraction technology based in Rifle, Colorado. It was owned by Genie Energy and Total S.A. In May 2016, Genie Energy announced that the AMSO project was closing.

== History ==
EGL Oil Shale was established as a subsidiary of EGL Resources, a privately owned independent oil and gas company with operations in the southwestern United States. In 2006, it was awarded a lease by the United States Bureau of Land Management to develop and demonstrate its in-situ oil shale extraction technology in Western Colorado. On 22 January 2008, IDT Corporation and EGL Resources signed an agreement, according to which IDT acquired 75% of EGL Oil Shale and renamed it AMSO, LLC. AMSO was formed on 15 February 2008. Shortly thereafter, IDT bought an additional 15% of AMSO, LLC. Subsequently, on 3 March 2009, French oil major Total bought 50% of AMSO, LLC's shares for $3.2 million, with EGL Resources selling their remainder and IDT retaining 50%. IDT's share was subsequently transferred to Genie Energy, which was split off from IDT on October 31, 2011. They were owned by American Shale Oil Corporation, which major shareholder was Genie Energy's oil and gas arm Genie Oil and Gas with 98.3%.

In 2007, the company was awarded the Bureau of Land Management oil shale research, development and demonstration lease in Rio Blanco County, Colorado. AMSO started its pilot well in January 2012, but the operations were interrupted shortly afterwards due to technical problems with a 600 kilowatt electric heater.

By March 31, 2016 the ownership of Total in AMSO, LLC was increased to 58.7%. On February 23, 2016, Total announced its intention to discontinue funding AMSO, LLC and on March 23, 2016 it announced its withdrawal from the project, effective April 30, 2016. Total agreed to pay US$3 million for decommissioning, winding up and dissolution of AMSO, LLC. Genie Energy estimated that the total amount of such cost would be about $5 million, of which Genie's share would be under $2 million.

== Technology ==
AMSO developed a process called "Conduction, Convection, Reflux" (CCR) oil shale conversion. The process combines horizontal wells, which are heated by a downhole burner or other means, and other horizontal or vertical wells, which provide both heat transfer through refluxing of generated oil and a means to collect and produce the oil. At the start of the heating process, oil is injected to improve heat transfer. AMSO has proposed that permeability of the formation sufficient for convection will be achieved by thermomechanical fracturing. The original technology proposed by EGL was based on hydraulic fracturing.)

AMSO believes that by heating the rock more quickly than in the Shell in situ conversion process - 3 to 12 months as opposed to several years - the CCR process will consume less energy and require fewer wells. Researchers at Petrochina who reviewed AMSOs proposed technology in 2008 noted that the output of oil and gas could be faster, but felt that the technical complexity and costs of the proposed technology were shortcomings, and also noted that the fluid flow would be difficult to control and easy to "short-circuit."

== Operations ==
AMSO's operating office was located in Rifle, Colorado. AMSO was also supported by AMSO and Genie staff at the Genie office in Newark, New Jersey. According to an SEC filing by IDT in October 2011, AMSO had four full-time employees and fixed assets of US$15,000. The company leased a 160 acres (650,000 m^{2}) test tract in the Piceance Basin from the Bureau of Land Management.

== Management ==
The company's chairman and chief executive officer was Howard Jonas, the founder and chairman of IDT Corporation. The president was Claude Pupkin. The chief technology officer and project manager was Alan K. Burnham, and the vice president for operations was Roger L. Day.
