= Overpeck County Park =

Park

Coordinates: 40.865°N 74.000°W

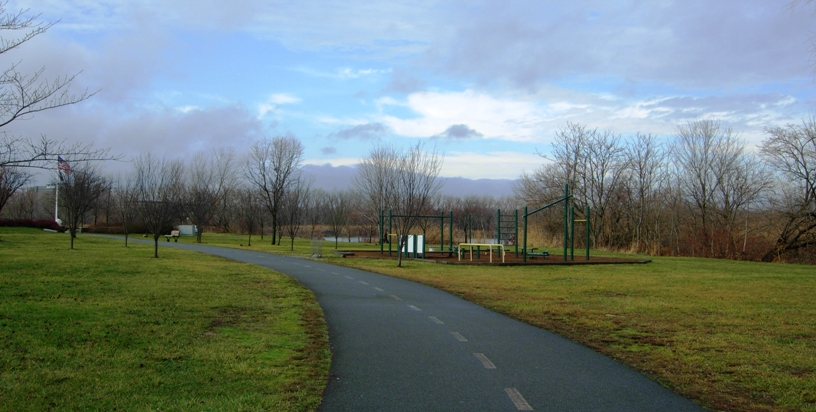
- Henry Hoebel Area of Overpeck Park.
- Interactive map of Overpeck County Park
- Type: County park (Bergen County, New Jersey)
- Location: Leonia, Palisades Park, Ridgefield Park, and Teaneck
- Area: 811 acres (328 ha)

Overpeck County Park is an 811-acre (3.28 km^{2}) county park in Bergen County, New Jersey, with major sections in Leonia, Palisades Park, Ridgefield Park, and Teaneck, surrounding Overpeck Creek, a tributary of the Hackensack River.

The Overpeck Creek flows to the west of the Henry Hoebel Area and the South Area of the park.

== History ==
The first inhabitants of the area were Ashkineshacky Native Americans, who lived around Leonia. Approximately a thousand Native Americans had their seasonal activities, collecting shells for wampum and hosting their bath festivals in Overpeck Creek.

In 1954, the president of the Bergen County Park Commission, A. Thornton Bishop, proposed a plan to build a county park. This park was originally planned to rival Central Park in New York City.

In the 1950s, Leonia, Palisades Park, Ridgefield Park, and Teaneck donated municipal land for the development of the Overpeck County Park. During the 1970s, Teaneck's municipal government, under then-Mayor Eleanor Kieliszek, sold a 350-acre parcel of land to Bergen County, which was later incorporated into Overpeck County Park.

Henry Hoebel Area was the first area to undergo development; the other areas remained undeveloped and were used as dumping sites for garbage and car tires until they posed environmental hazards to their surroundings. The park vicinity was notable being filled with solid waste. Ridgefield Park and Teaneck filed a lawsuit against Bergen County because the park land was not developed and used properly. The project began in 2003 and the expanded park opened in 2010.

In 2002, the Teaneck Creek Conservancy and the Bergen County Parks Department began to establish a 46-acre (190,000 m^{2}) environmental and cultural park as part of Overpeck Park.

Bergen County recently approved $10.5 million in new 2025 park improvement funding, including a $3.88M landfill closure project and a $1.25M short-game golf area at Overpeck. The park has also started an annual "Star-Spangled Spectacular" July 4th concert tradition with the NJ Wind Symphony.

== Regions ==
There are five major regions of the park: (six, if Overpeck Bergen County Golf Course is included)

=== Henry Hoebel Area ===
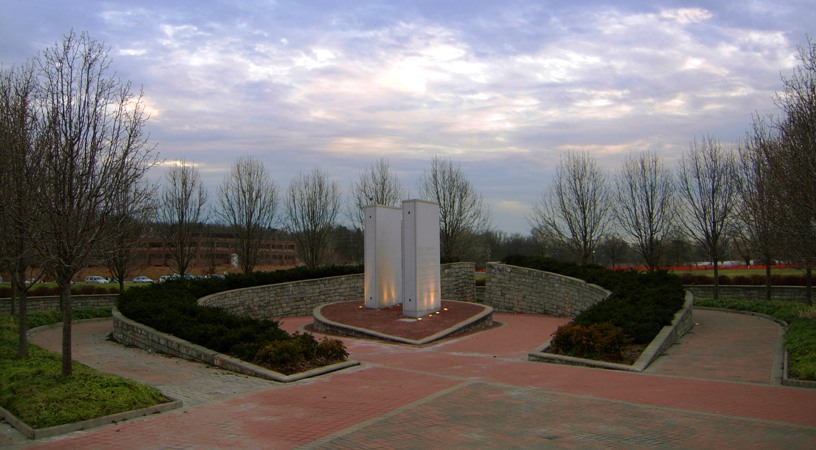
The World Trade Center Memorial in the Henry Hoebel Area.

Area in Leonia alongside Fort Lee Road.

The Henry Hoebel Area consists of a small playground, a 9/11 World Trade Center Memorial, bicycle and jogging path, and track and field. There are six tennis courts, baseball and soccer fields, and two practice backstops. The bicycle-pedestrian path is approximately one and a quarter-mile long and it forms a figure-8, dividing the Henry Hoebel Area into two sections, separated by a tributary of the Overpeck Creek. There is also a dog park.

=== South Area ===
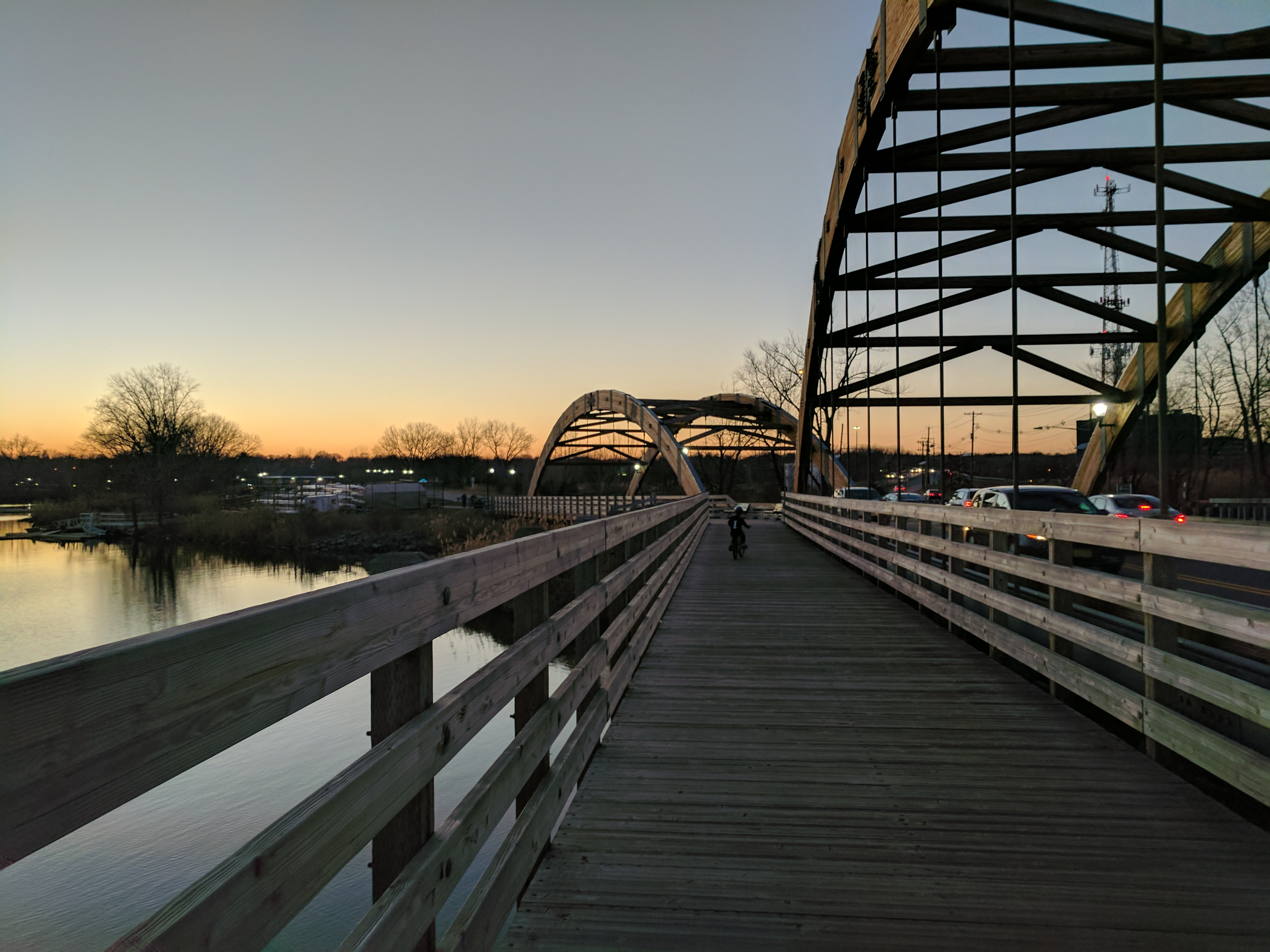
Bridge crossing Overpeck Creek at Overpeck County Park

Area in Leonia south of the Henry Hoebel Area alongside Fort Lee Road.

The Bergen Equestrian Center, formerly known as the Overpeck Riding Center, is located in this area. The center is a horseback riding center that features a riding arena and paddocks.

The area is also used by various rowing ok teams including Teaneck High School and Columbia University.

=== Palisades Park Area ===
Area in Palisades Park along Roosevelt Street. The area consists of four hard surface tennis courts, four premier ball fields (one with artificial turf), an artificial turf football stadium with track, and a tot lot. Picnicking and horseshoes are available.

=== Ridgefield Park Area ===
Area in Ridgefield Park along Challenger Road, off Emerson Road. This area is 22 acres (89,000 m^{2}) and consists of two softball fields, two soccer fields, amphitheater (3,000 lawn seats), six tennis courts, playground, lawn, 700 parking spaces, boat launch, and walking trails. The park's grand opening was on July 5, 2010.

=== Teaneck Creek Park Area ===
Area in Teaneck, between Teaneck Rd, Degraw Avenue, Fycke Lane and the Glenpointe Facility.

This is a 46-acre eco-art park, consists of passive trails and art installations throughout a forested wetland environment. The Teaneck Creek Conservancy, a non-profit, manages the land in partnership with the County of Bergen.
