= Lizette Parker =

American politician (1971–2016)

Mayor of Teaneck, New Jersey
- In office July 1, 2014 – April 24, 2016
- Preceded by: Mohammed Hameeduddin
- Succeeded by: Elie Katz (acting)

Personal details
- Born: August 31, 1971 Harlem, New York City
- Died: April 24, 2016 (aged 44) Teaneck, New Jersey
- Spouse: Tony Parker

Lizette Parker (August 31, 1971 – April 24, 2016) was an American politician and social worker. She served as the Mayor of Teaneck, New Jersey, from 2014 until her death in April 2016. Parker was the first black woman to serve as Mayor of Teaneck, as well as the first black woman to serve as the mayor of any municipality in Bergen County, the state's most populous county. Coincidentally, she succeeded former Mayor Mohammed Hameeduddin, who became the first Muslim to become the Mayor of a Bergen County community in 2010.

== Early life and family ==
Parker was born in Harlem, New York City to Dolores-Ann and Lawrence Phillips, and she was raised in Teaneck, New Jersey. She graduated from Teaneck High School. She received her Bachelor of Arts in sociology from Montclair State University. She also earned a master's degree in administrative science from Fairleigh Dickinson University. Parker worked as a case worker and social work supervisor at the Bergen County Board of Social Services from 1992 until 2016. She had served on the Teaneck Township Council from 2006 until her death in 2016.

She was married to Anthony Parker The couple had one daughter, Alyssa, four-year-old at the time of her mother's death.

== Mayoralty ==
Parker was re-elected to the council in the Teaneck municipal election on May 13, 2014, receiving the most votes of any member of the council. The choice of mayor in Teaneck is made among council members, and Parker, who served as deputy mayor from 2006 to 2010, the 2010 election was contentious. Traditionally, the council chose the member with the highest vote total in the election to serve as mayor. Estina Baker, president of the Bergen County chapter of the NAACP, said the sentiment against choosing Parker was a matter of "race and gender," and Parker made the same allegation in an "unusually impassioned" speech. After the election, parker and Hameeduddin, who was chosen mayor despite having garnered fewer votes, worked together in a coalition that dominated the City Council.

In 2007, as deputy mayor, Parker performed the ceremony for the first same-sex civil union in New Jersey.

On July 1, 2014, the council unanimously elected Parker as the Mayor of Teaneck. She was sworn into the office at the same meeting. Parker became not only the first African-American female mayor of Teaneck, but also the first black woman to serve as Mayor of any municipality in Bergen County, New Jersey. Her predecessor, Mohammed Hameeduddin, remained in the government as a councilman. As mayor, she was a member of the New Jersey Black Mayors Alliance for Social Justice which spoke out against then Republican presidential hopeful Donald Trump's call to ban all Muslim immigration in the United States.

== Death ==
Parker died in office after a respiratory illness at Holy Name Hospital in Teaneck, New Jersey, on April 24, 2016, at the age of 44. She had recently suffered from cancer. Her current term as mayor would have expired on July 1, 2016. Teaneck Deputy Mayor Elie Katz became acting mayor upon her death.

She was buried in George Washington Memorial Park in Paramus, New Jersey. 600 people attended the funeral.

== Legacy ==
A street in Teaneck is named in her honor. A room at the Teaneck library was named in her honor.

The local chapter of the NAACP created the "Lizette Parker Trailblazer Award".

The Urban League of Bergen County created a scholarship fund to pay for the education of Parker's daughter.

== See also ==
- List of first African-American mayors
