= Elie Katz =

American politician

Elie Y. Katz

Mayor of Teaneck, New Jersey
- In office July 1, 2006 – July 1, 2008
- Preceded by: Jacqueline Kates
- Succeeded by: Kevie Feit

Acting Mayor of Teaneck, New Jersey
- In office April 24, 2016 – July 1, 2016
- Preceded by: Lizette Parker
- Succeeded by: Mohammed Hameeduddin

Personal details
- Born: July 16, 1974 (age 51) Teaneck, New Jersey

Elie Y. Katz (born July 16, 1974) is an American politician and businessman. He served as the Mayor of Teaneck, New Jersey from 2006 to 2008.

== Biography ==
Katz was born on July 16, 1974, in Teaneck, New Jersey. He attended Torah Academy of Bergen County and graduated from Touro College.

Katz was elected to the Teaneck Township Council in 1997. He was elected Mayor of Teaneck in 2006, making him the youngest person to serve in that office as well as the first Orthodox Jew. Katz served until 2008, when he was replaced by Kevie Feit. Katz served as deputy mayor in 2016 when Lizette Parker died in office. He thus filled in as acting mayor for several months until the town council elected Mohammed Hameeduddin on July 1, 2016. On July 2, 2018, Katz was unanimously elected Deputy Mayor I of Teaneck, nominated by Mayor Mohammed Hameeduddin and seconded by Councilman Keith Kaplan. On July 1, 2020, Katz was elected Deputy Mayor I of Teaneck, nominated by Councilman Mark Schwartz and seconded by Councilman Keith Kaplan. On January 3, 2023, Katz was unanimously elected Deputy Mayor 2 of Teaneck during the council's reorganization meeting, after being nominated by Councilmember Hillary Goldberg and seconded by Mayor Michael Pagan.

Katz is currently serving his sixth term on Teaneck's Township Council.

== Business ==
Katz is currently the CEO of National Retail Solutions, a subsidiary of IDT Corporation. He previously worked for Fabrix Systems, Citizens Choice Energy, and Zedge. On January 22, 1996, Katz opened the Kosher Chinese style Restaurant, Chopstix, in Teaneck, New Jersey.
