= National Retail Solutions =

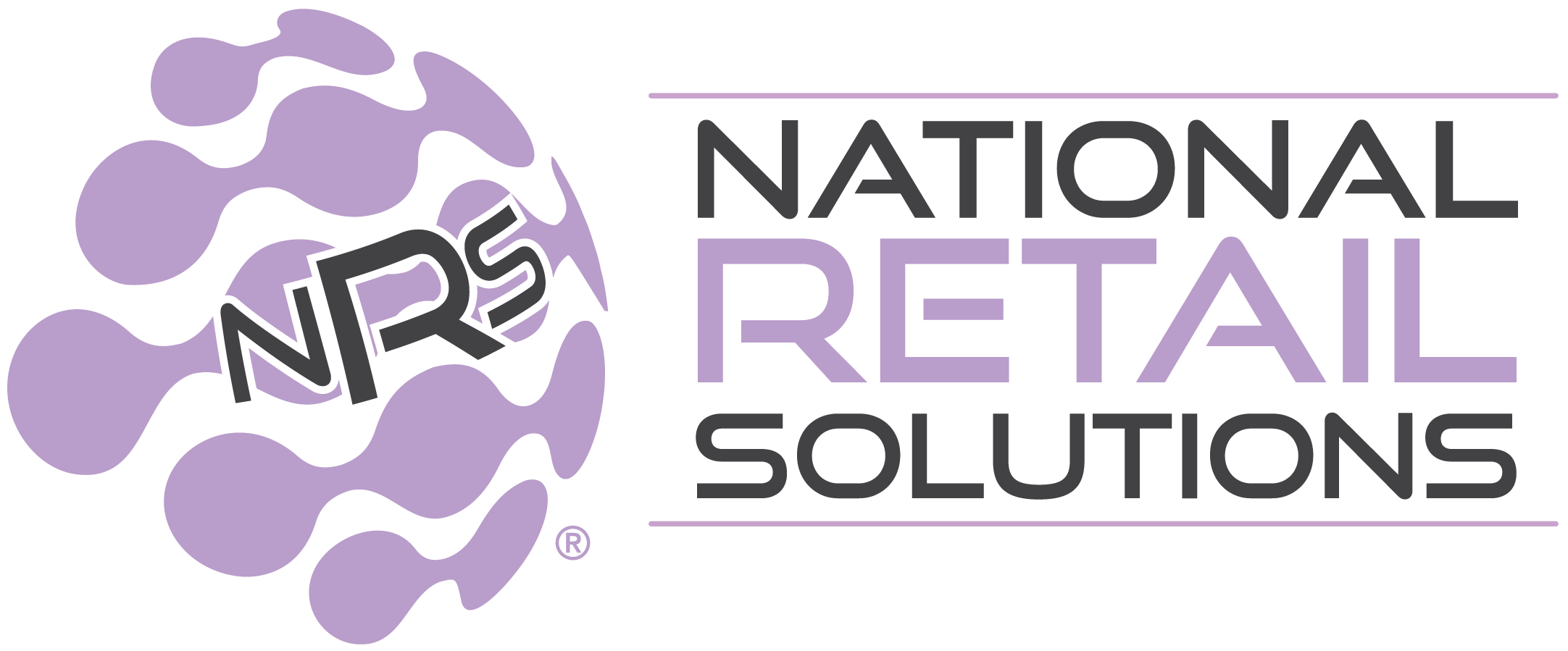
- Founded: 2015
- Headquarters: Newark, New Jersey, U.S.
- Key people: Elie Y. Katz
- Website: nrsplus.com

National Retail Solutions (also known as NRS or NRSplus) is a point-of-sale and retailer services company. The company is the provider of touch-screen point-of-sale (POS) systems that include a customer-facing display screen, as well as integration with payment and transaction processing services. The NRS POS system is ideal for grocery, convenience, liquor, tobacco, hardware, gas station c-stores, and other independent retail businesses. NRS is a division of IDT Corporation and the company has offices worldwide, with headquarters in Newark, New Jersey. The company also provides NRS Pay credit card processing for various independent stores and businesses across the USA and in Canada.

NRS was founded in 2015 by Elie Y. Katz, who owns a number of independent businesses, and served as the Mayor of Teaneck, New Jersey from 2006 to 2008. He is currently the president and CEO. It is headquartered in Newark, New Jersey.

NRS is a subsidiary of IDT Corporation.

== Divisions ==
NRS' divisions include point-of-sale (POS), NRS Digital Media, NRS Pay credit card processing, NRS Insights, NRS Funding (cash advance), NRS Petro (gas station/convenience store) and NRS EBT (assisting stores with the processing of SNAP payments). Programs include Ecommerce, as well as DoorDash and Grubhub integration. NRS is a forerunner in retail technology, with POS Premium Features such as the patented POS Panic Alarm Button, AI Product Recommendations, POS-DVR camera integration, and more.
