= Inna Berin =

American obstetrician

Inna Berin is a Russian-American obstetrician and gynecologist, specializing in reproductive endocrinology and infertility at the Fertility Institute of New Jersey and New York. Dr. Berin has authored several scientific publications in the field of reproductive endocrinology and infertility.

== Life ==
Dr. Berin received her MD from Mount Sinai School of Medicine in 2003, and then continued her professional training in OB/GYN residency at St. Luke’s-Roosevelt Hospital (now Mount Sinai Morningside)l of Columbia University College of Physicians and Surgeons, where she served as an Administrative Chief Resident and authored several papers dealing with infertility.

Reproductive Endocrinology and Infertility at Massachusetts General Hospital, Harvard Medical School, where she has authored several scientific publications and defended a thesis titled: Defining the role of Notch protein family members in progesterone production. She was a recipient of the Dorothy Rackemann Fellowship of Vincent Memorial Hospital, Massachusetts General Hospital, Harvard University, for scholars in medicine.

Dr. Berin is a Certified Diplomate of The American Board of Obstetrics and Gynecology, and an attending physician at Hackensack University Medical Center, Valley Health System, and Holy Name Medical Center. She is a Co-Medical Director, Reproductive Endocrinology and Infertility Specialist at the Fertility Institute of New Jersey and New York, in Oradell, New Jersey.

== Scientific publications ==
=== Thesis ===
- Inna Berin, Jill Attaman, Minji Kim, Aaron K. Styer, Ho Joon Lee, Hideo Sakamoto, Jason E. Bruemmer, David H. Townson, John Davis, Bo R. Rueda. Defining the role of Notch protein family members in progesterone production.

=== Original articles ===
- Berin, Inna; McLellan, Sarah T.; MacKlin, Eric A.; Toth, Thomas L.; Wright, Diane L. (2011). "Frozen-thawed embryo transfer cycles: clinical outcomes of single and double blastocyst transfers". Journal of Assisted Reproduction and Genetics. 28 (7): 575–81. doi:10.1007/s10815-011-9551-7. PMC 3162061. PMID 21373800.
- Groeneweg, Jolijn W.; White, Yvonne A.R.; Kokel, David; Peterson, Randall T.; Zukerberg, Lawrence R.; Berin, Inna; Rueda, Bo R.; Wood, Antony W. (2011). "Cables1 is required for embryonic neural development: molecular, cellular, and behavioral evidence from the zebrafish". Molecular Reproduction and Development. 78 (1): 22–32. doi:10.1002/mrd.21263. PMC 4016823. PMID 21268180.
- Berin, Inna; Engmann, Lawrence L.; Benadiva, Claudio A.; Schmidt, David W.; Nulsen, John C.; Maier, Donald B. (2010). "Transfer of two versus three embryos in women less than 40 years old undergoing frozen transfer cycles". Fertility and Sterility. 93 (2): 355–9. doi:10.1016/j.fertnstert.2009.01.101. PMID 19324343.
- Petrozza, John C; Berin, Inna; Cowan, Bryan D; Smith, Carl V; Gaupp, Frederick B (January 5, 2011). Cowan, Bryan D (ed.). "Recurrent Early Pregnancy Loss". Medscape Reference.
- Berin, Inna; Stein, Daniel E.; Keltz, Martin D. (2010). "A comparison of gonadotropin-releasing hormone (GnRH) antagonist and GnRH agonist flare protocols for poor responders undergoing in vitro fertilization". Fertility and Sterility. 93 (2): 360–3. doi:10.1016/j.fertnstert.2008.11.007. PMID 19131055.
- Berin, Inna; Teixeira, Jose (2008). "Utility of serum antimüllerian hormone/Müllerian-Inhibiting Substance for predicting ovarian reserve in older women". Menopause. 15 (5): 824–6. doi:10.1097/gme.0b013e31817c42f4. PMID 18600185.
- Keltz, MD; Lang, J; Berin, I (2007). "A 5-mm open-entry technique achieves safe, single-step, cosmetic laparoscopic entry". JSLS. 11 (2): 195–7. PMC 3015733. PMID 17761079.
