= Harold J. Vinegar =

American petroleum geologist

- Education: Columbia University (BA); Harvard University (PhD)
- Scientific career
- Fields: Petroleum geology
- Workplaces: Ben-Gurion University

Harold J. Vinegar is a researcher and Professor of Petroleum Geoscience at Ben-Gurion University. He is also President of Vinegar Technologies, LLC. Vinegar is one of the top highly-cited researchers (h>100) according to webometrics.

Vinegar started his career at Royal Dutch-Shell's Houston research facility in 1976 and previously served as chief scientist in physics for the company. He was also the chief scientist of Genie Energy.

Vinegar received his B.A. from Columbia University and Ph.D. from Harvard University. He was elected a member of the American Physical Society in 1999 and the National Academy of Engineering in 2003.
