= Mayors of Teaneck, New Jersey =

Public office in Bergen County, New Jersey, United States

Mayor of Teaneck, New Jersey
- Inaugural holder: William W. Bennett
- Formation: 1895

Teaneck, New Jersey was incorporated on February 19, 1895. It was created in Chapter XXVII in the Acts of the General Assembly of the State of New Jersey in 1895. The office of mayor did not initially exist as such. In 1895, the township form of government was a direct democracy, with a three-member township committee handling the affairs of the township between annual town meetings. The township committee selected a chairman. Historian Griffin wrote that William W. Bennett "was the obvious (and unanimous) choice to serve as Teaneck's first township committee chairman], roughly the equivalent of mayor and manager combined." New Jersey revised township organization in 1899, and in 1910 Teaneck moved to a five-man township committee. On January 1, 1930, the Township selected its last chairman, Lacey Walker. On November 11, 1930, the Township transferred to the Council-Manager form of Government, electing Karl D. Van Wagner to serve as the first Mayor (from among the five council-members) at the reorganization meeting. By 1946, Teaneck had both a mayor and a deputy mayor. The first Deputy Mayor was Henry Diessler. There were twelve Chairmen prior to Karl Van Wagner being elected Mayor in 1930. The 24 Mayors of Teaneck, New Jersey are as follows:

== Mayors ==
Mayor	In office	Left office	Notes
Mark J. Schwartz	January 2, 2025		Mark Schwartz is serving his first term as Mayor after serving on the Township council since July, 2012.
Michael Pagan	January 3, 2023	January 2, 2025	First term as mayor after two years of service on the council.
Jim Dunleavy	July 1, 2020	January 3, 2023	His first and only term as mayor. In office during Teaneck's transition of council elections from May to November. Declined to run for re-election to his council seat in 2022.
Mohammed Hameeduddin	July 1, 2016	July 1, 2020	This was his second term as mayor. The Teaneck Township Council elected Hameeduddin as mayor on July 1, 2016, to fill the rest of the previous mayor's unexpired term. He was sworn into office the same day by Mayor of Jersey City, New Jersey Steven Fulop. Hameeduddin previously served as Teaneck mayor from 2010 to 2014.
Elie Katz	April 24, 2016	July 1, 2016	This was his second term. He was filling in as acting mayor for Lizette Parker, who died in office. Katz was the Deputy Mayor at the time of Parker's death and assumed the role of acting mayor until a new mayor could be elected by the town council.
Lizette Parker	July 1, 2014	April 24, 2016	Lizette Parker (August 31, 1971 – April 24, 2016) was the first African-American woman to serve as mayor of any municipality in Bergen County, New Jersey. Parker died in office on April 24, 2016.
Mohammed Hameeduddin	July 1, 2010	July 1, 2014	This was his first term. Hameeduddin was the first Muslim mayor in Bergen County, New Jersey.
Kevie Feit	2008	July 1, 2010	
Elie Katz	2006	2008	This was his first term. Katz was born in Teaneck, New Jersey, on July 16, 1974. He attended the Frisch School and graduated from Touro College. Katz was elected Mayor of Teaneck in 2006, making him the youngest person to serve in that office as well as the first Orthodox Jew. Katz served until 2008, when he was replaced by Kevie Feit. Katz was serving as Deputy Mayor in 2016 when Lizette Parker died in office. He thus filled in as acting mayor for several months until the town council elected Mohammed Hameeduddin on July 1, 2016.
Jacqueline Kates	2002	2006	
Paul Steven Ostrow	1996	2002	
Peter Bower	1994	1995	
John Abraham	1992	1993	American of Indian Malayali descent who arrived in the United States in 1972 after working as a textile engineer in Tanzania. He ran for the statehouse 37th District in 1997 and lost.Joseph, George (January 26, 2015). "22 years ago, before Barack, there was John Abraham". Rediff.com.
Eleanor Kieliszek	July 1990	1992	Kieliszek was re-elected mayor in July 1990 in the aftermath of the Phillip Pannell shooting incident, replacing Frank Hall. This was her second term.
Francis "Frank" Hall	1988	July 1990	This was Hall's second mayoral tenure.
Bernard E. Brooks	July 1, 1982	1988	Bernard Brooks (c. 1935 – October 27, 2007) was elected mayor in July 1982, becoming the first black mayor in Teaneck's history. He served as mayor from 1982 until 1990. Brooks remained Teaneck's only African-American mayor until Lizette Parker's election in 2014.
Francis "Frank" Hall	June 1978	1982	This was their first tenure as mayor.
Eleanor Kieliszek	1974	June 1978	This was her first term. She was the first female Mayor of Teaneck, New Jersey and the first woman elected to the township council. Eleanor Manning Kieliszek (1925 – May 16, 2017) was also an elected member of the Teaneck Township Council for 30 years from 1970 until 2000.
Frank White Burr	1970	1974	Frank White Burr (January 7, 1906 – May 4, 1992) was the Mayor of Teaneck, New Jersey from 1970 to 1974. He was an advocate for the Glenpointe development at the intersection of the New Jersey Turnpike (a portion of Interstate 95) and Interstate 80. Burr was born in Hasbrouck Heights, New Jersey on January 7, 1906. He attended Hasbrouck Heights High School. He graduated New York University and New York University School of Law and spent his entire professional life working for Chase Manhattan Bank. Burr served as a trustee on the Teaneck Board of Education from 1955 to 1961 and was board president from 1956 to 1957. He was a member of the Township's advisory board on Community Relations from 1961 to 1967 and was its chairman when Teaneck became the first town in the nation where a white majority voluntarily voted for school integration. He opposed the 1972 New Jersey $650‐million transportation bond issue because it did not restore the closed West Shore Line railroad. He died on May 4, 1992, in Teaneck, New Jersey.
Thomas Costa	May 24, 1966	1969	Thomas J. Costa (June 30, 1912 – April 1, 2003) was an American Republican Party politician who served two terms in the New Jersey General Assembly, as well serving as the mayor of Teaneck, New Jersey, and as a Bergen County freeholder.
Matthew Feldman	1962	January 1966	Matthew Feldman (March 22, 1919 – April 11, 1994) resigned as mayor upon election to the New Jersey Senate.
August Hanniball, Jr.	June 1958	1962	
Thomas J. E. Brown	1956	June 1958	
Henry Deissler	May 23, 1950	1955	
Clarence William Brett	May 28, 1946	1950	
Milton Gideon Votee	1934	1946	He was born in 1880. He served as mayor for 12 years. He was one of the organizers of the switch to a township manager form of government. In 1958, the township renamed its Central Park the Milton Votee Park. He worked at the Railway Express Agency from 1900 to 1951. He was secretary of the Bergen County Sewer Authority. He died of a heart attack at Holy Name Hospital on August 9, 1961.
Karl D. Van Wagner	1930	1933	Elected as the first mayor under the council-manager form of government on November 11, 1930.
Lacey Walker	1930	1930	He was the last chairman under the township committee form of government. His last election as chairman was on January 1, 1930, and he served until November 11, 1930, when the township re-organized as a council-manager form of government and elected Karl D. Van Wagner as the first mayor.
Christian Gloeckler	1927	1929	
William Harold Bodine, Sr.	1925	1926	This was his third term.
Frederic Andreas	1924	1924	
Frederick J. Griffith	1921	1924	
Maurice Veuve	1918	1920	
William Harold Bodine, Sr.	1917	1917	This was his second term.
Frederick McGuire	1916	1916	
William Harold Bodine, Sr.	1915	1915	This was his first term. He was born on March 15, 1874, in Brooklyn, New York to William Nott Bodine (1846–1896) and Julia Ann Pereigo (1847–1928).
Robert A. Shaw	1912	1914	
James E. Pearce	1910	1911	
William Weaver Bennett	February 19, 1895	1909	William Weaver Bennett (February 4, 1841 – June 13, 1912) was the first Chairman of Teaneck, New Jersey. He was born in Derbyshire, England on February 4, 1841. When six months old, his parents came to America to live in Binghamton, New York, where the father died around 1853. He moved to Teaneck and built a series of row houses and then became the property manager for William Walter Phelps. He was the first chairman of Teaneck, New Jersey, from 1895 to 1909. Bennett died on June 13, 1912, in Teaneck, New Jersey, at the age of 71. He was buried at Brookside Cemetery, Englewood. He served as chairman for 13 years.
