= Aplio =

- Company type: Private
- Industry: Internet appliance
- Headquarters: San Bruno, California

Aplio was an Internet appliance maker located in San Bruno, California. They were a French startup, that was founded in 1996. They were acquired by Net2Phone in 2000.

Their product Aplio/Phone is a device, that allowed a standard telephone to communicate across the Internet. It was named Product of the Year by the Internet Telephony magazine. Version 2.0 was shipped in 1999. Aplio/Pro was an Internet telephony appliance with an embedded Linux kernel. It was named Product of the Year by Internet Telephony and Communications Services magazines.
