= Net2Phone =

American telecommunications company

net2phone
- Type: Subsidiary
- Industry: Business Communications Services
- Founded: 1990; 36 years ago
- Founder: Howard Jonas
- Headquarters: Newark, New Jersey USA
- Number of locations: US, Canada, Mexico, Argentina, Peru, Columbia, Chile, Brazil, Spain, Uruguay, Israel, Costa Rica, Guatemala (2026)
- Area served: Worldwide
- Key people: Jonah Fink - Chief Executive Officer Zali Ritholtz - Chief Operations Officer; Jeffrey Skelton - co-Chief Technology Officer; Arunim Devroy - co-Chief Technology Officer Darin Zaga - Chief Financial Officer
- Products: Unite, AI Agent, Coach Ai, uContact, Huddle
- Revenue: $58.2 million (2022)
- Members: 500,000 (2026)
- Number of employees: 500+ (2026)
- Parent: IDT Corporation
- Website: www.net2phone.com

net2phone is a Cloud Communications provider offering cloud based telephony services to businesses worldwide. The company is a subsidiary of IDT Corporation.

== History ==
net2phone was founded in 1990 by telecom entrepreneur Howard Jonas, the chairman and chief executive officer of net2phone’s parent company, IDT Corporation. The company was an early pioneer in the commercialization of voice-over-Internet protocol (VoIP) technologies leveraging the global carrier business and infrastructure of IDT and focusing on transitioning businesses and consumers from PSTN, traditional telecom interconnects, to Voice over IP.

On July 30, 1999, during the dot-com bubble, the company became a public company via an initial public offering, raising $81 million. Shares rose 77% on the first day of trading to $26 per share. After completion of the IPO, IDT owned 57% of the company. Within a few weeks, the shares increased another 100% in value, to $53 per share.

In March 2000, in a transaction facilitated by IDT CEO Howard Jonas, a consortium of telecommunications companies led by AT&T announced a $1.4 billion investment for a 32% stake in the company, buying shares for $75 each. The transaction was completed in August 2000. AOL had expressed an interest in buying all or part of the company but was not agreeable to the price.

In August 2000, Jonathan Fram, president of the company, left the company to join eVoice.

In September 2000, the company formed Adir Technologies, a joint venture with Cisco Systems to acquire Netspeak Corporation. In March 2002, the company sued Cisco for breach of contract.

In February 2002, the company announced 110 layoffs, or 28% of its workforce.

In October 2004, Liore Alroy became chief executive officer of the company.

On March 13, 2006, IDT Corporation acquired the shares of the company that it did not already own for $2.05 per share.

In 2015, net2phone began providing Unified Communications as a Service (UCaaS) targeted to the SMB market. net2phone’s UCaaS initiative was developed by the Company’s management team led by its President, Jonah Fink.

Over the next 3 years, net2phone continued to expand its UCaaS offering into Argentina, Brazil, Colombia, Mexico, and Peru leveraging its local infrastructure, communication licenses and local staff all while selling in the respective market’s local currency and language sets.

In 2020, with the rise of the COVID-19 pandemic causing a shift in the workplace environment, net2phone launched a native integration into Microsoft Teams, as well as its own video conferencing platform, net2phone Huddle, followed by further integrations into CRM tools such as Salesforce and Zoho and collaboration tools such as Slack.

In 2023, net2phone launches Artificial Intelligence (AI) capabilities into its UCaaS and CCaas platforms, introducing sentiment analysis, call summary, and automated next steps and action items.

In 2025, net2phone launches AI Agent and Coach AI. AI Agent is an intelligent agent that autonomously handles sales support and administrative tasks. Coach AI is an AI-powered automated coaching tool for sales and support teams.

== Acquisitions ==
In 2000, the company acquired Aplio, an internet appliance maker located in San Bruno, California.

In 2001, the company acquired iPing.

As Unified Communications demands more than just voice over IP, such as messaging – in January 2017 net2phone acquired Live Ninja, a Miami based provider of a customer-facing messaging and live chat management service.

In 2018, net2phone launched an updated version of its communications platform, incorporating the technology and capabilities from the Live Ninja acquisition.

Further expansion came in 2019 with the acquisition of Versature, a SaaS-based business communications and hosted VoIP provider serving the Canadian market.

In 2020 with the acquisition of RingSouth Europa, a business communications provider headquartered in Murcia, Spain.

In 2022, net2phone acquired Integra CCS, a Contact Center as a Service (CCaaS) provider operating out of Uruguay.

== Products ==
=== Unite ===
Unite is net2phone's Unified Communications as a Service (UCaaS) product, which provides businesses with voice, video, chat, text, and integrations. The product offers advanced call features, reporting, analytics, and integrations with popular SaaS tools, as well as AI-powered tools including, sentiment analysis, automatic call transcription, auto-generated call summaries and follow-up emails, and AI-generated coaching notes that can be managed through a web-based interface.

=== AI Agent ===
net2phone's AI Agent is a conversational, task-execution virtual agent that autonomously handles customer interactions across voice and webchat, resolving inquiries, executing tasks, and managing routine workflows without human intervention.

=== Coach AI ===
Coach AI is an AI-powered coaching and quality assurance platform for sales and support teams. Coach analyzes 100% of calls and emails to deliver automated, data-driven coaching recommendations, performance insights, and sentiment analysis.

=== uContact ===
uContact is a Contact Center as a Service (CCaaS) platform introduced through their acquisition of Integra in 2022. uContact features a suite of contact center features, including omnichannel support, social media, chatbots, workflow management, and development tools.

=== Huddle ===
Huddle is a net2phone’s high-definition video conferencing platform released in April 2020. Huddle conferences are passcode-protected and encrypted. Huddle includes several features including screen sharing, YouTube casting, chat messaging, and a raise hand option. The application is accessible from desktop or mobile device.

=== net2phone AI ===
net2phone AI was released in July 2023 as an add-on service designed to optimize agent and client interactions. Key functionalities include sentiment analysis, automatic call transcription, auto-generated follow-up emails, auto-generated call summaries, AI-generated coaching notes, call analytics, and CRM integrations. net2phone AI is available in multiple languages and integrates with communication or voice platforms that support API webhooks. The features and functionalities have now been built into the products.

=== SIP Trunking ===
net2phone offers SIP Trunking services, allowing businesses to merge voice and data into a unified communications platform without the need for equipment replacement. The SIP trunking solution includes features such as high-quality voice interactions, international calling, hybrid SIP and hosted support, increased security, codec support, and a stable, fully redundant network.
