= Netspeak =

American telecommunications software company

NetSpeak Corporation
- Company type: Public
- Traded as: Nasdaq: NSPK
- Industry: Telecommunications software
- Founded: 1995
- Fate: Acquired
- Successor: ADIR VoIP Technologies
- Headquarters: Boca Raton, Florida, United States
- Key people: Mike Rich(CEO); John Staten(CFO); Brad Noe; Keith Kelly (technical executive and inventor); Chris Dinallo; Mark Pietras; Ron Hume; Michael Kelly
- Products: WebPhone
- Website: Archived official website

NetSpeak Corporation (NASDAQ:NSPK) was an American telecommunications software company and early commercial developer of Voice over Internet Protocol (VoIP) software during the emergence of Internet telephony in the 1990s. The company, headquartered in Boca Raton, Florida, traded on the Nasdaq stock exchange under the symbol NSPK.

NetSpeak was known for its WebPhone software, an Internet telephony application supporting voice communications over TCP/IP networks. The company was among the first generation of firms commercializing packet-based voice communications over the public Internet alongside companies such as VocalTec, Vonage, and Net2Phone.

== History ==
NetSpeak emerged during the early commercialization of Internet telephony in the mid-1990s, when telecommunications and networking companies began developing technologies for transmitting voice traffic over packet-switched IP networks rather than traditional circuit-switched telephone systems.

The company developed software products intended to integrate voice communications with Internet and enterprise networking infrastructure.

In 1997, Computer Business Review reported that NetSpeak had entered into a strategic alliance with ACT Networks to jointly develop Internet Protocol telephony products and applications.

In January 1998, Bay Networks announced a $37 million investment in NetSpeak for approximately a 9 percent ownership stake. Wired reported that Bay Networks intended to incorporate NetSpeak's VoIP technology into networking equipment including routers and remote-access products.

In March 1998, Motorola announced a strategic relationship with NetSpeak involving Voice over IP technologies for wireless and telecommunications networks. Wired reported that Motorola planned to increase its ownership position in NetSpeak through a tender offer for additional shares. Computing reported that Motorola also committed to a multi-year purchase agreement for NetSpeak technology.

During the late 1990s dot-com era, NetSpeak participated in the broader expansion of Internet telephony and multimedia communications technologies as broadband connectivity and packet networking became increasingly commercially viable.

In June 2001, ADIR VoIP Technologies announced that it had entered into a definitive agreement to acquire NetSpeak Corporation. The announcement described the transaction as combining two VoIP software companies focused on network management, call-control and Voice over IP applications.

== Products ==
=== WebPhone ===
NetSpeak's best-known product was WebPhone, an Internet telephony software application for Microsoft Windows systems.

The software supported:

- duplex voice communications
- voicemail
- conferencing
- text chat
- caller identification
- video communications
- firewall proxy support

according to product documentation and trade press descriptions from the late 1990s.

Computer Business Review described WebPhone 2.0 in 1996 as functioning similarly to an Internet-based private branch exchange (PBX).

== VoIP industry context ==
NetSpeak operated during the early standardization period of Internet multimedia communications protocols including H.323, one of the first widely adopted protocol families for Voice over IP and multimedia conferencing over packet networks.

Early Internet telephony systems often faced technical limitations including:

- latency
- packet loss
- limited broadband deployment
- interoperability challenges
- firewall traversal issues

Despite these limitations, companies such as NetSpeak contributed to the broader transition from circuit-switched telephone systems toward packet-based communications networks and later VoIP and unified communications platforms.

=== Multimedia PC ecosystem ===
NetSpeak's WebPhone software emerged during the expansion of multimedia personal computers in the 1990s, when consumer sound hardware and Windows multimedia software became increasingly capable of supporting real-time digital audio communications.

Internet Archive copies of Creative Labs Sound Blaster software distributions from the mid-1990s include bundled Internet communications applications such as Creative WebPhone alongside multimedia and Internet software including RealAudio and Microsoft Internet Explorer.

The widespread adoption of Sound Blaster-compatible audio hardware during the 1990s helped establish a consumer PC platform capable of supporting early Internet telephony and multimedia communications applications.

== Transition toward carrier-grade VoIP ==
NetSpeak operated during the first commercial generation of Internet telephony before large-scale enterprise and carrier adoption of Voice over IP technologies.

During the late 1990s and early 2000s, networking vendors including Cisco Systems expanded from experimental Internet telephony toward carrier-grade and enterprise IP communications systems integrating voice, video, and data services over converged packet networks.

The industry gradually evolved from proprietary desktop Internet telephony applications such as WebPhone toward enterprise call-control systems, SIP-based communications platforms, IP PBXs, and integrated unified communications architectures.

=== SIP transition ===
NetSpeak's early Internet telephony products emerged during a period when H.323-based multimedia communications systems were widely used for packet-based voice and video applications.

By the late 1990s and early 2000s, the telecommunications industry increasingly shifted toward Session Initiation Protocol (SIP)-based architectures for Voice over IP services. Companies including Vovida Networks developed SIP-related software and protocol technologies before Vovida was acquired by Cisco Systems in 2000.

The transition from proprietary and H.323-based Internet telephony systems toward SIP contributed to the later development of interoperable enterprise VoIP, unified communications, and cloud telephony platforms.

=== Cable industry VoIP ===
During the late 1990s, cable operators and CableLabs began developing PacketCable specifications for delivering Voice over IP and multimedia services over DOCSIS broadband cable networks.

CableLabs introduced PacketCable specifications in 1999 as part of broader efforts to support real-time multimedia and telephony services over broadband cable infrastructure.

The emergence of PacketCable and carrier-managed VoIP architectures represented a transition from early desktop Internet telephony applications toward large-scale managed broadband voice services delivered by cable and telecommunications operators.

== Legacy ==
NetSpeak was part of the first generation of companies commercializing Internet telephony technologies before widespread broadband Internet deployment and the later adoption of SIP-based communications systems.

The broader VoIP industry later evolved from proprietary desktop Internet telephony applications toward carrier-grade IP communications, Session Initiation Protocol (SIP), unified communications systems, cloud telephony, and real-time multimedia services.

== See also ==
- Voice over IP
- H.323
- Session Initiation Protocol
- VocalTec
- Net2Phone
- Unified communications
