= William Weaver Bennett =

American politician

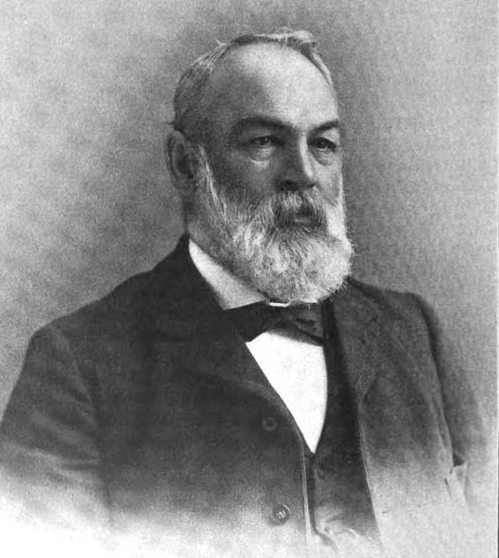
- Bennett circa 1900
- Born: February 4, 1841; Derbyshire, England
- Died: June 13, 1912 (aged 71); Teaneck, New Jersey, United States
- Occupation: Politician

William Weaver Bennett (February 4, 1841 – June 13, 1912) chaired the three-man township committee at the formation of Teaneck, New Jersey, making him the first Mayor of Teaneck, New Jersey.

== Biography ==
Bennett was born in Derbyshire, England, on February 4, 1841. When six months old, his parents came to America to live in Binghamton, New York, where the father died around 1853.

At the age of 17, he met John Stewart Wells, of Binghamton, New York, and he became an apprentice carpenter. He stayed with him three years.

After working for a time at his trade at home, he enlisted as a mechanic, in the American Civil War, in 1862, and stayed with the army in one capacity or another, with the construction and repair work on railways, going to Alexandria, Virginia, then to Norfolk and Suffolk, Virginia. In 1863, he was assigned to the quarter-master's department and then was employed in the construction of barracks and prison houses, and in the manufacture of army furniture. After the Siege of Petersburg and the capture of Richmond, Virginia, he applied for his discharge papers.

He moved to Teaneck and built a series of row houses and then became the property manager for William Walter Phelps. He was the first Mayor of Teaneck, New Jersey, from 1895 to 1909.

Bennett died on June 13, 1912, in Teaneck, New Jersey, at the age of 71. He was buried at Brookside Cemetery, Englewood.
