= IDT Megabite Cafe =

- Interactive map of IDT Megabite Cafe

Restaurant information
- Established: 1996
- Closed: 1998
- Owner: IDT Corporation
- Food type: Sushi, Cafe
- Dress code: Neat casual
- Location: 19 West 45th Street, New York City, New York, United States of America
- Coordinates: 40.75609°N 73.98027°W
- Seating capacity: 50
- Other information: cybercafe

IDT Megabite Cafe (also known as IDT Mega Bite Cafe) was a cybercafe and sushi bar in New York City.

== History ==
IDT Megabite Cafe is located in New York City's Diamond District. Originally the internet café was a kosher cafe and pizza restaurant. In February 1997, the cafe restaurant was converted into a cybercafe, incorporating a new interior and a kosher sushi bar at a cost of what was about $135,000 at the time.

When the cafe reopened in 1997, it had one computer per dining table, plus two that were exclusively for checking email. In total, there were about a dozen public-use computers.

A spokesperson from the IDT Corporation, Howard Jonas, said a wider range of patrons came to the cafe because of the addition. Orthodox Jews, who worked in the Diamond District of New York city, had been the traditional customers, but now that it was a cybercafe, it began to serve a more diverse crowd. To accommodate the new clientele, the Megabite Cafe stayed open two extra hours every night, except Fridays. On Fridays, the cafe closed one hour before the sun went down and did not reopen until Sunday in observance of the Jewish Sabbath.

IDT Megabite Cafe was founded by 31-year old Gaddy Haymov who worked the cash register during active lunch times. He was from Israel and partnered with IDT Corporation to establish a kosher cafe and restaurant. Initially, a rabbi was the inspector to make sure the food on the menu coincided with both the Jewish traditions and the Jewish dietary laws. The café became popular for Orthodox weddings, bar mitzvahs, and other Jewish ceremonial events. There was a separate sushi rabbi who made sure the sushi did not contain shellfish or crustaceans.

The cybercafe's computers had to follow certain Jewish traditions, as did the cafe's menu. The Jewish ideal is a clean body and a clean mind. When the café was full at lunch time, patrons could look at a large poster behind the computers giving them a list of approved items to surf when they got access to a computer. This list included web addresses for the Union of Orthodox Jewish Congregations of America and Project Genesis, an educational program for those who follow the Jewish faith.

== See also ==
- List of restaurants in New York City
