= Killing of Phillip Pannell =

On April 10, 1990, Phillip C. Pannell, an African-American teenager, was shot and killed by Gary Spath, a white police officer in Teaneck, New Jersey. Pannell, who police suspected of possessing a pistol, was running from police when he was shot in the back with his hands raised. Spath was later charged and acquitted of manslaughter. The case created controversy over allegations of racial profiling and police brutality.

== Incident ==
=== Background ===
On April 10, 1990, a group of black teenagers, including 16-year-old Phillip Pannell, were playing in Tryon Park in Teaneck, NJ. The teenagers reported that a pair of them were having a 'play fight' when, in what they described as "routine harassment," a police car drove onto the basketball court where they had been playing and the officer asked if there was a problem. With the police car still stopped on the court, Pannell and the teenagers left the park and began to disperse.

=== Shooting ===
Around 6:15 on April 10, the Teaneck Police Department responded to a call from a resident complaining about a teenager wearing sweatpants and a red down coat pointing a silver-colored gun at another teen holding a rock. Near Bryant Elementary School, Teaneck Police Officers Wayne Blanco and Gary Spath encountered a group of four or five teenagers who had left Tyron park and ordered them to line up against a brick wall. According to one of the teenagers in the group, Pannell and another youth had been "messing around" with an old BB gun after leaving the park; pointing it at him before passing it to another friend. The group reported that the officers approached Pannell, who they agreed was wearing a red down jacket and sweatpants. Officer Blanco claimed to have performed a frisk of Pannell, feeling something heavy in his pocket that he believed to be a gun. According to several of the teenagers, however, the officers never actually touched any of them before Pannell began to run.

At that point, Pannell broke from the line up and ran off with both of the officers pursuing. A witness saw Officer Spath, who is white, fire a first shot as Pannell jumped a hedge and began to climb a backyard fence, closely followed by a second shot. The witness said that she yelled "don't shoot" at Officer Spath between the first and second shots. The officers claimed that as Pannell was about to climb the fence, he had paused and reached into his left pocket, turning slightly toward Spath. Witness disputed that, saying either that Pannell had been turning to surrender, or that he had been climbing the fence when he was shot. After Pannell was shot, the officers recovered a loaded silver .22 caliber pistol from his left jacket pocket. Witnesses at the scene, reported that Officer Blanco became angry, throwing his radio and yelling at Officer Spath that he had "got them in trouble."

An ambulance took Pannell to Holy Name Hospital where he was pronounced dead on arrival due to a single gunshot wound to the upper body.

== Investigation ==
=== Initial investigation ===
The night of the shooting Teaneck Mayor Frank Hall said he wanted to be "sure of a thorough and fair investigation," and that independent investigations would be conducted by the Township Council, Bergen County Prosecutor's Office, and the National Association for the Advancement of Colored People (NAACP). John Holl, the Bergen County Prosecutor, impaneled a grand jury to investigate the shooting. The initial autopsy was performed by the Bergen County Medical Examiner, Dr. Lawrence Denson. By the request of Pannell's family, a second autopsy was performed by Dr. Howard Adelman. The initial autopsy found that Pannell had been shot once in the back with his hands down, possibly corroborating the story of the two officers on the scene that he was reaching for the gun. Dr. Adelman, however, had concluded that Pannell's hands may have been raised when he was shot.

On April 17, seven days after the shooting, New Jersey Attorney General Robert Del Tufo transferred the case to a state grand jury citing the "volatile and polarized" local atmosphere and the "sharp differences" between the testimonies of the police and other witnesses. This referred to the police claim that Pannell had turned and reached for his weapon when he was cornered at the fence, and the eyewitness claims that he had either been climbing the fence, or turning to surrender with his hands raised, when he was shot. The grand jury heard testimony from the police officers, other witnesses, and medical experts. On July 31, 1990 the grand jury decided not to indict Spath. The same day, Attorney General Del Tufo declared that he would give the case to a second panel, saying that the first jury had been contaminated by "errors of major significance" in Dr. Denson's autopsy.

=== New evidence and trial ===
The primary reasoning behind the convening of the second grand jury was faulty evidence that had tainted the first panel, especially revelations about mistakes made in the initial autopsy of Pannell. During the first grand jury's investigation, it emerged that the medical examiner's conclusion that Pannell's hands had been down had been based on an error he made during his autopsy where he had measured the distance from the hole in Pannell's jacket to the entrance wound from the wrong place. This gave him the false impression that the jacket had not been raised when Pannell was shot. Dr. Denson acknowledged his mistake and a review of the autopsy by other medical experts concluded that Pannell had at least had his shoulder or upper arm raised at the time he was shot. On November 28 of 1990, after viewing the revised autopsy, the second state grand jury indicted Spath on the charge of reckless manslaughter.

Spath's trial began in January of 1992 and lasted around a month. The prosecutors charged that Spath had been criminally negligent in his decision to shoot Pannell, which constituted police brutality. They did not claim or introduce any evidence, however, that Spath was a racist or that race had played a role in his decision.

During the trial the jury heard the testimony of eyewitness who claimed to have witnessed Pannell's hands in various raised positions when he was shot, as well as expert testimony from the former Chief Medical Examiner of New York City, who concluded that Pannell's upper left arm (the side on which the police claimed to find the gun) had been raised at least above parallel to the ground based on the positioning of the bullet hole and the lack of certain tissue damage. The jury also heard testimony from Spath and Officer Blanco who insisted that Pannell had reached into his pocket when turning to face them.

Controversy was sparked through the trial by claims from the prosecutors that the Bergen County Sheriff's Office, who are typically charged with protecting the county court house, were attempting to undermine the prosecution. The claim centered around several incidents, one of which involved the arrest of a prosecution witness by the Sheriff's Office just after he testified. The Attorney General's office complained that they were not informed that one of their witnesses would be arrested and described the arrest as an attempt to intimidate witnesses. The tension culminated in February when Steven McDonald, an NYPD Officer paralyzed in a police shooting, was wheeled in to the courtroom without being stopped by the Sheriff's Deputies. After this Judge Charles DiGisi, who was presiding over the case, ordered that responsibility for security in the court be transferred to state troopers.

On February 12, the jury returned a verdict of "not guilty," acquitting Spath on the charge. The announcement of the verdict in the courtroom was followed by cheers from Spath's supporters and crying from the family of Phillip Pannell. The next day friends and supporters of Pannell called for Federal civil rights charges against Spath, though no evidence of racism had been introduced in the trial. No federal charges were ever filed.

== Aftermath ==
Three days after the shooting, Spath was suspended with pay from the Teaneck Police Department. Despite being acquitted, Spath did not resume work at the Teaneck Police and retired from law enforcement. Due to the mistakes made by Dr. Denson during his autopsy of Pannell, Attorney General Del Tufo transferred all autopsies in Bergen County to State Medical Examiner Dr. Robert Goode.

The shooting and surrounding events inspired the 1995 book Color Lines: The Troubled Dreams of Racial Harmony in an American Town by Teaneck resident Mike Kelly.

=== Protests and riots ===
The night after the shooting (April 11), a peaceful protest of several hundred marched in Teaneck asking for the suspension of Gary Spath from the Teaneck Police and for Governor Jim Florio to appoint a special prosecutor to investigate the shooting. The march ended at the Municipal Building with a prayer vigil that was meant to lead to discussion groups in places of worship. During the vigil, however, some teenagers broke off and began shouting and throwing rocks at the police station. Officers in riot gear confronted the youths, and violence ensued. Larger groups of young men began smashing windows at the police station, on patrol cars, and at the Public Library. Eight cars were heavily damaged including two police cars that were flipped over. Some protesters at the prayer vigil attempted to appeal for calm but were unsuccessful. When more police officers in riot gear responded, reportedly trampling some protesters, the rioters fled down Teaneck Road, smashing windows on at least 16 businesses and looting some of the stores. Some reporters were caught in the violence, being dragged or beaten by rioters. At least four people were injured, one of whom was taken by ambulance to the hospital. The Teaneck Police called in reinforcements from neighboring towns, the Bergen County Police, and the New Jersey state troopers. By around 10 p.m., there was relative calm in the town center. The police reported four arrests that night, but largely did not detain or engage those who were rioting.

The community was divided by the killing of Phillip Pannell. Protest marches with many African Americans believing that Pannell had been killed in cold blood, while there were white residents insisting that Spath may have been justified in his actions. Spath was ultimately acquitted on charges of reckless manslaughter in the shooting. Some months after Spath had been cleared, he decided to retire from law enforcement. The incident was an international news event that brought Reverend Al Sharpton and Jesse Jackson to the community, and calls for Federal Civil Rights prosecution.

== In the media ==
In 2022, MSNBC produced a four-part series called Model America detailing the events that lead up to Pannell's shooting and the intense calls for justice that followed in its aftermath. Rev. Al Sharpton authored a promotional article for the series. Democracy Now! also aired its own two-part series on the shooting of Phillip Pannell.

Backlash, a local hardcore band from Teaneck, New Jersey released a track titled "Teachings" of which was inspired by the shooting of Pannell. The song is featured on a digital compilation album "Through Different Eyes" released April 26, 2006 by Conquer The World Records. On June 12 2010, 1124 Records reissued a Limited (500 copies) Vinyl LP pressing of the album.
