= Mohammed Hameeduddin =

American former politician (born c. 1973)

Mayor of Teaneck, New Jersey
- In office July 1, 2016 – July 1, 2020
- Preceded by: Elie Katz
- Succeeded by: Jim Dunleavy
- In office July 1, 2010 – July 1, 2014
- Preceded by: Kevie Feit
- Succeeded by: Lizette Parker

Personal details
- Born: 1973 (age 52–53) The Bronx, New York
- Spouse: Faiza Poshni

Mohammed Hameeduddin (born c. 1973) is an American former politician and the Mayor of Teaneck, New Jersey. He was elected on July 1, 2010, in a 5–2 vote by the non-partisan township council. The son of immigrants from Hyderabad, India, Hameeduddin is the first Muslim-American to be elected mayor in Bergen County, and one of a few Muslims to hold the office of mayor in the United States.

On July 1, 2016, Hameeduddin was again elected Mayor of Teaneck by the town council following the death of Mayor Lizette Parker in April. His term of service ended July 1, 2020.

== Biography ==
=== Early life and education ===
Hameeduddin was born to an Indian Muslim family from Hyderabad in The Bronx, New York City. He moved to Teaneck, New Jersey, in 1981 with his family. He attended Emerson Elementary School and Benjamin Franklin Middle School in the Teaneck Public Schools before graduating from Teaneck High School. He then attended Rutgers University for two-and-a-half years.

He owns and operates the HW Title Agency in nearby Hackensack, New Jersey.

=== Political career ===
The township's deputy mayor, Adam Gussen, an Orthodox Jew, had attended primary school, Teaneck High School and Rutgers University with Hameeduddin. Hameeduddin told the New Jersey Jewish News the pair first met in middle school, in grade six, when they were both sent to their school's principal's office for different infractions.

His election sparked media attention to the diversity of Teaneck's population.

Hameeduddin became Teaneck's first Muslim councilmember when he was elected to a four-year term on the Township Council in 2008. On May 8, 2012, Hameeduddin was re-elected as Mayor of Teaneck with 4,374 votes.

Scholars and journalists have chosen to quote and comment on Hameeduddin's term as mayor.

During the summer of 2010, the conversion of a building in Manhattan to a mosque triggered controversy for some Americans as it was less than a mile from the site where the World Trade Center towers had been attacked by hijacked airplanes piloted by Islamic extremists on September 11, 2001. On August 16, 2010, Gwen Ifill of the PBS Newshour tried to moderate a discussion between Hameeduddin and Rick Lazio, a former member of the US Congress and candidate for Governor of New York, over the "Ground Zero Mosque". The discussion grew heated, and Ifill later apologized for the "unplanned aberration."

Australian scholars, comparing how American television and Australian television marked the tenth anniversary of al Qaeda's attack of 9–11, chose to quote Hameeduddin. Hameeduddin's comment was originally broadcast on the Seven Network as a response to anti-Muslim retaliations:

We're Muslim Americans, we're neighbors, we're politicians, we're doctors, we're lawyers. You know we're teachers. We're part of the American fabric. And to single us out and to put out these bills that are unconstitutional, saying you can't practise your religion, and anti-sharia bills and things like that—these Pavlovian triggers that the Islamophobes are very good at putting out there. That's something that our community really, ... I'd say we are hurt by.

Tina Susman, reporting in the Los Angeles Times also chose to quote Hameeduddin in its coverage of the Ground Zero Mosque controversy. She noted how he described how some politicians focused on Muslims, when "looking for a wedge issue." She also noted the high regard his Jewish colleagues apparently felt for him, quoting Elie Katz, who joked Hameeduddin encouraged him to be a better Jew, when he knew Katz was missing attending synagogue.

Hameeduddin was included in a list of prominent Muslim office-holders in "Sons of Abraham: A Candid Conversation about the Issues That Divide and Unite Jews and Muslims". The other six individuals offered as examples were Congressional Representatives or Presidential appointees.

In "Uncle Swamy" Vijay Prashad described the struggles individuals of South Asian ethnic heritage have engaged in to be accepted more fully into the mainstream of American life. He praised Teaneck city council for passing a "far-sighted anti-bias resolution" under Hameeduddin's leadership.

In December 2011 CBS News quoted Hameeduddin in a report about a general problem in New Jersey. Hameeduddin told Levon Putney that in 2008 five deputy fire chiefs retired, telling the city they were each owed a substantial payout for unused sick-pay. He said that the officials had been trusted to keep track of their own sick-pay. Teaneck closed this loophole for its own officials. In 2011 New Jersey Governor Chris Christie called for an end to local officials keeping track of their own sick pay.

In March 2013 Hameedudin was chosen to appear in a panel at the Wilson Center, entitled "American Muslim Local Officials: Challenges and Opportunities".

Hameeduddin participated as one of three Muslim celebrity judges during the "Crescent Foods Cooking Challenge" at the "Sameer's Eats Halal Food Tour" in July 2013. Four cooking teams were challenged to prepare a halal meal with mystery ingredients.

=== Second tenure as mayor (2016–2020) ===
Incumbent Mayor Lizette Parker unexpectedly died in office on April 24, 2016. Deputy Mayor Elie Katz assumed the role of acting mayor until Parker's permanent successor could be elected by the town council.

On July 1, 2016, the Teaneck town council elected Mohammed Hameeduddin as the new mayor of Teaneck, marking his second tenure as head of the township. He was sworn into office by Jersey City Mayor Steve Fulop later that same day. His term ended July 1, 2020 as he opted to not run for re-election to the council.
