= IDT Corporation =

American telecom company

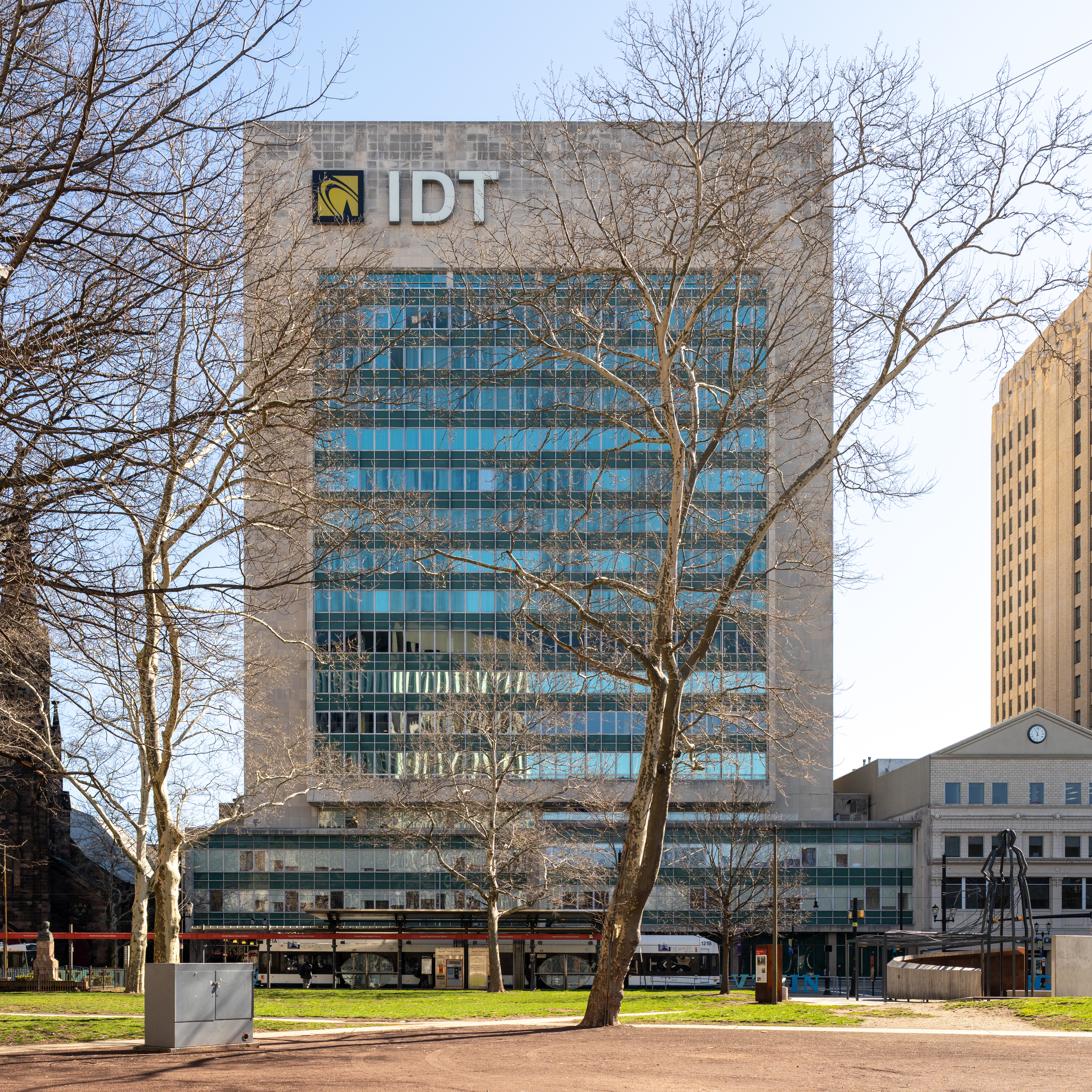
- Headquarters at 520 Broad Street in Newark
- Type: Public
- Traded as: NYSE: IDT; Russell Microcap component
- Founded: August 1990; 36 years ago
- Founder: Howard Jonas
- Headquarters: Newark, New Jersey, U.S.
- Key people: Howard Jonas (chairman); Samuel Jonas (CEO); Bill Pereira (COO); David Wartell (CTO)
- Products: Cloud communications; unified communications; point of sale
- Services: Financial services; telecommunications
- Revenue: ▼US$1.24 billion (2023)
- Operating income: ▲US$60.7 million (2023)
- Net income: ▲US$40.5 million (2023)
- Total assets: ▲US$511 million (2023)
- Total equity: ▲US$200 million (2023)
- Number of employees: 1,890 (2023)
- Website: idt.net
- Footnotes; Financials as of July 31, 2023.

IDT Corporation (originally standing for International Discount Telecommunications) is a multinational provider of cloud communications, point of sale systems, unified communications, and financial services foreign exchange services for selected clients. It has units dedicated for businesses and consumers such as the Boss Revolution pre-paid phone cards, headquartered in Newark, New Jersey.

== Overview ==
IDT's first service was callback, which was based on the idea that "it costs two and three times as much to call from overseas as it does the other way."

== History ==
IDT was founded by entrepreneur Howard Jonas in August 1990. He founded the company after opening a sales office in Israel, receiving large international phone bills and then discovering a way to lower them by re-originating calls in the United States.

In 1996, IDT founded Net2Phone, the world's fourth-largest VoIP provider (2017), and sold 32% of Net2Phone in August 2000 to AT&T for $1.1 billion in cash. That same year, IDT became a public company via an initial public offering.

=== Acquisitions and spinoffs ===
- November 2004: launched IDT Energy, a retail energy business. It and other energy-related businesses were spun off October 2011. IDT Energy went to its shareholders as Genie Energy.
- January 2006: IDT Telecom, Inc. sold to GVC Networks LLC all its IDT Winstar Solution subsidiaries: Winstar Communications, Winstar Government Solutions, LLC and Winstar Wireless, LLC.
- February 2006: IDT announced it would reacquire full ownership of Net2Phone, a company it had launched in the mid 1990s.
- March 2006: IDT sold its Russian telecom business, Corbina Telecom, to a Moscow-based consortium of private equity investors.
- May 2006: IDT agreed to sell its IDT Entertainment division to Liberty Media.
- August 2006: sale of all of IDT Entertainment's US operations and several international operations was completed.
- December 2006: IDT acquired a controlling interest in the parent company of 2003-founded Zedge.net, a social networking community for mobile users and platform for sharing free mobile content. It was spun off in June 2016.
- 2007: IDT acquired a 53% interest in comic book, graphic novel, art book, and comic strip collection publisher Idea and Design Works (IDW). In 2009, IDT increased its interest to 76%. Shortly afterwards, IDT created CTM Media Holdings, which consisted of the majority interest in IDW and CTM Media Group, a distributor of print and online media advertising focused on tourist destinations. On September 14, 2009, IDT spun off CTM Media Holdings to its shareholders.

IDT operated a wireless MVNO, TúYo Mobile on the T-Mobile network. It was terminated on May 1, 2012. On July 31, 2013, IDT spun off Straight Path, a communications asset company holding 39 GHz (millimeter wave) nationwide spectrum and on average, 800 MHz of bandwidth in top 30 US markets. In October 2014, IDT sold Fabrix Systems, an Israel-based software company that developed and licenses a proprietary cloud based storage and computing platform, to Ericsson.

In February 2015 the company announced it had reached an agreement with Empresa de Telecomunicaciones de Cuba S.A. (ETECSA), Cuba's national telecom provider, for international long-distance telephony between the United States and Cuba directly.

In January 2017, Net2Phone, subsidiary of IDT Corporation, acquired LiveNinja, a Miami-based messaging and live chat technology startup. LiveNinja's messaging technology is being integrated into its new product now in development. Leveraging LiveNinja's technology, net2phone will offer a multi-channel platform for small and medium-sized enterprises that spans phone, messaging, SMS and web chat.

On 24 January 2018, IDT began a pilot test on using Ripple's native cryptocurrency. The aim to simplify cross border payments, in order to free up billions held in foreign Vostro accounts.

In March 2018, IDT completed its spinoff of Rafael Holdings with IDT founder Howard Jonas serving as chairman of the board and chief executive officer Rafael Holdings holds commercial real estate assets and interests in two clinical stage, oncology focused pharmaceutical companies. The pharmaceutical holdings consist of interests in Rafael Pharmaceuticals, Inc. and a majority stake in Lipomedix Pharmaceuticals Ltd., both of which are focused on development and commercialisation of drugs in the oncology space.

On April 20, 2020, during the COVID-19 pandemic, IDT Corporation applied for and received a loan of US$10 million as part of the Paycheck Protection Program. On April 26, 2020, due to criticism of large companies who were accessing the loan program intended to help small businesses, IDT announced that they would return the loan.

== Subsidiaries and services ==
- IDT Telecom, Inc.
  - IDT Europe
  - IDT Telecom Asia Pacific Ltd
  - Net2Phone, Inc.
  - Union Telecard Alliance
  - IDT Financial Services

=== National Retail Solutions ===
In 2015, IDT launched National Retail Solutions (NRS). NRS is a point-of-sale company that is the provider of touch-screen point-of-sale (POS) systems, which offers a customer-facing screen as well as payment and transaction processing services.

=== BOSS Revolution ===
In 2009, IDT introduced BOSS Revolution, a PIN-less international prepaid calling service. BOSS Revolution PIN-less allows smartphone users to make single touch international calls. Since its introduction, BOSS Revolution and other PIN-less providers have largely supplanted the traditional prepaid international calling card industry. IDT subsequently announced initiatives to add various payment services to the BOSS Revolution Platform, including international money transfer.

=== PennyTalk ===
IDT inaugurated a service of low cost international calling called PennyTalk.

== Dial-up Internet access ==
"IDT first offered dial-up services in 1994." They subsequently expanded to offer dedicated Internet access lines. By 1999 this ISP also became "one of the nation's first pre-paid bilingual Internet services."

== See also ==
- IDT Megabite Café
- National Retail Solutions, a subsidiary
