= Teaneck Creek Conservancy =

Eco-art park in Teaneck, Bergen County, New Jersey

Coordinates: 40.874843°N 74.008626°W

- Interactive map of Teaneck Creek Conservancy
- Type: Eco-Art Park (Bergen County, New Jersey)
- Motto: Where Nature, History and Art Come Full Circle
- Location: Teaneck
- Area: 46 acres (19 ha)
- Created: 2001
- Status: Open
- Hiking trails: Red, Blue and Green Trails
- Habitats: Forested Wetland
- Water: Teaneck Creek, Dragonfly Pond
- Parking: Parking lot located at 20 Puffin Way, Teaneck
- Website: www.teaneckcreek.org

The Teaneck Creek Conservancy is a 46-acre (0.19 km^{2}) eco-art park located in Teaneck in Bergen County, New Jersey. It is part of the Bergen County Park system independently managed by the member-supported, non-profit organization, the Teaneck Creek Conservancy. The park contains 1.4 miles (2.3 km) of groomed trails and exhibits both permanent and ephemeral eco-art throughout the year. The conservancy operates art and environmental programs for the local community.

The namesake of the conservancy is Teaneck Creek, which flows through the park and into Overpeck Creek.

== History ==
The Teaneck Conservancy was founded in 2001 by local environmentalists, artists and educators to save a parcel of land from development. Through cooperation of community leaders and the Bergen County Parks Department, Teaneck Creek Park was opened to the public in 2006 containing 1.3 miles of groomed trails, an outdoor classroom, and ecological art exhibits. Since then the conservancy has continued to grow in community membership, sponsors, educational programs for the public and is known as a premier ecological art park in the region. As of October 2022, a 2-year ecological restoration restoring 20 acres of forested wetlands was completed on site. The restored wetland includes a large berm, sand seepage pits, and regenerative stormwater conveyance systems to mitigate storm water discharge off Teaneck Road. The project was funded by Bergen County and Green Acres.

=== History trails ===
This Living Lesson is an online video series with correlating map points throughout the Teaneck Creek Conservancy. The 22-minute tour has both visual and audio features. It is accessible online or by QR code located at TCC. The tour spans centuries of history at the creek and touches on plans for the future. The project was made possible in part though grant funds administered by the Bergen County Division of Cultural and Historic Affairs, Department of Parks, through a General Operating Support Grant from the New Jersey Historical Commission, a division of the Department of State.

== Ecological art ==
The conservancy commissions and hosts ephemeral and permanent eco-art exhibitions throughout the year.

=== Five Pipes Project ===
Of the tons of concrete debris dumped on the park site during the construction of Interstate 95 and I-80, five monolithic concrete drainage pipes marred the natural landscape. They were too large and heavy to remove without considerable destruction to the park and remained as a graffiti covered reminder of the history of environmental degradation.

In 2008, the Teaneck Creek Conservancy commissioned Brooklyn muralist Eduardo Aleander Rabel to lead a group of volunteers including students from the Thomas Jefferson Middle School and AIE NJ State Council on the Arts Grant artist John Kaiser to create murals inside and without all five pipes. The murals of each pipe represent a different era in American history beginning with the Native Americans and ending with the 21st century.

The Five Pipes was completed and opened to the public in October 2009 in a ribbon cutting ceremony.

=== Turtle Peace Labyrinth ===
In 2003, Ariane Burgess of Camino de Paz was commissioned to create an oasis of peace and contemplation in the undisturbed heart of the conservancy. Together with Artist-in-Residence Rick Mills, hundreds of volunteers, families, and community groups turned a site filled with vines and construction debris into the Turtle Peace Labyrinth. Completion of the project ended in 2004.

The labyrinth was constructed from New Jersey construction debris found on-site at the Teaneck Creek Conservancy. The concrete debris were relocated and laid out in a labyrinth design reminiscent of a turtle's back in an homage to the Lenape creation myth.

In 2017, a new fence made by NJ artist David Robinson was built surrounding the labyrinth.

=== The Harmony Garden (decommissioned) ===
The Harmony Garden was created by Erika and Elizabeth Herman, Teaneck residents and students of the Loomis Chaffee School in Windsor, Connecticut. This project was made possible by a Norton Fellowship Grant from Loomis Chaffee. This project used recycled and natural materials to make musical instruments, combining a love of music and a passion for sustainable living. Visitors could scan other QR codes to learn about each instrument, how it was made, what materials were used and how to make the best sound. The installation was decommissioned as its location was within the region containing the habitat restoration project which began in September 2020 and was completed in October 2022.

== Sustainability ==
=== The Jack Flamholz Water Sustainability Project ===
This rainwater harvesting system from Israel, believed to be the first use on the East Coast, was designed by Amir Yachelli. Six rain barrels are located at Teaneck's Hawthorne Elementary School, and two are located at Teaneck Creek Conservancy. In 2018, the conservancy commissioned artist Scott Furman to create water-themed murals installed on the TCC barrels.

=== The New Jersey Sustainable Business Registry ===
In 2018, the Teaneck Creek Conservancy became the first and only Teaneck business registered with the NJSBDC.

== Flora ==
A partial listing of the tree species found at the Teaneck Creek Conservancy.:

- Catalpa speciosa (northern catalpa)
- Acer saccharinum (silver maple)
- Ailanthus altissima (tree of heaven)
- Prunus serotina (black cherry)
- Juglans nigra (black walnut)
- Morus alba (white mulberry)
- Gleditsia triacanthos (honey locust)
- Salix nigra (black willow)
- Robinia pseudoacacia (black locust)

== Fauna ==
A partial listing of the animal life found at the Teaneck Creek Conservancy.:

- Marmota monax (groundhog)
- Mephitis mephitis (striped skunk)
- Odocoileus virginianus (white-tailed deer)
- Procyon lotor (North American raccoon)
- Sylvilagus floridanus (eastern cottontail rabbit)

Bird Species List Download

== Gallery ==
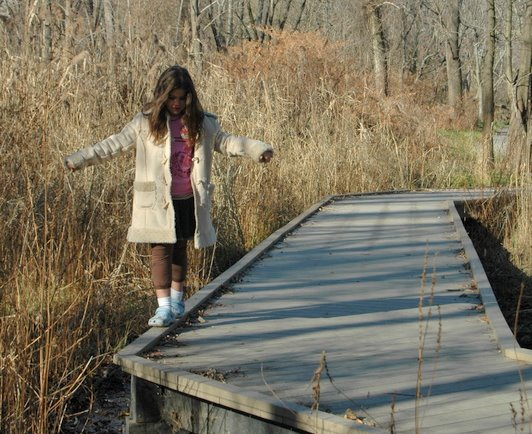
Child on trail bridge in December 2006

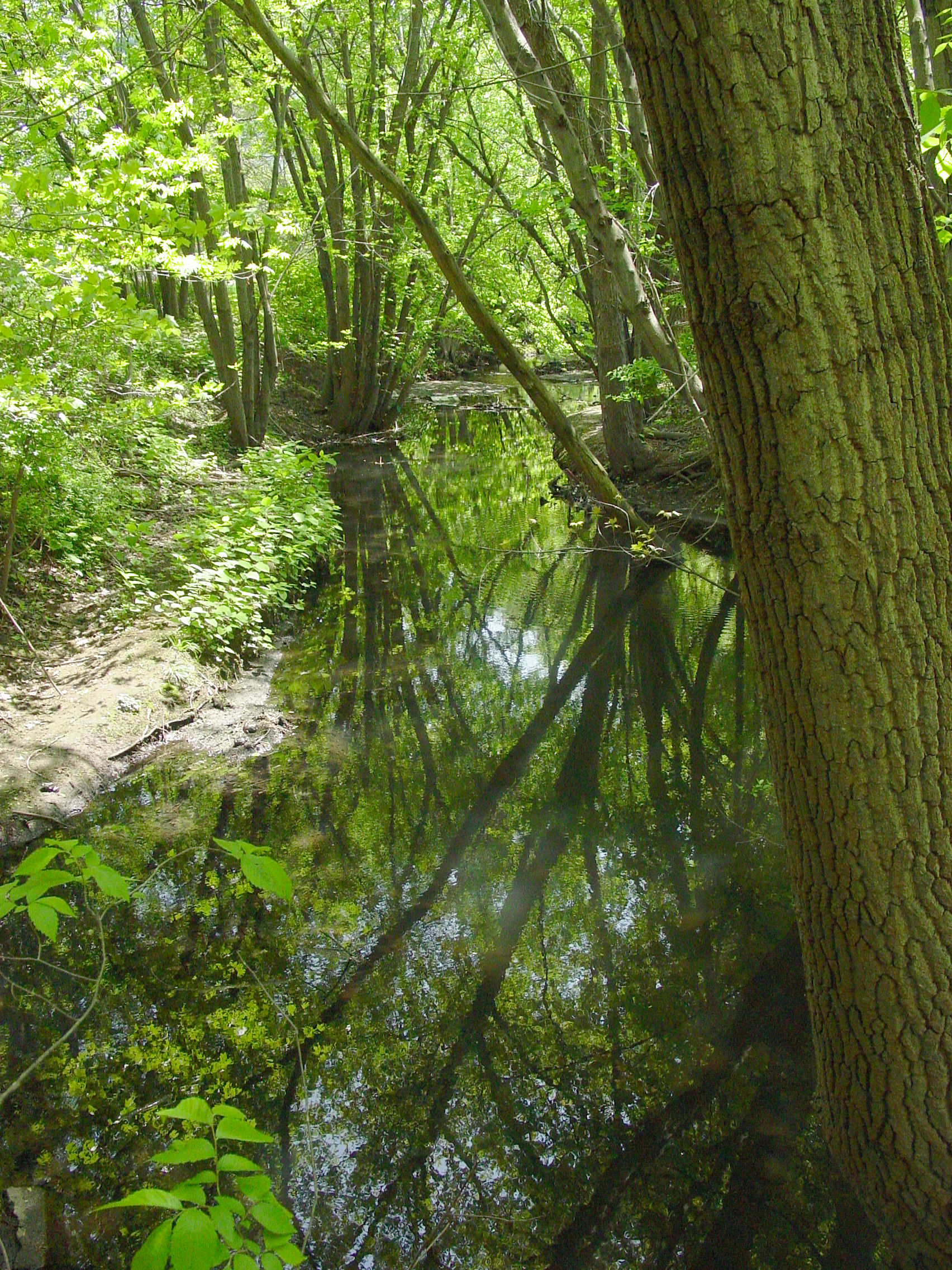
Teaneck Creek in 2005

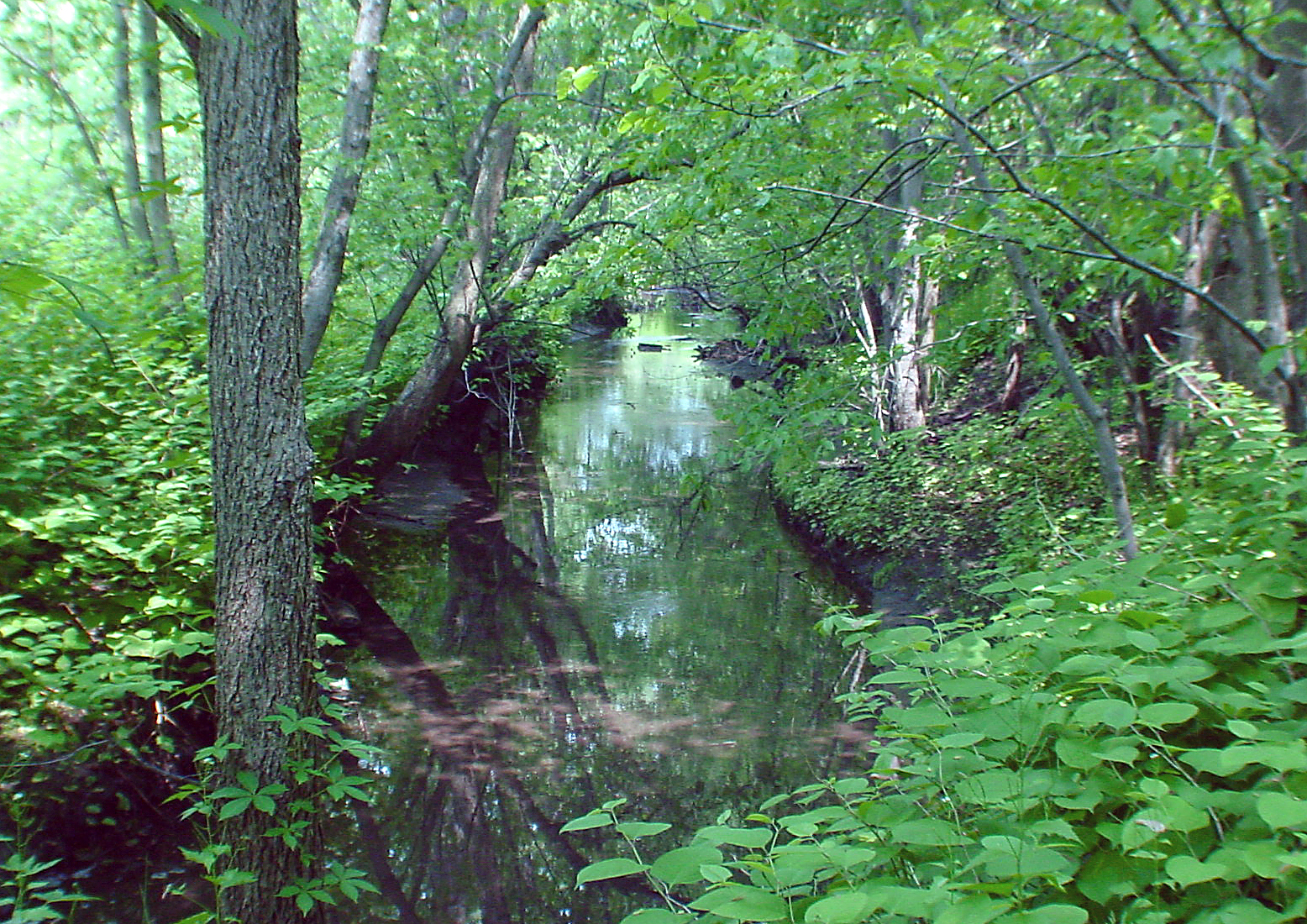
Teaneck Creek in 2005

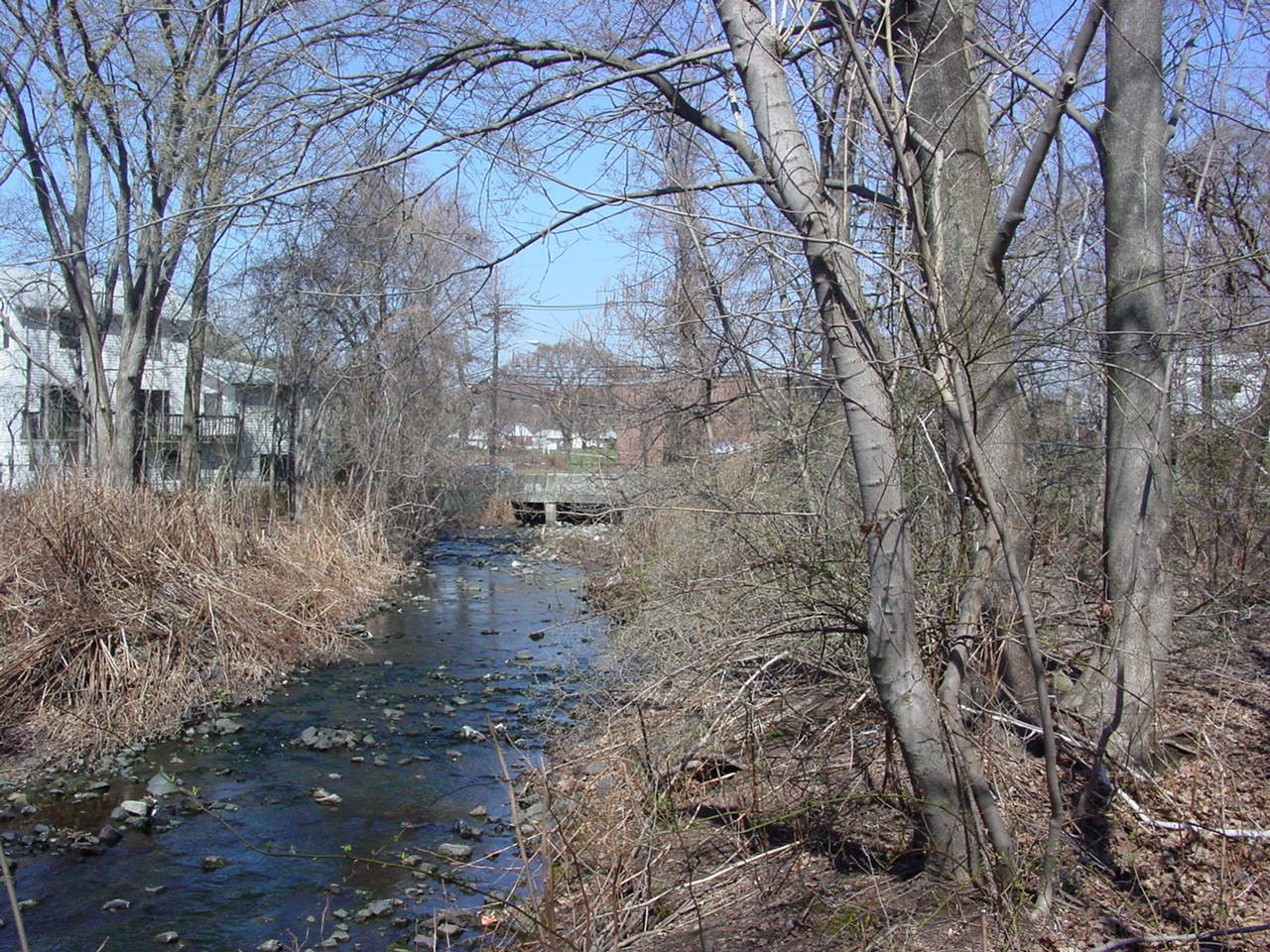
Teaneck Creek in spring 2003

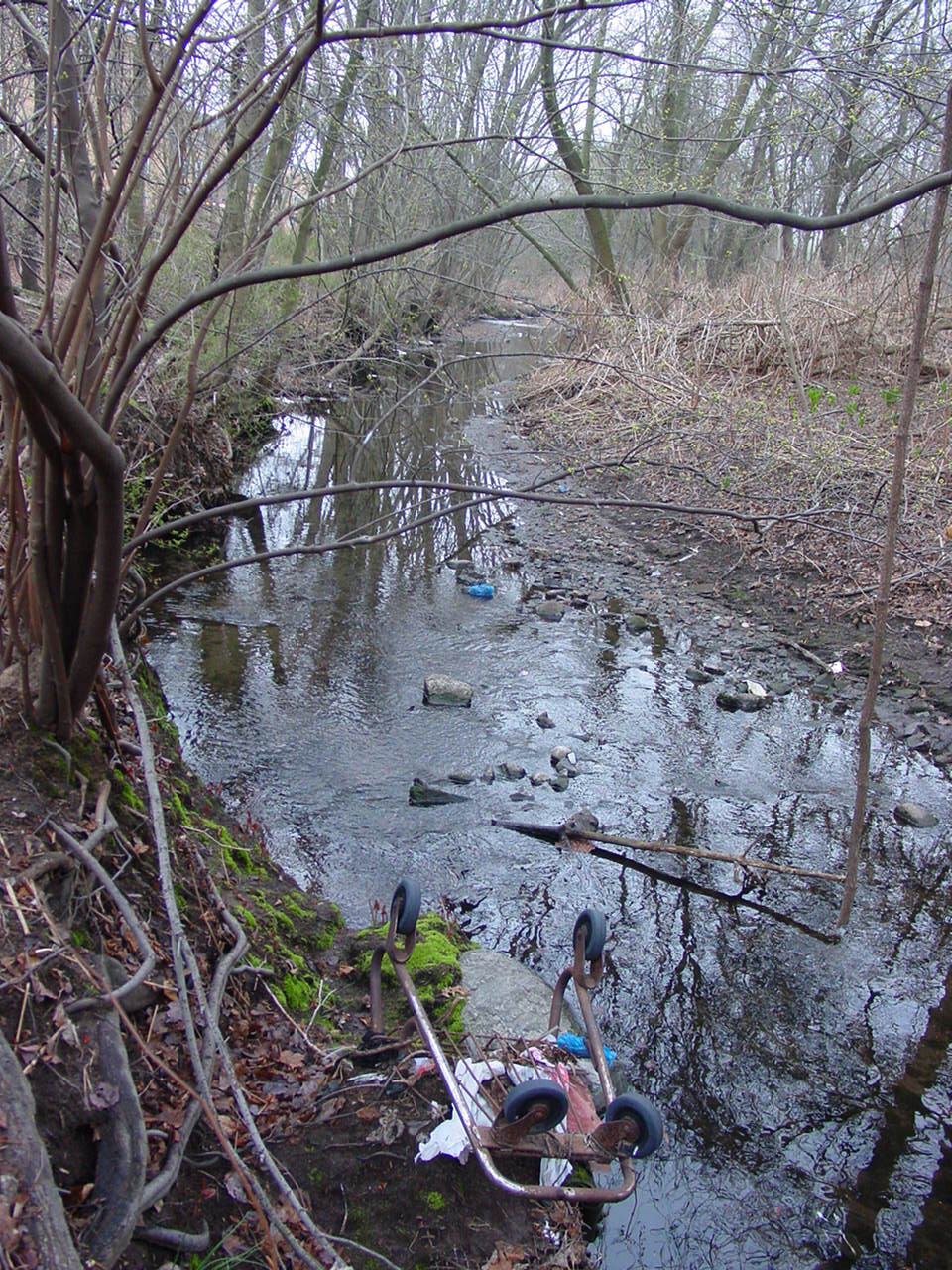
Teaneck Creek in December 2003 littered with debris before cleanup

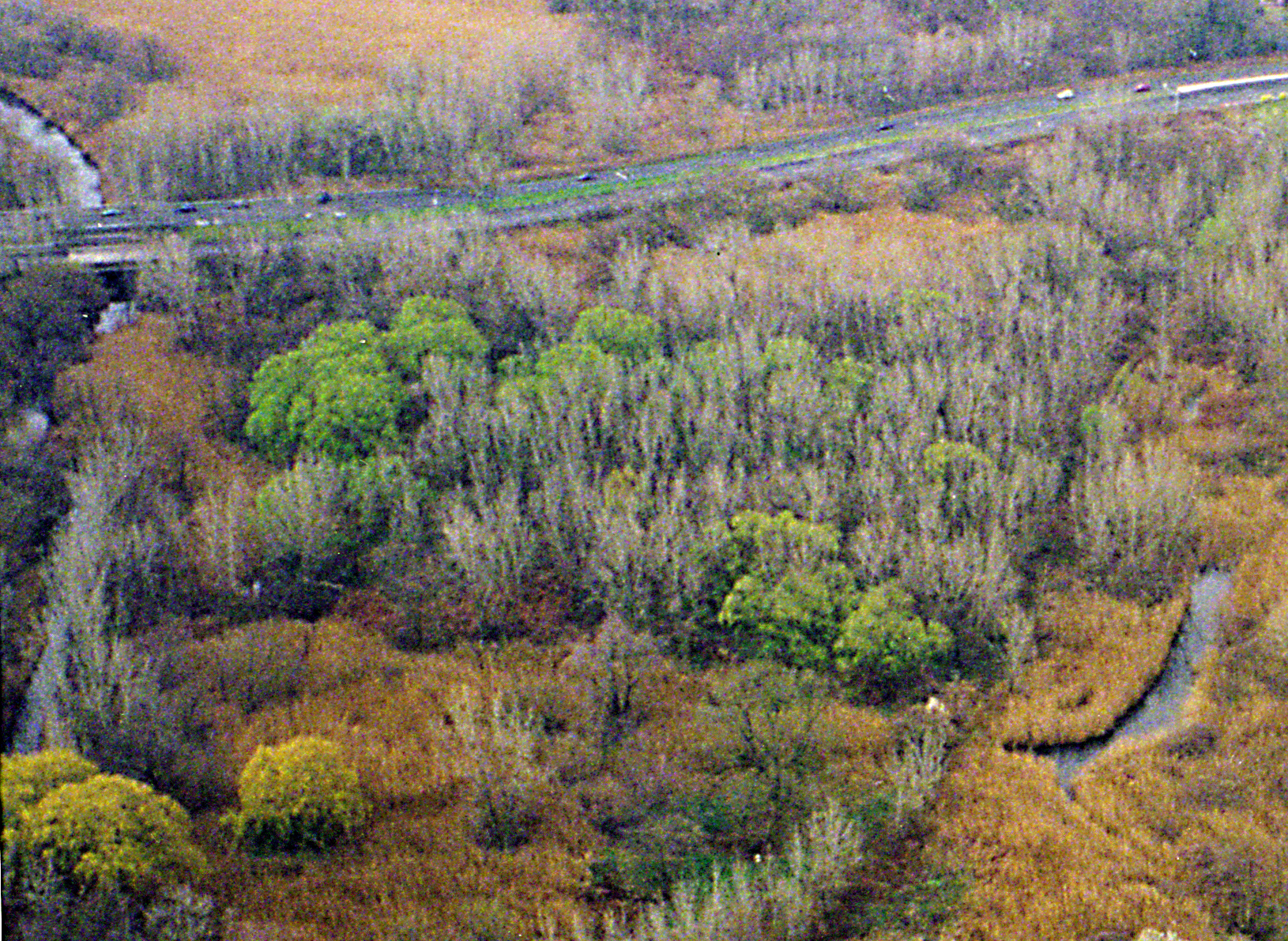
Aerial view of the park lands in 2005

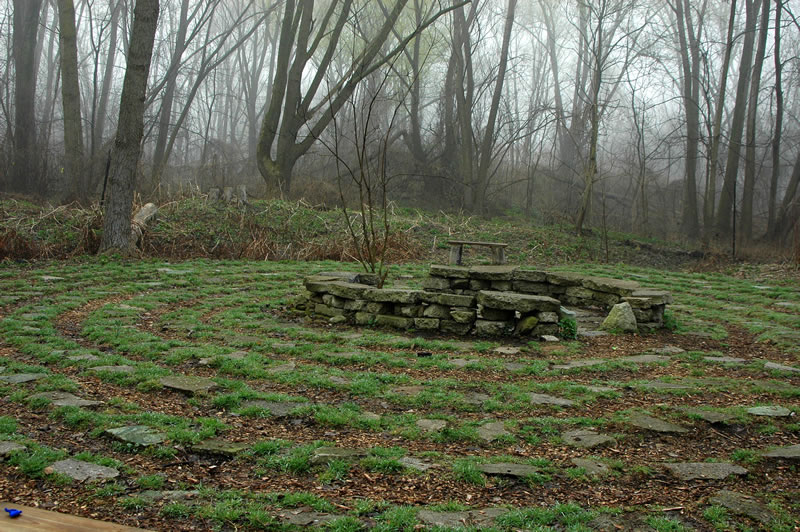
The Turtle Peace Labyrinth at the Teaneck Creek Conservancy, Ariane Burgess

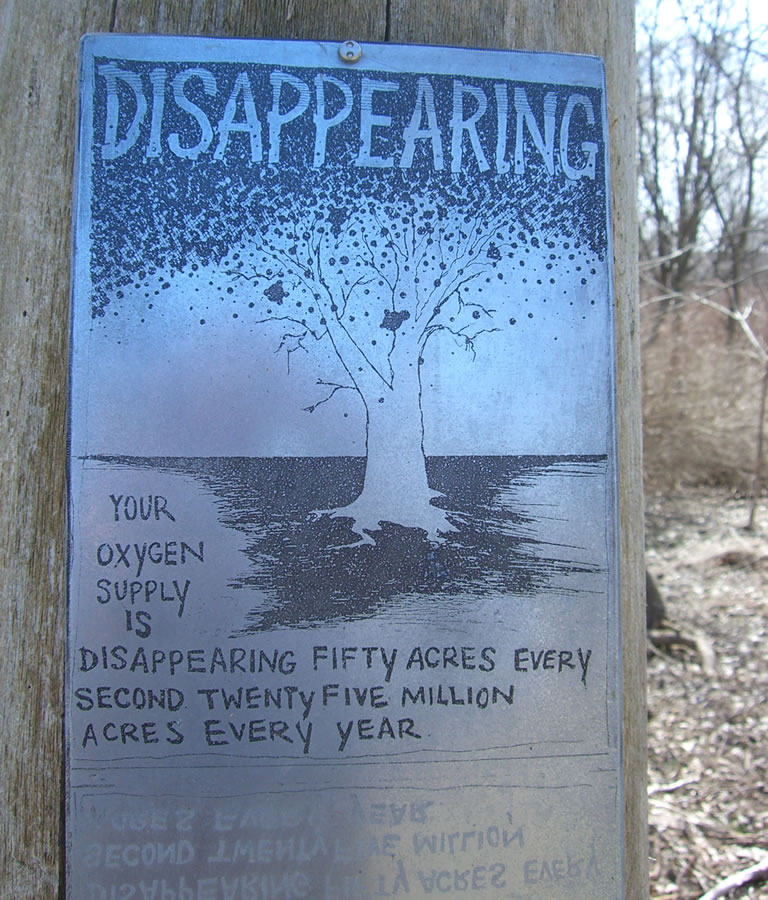
Zinc etched plates created by artist Rick Mills. Walking Trees gives voice to trees along the trails.

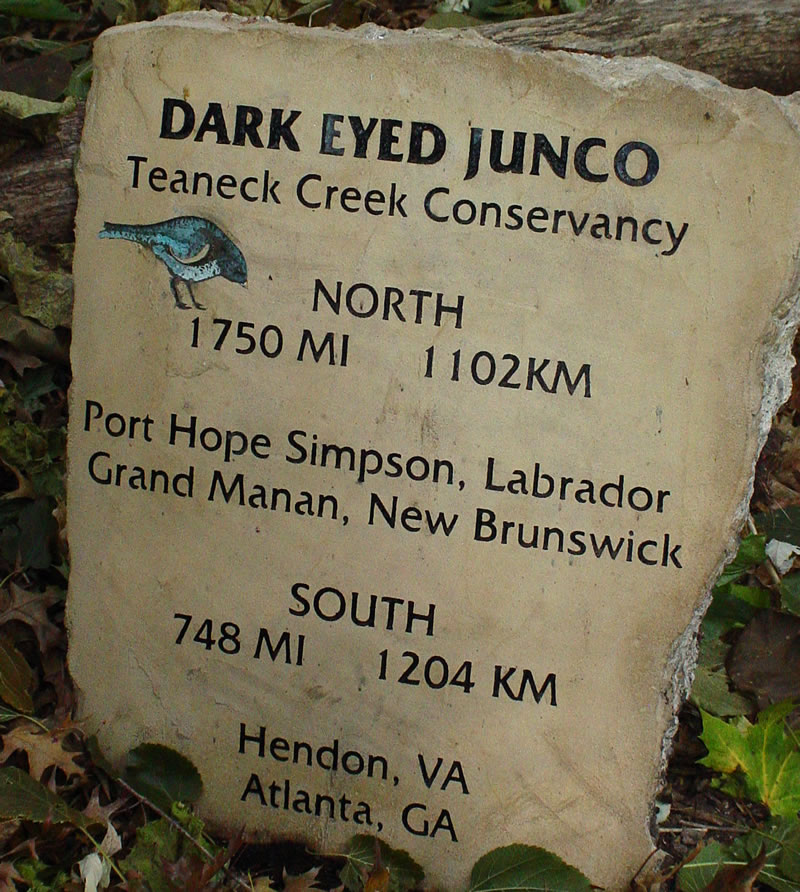
Lynn Hull's Migration Mileposts. Created from concrete debris from construction of Route 80 and 95.

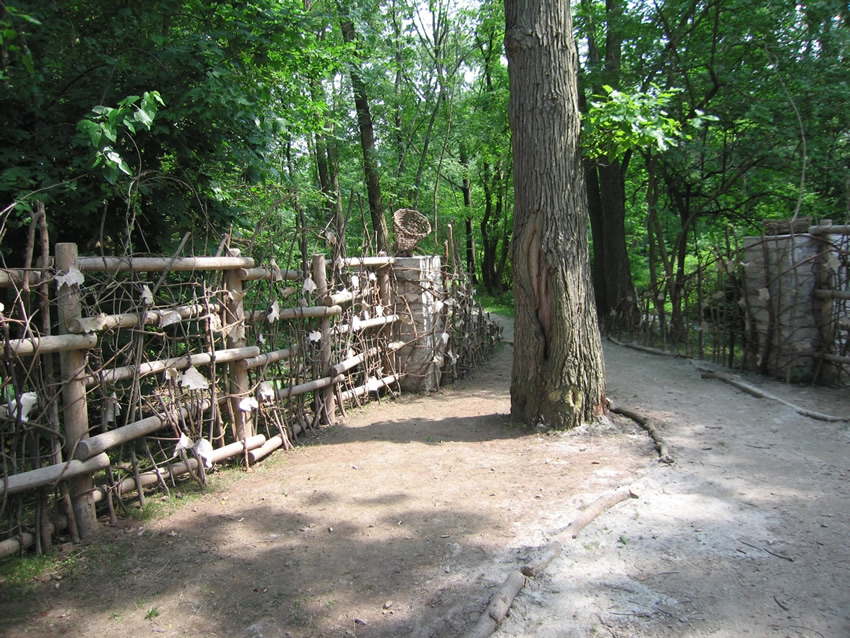
Jane Ingram Allen's entrance and gateway into the Teaneck Creek Conservancy.
