= Genie Energy =

American energy company

Genie Energy Ltd.
- Type: Public
- Traded as: NYSE: GNE (Class B); Russell Microcap Index component
- Industry: Oil and gas industry Electricity
- Founder: Howard Jonas
- Headquarters: Newark, New Jersey, United States
- Key people: Michael Stein (CEO); Avi Goldin (CFO); Geoff Rochwarger (Vice Chairman); Michael Stein (COO and CEO of Genie Retail Energy)
- Revenue: US$280.30 million (2018)
- Operating income: US$9.02 million (2018)
- Net income: US$22.78 million (2018)
- Total assets: US$146.86 million (2018)
- Total equity: US$92.66 million (2018)
- Subsidiaries: Genie Retail Energy; Genie Oil and Gas
- Website: www.genie.com

Genie Energy Ltd. is an American energy company headquartered in Newark, New Jersey. It is a holding company comprising Genie Retail Energy, Genie Retail Energy International, Genie Energy Services, and Genie Energy Oil and Gas. Michael Stein is the chief executive officer

In 2004, seeking to diversify, IDT Telecom’s Founder, Chairman and CEO, Howard Jonas, launched its first Retail Energy Provider or “REP” and enrolled its first energy supply customers. Then, in October, 2011, Genie Energy Ltd. (NYSE:GNE), was spun-off from IDT Corporation as an independent public company, at which point Class B common stock of Genie Energy Ltd. began trading on the NYSE under the ticker symbol "GNE".

Genie's founder and chairman is Howard Jonas. Michael Stein is the company's Chief Executive Officer of Genie Energy and Chief Executive Officer of Genie Retail Energy. Avi Goldin serves as the company's CFO.

The president of its Israeli subsidiary is Effie Eitam. Genie Energy's Strategic advisory board is composed of: Dick Cheney since 2009 (former vice president of the United States), Rupert Murdoch (media mogul and chairman of News Corp), James Woolsey (former CIA director), Larry Summers (former head of the US Treasury), Michael Steinhardt, Jacob Rothschild, and Mary Landrieu, former United States Senator from Louisiana.

In 2013, IDT Energy, Inc., a subsidiary of Genie Energy, acquired both Dallas-based Diversegy, LLC a commercial energy advisory and its network marketing channel, Epiq Energy. They are now wholly owned subsidiaries of Genie Energy Ltd.

== Genie Retail Energy ==
Genie Retail Energy (GRE) comprises the company’s domestic electricity and natural gas supply companies. Commonly referred to as “Retail Energy Providers” or “REPs”, these companies offer traditional and renewable/green energy supply options to residential and small/medium commercial clients throughout deregulated energy states in the United States. GRE companies purchase electricity and natural gas in the wholesale markets which it resells to residential and small business customers in New York, New Jersey, New Hampshire, Pennsylvania, Connecticut, Ohio, Rhode Island, Illinois, Massachusetts, Maine, Delaware, Texas, Maryland, and Washington, DC. Commercial natural gas supply customers are also served in the state of Florida. These companies offer a variety of products and services, including fixed rate and variable rate energy supply plans, traditional and green electricity options, and clean, carbon offset natural gas programs. Like other REP's, GRE companies compete against incumbent electric and gas utilities as well as over 100 or more other REPs.

In November 2016, Genie Energy acquired Retail Energy Holdings, LLC. (REH), and added REH's brand, Town Square Energy, and meters to Genie Retail Energy's portfolio. In August 2017, Genie Energy announced a joint venture to enter the retail energy market and begin customer acquisition in the United Kingdom. Also in August 2017, Genie Retail Energy acquired Mirabito Natural Gas, a Ft. Lauderdale, Florida-based natural gas supplier to commercial customers.

In January 2019, Genie Retail Energy acquired a majority stake in Lumo Energia, a Finnish supplier of renewable electricity, and earlier this year launched Genie Energy Japan, offering customers a variety of high value electricity supply products in the dynamic Japanese retail market.

In 2022 Lumo unilaterally terminated fixed term and fixed price electricity deals of c. 8,000 consumers, thus causing financial damages of even thousands of Euros to each customer. Lumo offered 2 cent/kWh compensation, equaling few million Euros, while selling electricity derivative assets for €30 million. Finnish consumer protection authority regarded this compensation as inadequate.

== Genie Oil and Gas ==
Genie Oil and Gas (GOGAS) explored for conventional oil in the Israeli-occupied Golan Heights through its Afek Oil and Gas subsidiary, and pursued oil shale projects through American Shale Oil (AMSO), Israel Energy Initiatives (IEI) and Genie Energy Mongolia. AMSO, IEI, and Genie Energy Mongolia are no longer active. 89% of GOGAS was owned by Genie Energy while Jacob Rothschild, Michael Steinhardt and Rupert Murdoch among others held minority interests.

=== Afek Oil and Gas ===
In February 2013, Israeli authorities awarded Afek Oil and Gas an exclusive 36-month petroleum exploration license to a 153-square-mile (400 km^{2}) plot in the Israeli-occupied Golan Heights, which the UN recognizes to be Syrian territory. Afek subsequently conducted above-ground geophysical tests and based on its preliminary analysis, has applied for a ten well exploratory drilling program. South of Katzrin in the southern Golan Heights in 2015, Afek discovered a substantial amount of oil and natural gas reserves which would make Israel energy self-sufficient. (Note: As of 2015, Israel consumes 270,000 barrels of oil per day.) The company had drilled a series of exploratory wells including Ness-5, just northwest of the Avnei Eitan and Nov moshavim and south of Kibbutz Natur and the town of Katzrin; Ness-3, near the Bnei Yehuda industrial area; Ness-6, located near the entrance of Moshav Kanaf, just southeast of Gamla; and Ness 10 north of the Sheikh-Ali Fault. In November 2017, the company announced that it suspended its exploratory drilling program as the well's target zone does not contain commercially producible quantities of oil or natural gas.

Human rights groups have said the drilling violates international law as Golan Heights is an occupied territory.

=== American Shale Oil ===
American Shale Oil (AMSO) was a joint venture between Genie Energy and Total S.A. Genie announced in May 2016 that the partners were closing the venture. and its pilot plant facilities located outside of Rifle, Colorado, were subsequently decommissioned and removed. AMSO received in 2006 a Research, Development and Demonstration (RD&D) lease from the U.S. Bureau of Land Management in Colorado's Piceance Basin in order to develop a process for generating oil and gas from deep buried oil shale. The lease comprised a tract of 160 acres (65 ha), and was granted for an initial term of 10 years with the possibility of up to a 5-year extension upon proof of diligent progress toward commercial production. AMSO's tech team was headed by Dr. Alan Burnham, a scientist at Lawrence Livermore National Laboratory. AMSO's proposed technology was called CCR (Conduction, Convection, Reflux).

=== Israel Energy Initiatives ===
Israel Energy Initiatives (IEI) was founded in 2008 to develop oil shale in Israel. In July 2011, the company received a one-year extension of a three-year license to explore oil shale resources on 238 square kilometres (92 sq mi) in Israel's Shefela region. In September 2014, a government planning committee rejected a building permit for the project. The committee decision essentially killed the project, as IEI did not pursue any means of appeal. By the time of the committee ruling most of the staff of IEI, including Chief Scientist Harold Vinegar, had moved to work at the sister company, Afek.

IEI planned to use In-Situ Conversion Process technology for its pilot project, following the format a 1995 trial by Royal Dutch Shell. Shell subsequently shut down its work on developing the technology.

Israel's major environmental organizations, including the Jewish National Fund, the Society for the Protection of Nature in Israel, Greenpeace, and the Israel Union for Environmental Defense protested against the IEI license. Environmental concerns include the potential for contaminating Israel's Shfela aquifer, which runs underneath the Shfela oil shale formation, for destroying a rural region of Israel that currently promotes eco-tourism, and for reversing Israel's efforts to reduce greenhouse gas emissions. Residents of the local community of Adullam and their supporters led the campaign to stop the IEI work, citing both the environmental damage and the questionable economic value of the project.

== See also ==
- Energy Triangle
