= Howard Jonas =

American businessman

Howard S. Jonas (born 2 June 1956) is an American businessman, and the founder and chairman of IDT Corporation and Genie Energy.

== Biography ==
Jonas graduated from The Bronx High School of Science and then received a B.A. in economics from Harvard University in 1978. Although not raised an Orthodox Jew, he funds a range of Orthodox as well as other Jewish causes across the ideological spectrum, and has made major investments in Israel as well. It is estimated that 25 to 40 percent of the 5,000 employees at IDT are Orthodox.

== Career ==
Jonas is the founder and has been President of Jonas Media Group since its inception in 1979.

In August 1990, Jonas founded IDT Corp. (NYSE: IDT) and has been chairman of the board since its inception. He was CEO of the company from December 1991 until July 2001, president from December 1991 to September 1996 and treasurer from inception to 2002.

Jonas has also been the chairman of the board of directors of IDT Telecom, since December 1999 and a director of IDT Capital, Inc. since September 2004. He was co-chairman of the board of directors of IDT Entertainment, Inc. from November 2004 until August 2006. Since August 2006, Jonas has been a director of Starz Media Holdings, LLC, Starz Media, LLC and Starz Foreign Holdings, LLC, each of which is an affiliate of the company. Jonas is also the founder and has been president of Jonas Publishing since its inception in 1979. He was the chairman of the board of directors of Net2Phone from October 2001 to October 2004, the vice chairman of the board of directors of Net2Phone from October 2004 to June 2006 and has been the chairman since June 2006.

Jonas is the founder of Genie Energy (NYSE: GNE, GNEPRA) and was its chairman since it was spun off from IDT Corporation in October 2011. In addition, he has been a director of IDT Energy since June 2007. In 2013, Genie Energy was granted exclusive oil and gas exploration rights in the southern part of the Golan Heights by the Netanyahu government. Jonas was CEO of Genie Energy from January 2014 until November 2017.

In May 2017, the businessman and telecom speculator agreed to sell one of his companies, Straight Path Communications, a long-struggling wireless venture, to Verizon Communications for $3.1 billion.

Jonas is chairman of the board and chief executive officer at Rafael Holdings. He has been a director of Rafael Pharmaceuticals since April 2013 and was appointed chairman of the board in April 2016.

== Publications ==
In 2006, Jonas published his second book: I'm Not the Boss, I Just Work Here. An article by Jonas entitled "But Will Good Character Pay My Bills?" appeared in an anthology of articles compiled and edited by Moshe Kaplan in 2008 entitled Be a Mensch. He also wrote a book called On a Roll.
