= Holy Name Medical Center =

Coordinates: 40.8819°N 74.0091°W

Geography
- Location: 718 Teaneck Rd; Teaneck, NJ 07666; U.S.

Organisation
- Care system: Medicare (US), Medicaid, Charity care
- Type: General

Services
- Emergency department: Yes
- Beds: 361

History
- Founded: 1925

Links
- Website: http://www.holyname.org/

Holy Name Medical Center is a fully accredited, not-for-profit healthcare facility based in Teaneck, Bergen County, New Jersey, United States, with off-site locations throughout Bergen, Hudson, and Passaic counties.

In response to the need for better medical care in Bergen County and the fear of another influenza epidemic, Dr. Frank McCormack and Dr. George Pitkin working with Mother General Agatha Brown of the Sisters of St. Joseph of Peace in 1925 to purchase a suitable site for a new hospital.

The comprehensive 361-bed medical center offers medical practice and technology. With its growing Korean Medical Program, Holy Name Medical Center has undertaken an effort to provide comprehensive health care services to underinsured and uninsured Korean patients from a wide area and also launched a similar Chinese Medical Program and Filipino Medical Program in 2015 as components of its larger Asian Medical Program, with an Asian Dementia Center planned in 2016.

The institution was known as Holy Name Hospital until its name was changed in March 2010.

On July 10, 2020, the hospital, once called a 'war zone' in the COVID-19 pandemic in New Jersey, reported it had no patients with the virus.

== Programs and services ==
Holy Name Medical Center provides health care across a continuum that encompasses education, prevention, early intervention, comprehensive treatment options, rehabilitation and wellness maintenance – from conception through end-of-life.

In addition to patient care, the institution educates registered nurses and licensed practical nurses in the Holy Name Medical Center School of Nursing.
