= Phibro Animal Health =

American animal health and nutrition company

Phibro Animal Health Corporation
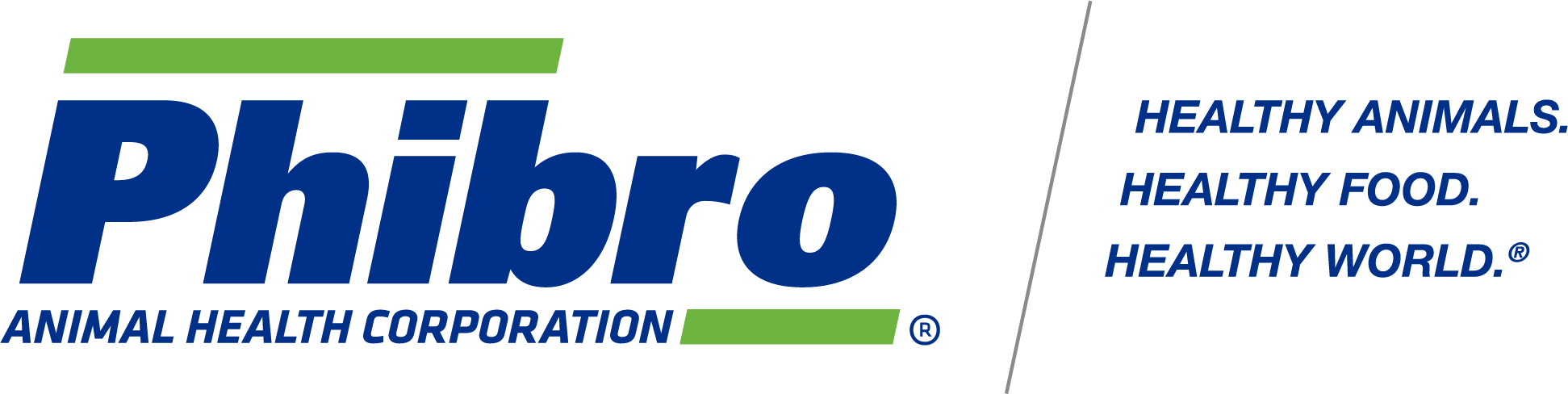
- Type: Public
- Traded as: Nasdaq: PAHC; S&P 600 Component
- Industry: Animal health and nutrition
- Headquarters: Teaneck, New Jersey, U.S.
- Key people: Jack Bendheim (chairman); Larry Miller (COO)
- Revenue: ▲US$833 million (2021)
- Number of employees: 1,400
- Website: pahc.com

Phibro Animal Health Corporation is an American animal health and mineral nutrition company. Its products include antibacterials, anticoccidials, anthelmintics, as well as animal nutrition and vaccines for livestock. The company operates through three segments Mineral Nutrition, Performance Materials, and Animal Health, from which most of its revenue is derived. The company operates in the United States, Latin America, Canada, Europe, Middle East, Africa, and Asia-Pacific. It is incorporated in Delaware.

== History ==
The company was founded in 1946 as Philipp Brothers Chemicals, Inc.

In 1974, it acquired Koffolk, an animal nutrition company based in Israel.

In 2000, Pfizer sold its medicated feed additives business to Phibro Animal Health

In 2003, the company changed its name from Philipp Brothers Chemicals to Phibro Animal Health.

In 2009, the company acquired Baltzell US mineral nutrition business and ABIC Laboratories, a vaccine maker from Israel.

In 2014, Phibro Animal Health held an initial public offering and became listed on the Nasdaq.

In 2018, the company established a biotech facility in Sligo, Ireland producing animal health vaccines. It became the company's first manufacturing plant in Europe.

== See also ==
- PetMed Express
- The Vets
- Phibro
