= Teaneck Fire Department =

Emergency services in New Jersey, United States

Operational area
- Country: United States
- State: New Jersey
- County: Bergen County
- Township: Teaneck
- Address: 1231 Teaneck Road, Teaneck NJ, 07666

Agency overview
- Established: 1915 (Origins date to 1904)
- Annual calls: 5,498 (2025)
- Employees: 92 (Authorized 2020): Uniformed personnel: 90; Civilian members: 2
- Staffing: Career
- Fire chief: Joseph Berchtold
- EMS level: First Responder & BLS

Facilities and equipment
- Battalions: 1
- Stations: 4
- Engines: 3
- Ladders: 1
- Tenders: 1
- Rescue boats: 2

Website
- Official website

The Teaneck Fire Department (TFD) was established in 1915 and provides fire protection, rescue and first responder emergency medical services to the Township of Teaneck, New Jersey. The TFD has 93 employees: 91 uniformed firefighters and 2 civilian employees. The department is directly responsible for over 41,000 residents living within the 6.23 square miles of Teaneck. Furthermore, The TFD routinely provides mutual aid to 6 surrounding communities in Bergen County (Boro of Bergenfield, Boro of Bogota, City of Englewood, City of Hackensack, Boro of New Milford and Village of Ridgefield Park), further assisting an additional 139,000 people over an additional 18.52 square miles.

== History ==
=== Formation ===
The question of forming Teaneck's first volunteer company was first considered in the summer of 1904 by the residents of Manhattan Heights and Selvage developments. Prior to the end of 1904, the residents officially formed the Upper Teaneck Volunteer Fireman's Association. They organized as Company #1 and were quartered at 1188 Teaneck Road. Organizers included Kenloch V. Ridley and Walter Kaltenback, the first paid chief of department and the first paid firefighter respectively when the department transitioned to a career (paid) department. Company #1 protected north of Cedar Lane to the Bergenfield, the sections of Teaneck known as Manhattan Heights, West Englewood Park and Upper Teaneck. They also responded as the second due engine in the remaining three districts. Company #1 was called upon to fight their first fire on December 8, 1904. On October 6, 1906 they held their first drill. Both of these would be first's in the history of The Teaneck Fire Department. In 1907 the company was forced to move to 18 Fairview Avenue but also obtained Teaneck's first motorized fire apparatus. The building at 18 Fairview Avenue was Fire Headquarters from 1915 until 1920

Teaneck's second volunteer company was formed in 1908 by the residents of Bogota Park as the Cedar Volunteer Firemen's Association and organized Hose Company #2. From 1907 to 1913 they were located in a member's barn on Linden Avenue. Company #2 protected north to West Englewood Park, and west of the West Shore railroad to the Hackensack River. In 1912 a new station was constructed on Kenwood Place which remained Station 2 and housed Engine 2 until 1953.

The Lower Teaneck Volunteer Fireman's Association was the third Company was organized in October 1911 as Hose Company #1. They were quartered in a member's barn on the south end of Teaneck Road. They served the section of town known as Lower Teaneck. In 1914 the members rented a garage at 375 Queen Anne Road to store equipment and serve the expanding South Queen Anne Road business district. Shortly before World War I, in 1913 the Company acquired two building lots on Morningside Terrace, and in 1920 completed building their quarters on the lots. This was 395 Morningside Terrace which was Station 3 and housed Engine 3 from 1920 until 1990.

The Glenwood Park Volunteer Firemen's Association, the 4th and final volunteer company, was organized in 1911 and quartered in a blacksmith shop at Glenwood Ave and Fabry Terrace until 1913. In 1913 they relocated to Glenwood Ave and Hemlock Terrace South. When Teaneck went to a career department in 1915, The Glenwood Park Volunteer Firemen retained their status as a complete volunteer company and responded to first alarm fires in their district and also to second alarm fires in all other parts of the Township. They remained active until 1948 when they were disbanded and its members went on to organize the Teaneck Volunteer Ambulance Corps

Teaneck's Fire Chiefs
Kenloch V. Ridley	1915–1934	Donald Wynne	1986–1989	Anthony Verley	2010–2018
Francis A. Murray	1934–1956	William Hillermeier	1989–1994	Jordan Zaretsky	2018–2022
William Lindsay	1956–1966	William Norton	1994–2005	Jordan Zaretsky	2018–2022
Joseph R. Murray	1966–1972	John Bauer	2005–2006	Joseph Berchtold	2022–Present
Carl O. Anderson	1972–1986	Robert J. Montgomery	2006–2010	Joseph Berchtold	2022–Present

== Organization ==
Teaneck Fire Department is a career fire department that has 91 uniformed members, out of a total of 93 authorized positions, including 31 officers and 60 firefighters. 84 uniformed members are assigned to 4 platoons (shifts) and 9 members are in the administrative, fire prevention and training bureaus. There are 84 members that are assigned to a "platoon" or "on the line", and work 24-hour shifts or "tours" (0800–0800). The 24-hour tours are further "split" into 10-hour day tours (0800–1800) and 14-hour night tours (1800–0800). Each platoon has 21 members assigned to it and staff the townships four fire stations 24 hours a day, 365 days a year. TFD is part of the Mid-Bergen Mutual Aid Association (Teaneck, Hackensack, Englewood, Bergenfield, Bogota, and Ridgefield Park).

=== Fire Suppression and Rescue Operations ===
The Fire Suppression and Rescue Operations are commanded by the on duty tour commander. The tour commander is in charge of the platoon on duty and is usually a Battalion Chief. The Battalion Chief/tour commander reports to the Chief of the Department. Each platoon consists of: 1 Battalion Chief, 1 Captain, 4 Lieutenants and 15 Firefighters.

=== Fire Investigation Unit (FIU) ===
The FIU conducts investigations of all fires for origin and cause within the Township of Teaneck. If arson is suspected, FIU works with the Teaneck Police Department, Bergen County Sheriffs, The Bergen County Arson Squad and any State/Federal agency required.

=== Fire Training Bureau ===
The Teaneck Fire Department, a recognized New Jersey Division of Fire Safety Eligible Organization, conducts thousands of man-hours of training every year. Many of the training courses delivered by the Training Bureau are courses and training materials that have been developed by the New Jersey Division of Fire Safety and the National Fire Academy. Other materials presented consisted of courses developed by the Federal Government or in house using resident subject-matter experts. Whether it is through classroom, presentations, hands-on, federal, state or regional sponsored training. The Training Bureau has 1 Battalion Chief assigned to it.

=== Fire Alarm Bureau ===
Teaneck has over 315 fire alarm boxes located within the Township. The majority of them are Gamewell Alarm Boxes, but there are a few electronic fire alarm boxes within The Township. Any of the boxes can be pulled to alert The Teaneck Fire Department to any incident; ranging from fire calls, to rescue calls, to medical calls. Many of the boxes are attached to high occupancy buildings, high rises, places of assembly and high hazard buildings. These are referred to as Master boxes, meaning they are attached to a building and tied into their interior alarm system. Should a condition set off an interior alarm, the fire alarm box would also be tripped and the Fire Department would be notified. Most of the fire alarm boxes also have the ability to be manually pulled by a bystander. The fire alarm boxes operate independent of the electrical grid, telephone systems and private alarm companies.

=== Fire Prevention Bureau ===
The Fire Prevention Bureau enforces Teaneck's Fire Code. The fire code helps mitigate fire hazards within all structures regardless of occupancy within the townships jurisdiction. Periodic inspections of high life hazard buildings and commercial occupancy's are mandatory under the fire code (e.g. schools, local businesses, factories, hospitals, nursing homes, all commercial businesses, industrial and office buildings). All new constructions, renovations and additions are inspected by the fire official or the fire inspectors prior to a certificate of occupancy being issued. The Bureau is headed by 1 Fire Official (Lieutenant) and also has 2 fire inspectors (Lieutenants) and 1 clerk.

== Communications ==
As of 9/25/2024 The Teaneck Fire Department is dispatched by The Hackensack Fire Department out of Hackensack Fire Headquarters at 205 State Street. Teaneck Fire Department utilizes two frequencies: the dispatch or "main" channel (158.82000 MHz) and a fireground channel. (156.00000 MHz)

== Operations ==
As of 2020, the department serves the second largest populous (41,246), third most households (≈14,024) and seventh largest area (6.226 square miles) in Bergen County. Furthermore, when requested they regularly respond on mutual aid to: Hackensack, Englewood, Bergenfield, Bogota, Ridgefield Park & New Milford. The department responds 24 hours a day and works closely with the Teaneck Police Department & Teaneck Volunteer Ambulance Corps. The Teaneck Fire Department typically responds to approximately 4000 - 6000 calls per year involving mainly: structure fires, vehicle fires, electrical emergencies, natural gas releases, carbon monoxide incidents, explosions, rescues, outside fires, vehicle extrication's, waterborne rescue, forcing entry, service calls, EMS calls etc.

The Teaneck Fire Department operates out of 4 firehouses. There is 3 engines, 1 ladder truck, 2 spare engines, 1 spare ladder truck, along with various special and support units. A Battalion Chief is usually the daily tour commander and is in charge of all 4 stations.

The department has an authorized strength of 93 members: 1 Chief of Department, 2 Deputy Chiefs, 5 Battalion Chiefs (1 is the Training & Safety Officer), 4 Captains, 19 Lieutenants (3 are Fire Prevention Officers) 61 Firefighters & 2 Clerks. (Secretaries, 1 is in Fire Prevention & 1 is Administrative)

Motor vehicle accidents occurs quite often in Teaneck due to the major highways (Rt. 4, Rt. 95 & Rt. 80) that are within the department's jurisdictions and main thoroughfares (Teaneck Rd, Queen Anne Rd, River Rd, Glenwood Ave, West Englewood Ave, West Forest Ave, Cedar Ln, Degraw Ave) that pass through and/or are in the town. The fire department regularly responds to motor vehicle accidents, with the New Jersey State Police, Bergen County Sheriffs Office and/or Teaneck Police Department and the Teaneck Volunteer Ambulance Corps on the aforementioned highways, local thoroughfares and streets.

The Township of Teaneck is geographically split into 4 distinct quadrants (districts); NJ State Route 4 runs east/west and splits the township to a north-side & south-side, and the CSX River Subdivision Freight Line runs north–south and splits the township to an east-side and west-side. Due to the limited ways to cross either of the barriers, each district has a firehouse in order to facilitate a rapid response to a call.

== Stations and Apparatus ==
Teaneck's Firehouses and Companies as of 11/18/2020
Firehouse	Address	Neighborhood(s)	Company	Special Unit(s)	Reserve/Spare Unit(s)
Headquarters	1231 Teaneck Road	Manhattan Heights & Washington Heights	Tower Ladder 21	Car 32 (Tour Commander), Bergen County Foam Tender 101, Box 54 FU-1 & FU-3 (Canteen/Rehab)	Engine 27
Station 2	617 Cedar Lane	Cedar Lane & Bogota Park	Engine 22	Box 54 FU-2 (Canteen/Rehab), Bergen County Thawing Unit	Engine 26
Station 3	370 Teaneck Road	Glenwood Park & Frog Hollow	Squad 23	Marine 1 & Marine 2 (Rescue Boats), Bergen County Quick Attack Vehicle, Foam Trailer	
Station 4	1375 Windsor Road	West Englewood	Squad 24		Tower Ladder 22

- As of 11/18/2020 all apparatus designated with a 2 digit number

== Box 54 Special Services Unit ==
The Teaneck Fire Department also includes The Box 54 Club, which is staffed by volunteers & similar in nature to the Bell & Siren Club of Newark and the Gong Club of Jersey City, Box 54 provides communications, canteen (beverages & snacks), rehabilitation and fireground support services where ever first responders have an extended presence (fires, hazmat situations, police actions, rescue operations, parades & funerals) and other events.

== Ranks of the Teaneck Fire Department ==
Title	Insignia (shirt collar)	Insignia (dress jacket)*
Chief of Department		5 Gold Crossed Bugles & 5 gold arm sleeve bands
Deputy Chief		3 Crossed Gold Bugles & 3 gold arm sleeve bands
Battalion Chief (Tour Commander)		2 Crossed Gold Bugles & 2 gold arm sleeve band
Captain (Headquarters Company Officer)		& 2 silver arm sleeve bands
Lieutenant (Firehouse 2,3 & 4 Company Officer)		& 1 silver arm sleeve band
Firefighter	**	**
Probationary Firefighter ("Probie")	**	**
*Members receive a hash mark on their Class A sleeve for every 5 years of service. Firefighter to Captain is silver whereas Battalion Chief to Chief of Department is gold **Firefighters & Probies do not have an insignia on their Class A (Dress) or Class B (Station) uniforms.

== Closed, disbanded, relocated or reorganized fire companies ==
Spurces:

=== Closed ===
- Ladder 2: 617 Cedar Lane – Closed 7/1/1963
- Engine 1: 1231 Teaneck Road – Closed 11/15/2018
- Rescue 1: 1231 Teaneck Road – Closed 11/15/2018

=== Disbanded ===
- Upper Teaneck Volunteer Firemen's Association – Became Company 1 (Engine 1) in 1915
- Cedar Volunteer Firemen's Association – Became Company 2 (Engine 2) in 1915
- Lower Teaneck Volunteer Firemen's Association – Became Company 3 (Engine 3) in 1915
- Glenwood Park Volunteer Firemen's Association – Disbanded in 1948

=== Relocated ===
- Engine 1: 1188 Teaneck Road – Relocated to 16 Fairview Avenue in 1907
- Engine 1: 16 Fairview Avenue – Relocated to 1217 Teaneck Road in 1920
- Engine 1: 1217 Teaneck Road – Relocated to 1231 Teaneck Road (Headquarters) in 1948
- Engine 2: 513 Kenwood Place – Relocated to 617 Cedar Lane (Station 2) in 1954
- Engine 3: 395 Morningside Terrace – Relocated to 370 Teaneck Road (Station 3) in 1990

=== Reorganized ===
- Engine 3: 370 Teaneck Road – Reorganized on 11/4/2020 at 1200 hours as Squad Company 23
- Engine 4: 1375 Windsor Road – Reorganized on 11/18/2020 at 2230 hours as Squad Company 24

== Union Representation ==
All non-executive members of the Teaneck Fire Department are represented by the Firefighters Mutual Benevolent Association (FMBA) The Fire Officers: lieutenants, captains, and battalion chiefs, are a part of FMBA Local 242 whereas the firefighters are a part of FMBA Local 42.
