= Banta-Coe House =

Historic house in New Jersey, US

- U.S. National Register of Historic Places
- New Jersey Register of Historic Places
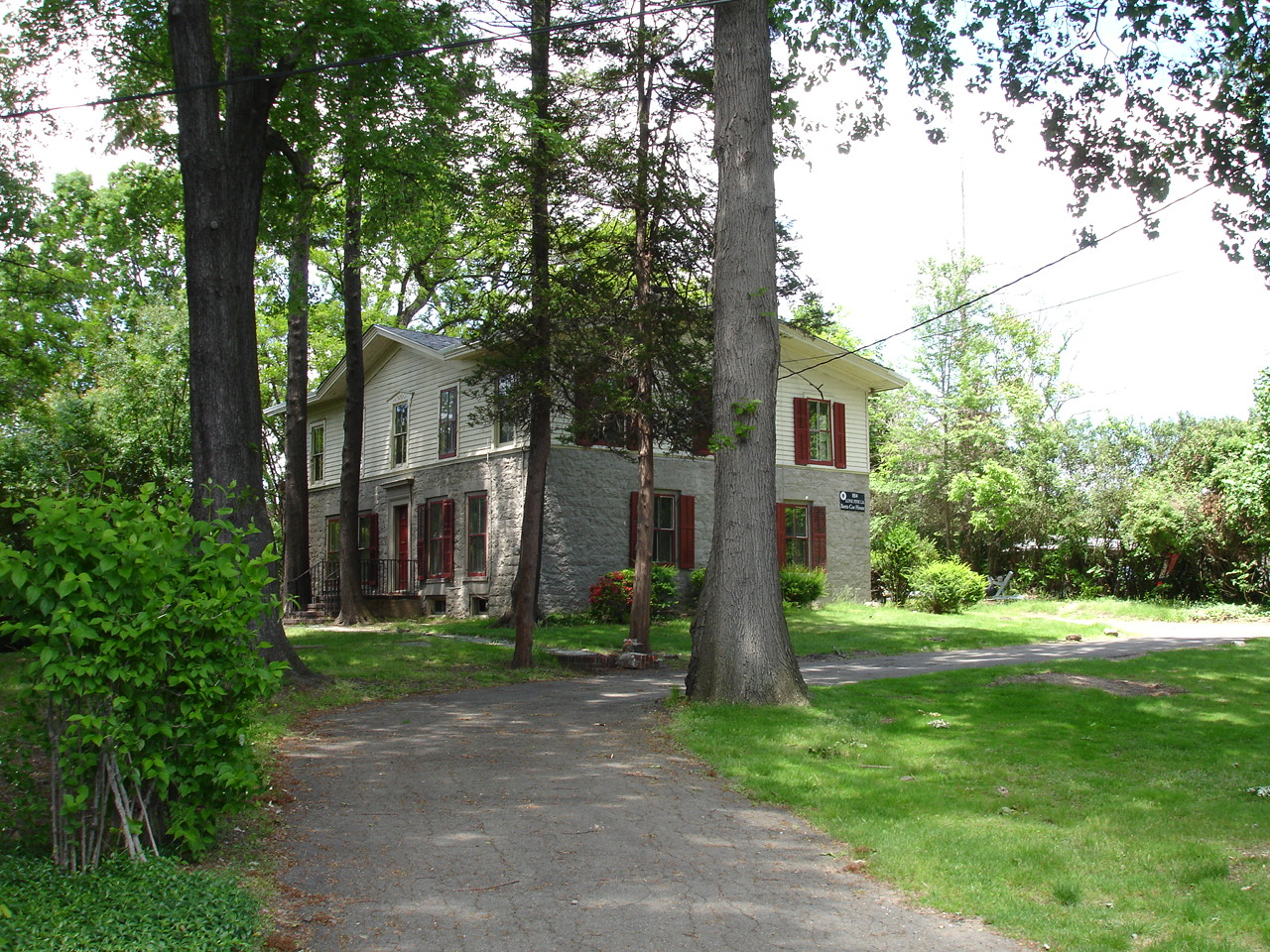
- The Banta-Coe House in the spring of 2006

- Location within Bergen County, New Jersey
- Location: 884 Lone Pine Lane, Teaneck, New Jersey
- Coordinates: 40°53′41″N 74°1′51″W
- Area: 0.1 acres (0.040 ha)
- Built: c. 1700
- Architectural style: Colonial, Dutch Colonial
- NRHP reference No.: 83001460
- NJRHP No.: 172

Significant dates
- Added to NRHP: January 10, 1983
- Designated NJRHP: November 3, 1980

The Banta-Coe House is a Dutch colonial-style historic home located on Lone Pine Lane in Teaneck, Bergen County, New Jersey, United States, overlooking the Hackensack River on the campus of Fairleigh Dickinson University. Dating back to the early 18th century, it is one of the oldest remaining colonial-era homes in New Jersey.

From the time the house was originally constructed until its purchase by FDU, the home was owned by a sequence of four families. The Banta family owned the house during the 18th century and it was sold to the Coe family in the early 19th century. The Coe family owned the house for most of the 19th century, during which time they renovated the house and added a second story. The house was purchased by the Hampton family in 1940 who resided in the home until it was acquired by FDU in 1993, as its campus was enlarged further south of New Jersey Route 4 along the Hackensack River.

When it was acquired by FDU the house had many original features, including hand-hewn wooden floors, though portions of the house had been updated in the 1960s. Plans were made in 2000 by FDU to create an environmental resource center in the house, which would be used to document the historic pollution of the Hackensack River and to document its cleanup and recovery. In 2006, FDU made plans to renovate the home, with possible uses for the home including use as a site for the university's historical archives of New Jersey on the upper level, while the lower level could be used for exhibition space. $30,000 was raised towards the renovation by the university, which was hoping to obtain a 3:2 matching grant from Bergen County.

The house was added the National Register of Historic Places as Building #83001460 as of January 10, 1983, and was added to the New Jersey Register of Historic Places as #172 on November 3, 1980, as part of a "Thematic Nomination of Early Stone Houses of Bergen County".

== See also ==
- National Register of Historic Places listings in Bergen County, New Jersey
