= Teaneck, New Jersey =

Township in Bergen County, New Jersey, United States

- Township
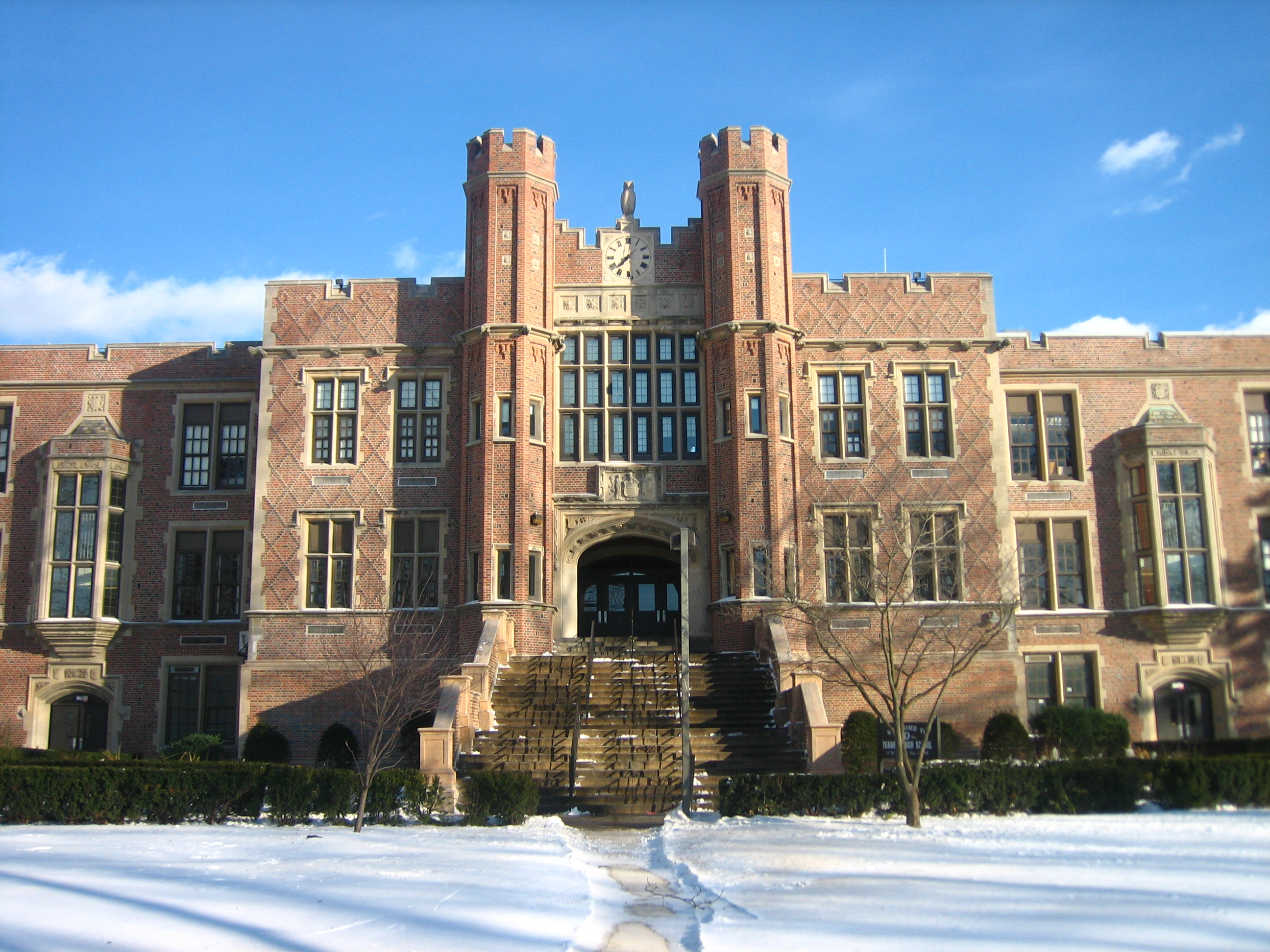
- Teaneck High School

- Seal

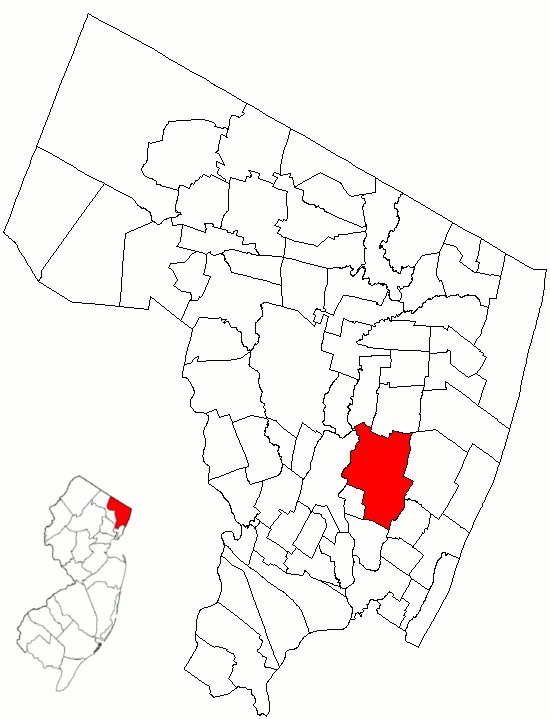
- Location of Teaneck in Bergen County highlighted in red (right). Inset map: Location of Bergen County in New Jersey highlighted in red (left).
- Interactive map of Teaneck, New Jersey
- Location in Bergen County Location in New Jersey Location in the United States
- Coordinates: 40.890317°N 74.011478°W
- Country: United States
- State: New Jersey
- County: Bergen
- Incorporated: February 19, 1895

Government
  - Type: Faulkner Act Council-Manager
  - Body: Township Council
  - Mayor: Mark Schwartz (term ends December 31, 2028)
  - Manager: Jaclyn Hashmat (effective July 1, 2024)
  - Clerk: Douglas Ruccione

Area
  - Total: 6.24 sq mi (16.15 km^{2})
  - Land: 6.04 sq mi (15.65 km^{2})
  - Water: 0.20 sq mi (0.51 km^{2}) 3.16%
  - Rank: 253rd of 565 in state 7th of 70 in county
- Elevation: 128 ft (39 m)

Population (2020)
  - Total: 41,246
  - Estimate (2023): 41,697
  - Rank: 56th of 565 in state 2nd of 70 in county
  - Density: 6,828.7/sq mi (2,636.6/km^{2})
  - Rank: 70th of 565 in state 20th of 70 in county
- Time zone: UTC−05:00 (Eastern (EST))
  - Summer (DST): UTC−04:00 (Eastern (EDT))
- ZIP Code: 07666
- Area code: 201
- FIPS code: 3400372360
- GNIS feature ID: 0882227
- Website: www.teanecknj.gov

Teaneck (English pronunciation: /ˈtiːnɛk/) is a township in Bergen County, in the U.S. state of New Jersey. It is a bedroom community in the New York metropolitan area. As of the 2020 United States census, the township's population was 41,246, an increase of 1,470 (+3.7%) from the 2010 census count of 39,776, which in turn reflected an increase of 516 (+1.3%) from the 39,260 counted in the 2000 census. As of 2020, Teaneck was the second-most populous among the 70 municipalities in Bergen County, behind Hackensack, which had a population of 46,030.

Teaneck was created on February 19, 1895, by an act of the New Jersey Legislature from portions of Englewood Township and Ridgefield Township, both of which are now defunct (despite existing municipalities with similar names), along with portions of Bogota and Leonia. Independence followed the result of a referendum held on January 14, 1895, in which voters favored incorporation by a 46–7 margin. To address the concerns of Englewood Township's leaders, the new municipality was formed as a township, rather than succumbing to the borough craze sweeping across Bergen County at the time. On May 3, 1921, and again on June 1, 1926, portions of what had been Teaneck were transferred to Overpeck Township.

Teaneck lies at the junction of Interstate 95 and the eastern terminus of Interstate 80. The township is bisected into north and south portions by Route 4 and east and west by the River Subdivision of CSX Transportation. Commercial development is concentrated in four main shopping areas, on Cedar Lane, Teaneck Road, DeGraw Avenue, and West Englewood Avenue and Queen Anne Road, more commonly known as "The Plaza".

Teaneck's location at the crossroads of river, road, train and other geographical features has made it a site of many momentous events across the centuries. After the American defeat at the Battle of Fort Washington, George Washington and the troops of the Continental Army retreated across New Jersey from the British Army, traveling through Teaneck and crossing the Hackensack River at New Bridge Landing, which has since been turned into a state park and historic site commemorating the events of 1776 and of early colonial life. In 1965, Teaneck voluntarily integrated its public schools, after the Board of Education approved a plan to adopt a bussing program by a 7–2 vote on May 13, 1964. Teaneck has a diverse population, with large Jewish and African American communities, and growing numbers of Hispanic and Asian residents.

== History ==
=== Early history ===
The origin and meaning of the name "Teaneck" is not known, but speculation is that it could come from various Dutch or English words, or it could be Native American in origin, meaning "the woods". An alternative is from the Dutch "Tiene Neck" meaning "neck where there are willows" (from the Dutch "tene" meaning willow).

The earliest uses of the word "Teaneck" were in reference to a series of Lenni Lenape Native American camps near the ridge formed by what became Queen Anne Road. Chief Oratam was the leader of a settlement called "Achikinhesacky" that existed along Overpeck Creek in the area near what became Fycke Lane.

A neighborhood variously called East Hackensack or New Hackensack was established along a ridge on the east bank of the Hackensack River, site of a Native American trail that followed the river's path along what is now River Road, with the earliest known buildings constructed dating back as far as 1704. Other early European settlements were established along what became Teaneck Road, which is the site of a number of Dutch stone houses that remain standing since their construction in the 1700s, several of which have been added to the National Register of Historic Places.

=== Revolutionary War period ===
During November 1776, General George Washington passed through Teaneck in the aftermath of the Battle of Fort Lee, as part of the hasty retreat of Colonial forces from Fort Lee on the Hudson River.

=== Phelps Estate ===
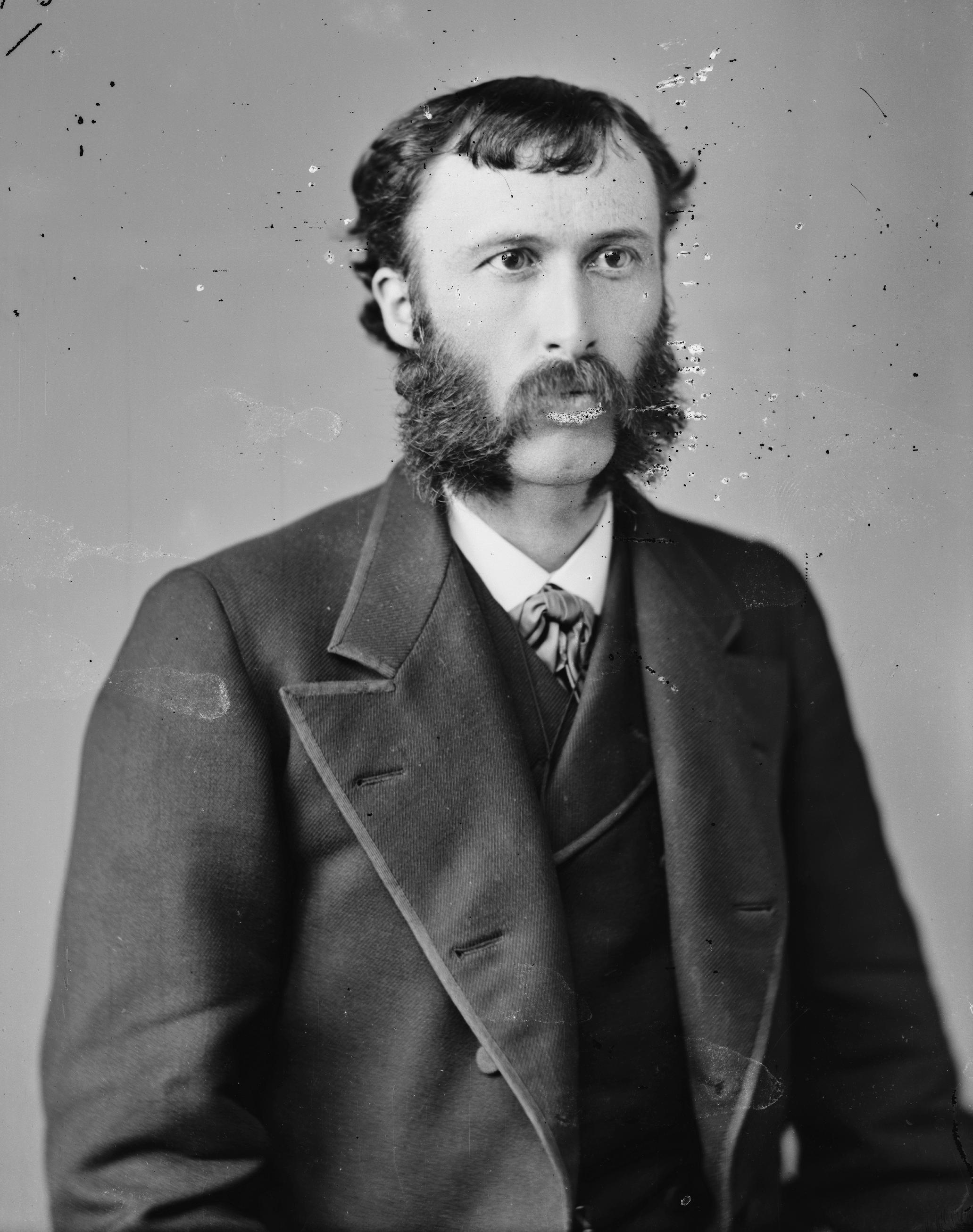
William Walter Phelps

Subsequent development and house construction were focused along the perimeters of the township, with the central part of the community remaining a large property crisscrossed by 30 miles (48 km) of paved roads and trails that were constructed and improved by Phelps.

=== Township formed ===
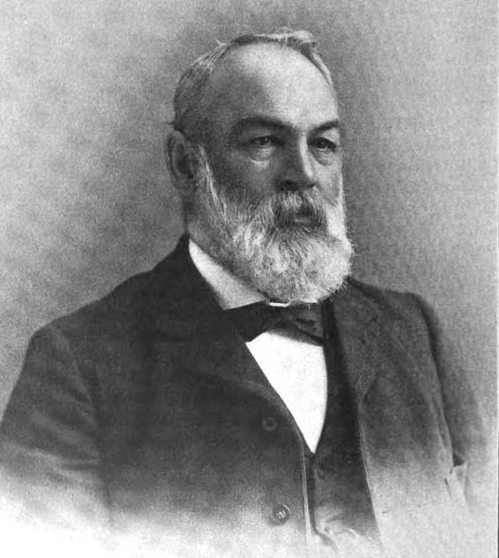
William Weaver Bennett, chairman of the committee which formed Teaneck, and its founding mayor

The Township of Teaneck was established on February 19, 1895, and included portions of Englewood Township, Ridgefield Township and Bogota. Teaneck's choice to incorporate as a township was unusual in an era of "Boroughitis", in which a flood of new municipalities were being formed using the decentralized and locally controlled borough form of government. The other two municipalities formed in Bergen County in 1895 were both boroughs, in addition to the 26 boroughs that were formed in the county in 1894 alone.

In a referendum held on January 14, 1895, 46 of 53 voters approved incorporation as a borough. Citizens of Englewood Township challenged the creation of a borough, but accepted the new municipality as a township, given its more rural character. A bill supporting the creation of the Township of Teaneck was put through the New Jersey General Assembly on February 18, 1895, and the New Jersey Senate on the next day. New Jersey Governor George Werts signed the bill into law, and Teaneck was an independent municipality.

At its incorporation, Teaneck's population was 811. William W. Bennett, overseer of the Phelps Estate, was selected as chairman of the first three-man Township Committee, which focused in its early years on "construction of streets and street lamps (originally gaslights), trolley lines (along DeGraw Avenue), telephones and speeding traffic."

=== Early 20th century ===
The opening of the Phelps Estate in 1927 led to substantial population growth. The George Washington Bridge was completed in 1931, and its connection to Teaneck via Route 4 brought thousands of new home buyers. Between 1920 and 1930, Teaneck's population nearly quadrupled, from 4,192 to 16,513.

Rapid growth led to financial turmoil, and inefficiencies in the town government resulted in the adoption of a new nonpartisan Council-Manager form of government under the 1923 Municipal Manager Law in a referendum on September 16, 1930. A full-time Town Manager, Paul A. Volcker Sr. (the father of future Chairman of the Federal Reserve Paul A. Volcker Jr.), was appointed to handle Teaneck's day-to-day business affairs. During his 20-year term, from 1930 to 1950, Volcker implemented financial management practices and a development plan that included comprehensive zoning regulations, along with a civil service system for municipal employees and a professional fire department.

The New Jersey Supreme Court issued a ruling in 1942 upholding a Teaneck ordinance that had banned pinball machines on the grounds that they were gambling devices rather than a form of amusement.

=== Post–World War II ===
Teaneck was selected in 1949 from more than 10,000 communities as America's model community, with the United States Army saying that the township was chosen because of its "fine municipal spirit and the high quality of its governmental service." Photographs were taken and a film produced about life in Teaneck, which were shown in Occupied Japan and Austria as a part of the Army's education program to show democracy in action.

In 1953, Fairleigh Dickinson College, then with 2,800 students based in Rutherford, New Jersey, merged with the 400-student Bergen Junior College, acquiring its campus in Teaneck, with the Bergen Junior College president saying that "the Teaneck property lends itself to considerable expansion".

After World War II, there was a second major spurt of building and population growth. The African American population in the northeast corner of Teaneck grew substantially starting in the 1960s, accompanied by white flight triggered by blockbusting efforts of township real estate agencies. In 1965, after a struggle to address de facto segregation in housing and education, Teaneck became the first community in the nation where a white majority voluntarily voted for school integration, without a court order requiring the district to implement the change. The sequence of events was the subject of a book titled Triumph in a White Suburb written by township resident Reginald G. Damerell (New York: William Morrow & Company, Inc., 1968).

As de facto racial segregation increased, so did tensions between residents of the northeast and members of the predominantly white male Teaneck Police Department. On the evening of April 10, 1990, the Teaneck Police Department responded to a call from a resident complaining about a teenager with a gun. After an initial confrontation near Bryant School and a subsequent chase, Phillip Pannell, an African American teenager, was shot and killed by Gary Spath, a white Teaneck police officer. Spath said he thought Pannell had a gun and was turning to shoot him. Witnesses said Pannell was unarmed and had been shot in the back. Protest marches, some violent, ensued; most African Americans believed that Pannell had been killed in cold blood, while other residents insisted that Spath had been justified in his actions. Testimony at the trial claimed that Pannell was shot in the back, and that he was carrying a gun. A police officer testified to finding a modified starter's pistol with eight cartridges in Pannell's jacket pocket. Spath was ultimately acquitted on charges of reckless manslaughter in the shooting. Some months after Spath had been cleared, he decided to retire from law enforcement. The incident was an international news event that brought Reverend Al Sharpton and Jesse Jackson to the community and inspired the 1995 book Color Lines: The Troubled Dreams of Racial Harmony in an American Town, by Mike Kelly.

Teaneck, and the neighboring communities of Bergenfield and New Milford, has drawn a large number of Modern Orthodox Jews who have established at least fifteen synagogues and four yeshivas (three high schools and one for young men). It is the functional center of the northern New Jersey Orthodox community, with nearly twenty kosher shops (restaurants, bakeries and supermarkets). It is within ten minutes' driving time of Yeshiva University in New York City.

=== Historic homes ===
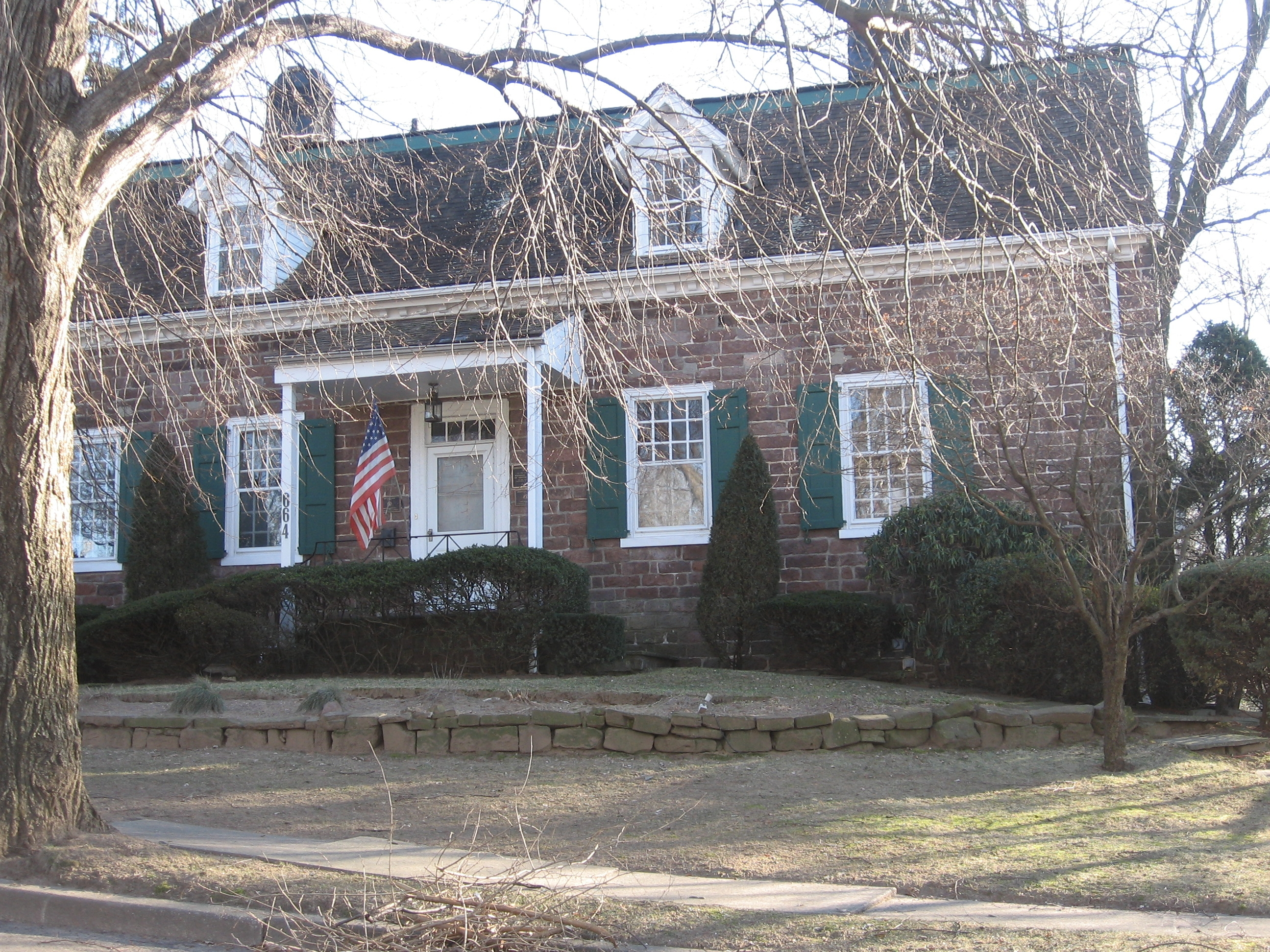
Zabriskie-Kipp-Cadmus House

Several homes in Teaneck date back to the colonial era or the period subsequent to American Revolutionary War and have been preserved and survive to this day. Teaneck sites on the National Register of Historic Places and (other historic homes) include:

- John Ackerman House – 1286 River Road (constructed 1734–1787)
- Banta-Coe House – 884 Lone Pine Lane (c. 18th century, added 1983)
- Brinkerhoff-Demarest House – 493 Teaneck Road (c. 1728, added 1983)
- Christian Cole House – 1617 River Road (constructed c. 1860)
- Draw Bridge at New Bridge – Main Street and Old New Bridge Road over Hackensack River (constructed 1888, added 1989)
- Adam Vandelinda House – 586 Teaneck Road (constructed 1830, added 1983)
- James Vandelinda House – 566 Teaneck Road (constructed 1805–1820, added 1983)
- Caspar Westervelt House – 20 Sherwood Road (constructed 1763, added 1983)
- Zabriskie-Kipp-Cadmus House – 664 River Road (c. 1751, added 1978)
- The William Thurnauer house – Designed by Edward Durell Stone, 628 North Forest Drive (constructed 1949)

== Geography ==
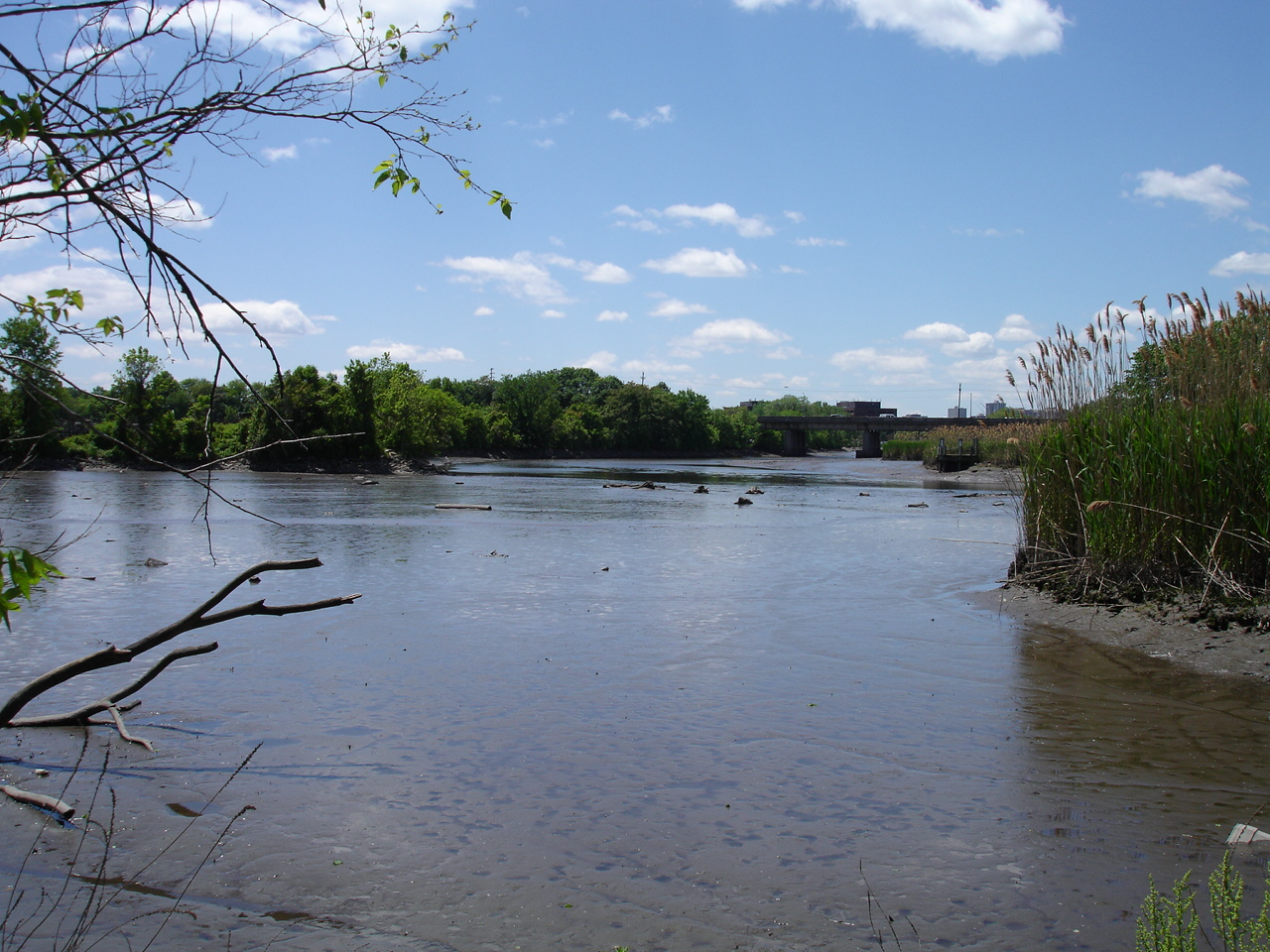
A view of the Hackensack River, taken from the shore in Teaneck

According to the U.S. Census Bureau, the township had a total area of 6.24 square miles (16.15 km^{2}), including 6.04 square miles (15.65 km^{2}) of land and 0.20 square miles (0.51 km^{2}) of water (3.16%).

Teaneck is bordered by eight municipalities in Bergen County, including to the west by River Edge and Hackensack which lie across the Hackensack River, to the north by New Milford and Bergenfield, to the east by Englewood and Leonia, and to the south by Ridgefield Park and Bogota.

Unincorporated communities, localities and place names located partially or completely within the township include New Bridge and West Englewood.

== Demographics ==
Historical population
Census	Pop.	Note	%±
1900	768		—
1910	2,082		171.1%
1920	4,192		101.3%
1930	16,513		293.9%
1940	25,275		53.1%
1950	33,772		33.6%
1960	42,085		24.6%
1970	42,355		0.6%
1980	39,007		−7.9%
1990	37,825		−3.0%
2000	39,260		3.8%
2010	39,776		1.3%
2020	41,246		3.7%
2023 (est.)	41,697		1.1%
Population sources: 1900–1920 1900–1910; 1910–1930 1900–2020; 2000 2010 2020

English is the sole home language of 72.4% of residents. Over a quarter of residents speak other languages, including Spanish (14.5%), Tagalog (2.3%), Urdu (1.8%), Korean (1.0%), and Polish (1.0%).

A 2001 study under the Berman Jewish DataBank estimated the number of Jewish households in the 07666 ZIP code of Teaneck to comprise 16.5% of the total. In 2018, the number of Jewish residents in Teaneck was estimated to be about 15,000 out of a total population of 36,000-37,000. A large segment of this population in Teaneck and neighboring Bergenfield is comprised of Modern Orthodox Jews.

=== 2020 census ===
Teaneck township, Bergen County, New Jersey – Racial and ethnic composition Note: the US Census treats Hispanic/Latino as an ethnic category. This table excludes Latinos from the racial categories and assigns them to a separate category. Hispanics/Latinos may be of any race.
Race / Ethnicity (NH = Non-Hispanic)	Pop 1990	Pop 2000	Pop 2010	Pop 2020	% 1990	% 2000	% 2010	% 2020
White alone (NH)	23,677	20,237	18,346	16,845	62.60%	51.55%	46.10%	40.75%
Black or African American alone (NH)	9,573	10,905	10,266	9,180	25.31%	27.78%	25.81%	22.26%
Native American or Alaska Native alone (NH)	53	39	47	46	0.14%	0.10%	0.12%	0.11%
Asian alone (NH)	2,075	2,791	3,574	4,378	5.49%	7.11%	8.98%	10.61%
Native Hawaiian or Pacific Islander alone (NH)	N/A	7	21	8	N/A	0.02%	0.05%	0.02%
Other race alone (NH)	74	154	150	590	0.20%	0.39%	0.38%	1.43%
Mixed race or Multiracial (NH)	N/A	1,024	797	1,351	N/A	2.61%	2.00%	3.28%
Hispanic or Latino (any race)	2,373	4,103	6,575	8,848	6.27%	10.45%	16.53%	21.44%
Total	37,825	39,260	39,776	41,246	100.00%	100.00%	100.00%	100.00%

=== 2010 census ===
The 2010 United States census counted 39,776 people, 13,470 households, and 10,129 families in the township. The population density was 6,622.2 per square mile (2,556.8/km^{2}). There were 14,024 housing units at an average density of 2,334.8 per square mile (901.5/km^{2}). The racial makeup was 53.33% (21,214) White, 27.69% (11,013) Black or African American, 0.28% (113) Native American, 9.11% (3,622) Asian, 0.06% (25) Pacific Islander, 6.04% (2,403) from other races, and 3.48% (1,386) from two or more races. Hispanic or Latino residents of any race were 16.53% (6,575) of the population.

Of the 13,470 households, 34.1% had children under the age of 18; 58.0% were married couples living together; 13.4% had a female householder with no husband present and 24.8% were non-families. Of all households, 20.8% were made up of individuals and 10.5% had someone living alone who was 65 years of age or older. The average household size was 2.88 and the average family size was 3.37.

25.0% of the population was under the age of 18, 9.4% was from 18 to 24, 23.1% from 25 to 44, 27.7% from 45 to 64, and 14.8% was 65 years of age or older. The median age was 39.3 years. For every 100 females, the population had 89.0 males. For every 100 females ages 18 and older there were 84.7 males.

The Census Bureau's 2006–2010 American Community Survey showed that (in 2010 inflation-adjusted dollars) median household income was $92,107 (with a margin of error of +/− $3,556) and the median family income was $108,777 (+/− $5,024). Males had a median income of $74,055 (+/− $5,587) versus $54,959 (+/− $4,129) for females. The per capita income for the township was $42,335 (+/− $2,061). About 5.7% of families and 6.9% of the population were below the poverty line, including 8.9% of those under age 18 and 7.2% of those age 65 or over.

Same-sex couples headed 126 households in 2010, an increase from the 80 counted in 2000.

=== 2000 census ===
As of the 2000 United States census, there were 39,260 people, 13,418 households, and 10,076 families residing in the township. The population density was 6,486.2 inhabitants per square mile (2,504.3/km^{2}). There were 13,719 housing units at an average density of 2,266.5 per square mile (875.1/km^{2}). The racial makeup of the township was 56.3% White, 28.8% African American, 0.2% Native American, 7.1% Asian, <0.1% Pacific Islander, 4.2% from other races, and 3.5% from two or more races. Hispanic or Latino residents of any race were 10.5% of the population.

There were 13,418 households, out of which 34.9% had children under the age of 18 living with them, 59.3% were married couples living together, 12.3% had a female householder with no husband present, and 24.9% were non-families. 21.2% of all households were made up of individuals, and 10.5% had someone living alone who was 65 years of age or older. The average household size was 2.86 and the average family size was 3.34.

The population distribution was 25.8% under the age of 18, 8.5% from 18 to 24, 26.1% from 25 to 44, 25.3% from 45 to 64, and 14.2% who were 65 years of age or older. The median age was 38 years. For every 100 females there were 89.9 males. For every 100 females age 18 and over, there were 84.9 males.

The median income for a household in the township was $74,903, and the median income for a family was $84,791. Males had a median income of $53,327 versus $40,085 for females. The per capita income for the township was $32,212. About 2.4% of families and 4.2% of the population were below the poverty line, including 3.7% of those under age 18 and 6.7% of those age 65 or over.

Ancestry information reported in the 2000 Census reflects the diversity of Teaneck residents, with no single country accounting for more than a small fraction of the population. Residents listed Italian (6.2%), German (6.0%), Russian (5.3%), Irish (5.1%) and Polish (4.2%) as the most common countries of ancestry, and an additional 4.3% listed United States. 6.3% of residents identified themselves as being of West Indian ancestry, of which 3.4% were from Jamaica.

=== Historical population ===
After its founding as a township, Teaneck saw rapid growth in its population during the first half of the 20th century. As Teaneck changed from a sparsely populated rural area into a suburb, particularly after development of property that had been part of the Phelps Estate started in the late 1920s, Teaneck's population grew rapidly, far outpacing the growth of Bergen County.

After World War II, the 1950 Census showed growth in Teaneck (33.6%) pacing Bergen County overall (31.6%). Starting in 1960, a substantial decline in the rate of growth compared to Bergen County occurred as Teaneck reached the limits of developable land, and the township neared its peak population. Population growth in the 1970 Census was small, but positive, with Teaneck reaching its historical maximum of 42,355. Absolute declines in population followed in both the 1980 (−7.9%) and 1990 (−3.0%) data. The 2000 Census showed recovery in Teaneck's population to 39,260, though growth (3.8%) was smaller than in Bergen County overall (7.1%).

With almost no land left to develop for housing, Teaneck's population is likely to remain stable for the foreseeable future. A reluctance to permit high-rise development as a means to increase population density also places a limit on growth. Changes in family size and the possibility of zoning changes to allow denser construction are some of the few influences that may affect population over time.

=== Crime ===
According to the FBI's 2016 Uniform Crime Report, there were 497 crimes in the township in 2016 (vs. 490 in 2015), of which 72 were violent crimes (vs. 50 in 2015) and 425 non-violent crimes (440 in 2015). The 2016 total crime rate per thousand residents was 12.1 (vs. 12.0 in 2015). The violent crime rate per thousand residents for the State New Jersey was 2.2 and the non-violent crime rate 10.4.

Gang violence hit Teaneck in July 2006 with the death of Ricky Lee Smith Jr., a teenager shot outside a house party by a member of the Bloods gang who had attended the party. In June 2007, the Township Council approved the hiring of five additional officers after the Chief of Police had requested the addition of 14 new officers to Teaneck's existing 98-member police force to establish a gang unit.

Teaneck has received attention in the media due to sexual crimes committed against minors by New Jersey educators. Joseph White, former principal of Teaneck High School, pleaded guilty to official child endangerment in June 2006 and was sentenced to one year in prison. White had been charged in 2002 with fondling a 17-year-old student and was subsequently acquitted. James Darden, an award-winning former eighth grade teacher at Thomas Jefferson Middle School, was charged with sexual assault and misconduct in June 2007. He pleaded guilty in December 2007 to a charge of aggravated sexual assault. In 2008, James Darden was sentenced to eight years in prison, after admitting to having a two-year sexual relationship with a student that started when she was 13. In 2018 another incident took place: A substitute teacher was charged with sexual assault. He was ordered to surrender his teacher's license and was sentenced to probation.

The December 1975 murder of Jean Diggs and her four children has never been solved. Police reported in 1977 that they had been unable to identify a perpetrator after two years and thousands of hours spent investigating the crime.

A pair of killings hit Teaneck in 2010, with council watcher Joan Davis and software engineer Robert Cantor both killed in their homes, in cases that had not been solved in more than a year after the incidents. A conviction for the murder of Robert Cantor was made in 2015.

Based on a data analysis of 18 years, it is estimated that crime will continue to decline. In 2016, the city's crime rate was 55.76% lower than the national average of violent crime and 28.3% lower than New Jersey's crime rate. The crime rate in Teaneck Township was 57.79% lower than the national property crime average and 33.03% lower than the property crime rate in New Jersey.

== Economy ==
Major institutions in Teaneck include Holy Name Medical Center and the Metropolitan Campus of Fairleigh Dickinson University, the largest private university in the state. The Teaneck Armory is the home of the New Jersey National Guard's 50th Main Support Battalion.

Cognizant Technology Solutions, a major multinational provider of high-technology services, maintains its global headquarters operations in Teaneck, located in the Glenpointe Centre, Teaneck's largest single group of commercial ratable entities, which includes a 350-room Marriott Hotel and 650,000 square feet (60,000 m^{2}) of Class A office space, as well as the headquarters of Phibro Animal Health, at the intersection of Interstate 95 and Interstate 80.

Teaneck has four main commercial districts: Cedar Lane, north Teaneck Road, West Englewood Avenue/The Plaza and Queen Anne Road/DeGraw Avenue. Cedar Lane underwent a $3.9 million Streetscape project, completed in 2006, designed to attract additional business to the area through new sidewalk paving with brick edging, bump-outs to allow easier pedestrian crossing, old-fashioned lamp posts and street plantings.

The Givaudan Fragrances Corporation Creative Fragrances Centre, a division of Givaudan, was constructed in 1972 from a design by Der Scutt, architect of the Trump Tower. Givaudan Roure vacated the building in 2009 and the facility was acquired by World of Wings, which renovated the building for use as a butterfly exhibition aimed at families. World of Wings closed in November 2016 and, in June 2019, reopened as an apartment complex called Avalon Teaneck.

== Arts and culture ==
The Puffin Foundation and its Puffin Cultural Forum have been leading supporters and producers of art in Teaneck, sponsoring plays and art exhibitions at its location on Puffin Way.

Teaneck is home to the Ethical Culture Society of Bergen County, founded in 1953. The Bergen Society is a member organization of the American Ethical Union.

The Teaneck Community Band presents a series of outdoor band concerts at the Votee Park Bandshell each summer. The 69th annual series, in 2013, was sponsored by the Puffin Foundation.

2013–2014 marked the 78th season of the Bergen Philharmonic Orchestra, which performed in the auditorium of Benjamin Franklin Middle School, having been founded in 1938 as the Teaneck Symphony Orchestra.

The now defunct Teaneck Cultural Arts Coalition had organized many community-wide cultural events, including an annual First Night community celebration of the arts held for several years through New Year's 2005.

The Garage Theatre Group, Bergen County's first non-profit professional theatre company, stages fully professional productions, with members of Actors Equity, as well as youth conservatory productions at the Becton Theatre on the campus of Fairleigh Dickinson University.

Teaneck New Theatre, founded in 1986, performs productions at St. Mark's Church in Teaneck and at the Hackensack Cultural Arts Center.

Black Box Studios is a theater group based in Congregation Beth Shalom, that has a relationship with the Bergen PAC in Englewood. The actors are mostly children and teens ages 10–16, with a 7–9 year old workshop, and an adult workshop. There are two to three performances presented in the first two or three weeks of January, and the first two weeks of June. Drama and musical theatre summer camps are offered.

Teaneck Cinemas had been the township's lone movie theater, and had also hosted live performances on its stage by local performance groups, until it closed its doors in November 2012, with theater operator Majestic Entertainment citing costs that could run to as much as $500,000 to modernize the projection systems on all four screens to use digital technology rather than 35mm reels of film. New owner Matthew Latten signed a lease in April 2013 and undertook extensive renovations that included new seating, modern digital projection systems and digital signage. After hosting the Teaneck International Film Festival in November, the reopening of the renamed Teaneck Cinemas was delayed until December 2013, with added time needed to complete the work needed to add modern features and conveniences while retaining the Art Deco character of a theater first constructed in 1937. For a number of years, the theater was main venue for screenings for Hoboken International Film Festival. The Northeast Film Festival, also takes place at Teaneck Cinemas.

Teaneck has been the site of many films, including The Family Man, the 2000 film starring Nicolas Cage, and Armageddon Time, the 2022 film starring Anthony Hopkins, Anne Hathaway and Jeremy Strong. The Teaneck Armory has been used for films including Sweet and Lowdown, and for interior scenes of You've Got Mail.

The music video for Bon Jovi's 2025 single "Red, White, and Jersey" features multiple Teaneck locations on Cedar Lane, including Teaneck Cinemas, Cedar Market, and Lark Street Music.

In 2007, two non-fiction volumes appeared dealing, inter alia, with Teaneck's Orthodox Jewish community. In Foreskin's Lament, writer Shalom Auslander describes living in Teaneck and finding the Jewish community stifling and claustrophobic. In contrast, Rifka Rosenwein, in Life in the Present Tense, describes the close-knit community as a gift she could not imagine when living in Manhattan.

The African American music group The Isley Brothers founded T-Neck Records, named for their base in the township. Other musicians from the township include Phoebe Snow, the rock band The Wrens and rappers DMX and The Notorious B.I.G.

== Sports ==
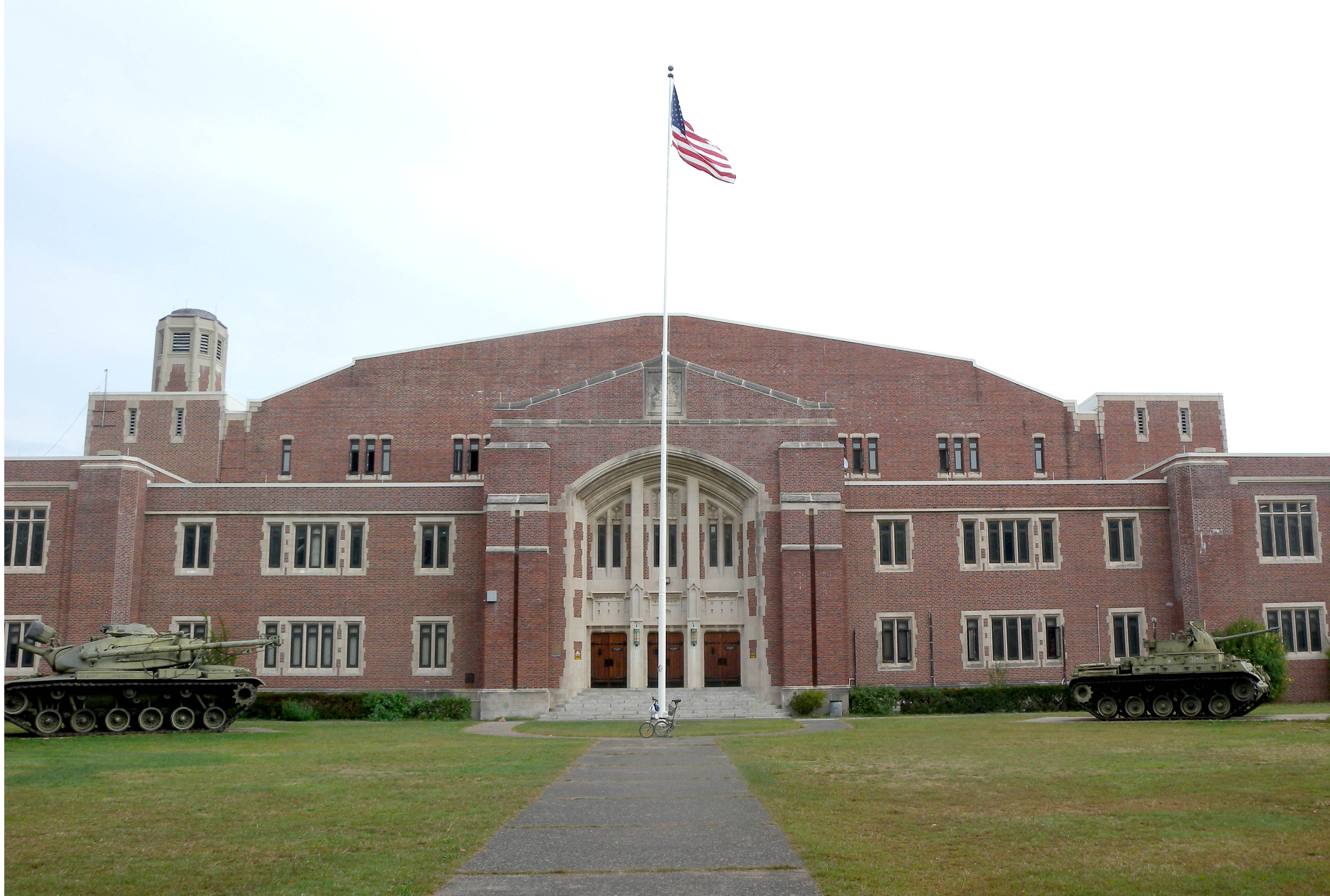
Teaneck Armory

The Brooklyn Nets professional basketball team was founded as the New Jersey Americans in Teaneck for the 1967–1968 season, as charter members of the American Basketball Association. The team played their home games at the Teaneck Armory for that one season, and was scheduled to play a one-game playoff at the armory. However, the circus had been booked for the week, and the game was relocated to a court in Commack, New York that was unplayable, and the game had to be forfeited. After the one season in Teaneck, the team relocated to Long Island and was renamed the New York Nets. Following the Long Island run, the Nets moved back to New Jersey in 1977 to be named as the New Jersey Nets until 2012, when they moved back to New York and became the Brooklyn Nets.

In 1977, Teaneck hosted the "Junior Biddy National Basketball Tournament" with American teams from as far as Dallas, Texas attending and an international one from Puerto Rico. The tournament championship was won by a team from New Orleans, Louisiana.

Portions of Fairleigh Dickinson University's Metropolitan Campus are located in Teaneck, with most of the school's athletic facilities located across the river in Hackensack. The school's University Stadium, home for its men's and women's soccer teams, lies on the Hackensack River, just north of Route 4. The 1,100-seat stadium has hosted NCAA Men's Soccer Tournament games in recent years. The natural grass field was resurfaced with FieldTurf in 2004.

The Naimoli Family Baseball Complex is situated between Route 4 and University Stadium. Fairleigh Dickinson received a $1 million bequest from FDU alumnus Vince Naimoli, founding owner of the Tampa Bay Rays, to establish a 500-seat stadium with artificial turf and lighting on the site of the current facility.

== Parks and recreation ==
Teaneck has 24 municipal parks, of which 14 are developed. Votee Park, the township's largest, covers 40.51 acres (16.39 ha), surrounded by Queen Anne Road, Palisade Avenue, Court Street and Colonial Court. Including baseball fields, soccer fields, playgrounds and the township's inground swimming facility, the park was renamed in honor of former mayor Milton Votee in 1958. A Sportsplex was opened at the southern end of Votee Park in 2014, which includes two synthetic turf full-size soccer fields, one of which is also lined for use for football.

The Friends of the Hackensack River Greenway Through Teaneck work to preserve and develop the 3.5-mile (5.6 km) greenway along the Hackensack River from Terhune Park at the Bogota border in the south north to Brett Park on the New Milford border, encouraging the growth of native plants and providing a verdant area along the river for residents and visitors. A series of 16 laminated signs were created by Teaneck artist Richard Mills along the Greenway, depicting details of history and the flora and fauna of the river in a series called "Hackensack River Stories" that was installed in 2000. The Greenway in Teaneck became the fourth National Recreation Trail in the state when it received the designation by the United States Department of the Interior at ceremonies held in Brett Park in June 2009.

Established in 2001 in conjunction with the Puffin Foundation, the Teaneck Creek Conservancy has restored a plot of degraded land east of Teaneck Road near the intersection of Interstates 80 and 95, removing decades of debris and creating a network of 1.3 miles (2.1 km) of trails.

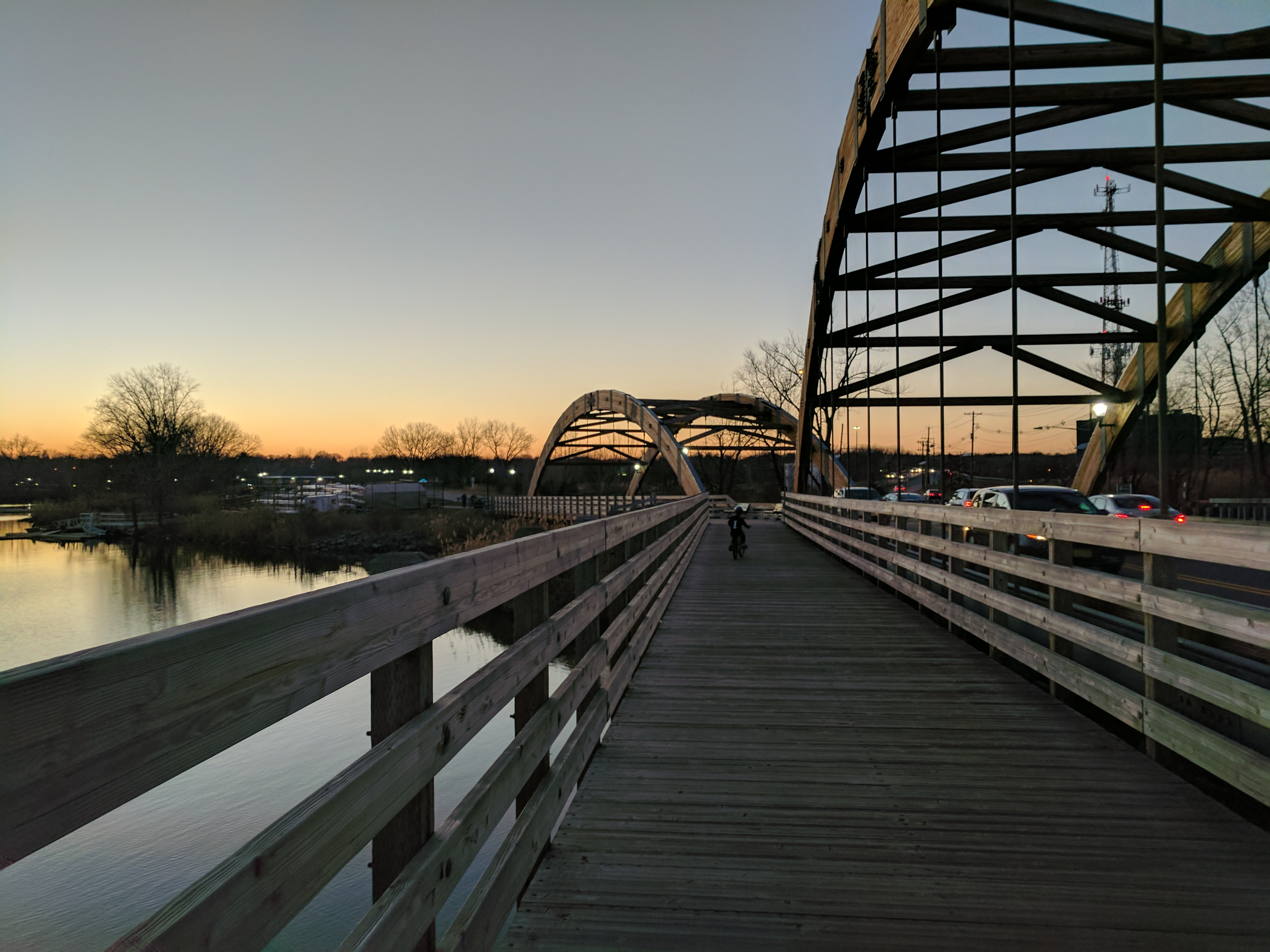
Overpeck's pedestrian bridge

Overpeck County Park, along the shores of Overpeck Creek, a tributary of the Hackensack River, is more than 800 acres (3.2 km^{2}) in size, of which about 500 were donated by Teaneck, and which is also in portions of Englewood, Leonia, Ridgefield Park, and Palisades Park.

== Government ==
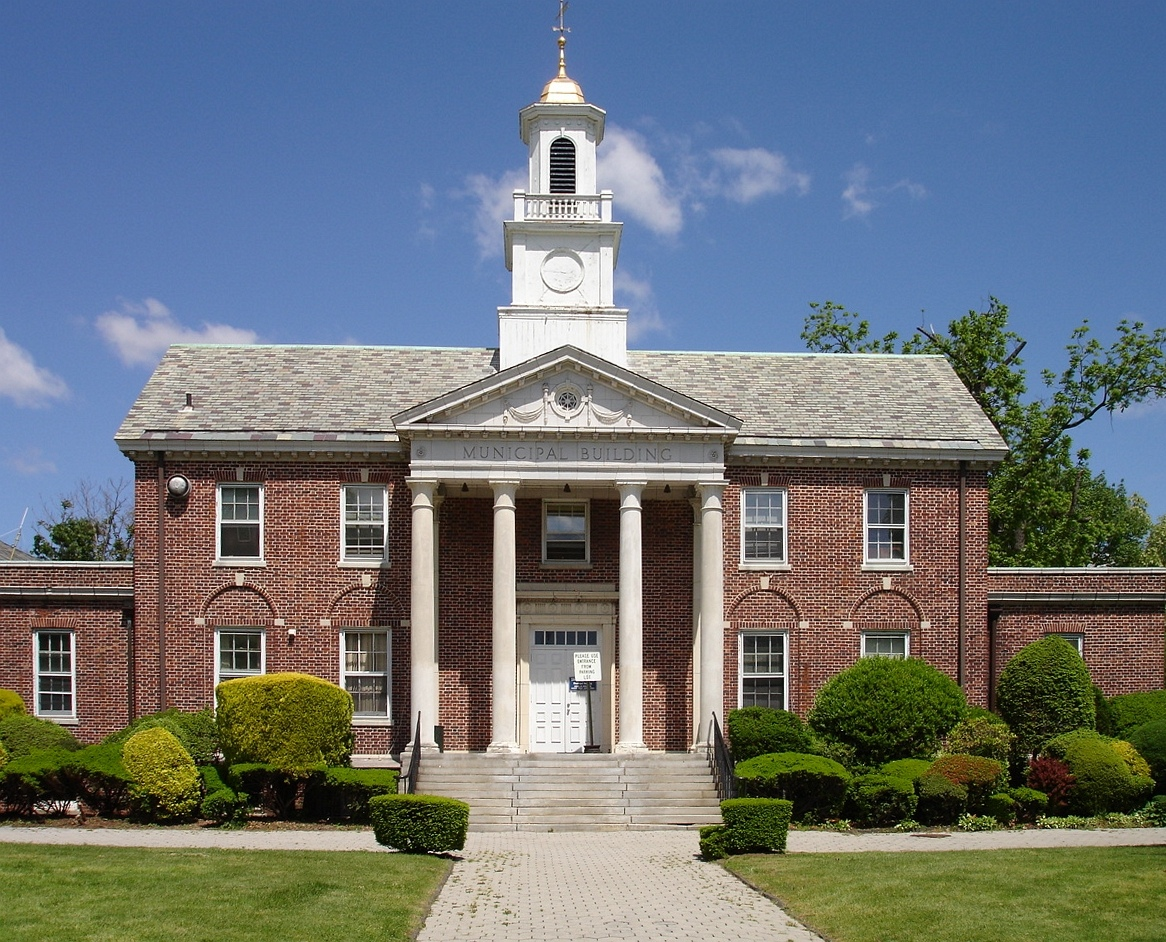
Teaneck Municipal Building

=== Local government ===
Teaneck is governed within the Faulkner Act (formally known as the Optional Municipal Charter Law) under the Council-Manager form of government. The council-manager system was adopted by referendum in 1988. The council's seven members are elected at-large in nonpartisan elections to serve staggered, four-year terms of office. Following a municipal election, the Township Council holds a Reorganization Meeting where the winners are sworn in, and the council elects a mayor and two deputy mayors from among its own members. Under the council-manager system, the mayor's chief role is to preside over the council. The mayor (and deputy mayors) vote on all matters as regular members of the council, and the position is not an executive one. The mayor does, however, execute bonds, notes, contracts and written obligations of the Township and is empowered to perform marriages.

The chief executive of the Township of Teaneck is the Township Manager, who is hired by the council and is present at meetings of the council but does not have voting power. The manager implements council policies, enforces ordinances and is responsible for appointing and directing department heads. The Township Manager is also responsible for preparing and submitting the budget to the council.

The Township Council serves as Teaneck's governing body, setting policies and passing ordinances. It adopts an annual budget and approves contracts and agreements for services. The Council appoints the town officials, including the Manager, Clerk, Auditor, Attorney, Magistrate and Assessor. The Council appoints seven members of the Planning Board, the members of the Board of Adjustment, and all other statutory and advisory boards.

As of January 2025 the Township Council was comprised as follows:

Position	Name	Term began	Term ends	Notes
Mayor	Mark J. Schwartz	January 1, 2025	December 31, 2028	Unanimous vote
Deputy Mayor 1	Karen Lew Orgen	January 1, 2025	December 31, 2028	Vote of 5–2
Deputy Mayor 2	Denise Belcher	January 1, 2023	December 31, 2026	Vote of 5–2
Councilmember	Elie Y. Katz	January 1, 2023	December 31, 2026	
Councilmember	Danielle Gee	January 1, 2023	December 31, 2026	
Councilmember	Hillary Goldberg	January 1, 2023	December 31, 2026	
Councilmember	Michael Pagan	January 1, 2025	December 31, 2028	

As of July 2024, the Township Manager is Jacklyn Hashmat.

Following its founding in 1895, Teaneck used the traditional township form of government, led by a three-member Township Committee (later expanded to five seats) elected on a partisan basis. On September 16, 1930, Teaneck residents voted to establish a non-partisan Council-Manager form of government under the terms of the 1923 Municipal Manager Law, with five members elected concurrently on an at-large basis. In 1962, the Council expanded to its current size of seven members and the position of Deputy Mayor was created. In 1987, a referendum to alter the form to a Faulkner Act Council-Manager form of government was approved, providing for staggered terms for the council. The township is one of 42 municipalities (of the 565) statewide that use this form of government.
Until 2021, council elections took place in even years on the second Tuesday in May. Following a referendum that passed in 2021, the date of Township Council elections was moved to November to be held with the state-wide elections.

In May 2000, three women ran for Township Council, and all three, incumbent Jackie Kates and newcomers Marie Warnke and Deborah Veach, were elected. Kates, Warnke and Veach completed their four-year terms and then ran for re-election in May 2004. Jackie Kates and Deborah Veach were re-elected and became Mayor and Deputy Mayor, respectively. Ms. Veach resigned her position in October 2005 and was appointed to be the Township's Municipal Prosecutor.

On May 13, 2008, the township voted to re-elect Monica Honis to the council (with 2,981 votes). Elnatan Rudolph (2,852) lost his bid for re-election, falling 38 votes behind his running mate, Mohammed Hameeduddin. Barbara Toffler (leading the voting with 3,356 votes) and Mohammed Hameeduddin (2,890) were elected and took office on July 1, 2008, filling the seats left by Rudolph and former mayor Jackie Kates, who did not run for re-election.

In the 2010 municipal elections, Adam Gussen, Elie Y. Katz and Lizette Parker were re-elected to office, with former councilmember Emil "Yitz" Stern taking the seat vacated by former mayor Kevie Feit, who did not run for a second term. At its July 1, 2010, reorganization meeting the council selected Mohammed Hameeduddin to serve as mayor, making him one of the state's first Muslim mayors, while Adam Gussen was chosen as deputy mayor.

In the May 2012 municipal election, Mohammed Hameeduddin won a second term in office (with 4,374 votes) and was the only incumbent to win re-election, with challengers Mark J. Schwartz (3,150) and Henry Pruitt (2,872) taking the seats of Dr. Barbara Ley-Toffler (2,526) and Monica Honis (2,238), who lost their bids for re-election and came in fourth and fifth respectively, while Alexander Rashin came in sixth (1,049).

In the May 2018 municipal election, Elie Y. Katz won a sixth term in office (with 3,822 votes) and Gervonn Romney Rice, who was selected to replace Mayor Lizette Parker (after her death in 2016), won reelection (with 4,480 votes). Challengers Keith Kaplan (with 3,191 votes) and James Dunleavy (with 3,360 votes) defeated incumbent Alan Sohn (with 2,483 votes) and challengers Clara Williams (with 2,303 votes) and Dr. Charles Powers (with 2,282 votes).

In the May 2020 municipal elections, Mark J. Schwartz won reelection (with 5,076 votes), with his running mates Karen Orgen (with 5,061 votes), and Michael Pagan, who was the highest vote getter (with 5,107 votes). Challengers Denise Belcher (with 4,726 votes), Ardie Walser (with 4,597 votes), and Gina Gerszberg (with 4,631 votes).

The November 2022 municipal elections were the first Municipal election held in November. The November 2022 Municipal Elections, challengers Danielle Gee (6,639), Denise Belcher (6,532), and Hillary Goldberg (6,309) defeated incumbent Keith Kaplan (with 4,747 votes), their fourth running mate Chondra Young (with 6,179 votes) came in 109 votes behind six term council member Elie Y. Katz, who won a seventh term in office (with 6,288 votes). Challenger Danielle Gee, Denise Belcher, and Hillary Goldberg also defeated Latisha Garcia (with 4,060) votes, Desiree Ramos Reiner (with 4,436 votes), and Anthony Bruno (with 1,106) votes.

In the November 2024 municipal election, incumbents Mark J. Schwartz (8,668 votes), Karen Orgen (8,701 votes), and Michael Pagan (6,853 votes) all won reelection against challengers Chondra Young (3,957 votes), Duane Harley (6,638 votes), Reshma Khan (6,621 votes), and Ardie Walser (6,061 votes).

=== Federal, state, and county representation ===
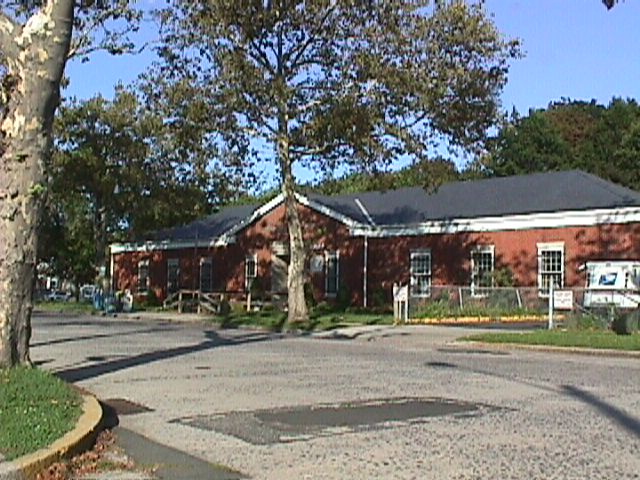
Teaneck Main Post Office

Teaneck is in the 5th Congressional District and is part of New Jersey's 37th state legislative district.

Prior to the 2010 Census, all of Teaneck had been part of the 9th Congressional District, a change made by the New Jersey Redistricting Commission that took effect in January 2013, based on the results of the November 2012 general elections, making Teaneck one of 14 municipalities (and the only one in Bergen County) to be split across districts, down from the 29 that had been split after the 2000 Census. As part of the redistricting that took effect in 2013, 32,023 (about 80%) of Teaneck residents were placed in the new 5th District, with the remaining 7,753 residents (about 20%) mostly in areas of the township east of Teaneck Road and south of Bedford Avenue placed in the 9th District.

For the 119th United States Congress, New Jersey's 5th congressional district is represented by Josh Gottheimer (D, Wyckoff). New Jersey is represented in the United States Senate by Democrats Cory Booker (Newark, term ends 2027) and Andy Kim (Moorestown, term ends 2031).

For the 2026–2027 session, the 37th legislative district of the New Jersey Legislature is represented in the New Jersey Senate by Gordon M. Johnson (D, Englewood) and in the General Assembly by Shama Haider (D, Tenafly) and Ellen Park (D, Englewood Cliffs).

Bergen County is governed by a directly elected County Executive, with legislative functions performed by a Board of County Commissioners comprised of seven members who are elected at-large to three-year terms in partisan elections on a staggered basis, with either two or three seats coming up for election each November; a Chairman and Vice Chairman are selected from among its seven members at a reorganization meeting held every January. As of 2025, the county executive is James J. Tedesco III (D, Paramus), whose four-year term of office ends December 31, 2026.

Bergen County's Commissioners are Chair Mary J. Amoroso (D, Mahwah, 2025), Vice Chair Steven A. Tanelli (D, North Arlington, 2027), Chair Pro Tem Joan Voss (D, Fort Lee, 2026), Rafael Marte (D, Bergenfield, 2026), Germaine M. Ortiz (D, Emerson, 2025), Thomas J. Sullivan Jr. (D, Montvale, 2025) and Tracy Silna Zur (D, Franklin Lakes, 2027).

Bergen County's elected constitutional officials are Clerk John S. Hogan (D, Northvale, 2026), Sheriff Anthony Cureton (D, Englewood, 2027) and Surrogate Michael R. Dressler (D, Cresskill, 2026).

=== Politics ===
United States presidential election results for Teaneck Twp 2024 2020 2016 2012 2008 2004
Year	Republican		Democratic		Third party(ies)	
Year	No.	%	No.	%	No.	%
2024	8,252	37.12%	13,277	59.73%	701	3.15%
2020	6,141	26.59%	16,737	72.48%	214	0.93%
2016	4,229	21.35%	15,053	75.98%	530	2.68%
2012	5,256	27.28%	13,875	72.01%	136	0.71%
2008	5,621	27.42%	14,785	72.12%	95	0.46%
2004	5,672	29.85%	13,254	69.74%	78	0.41%

Teaneck is a Democratic stronghold, with Democratic registration higher than that of Republicans. As of March 23, 2011, there were a total of 24,862 registered voters in Teaneck Township, of which 12,646 (50.9% vs. 31.7% countywide) were registered as Democrats, 2,332 (9.4% vs. 21.1%) were registered as Republicans and 9,872 (39.7% vs. 47.1%) were registered as Unaffiliated. There were 12 voters registered as Libertarians or Greens. Among the township's 2010 Census population, 62.5% (vs. 57.1% in Bergen County) were registered to vote, including 83.4% of those ages 18 and over (vs. 73.7% countywide).

Gubernatorial election results for Teaneck
Year	Republican		Democratic		Third party(ies)	
Year	No.	%	No.	%	No.	%
2025	6,240	36.15%	10,947	63.42%	75	0.43%
2021	3,345	25.97%	9,461	73.46%	73	0.57%
2017	1,937	18.90%	8,164	79.67%	146	1.42%
2013	4,439	41.39%	6,197	57.78%	90	0.84%
2009	3,242	24.99%	9,347	72.05%	384	2.96%
2005	2,573	20.98%	9,526	77.67%	166	1.35%

In the 2016 presidential election, Democrat Hillary Clinton received 15,053 votes (75.2% vs. 54.2% countywide), ahead of Republican Donald Trump with 4,229 votes (21.1% vs. 41.1%) and other candidates with 729 votes (3.6% vs. 4.6%), among the 20,152 ballots cast by the township's 28,631 registered voters, for a turnout of 70.4% (vs. 72.5% in Bergen County). In the 2012 presidential election, Democrat Barack Obama received 13,875 votes (71.5% vs. 54.8% countywide), ahead of Republican Mitt Romney with 5,256 votes (27.1% vs. 43.5%) and other candidates with 136 votes (0.7% vs. 0.9%), among the 19,394 ballots cast by the township's 27,145 registered voters, for a turnout of 71.4% (vs. 70.4% in Bergen County). In the 2008 presidential election, Democrat Barack Obama received 14,785 votes (71.6% vs. 53.9% countywide), ahead of Republican John McCain with 5,621 votes (27.2% vs. 44.5%) and other candidates with 95 votes (0.5% vs. 0.8%), among the 20,642 ballots cast by the township's 26,294 registered voters, for a turnout of 78.5% (vs. 76.8% in Bergen County).

In the 2013 gubernatorial election, Democrat Barbara Buono received 57.8% of the vote (6,197 cast), ahead of Republican Chris Christie with 41.4% (4,439 votes), and other candidates with 0.8% (90 votes), among the 10,991 ballots cast by the township's 25,615 registered voters (265 ballots were spoiled), for a turnout of 42.9%. In the 2009 gubernatorial election, Democrat Jon Corzine received 9,347 ballots cast (71.8% vs. 48.0% countywide), ahead of Republican Chris Christie with 3,242 votes (24.9% vs. 45.8%), Independent Chris Daggett with 343 votes (2.6% vs. 4.7%) and other candidates with 41 votes (0.3% vs. 0.5%), among the 13,027 ballots cast by the township's 25,513 registered voters, yielding a 51.1% turnout (vs. 50.0% in the county).

United States Senate election results for Teaneck1
Year	Republican		Democratic		Third party(ies)	
Year	No.	%	No.	%	No.	%
2024	6,558	32.38%	12,808	63.23%	890	4.39%
2018	3,107	20.69%	11,585	77.15%	324	2.16%
2012	3,457	19.80%	13,795	79.00%	210	1.20%
2006	3,032	23.86%	9,566	75.27%	111	0.87%

United States Senate election results for Teaneck2
Year	Republican		Democratic		Third party(ies)	
Year	No.	%	No.	%	No.	%
2020	5,824	25.78%	16,393	72.57%	371	1.64%
2014	1,911	17.15%	9,131	81.94%	102	0.92%
2013	1,537	16.90%	7,515	82.63%	43	0.47%
2008	3,761	20.25%	14,630	78.78%	180	0.97%

=== Taxation ===
The Tax Foundation determined that Bergen County had the third-highest median property tax burden in the nation ($8,708 vs. a New Jersey median of $6,579 and a national median of $1,917) and the fourth-highest level of property taxes as a percentage of median income (8.59% vs. 7.45% statewide and 3.03% nationally), based on an analysis of data from the 2009 American Community Survey conducted by the United States Census Bureau for all 792 counties in the United States with more than 20,000 residents. As of 2010, Teaneck's effective tax rate of $2.492 per $100 of equalized value was the 12th-highest of the 70 municipalities in Bergen County, which had a countywide median effective rate of $2.115 per $100, ranging from a low of $.596 in Alpine to a high of $3.005 in Ridgefield Park.

As of 2013, just under 55% of a Teaneck property owner's real estate taxes goes to support the local school system, 36.7% goes to municipal taxes (including an open space tax) and the remaining 8.4% to cover county services (which also assesses an open space tax). In the decade from 2003 to 2013, municipal taxes had risen at an annual rate of just over 4.5% and school taxes by almost 2.8%, while the consumer price index for the New York–Northern New Jersey–Long Island area had gone up 2.6% during that time span.

The 2013 tax rate was set at $2.486 per $100 of assessed value (an overall increase of 3.7% from 2012), which includes school taxes of $1.365 (up almost 3.3%), municipal taxes of $0.871 (an increase of 5.8%), a library tax of $.031 (down 3.1%) and county taxes of $0.206 (down 0.5%), plus a municipal open space tax of $0.010 and a county open space tax of $0.003 (both unchanged). The owner of a median-valued home in Teaneck, assessed at $465,300, paid 2011 property taxes of $11,190, which would include $6,244 in school taxes, $3,992 in municipal taxes and $949 to the county (including open space levies).

During 2006, Teaneck underwent a revaluation of all privately owned real estate, as required periodically by the state. This revaluation adjusted property values to market prices, ensuring that taxes are equitably allocated. The average property in Teaneck was assessed at approximately $417,900, an increase of 132.1% from the prior year's average. The new valuations took effect for the 2007 tax year. In the wake of the revaluation implemented in 2007, a wave of tax appeals hit the township, resulting in a loss of about $110 million in ratables and costs to the township of $2.2 million for the 2012 tax year. The township agreed to complete a revaluation by October 2014 that would go into effect in 2015, awarding a $710,000 contract to perform the necessary home visits and determine property values.

The Teaneck Public Schools had a Budgetary Per Pupil Cost of $18,417 in its 2012–2013 budget, 26.8% higher than the average of $14,519 budgeted that year by districts in the same grouping of grades and enrollment, ranked as the 101st highest among the 106 K–12 districts in the state with more than 3,500 students.

At the April 2006 school elections, voters rejected the proposed $84.8 million budget for the Teaneck Public Schools for the 2006–2007 school year by a 1,644 to 1,336 margin. Based on recommendations specified by the Township Council, the Board of Education approved $544,391 in cuts. The school budget was rejected again in 2009, with the Council cutting $1 million from the $94.8 million originally proposed. After the 2010 school budget failed, the Township Council removed $6.1 million from the $95 million budget proposed by the school district, zeroing out what would have been an 8.2% increase in the school tax levy. The school board eliminated 77 positions to meet the cuts approved by the council.

== Education ==
=== Public schools ===
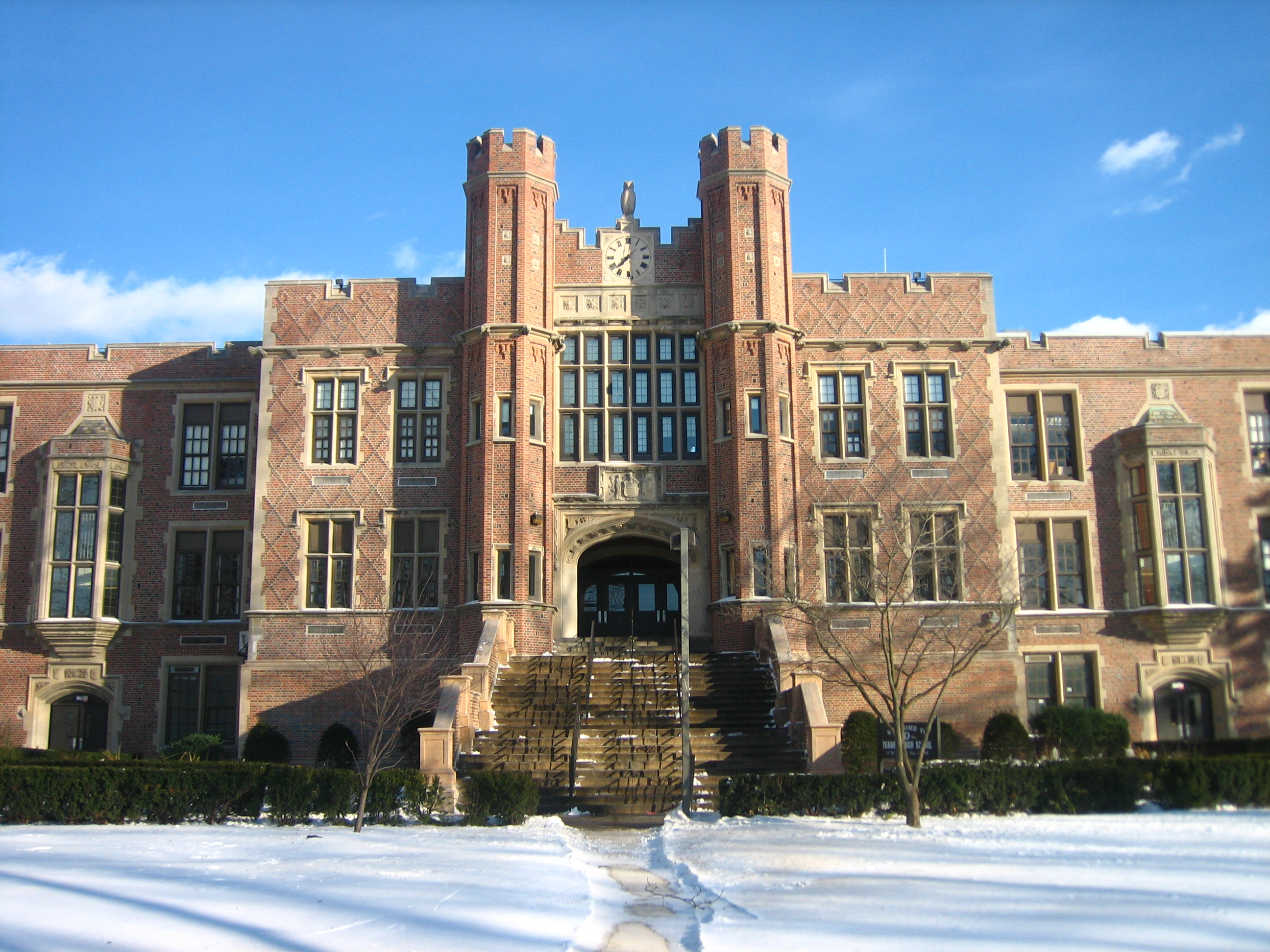
Teaneck High School

The Teaneck Public Schools serves students in pre-kindergarten through twelfth grade. As of the 2023–24 school year, the district, comprised of eight schools, had an enrollment of 3,487 students and 305.2 classroom teachers (on an FTE basis), for a student–teacher ratio of 11.4:1. Schools in the district, with 2023–24 enrollment data from the National Center for Education Statistics, are Bryant Elementary School with 265 students in PreK and Kindergarten, Theodora Smiley Lacey Elementary School with 134 students in PreK and Kindergarten, Hawthorne Elementary School with 324 students in grades K–4, Lowell Elementary School with 305 students in grades K–4, Whittier Elementary School with 373 students in grades K–4, Benjamin Franklin Middle School with 485 students in grades 5–8, Thomas Jefferson Middle School with 525 students in grades 5–8 and Teaneck High School with 1,261 students in grades 9–12.

Longfellow Elementary school was closed in 1998. Other elementary schools that closed prior to 1998 included Emerson and Eugene Field School, which had been used by the Board of Education for its central administrative offices until 2020, when it reopened as Theodora Smiley Lacey School with room for 180 kindergarten students.

2011–2012 total spending for the district was $91,382,911, a Total Spending per Pupil of $22,894 based on 3,991.6 students, ranking 96th highest of the 106 K–12 districts statewide with more than 3,500 students, with the average district spending $18,047 per pupil. Based on the 2012–2013 budget, the district planned to spend a Budgetary Per Pupil Cost of $18,417 (a measure that excludes out-of-district tuition payments for special education, transportation costs, legal judgments and certain other expenditures), ranking 101st highest among its grouping of districts, compared to a statewide average of $14,519. Of the 2012–2013 Budgetary Per Pupil Cost, $11,394 per student was allocated to classroom instruction (104th highest of K–12 districts in the state with more than 3,500 students, with a statewide average of $8,588), $3,012 per student to Total Support Services (ranked 96th, average of $2,338), $1,662 to Total Administrative Costs (ranked 93rd, average of $1,448) and $2,031 to Total Operations and Maintenance of Plant (ranked 89th, average of $1,787). The district's 2012–2013 Median Classroom Teacher Salary of $77,614 is ranked 98th in the state in its grouping, the Median Support Service Salary was $92,539 (97th), while the Median Administrator Salary was $140,497 (95th).

As of the 2010 No Child Left Behind (NCLB) Report, Teaneck High School had satisfied the Adequate Yearly Progress measure and had a graduation rate of 97.0% for the class of 2009–2010, compared to a statewide average of 94.7%. On the High School Proficiency Assessment (HSPA), 9.4% were partial proficient, 79.5% proficient and 11.1% advanced proficient in Language Arts Literacy (vs. statewide averages of 10.3% partial, 75.7% proficient and 14% advanced). In Mathematics, 24.8% were partial proficient, 61.8% proficient and 13.4% advanced proficient (vs. statewide averages of 18.4% partial, 57.9% proficient and 23.7% advanced).

The Teaneck Community Charter School (TCCS) had a 2017–2018 enrollment of 322 students and 25.9 classroom teachers (on an FTE basis), for a student–teacher ratio of 12.4:1. TCCS is a charter school that operates independently of the Teaneck Public Schools under a charter granted by the Commissioner of the New Jersey Department of Education, which was renewed for five years in 2012. Admission is open to the public for available slots (after returning students and siblings of existing students are entered) and offers an after school program and summer camp. As the school is a public school, no tuition is charged. Funding comes from the Teaneck Public Schools (and the home districts of non-resident students), which provides 90% of its cost per pupil in the district; the balance of funding comes directly from the state of New Jersey. The school moved to a new building at 563 Chestnut Avenue in the 2009–2010 school year, from a space it had rented on Palisade Avenue.

2009–2010 total spending for the TCCS was $5,050,613, a Total Spending per Pupil of $16,614 based on 304 students, ranking 51st highest of the 77 charter schools statewide, with the average district spending $17,836 per pupil. Based on the 2010–2011 budget, the TCCS planned to spend a Budgetary Per Pupil Cost of $14,210, ranking 54th highest among the 77 districts, compared to a statewide average of $13,609. Of the 2010–2011 Budgetary Per Pupil Cost, $8,112 per student went to classroom instruction (57th highest of charter schools in the state, with a statewide average of $8,004), $1,124 per student to Total Support Services (ranked 14th, average of $2,116), $1,690 to Total Administrative Costs (ranked 4th, average of $1,453) and $3,282 to Total Operations and Maintenance of Plant (ranked 70th, average of $1,698). The district's 2010–2011 Median Classroom Teacher Salary of $55,860 is ranked 57th in the state in its grouping, the Median Support Service Salary is $82,433 (54th), while the Median Administrator Salary is $103,750 (56th).

Public school students from the township, and all of Bergen County, are eligible to attend the secondary education programs offered by the Bergen County Technical Schools, which include the Bergen County Academies in Hackensack, and the Bergen Tech campus in Teterboro or Paramus. The district offers programs on a shared-time or full-time basis, with admission based on a selective application process and tuition covered by the student's home school district.

The 2017–2018 total spending for the district was $101,642,004, a Total Spending per Pupil of $27,670.

=== Private schools ===
Teaneck is home to the Metropolitan Campus of Fairleigh Dickinson University, which straddles the Hackensack River in Teaneck and Hackensack. The campus served 4,114 undergraduates and 2,350 graduate students.

Teaneck is also home to four private Orthodox Jewish day schools and/or high schools. Those schools include Torah Academy of Bergen County (for boys in grades 9–12) which completed an $8 million expansion project at the start of the 2013–2014 school year that doubled the size of the school, adding new classrooms and an additional gym to accommodate the record enrollment of 293 students, with room for expansion for the several years ahead. The SINAI Special Needs Institute, a school specializing in the education of students with learning disabilities and other special needs, is hosted in the same building. Ma'ayanot Yeshiva High School, located on the same section of Palisade Avenue, serves girls in grades 9–12. In 2016, Yeshivat He'atid, a private K–8 Jewish day school, moved from Bergenfield to Teaneck, taking over an empty data center building near TABC and Ma'ayanot. The school employs a blended learning model. With enrollment growing from 116 to 600 students in under a decade, the school began an expansion project in 2021. Yeshivas Heichal HaTorah, another high school, opened in September 2013 at the Teaneck Jewish Center with an initial enrollment of 17 students. A post high school program, called Yeshivas Bais Mordechai (and formerly called Yeshiva Gedolah of Teaneck), opened in 2005 on Palisade Avenue.

The Community School is a private school, founded in 1968 to serve the bright child with learning and attentional disabilities. Both the lower school and high school are in Teaneck.

Teaneck was home to the Metropolitan Schechter High School, a co-ed Conservative Jewish high school, which closed its doors in August 2007 due to fundraising problems.

Al-Ghazaly High School, a co-ed religious day school for seventh through twelfth grades founded in 1984, was located on 441 North Street, serving the Muslim community from the greater Teaneck area. The school relocated to a larger facility in Wayne and opened its doors to students in September 2013, with the Teaneck facility repurposed to serve students in pre-Kindergarten through eighth grade with the name of Academy of Greatness and Excellence, which is also an Islamic school.

== Media ==
WVNJ AM-1160 (licensed to Oakland, New Jersey) maintains studios at 1086 Teaneck Road. WFDU FM-89.1 operates from studios at Fairleigh Dickinson University, and there was a defunct AM Carrier Current version of WFDU on 640 through some time in the 1980s.

== Public services ==
The Richard Rodda Community Center, located near Route 4 at the south end of Votee Park, is a 50,900-square-foot (4,730 m^{2}) community and recreation center completed in 1998. The facility includes two full sized gyms, a dance studio, a kitchen and several multipurpose rooms. The Teaneck Recreation Department offers educational, sports and arts programs throughout the year. The Rodda Center is home to the Senior Citizens Service Center, which offers educational and fitness activities for adults ages 55 and up, and serves hot lunch daily, provided by the Bergen County Division of Senior Services.

=== Police and law enforcement ===
The Teaneck Police Department had 96 sworn officers in 2012, in addition to 13 civilian employees, three parking enforcement officers and 25 school crossing guards out of a total of 106 authorized uniformed positions. Robert Wilson was named Chief as of July 2008, filling the acting chief role previously held by Deputy Chief Fred Ahearn, who had been serving in that position after the departure of Paul Tiernan in 2007. The department hired its first two officers in 1914; Freddie Greene, its first African-American officer, joined the department on September 15, 1962, and its first female officer began serving on January 4, 1981. In 1990, a Teaneck officer fatally shot Phillip Pannell, an armed African American man with his hands raised above his head while facing away from the officer. In 2012, the Teaneck Police Department received accreditation from the Commission on Accreditation for Law Enforcement Agencies (CALEA), following a two-year-long process that documented the department's compliance with 112 standards established by the organization as best practices. The department became the ninth in the state to receive CALEA accreditation.

=== Fire department ===
The Teaneck Fire Department was established in 1915, making it one of the oldest in the county.

=== Medical ===
The Teaneck Volunteer Ambulance Corps (TVAC) was created in 1939 to serve the residents of Teaneck. TVAC has always been Teaneck's only emergency ambulance service and includes over 100 volunteers and five ambulances.

Holy Name Medical Center is a fully accredited, not-for-profit community hospital. Founded and sponsored by the Sisters of St. Joseph of Peace in 1925, the hospital has grown to become a comprehensive 361-bed medical center. Affiliation with NewYork-Presbyterian Healthcare System further brings the advantages of large urban hospitals to the community, with access to clinical trials and expanded education for its physicians. Holy Name Medical Center has undertaken an ambitious effort to provide comprehensive health care services to underinsured and uninsured Korean patients from a wide area with its growing "Korean Medical Program", including attracting 1,500 people to its annual seventh annual Korean health fair in 2014. To accommodate the township's Orthodox Jewish community, the hospital offers a Shabbat elevator, a room prepared for families of patients staying at the hospital during Shabbat and Jewish holidays, as well as a lounge offering kosher food.

== Transportation ==
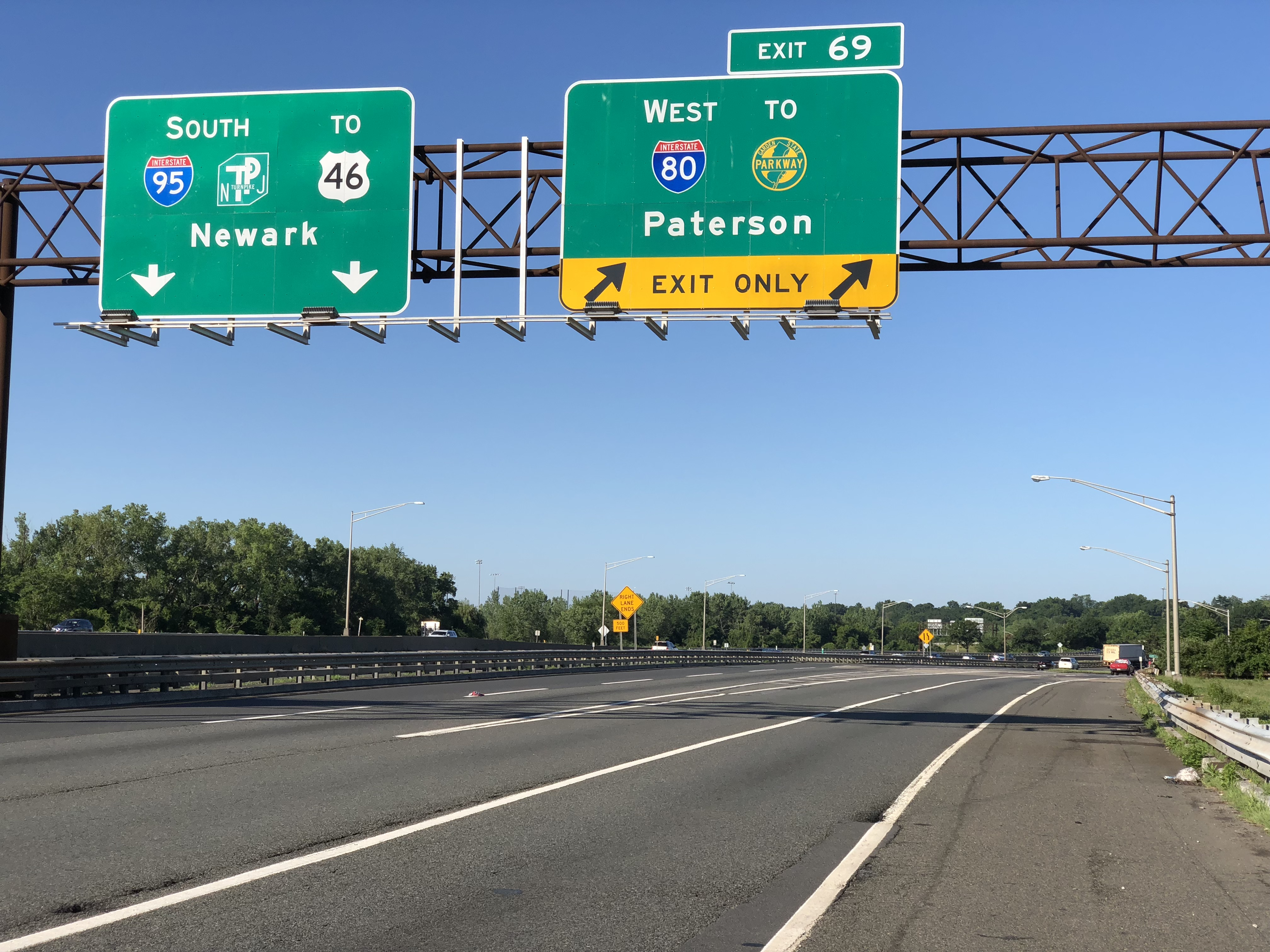
View south along I-95 at the junction with I-80 in Teaneck

=== Roads and highways ===
As of May 2010, the township had a total of 119.41 miles (192.17 km) of roadways, of which 103.95 miles (167.29 km) were maintained by the municipality, 10.70 miles (17.22 km) by Bergen County, 3.47 miles (5.58 km) by the New Jersey Department of Transportation, and 1.29 miles (2.08 km) by the New Jersey Turnpike Authority.

Teaneck is situated along a number of major transportation routes, including the New Jersey Turnpike (a portion of Interstate 95). It is known for being the eastern endpoint of Interstate 80, which stretches west to San Francisco since the dedication of a segment in Salt Lake City on August 22, 1986, marking the completion of the first transcontinental portion of the Interstate Highway System. As the second-longest Interstate route, the highway stretches nearly coast-to-coast for 2,899.54 miles (4,666.36 km), shorter than only Interstate 90. The easternmost 0.9 miles (1.4 km) of Interstate 80 runs from Bogota to the junction with Interstate 95.

NJ Route 4 traverses east–west through Teaneck, running 2.5 miles (4.0 km) from Hackensack to Englewood. Unlike all other municipalities situated along the highway, there is no commercial development or billboards, with the open space along the highway maintained by the Township Council's Preserve the Greenbelt Committee. Route 4 narrows from three lanes in each direction on a section between Belle Avenue and Englewood, causing rush-hour traffic backups that may extend for miles. The New Jersey Department of Transportation (NJDOT) has discussed a series of proposed replacement projects for bridges over the highway, pending completion of feasibility studies and design work. While the township has indicated its willingness to cede space along the Greenbelt for a third lane, the lack of space for a shoulder may preclude the creation of a full three-lane route through Teaneck. In November 2013, NJDOT informed Teaneck officials that it had no plans to widen the highway, as the need to focus the limited funds available on replacing and repairing deteriorating bridges and infrastructure precluded the implementation of a widening project.

Interstate 95 heads north for 1.3 miles (2.1 km) through Teaneck from Ridgefield Park to Leonia. New Jersey's other main trunk route, the Garden State Parkway, can be reached just a few miles west of Teaneck. Access to New York City is available for motorists by way of the George Washington Bridge in Fort Lee (via Route 4 or Interstate 95), or through the Lincoln Tunnel in Hudson County (via the NJ Turnpike) into Midtown Manhattan.

County roads in Teaneck include Teaneck Road, Queen Anne Road, River Road and Fort Lee Road. Cedar Lane, another county road, crosses the Hackensack River and connects to Hackensack over the Anderson Street Bridge.

=== Public transportation ===
NJ Transit bus service is available in Teaneck, with frequent service on Teaneck Road, Route 4 and Cedar Lane, and less-frequent service on other main streets. NJ Transit bus service is offered to the Port Authority Bus Terminal in Midtown Manhattan on the 155, 157, 165R, 167 and 168 routes; to the George Washington Bridge Bus Station in Upper Manhattan on the 171, 175, 178, 182 and 186 routes; and to other New Jersey communities served on the 83, 751, 753, 755, 756, 772 and 780 routes. Scheduled bus service is also available from Rockland Coaches to the Port Authority Bus Terminal, 11T/11AT from Stony Point, New York. Spanish Transportation and several other operators provide frequent jitney service along Route 4 between Paterson, New Jersey and the George Washington Bridge Bus Station.

While there is currently no passenger train operation in Teaneck, train service is available across the Hackensack River at the New Bridge Landing station in River Edge and at the Anderson Street station in Hackensack. NJTransit's Pascack Valley Line runs north–south to Hoboken Terminal, with connections to the PATH train from the Hoboken PATH station, and with NJT connecting service to Penn Station in Midtown Manhattan via the Secaucus Junction transfer station. At Hoboken Terminal, connections are also available to NY Waterway ferry service (to the World Financial Center and other destinations) and to the Hudson-Bergen Light Rail system (serving locations along the Hudson River in Hudson County).

Teaneck is split east and west by railroad tracks, which currently provide freight service by CSX Transportation. Until 1959, passenger train service was provided on these same tracks by the West Shore Railroad, with Teaneck stations at Cedar Lane and West Englewood Avenue. Commuter service was available from these stations, with 44 passenger trains operating daily to and from Weehawken, where Hudson River ferry service was available to New York City at 42nd Street and at the Financial District in Lower Manhattan. Train service from Teaneck was also available north to Albany, along the west shore of the river. Efforts are ongoing to restore some passenger train service on this line for commuters heading toward New York City, including extension of the Hudson-Bergen Light Rail service via the Northern Branch to Englewood or Tenafly.

Teaneck's closest airport in New Jersey with scheduled passenger service is Newark Liberty International Airport, 20 miles (32 km) away (about 27 minutes) in Newark / Elizabeth. New York City's LaGuardia Airport is 15 miles (24 km) away in Flushing, Queens via the George Washington Bridge, an estimated 22 minutes in ideal conditions. John F. Kennedy International Airport in Queens is 26 miles (42 km) and 34 minutes from Teaneck. Teterboro Airport offers general aviation service, and is a 9-mile (14 km) drive (about 13 minutes).

== Sources ==
- Municipal Incorporations of the State of New Jersey (according to Counties) prepared by the Division of Local Government, Department of the Treasury (New Jersey); December 1, 1958.
- Clayton, W. Woodford; and Nelson, William. History of Bergen and Passaic Counties, New Jersey, with Biographical Sketches of Many of its Pioneers and Prominent Men., Philadelphia: Everts and Peck, 1882.
- Damerell, Reginald G. Triumph in a White Suburb: The Dramatic Story of Teaneck, New Jersey, the First Town in the Nation to Vote for Integrated Schools, W. Morrow, 1968
- Harvey, Cornelius Burnham (ed.), Genealogical History of Hudson and Bergen Counties, New Jersey. New York: New Jersey Genealogical Publishing Co., 1900.
- Kelly, Mike. Color Lines: The Troubled Dreams of Racial Harmony in an American Town, Morrow, 1995. ISBN 9780688117955.
- Van Valen, James M. History of Bergen County, New Jersey. New York: New Jersey Publishing and Engraving Co., 1900.
- Westervelt, Frances A. (Frances Augusta), 1858–1942, History of Bergen County, New Jersey, 1630–1923, Lewis Historical Publishing Company, 1923.
