= The Vets =

American veterinary services company

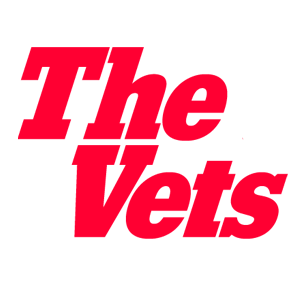
- Company type: Private
- Industry: Veterinary medicine company
- Founded: 2020
- Defunct: 2025
- Headquarters: United States
- Services: full diagnostics, blood workup, capturing vitals, wellness exams, vaccinations, lab tests, microchipping
- Website: http://www.thevets.com/

The Vets was an American veterinary services company that specialized in providing at-home veterinary care, primarily for cats and dogs. Founded in Miami in 2020 by Shmuel Chafets and Dori Fussmann, the company worked in 19 locations within the United States. The company ceased operations in July 2025.

== History ==
The Vets was established on January 1, 2020, in Miami, Florida, by co-founders Shmuel Chafets and Dori Fussmann.

On July 1, 2020, the company completed a pre-seed round with $8 million in funding, with Target Global as the lead investor. On January 27, 2022, The Vets closed a seed round, raising $40 million led by Bolt Ventures, Pico Venture Partners, and Target Global etc. In January 2022, The Vets expanded its operations to the East Coast of the United States.

In August 2023, The Vets supported "Petcare for Seniors" program in Tampa, within "Stress-Free Sundays" helping senior in taking care of their pets.

In July 2025, the company ceased operations, notifying staff of this via email before cancelling all existing appointments and no longer accepting new bookings.

== Overview ==
The primary focus of The Vets was the provision of veterinary services, within clients' homes, to minimize the typical stress associated with veterinary clinic visits.

The Vets, headquartered in the US, worked in 19 locations across the country, including Miami, Tampa, Dallas, Austin, Houston, Chicago, Denver, Portland, Phoenix, Raleigh, Columbus, Orlando, Los Angeles, San Diego, San Antonio, Sacramento, Charlotte, Las Vegas, and Seattle, Colorado Springs. Visits include comprehensive diagnostics such as blood workups, assessment of vital signs, wellness examinations, vaccinations, laboratory testing, microchipping, and other essential veterinary procedures.
