= Verona station (Erie Railroad) =

Former railway station in New Jersey, US

Verona
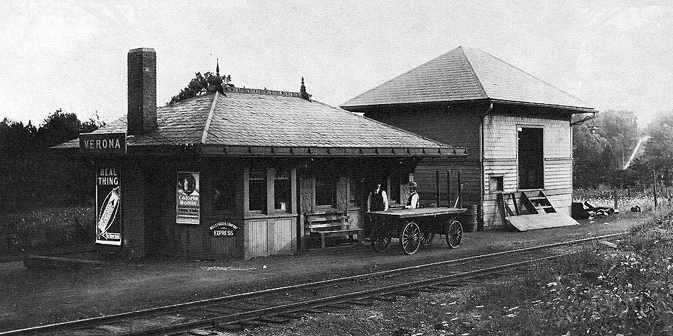
- The Verona station as viewed in 1909, four years after the station from Caldwell was moved to Verona for use. The still-standing freight depot is present.

General information
- Location: 62 Depot Street, Verona, New Jersey
- Coordinates: 40°50′15″N 74°15′09″W
- Line: Caldwell Branch
- Platforms: 1 side platform
- Tracks: 2

Construction
- Platform levels: 1

Other information
- Station code: 1753

History
- Opened: June 20, 1891 (formal opening); July 4, 1891 (passenger opening)
- Closed: September 30, 1966
- Rebuilt: 1905, 1962

Key dates
- January 7, 1905: First depot caught fire
- April 1, 1962: Second depot caught fire

Former services
| Preceding station | Erie Railroad | Following station |
|---|---|---|
| Caldwell toward Essex Fells | Caldwell Branch | Overbrook toward Great Notch |
Location

Verona is a defunct commuter railroad station in the eponymous township of Verona, Essex County, New Jersey. Located at the junction of Depot and Personette Streets, the station serviced trains of the Erie Railroad's New York and Greenwood Lake Division Caldwell Branch between Great Notch in Little Falls and Essex Fells, where connection was made to the Morristown and Erie Railway. The station contained a single side platform during its existence. The next station towards Great Notch was Cedar Grove while the next station towards Essex Fells was Caldwell.

Rail service in the Verona section of Caldwell Township began with the opening of the Caldwell Branch on July 4, 1891 between Great Notch and Caldwell stations. Service to Essex Fells began in 1892. The original station depot built at Verona by the railroad burned on January 9, 1905 in a fire that destroyed it and the freight house attached. Due to the loss of the structure, Erie Railroad crews moved the original station depot at Caldwell to Verona in February 1905. The replacement depot itself burned on April 1, 1962 due to an electrical fire and was replaced by a three-sided shelter. The Erie Lackawanna Railroad ended passenger service between Great Notch and Essex Fells on September 30, 1966 as part of multiple service cuts.

Verona station would retain freight service until a washout in 1975 eliminated the tracks over the Peckman River. The branch would sit dormant until being officially abandoned in 1979 and the portion between Verona and Great Notch would become the West Essex Trail. To date, the former freight station and baggage shed is one of two remaining extant Caldwell Branch station structures, the other being the original Essex Fells depot, which was converted into a house.

== History ==
=== Interest and construction (1885–1891) ===
An interest by the Baltimore and Ohio Railroad, Delaware, Lackawanna and Western Railroad and Erie Railroad in the late 1880s led to the demand for a branch to Caldwell Township. In 1885, a report came from the Baltimore and Ohio's headquarters in Chicago, Illinois that the railroad wanted to build a new line between New York City and Chicago. This new line would cut through Essex and Morris Counties, cutting through Verona, Caldwell, Hanover and other places without a competing railroad. Any construction would require going through Orange Mountain of the Watchung Mountains.

The Delaware, Lackawanna and Western Railroad first showed their interest in the winter of 1884–1885. Interested in a route to Mendham, New Jersey, they surveyed several routes to reach it, including a line that would go via Montclair, Caldwell and Morristown. Plans for this route would result in replacing the Boonton Branch as the primary route for long distance, freight and mail trains, as executives felt that it would save time reaching Hoboken compared to the existing branch. This also included a four-track bridge being built at Morristown. While executives did inspections of the proposed route via Mendham, officials from the Erie Railroad offered locals in Morristown incentives to choose them for the construction of a line to the city via Caldwell, using their New York and Greenwood Lake Railway line as a starting point for a new service.

By September 1888, the Delaware, Lackawanna and Western had its crews out working near Glen Ridge on a new double track line on the railroad's branch to Montclair, which would also facilitate the extension to Caldwell. However, construction stopped on any extension to Caldwell, resulting in local anger at the Delaware, Lackawanna and Western by January 1889. Locals felt that the Lackawanna was genuinely uninterested in the opinions of Caldwell and Verona residents, putting the ones of New York City ahead of the locals. On the other hand, the operators of the Erie Railroad and the Greenwood Lake Railroad had interest from the public, offering to purchase the right-of-way and pay for the rest of construction and operation of the new line. The expectation though was that the Greenwood Lake branch line would run via Cedar Grove Center and cross Bloomfield Avenue (County Route 506), then follow the continuation of their original surveys. The Lackawanna returned to do more surveying from Montclair to Caldwell on the line by the end of March 1889. At the same time, surveyors from the Pennsylvania Railroad also arrived to inspect their proposed route. This one would involve cutting off at Watchung Avenue station and going along the Watchung Mountains into Caldwell.

However, by August, it became clear that the Erie Railroad would be the most likely railroad to construct a line to Caldwell. In late July 1889, reports noted that the railroad was considering a new line from Rockaway via Parsippany and Montclair, where it would met up with the Greenwood Lake Railroad. At the Rockaway end, the railroad would connet to the Dover and Rockaway Railroad and the Jersey Central Railroad's Hopatcong Branch, creating a connection to Lake Hopatcong. The proposal would also include an arrangement of a lease to operate Erie Railroad trains on those lines. In February 1890, locals in Caldwell decided to go forward with the plans outlined by the Erie Railroad, noting that they were fed up with the Lackawanna. This new branch would cost $75,000 for construction and that locals would fundraise and build it then turn over operation to the Erie after construction was complete. Upon completion, four trains would operate on the branch (two in each direction). This contract was a reflection of the Erie Railroad's genuine interest in the area over the Lackawanna's disinterest. By March 27, locals already raised $54,000 (1890 USD) and they decided that they would no longer pursue the interest of the Lackawanna, putting their final support behind the Erie design.

By early May 1890, the total reached $57,000 and surveyors began designing the route from Caldwell to Cedar Grove, staking the final design. With signs of progress in place, real estate in Verona boomed, with land along Grove Avenue and Bloomfield Avenue were selling quickly. Local farmers sold out at high prices to allow construction of residences along the future railroad line.

Despite the agreement, the Erie Railroad backed out of the existing agreement around August 1890. Instead, the people raising the money and beginning construction announced that they would look at operating the railroad themselves. They also noted that the eastern terminus of the new branch would be at Great Notch station in Little Falls rather than at Cedar Grove Center. By September 1890, the residents had raised $68,000 in susbcriptions of the needed $75,000. However, at that point, the railroad announced that they would not hold up their end of the bargain until the last $7,500 was paid. They also requested that the railroad would keep ownership and paid the $68,000 and that anyone who had not given their money step up and give it to them. At the same time, the Lackawanna re-entered the fray with an interest in a line to Great Notch to meet with the branch via the Boonton Branch. Locals rejected any expectation that they would actually go forward with the proposal. Residents appointed a committee to attain the final $7,000 on September 11, 1890.

In October 1890, construction on the new line to Caldwell and Verona began under control of the fundraising stockholders. The connection to the New York and Greenwood Lake Railroad would remain at Great Notch station, but the stockholders would instead operate their own railroad and lease options for connecting services. The first contract, awarded by a local who moved from Philadelphia, Pennsylvania, resulted construction beginning in Verona near a local mill pond. The railroad company ordered 1,000,000 pounds (450,000 kg) of steel from the Scranton Steel Works, which would represent 4.5 miles (7.2 km) of the new line, installed by around 100 workers. However, despite progress in construction of the new rail line, delays came in purchasing land for the new property. Edwin Taylor, a resident of Cedar Grove, asked for more money on his land than the stockholders would offer for the property. A local magistrate appointed a commission to sort the mess out, with two residents of East Orange and one from Montclair. This commission would come up with a value of the property and the damages for the parts of land taken for the railroad.

Construction came to a grinding halt in December 1890 when a fight broke out between the contractors involved in the project, C. W. Leavitt of the railroad company and his subcontractor, John Ross. They disagreed over how the project was being operated and with a construction deadline of April 1, 1891, time was running out. An accident on Pompton Turnpike by Taylor due to the incomplete grade crossings led to higher emotions among local residents, who demanded the disagreement be worked out. Construction did restart by April 1891, and a preliminary announcement was that the first train would run by Decoration Day. Around 1-mile (1.6 km) of track was laid by the railroad company at the beginning of May 1891. Construction of the line reached Bloomfield Avenue in Verona on May 15 and Caldwell on May 16, but noted that the planned Decoration Day deadline would not be met. All track was in place by May 23, and work on ballasting the line was underway.

The first passenger train on the railroad came on June 20, 1891, with executives from the railroad company on board to inspect the new line. A meeting would be held on July 2, 1891 to accept the property officially from the contractor and the first regular passenger train would be scheduled for July 4 with heavy fanfare planned.

=== Erie ownership and first station fire (1892–1905) ===
The introduction of passenger and freight service on the Caldwell Railroad led to increased growth immediately for the railroad and the communities around it. Early growth was steady by December 1891. As part of the growth, the Erie Railroad acquired the Caldwell Railroad in January 1892, making changes to continue further growth along the line. By June 1892, the line averaged 15–20 passengers per operating day, along with increased freight service.

The original depot built at Verona burned to the ground on the afternoon of January 7, 1905. The station agent, Frank Fisher, spotted the fire when the chair he was sitting on was in the process of burning, along with the smell of burning odor of cloth in the building. After rushing out of his office, he went to alert authorities about the fire. Due to the lack of a fire department in Verona, nobody could save the wooden station depot, which burned in its entirety with all the documents and money inside. A detective estimated the damage of the depot at $10,000. However, the cause of the fire was considered suspicious. Fisher had told locals at the boarding house in which he lived that he had failed to make payroll for his staff at the station and spent multiple nights going over his books multiple times. The residents of the boarding house also stated that he had hired a couple locals to work on the account balance issues. Fisher also received a $150 from the American Bronze Company for services rendered and that it was also burned in the fire. After telling the officials about the loss, he stated that he was going to Nanuet, New York to be with friends rather than remain in the area.

With the destruction of the station, the railroad moved quick to replace the depot. With nearby Caldwell station having gained a new depot in 1904, the old station had become the freight house. Rather than continue to use the structure as a freight house, the railroad decided to move the structure with runners pulled by horseback. Taking advantage of a snow-covered day in February 1905, the railroad had 12 horses move the structure along Bloomfield Avenue to the station in Verona. This new depot for Verona was a Queen Anne-style building with slate roof and shingling on its siding. It contained an oak desk and a cast iron potbelly stove in the depot.

Pending an investigation, the railroad would move Fisher's assignment to Midvale station in Passaic County rather than fire him. Fisher, fresh off a wedding the week prior with a lady he met in Canada, was once again under investigation. The Erie Railroad had begun an investigation on his finances at the Midvale station. E. A. Wiggins, a traveling auditor for the railroad, visited Fisher at Midvale station on April 4, 1905 for classified reasons, stating that the problems at Verona had been a settled matter and that his visit was unrelated. After the interview, the railroad requested police come recover the missing money.

Fearing to have to disclose more financial losses for the railroad, Fisher went to his boarding house in Midvale around noon, he went to his room and took a revolver to his brain, committing suicide instantly. The smoking revolver near Fisher's body and his lifeless body confirmed his death at age 26. His wife was in shock and others called a doctor, but the physician could not do anything as Fisher was already deceased. The Passaic County Physician made their investigation that day and declared it a suicide. However, the shock of the suicide led to concern his newlywed widow would not survive. An investigation noted that the losses at Midvale were minimal, as Fisher's books for the months of January and February 1905 were correct. They believed that the losses were recent in nature and that it occurred around the time the investigation was underway. The railroad added that Fisher was not held liable for what happened in Verona and would have been in line for a promotion within the company due to his loyalty.

=== Second station fire and replacement fight (1961–1962) ===
In December 1961, the Erie-Lackawanna Railroad asked First Marketing Company of Newark to sell the station depot at Verona. As part of the sale, the station depot would be maintained and operated by the new owner. This would not change if the depot was replaced with a new structure. The railroad also offered to lease the station from whatever party chose to purchase the station, saving them money on taxes and maintenance. The company did not offer a starting price for a potential purchase, but the deal added that the railroad would maintain 200 square feet (19 m^{2}) of the station with the platform and street access to continue rail service. By this point, the railroad had been operating two morning trains and three evening trains at Verona station.

The company offered the municipality the first chance to purchase the station depot, showing interest but not making any official deal. The railroad paid taxes to the municipality of $1,000 (1962 USD) but with no line item of which pays for the depot. The municipality made an official offer of $1 for the station, an option that the Erie-Lackawanna turned down. A representative of First Marketing stated that multiple offers were made after an article appeared in the Verona–Cedar Grove Times and that the railroad intended to get the full value of the structure. However, the Council noted in a previous meeting that the borough had no value to the municipality and that was why the offer was small. If negotiations failed with Verona, the building would be offered on the open market to anyone willing to pay the value.

No sale had been made before the station depot caught fire on the morning of April 1, 1962. Defective electrical wiring was to blame for the fire, which caused the interior to burn around 12:40 a.m. Police officials were in the area just minutes before and the railroad stated that nobody had been in the structure since the afternoon of March 30. Firefighters put out the blaze quickly and kept the fire from spreading to the wooden freight house next to the burning passenger depot. No railroad service was affected by the blaze. The fire caused destruction to the signal equipment and various pieces of electric equipment on the branch along with old records in the attic. At the time of the fire, the station agent had been dealing with the freight sales for Overbrook Hospital. All that remained of the depot was the charred walls.

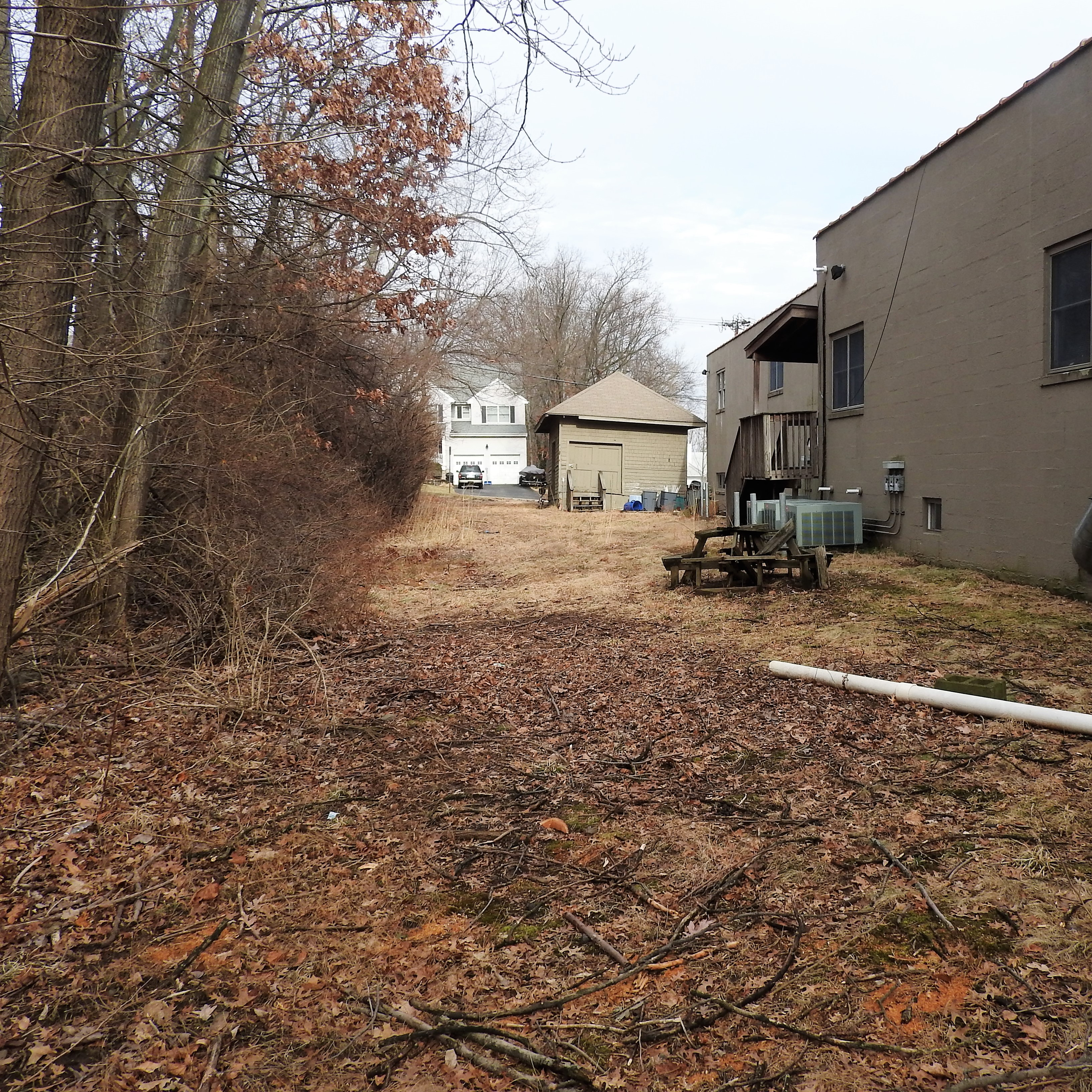
The former right-of-way of the Caldwell Branch and the Verona freight station

The railroad made a quick decision to request the Board of Public Utility Commissioners to abandon the station at Verona. The Order of Railroad Telegraphers and its local union immediately went to protest this decision, requesting that the borough defend the retaining of a station structure and agent at Verona. The chair of the local union stated that abandoning the agent services at Verona would be a mistake due to inconveniencing riders and damage value of nearby property. They added that the first quarter of 1962 had shown an increase in revenue generated at Verona of 15% and that the total of revenu for 1961 was $214,057 between passenger and freight services. Passenger ridership in 1962 averaged about 50. Closure of the station would require people to drive to Caldwell station to get tickets or obtain them at Hoboken Terminal. Freight services would also have to be moved to Caldwell. The Borough Council tabled any action on May 1 at their meeting, but some commuters who showed to the meeting voiced their support for action. One local resident suggested that the borough eliminate all property taxes from a new structure to pressure the Erie-Lackawanna Railroad to build a new station.

Verona agreed to back up the union in July 1962 with Mayor Robert Howe asking the Borough Attorney, Fred Slickel III to attend a July 16 hearing of the Board of Public Utility Commissioners. Councilman Anthony Ditri supported the commuters after the hearing in May. The railroad in return offered to build a shelter at Verona and move all freight services to Caldwell station. At the hearing on July 16, Ditri and Assistant Borough Attorney Emil Mascia attended for the borough of Verona. Mascia stated that the removal of an agent would adversely affect commuters and local development in Verona. Mascia added that the borough had a pending amendment to their zoning statute that would bring further growth to the area with the railroad maintaining a physical presence. He also added that the shelter would be considered a nuisance and that extra policing would be required to monitor a station shelter. The Erie Railroad disagreed, stating that the freight revenue had gone up while passenger usage had gone down. The Board ordered the railroad to come up with shelter plans for them to review and adjourned the meeting to July 30.

The Public Utilities Commission agreed with the railroad in December 1962 that the station would be replaced by a shelter and not a full building with an agent. Ditri told the Borough Council that the station would be a three-sided steel shelter and riders would have to purchase tickets on the train rather than from an agent. Councilman Richard Sandler added that he opposed the shelter as it was proposed and that the municipality should talk to the building inspector about finding out how much discretion the borough had in the shelter design. Sandler added that a two-sided shelter would be better and require less policing than the three-sided shelter. Ditri added that the railroad shelter would look similar to the one built in Cedar Grove and considered undesirable.

=== End of passenger service (1965–1966) ===
Commuters in the West Essex area of the county, including Verona, offered in September 1965 to adjust declining ridership on the Caldwell Branch with reduction to pair of express trains that would only stop at Essex Fells, Caldwell, Verona, Cedar Grove and Great Notch before heading direct to Hoboken Terminal. The morning train would leave Essex Fells at 7:30 a.m. and the evening train would leave Hoboken Terminal at 5:30 p.m. These would be operated on self-propelled units. The New Jersey State Highway Commission proposed instead a rail bus to Montclair, eliminating service on the railroad branch, but making stops. A committee of commuters reached out to Dwight R.G. Palmer, the State Highway Commissioner about their support of the express trains over a bus to Montclair. A survey of 132 people was given to commuters and of the first 60 that resulted in a majority of demand for the express trains. They also added that a committee should be formed to push for their opinions on the subject. Over 80% of the first set of surveys also supported their idea of the express trains over the Montclair bus. Those surveyed were also invited to attend a meeting on October 1, 1965 in Caldwell to form a committee.

The new group, the West Essex Commuters Association, came into existence to help vocalize the interests of the commuters along the branch. By December 1965, talk of the proposed Montclair shuttle subsided and the organization pushed to commuters that they need to consider that the proposal would be worse than the express rail option. Using the previous experience of a rail bus that replaced the Erie's Orange Branch, they noted that the bus caused further decline of ridership in the area. The organization added that railroad issues affect all forms of transportation and not just the passenger train ridership. They also asked for details from the state of New Jersey about a demonstration project that would end service on the Caldwell Branch attached to a federal grant of $6 million. They announced a meeting for January 20, 1966 on the back of Governor Richard J. Hughes to help focus on opposing the rail bus to Montclair. An early estimate was that the service would take 16 months to implement.

Despite the pressure, The Board of Public Utility Commissioners approved the Erie Lackawanna Railroad's request to discontinue service on the Caldwell Branch effective June 1, 1966. This order would be part of a greater service cuts of trains on multiple lines of the Erie Lackawanna Railroad, affecting about 3,000 passengers on the system. The four trains on the Caldwell Branch were averaging 664 passengers per day. This would cut $2 million in operating costs, which had $159,087 in revenue in 1965. However, the Board of Public Utilities Commissioners reversed their decision in late May 1966 pending a decision to reform the entire network being discussed by the state of New Jersey. As a result of the announcement, the service on the Caldwell Branch (and all other lines) would be extended two more months and new timetables would be announced.

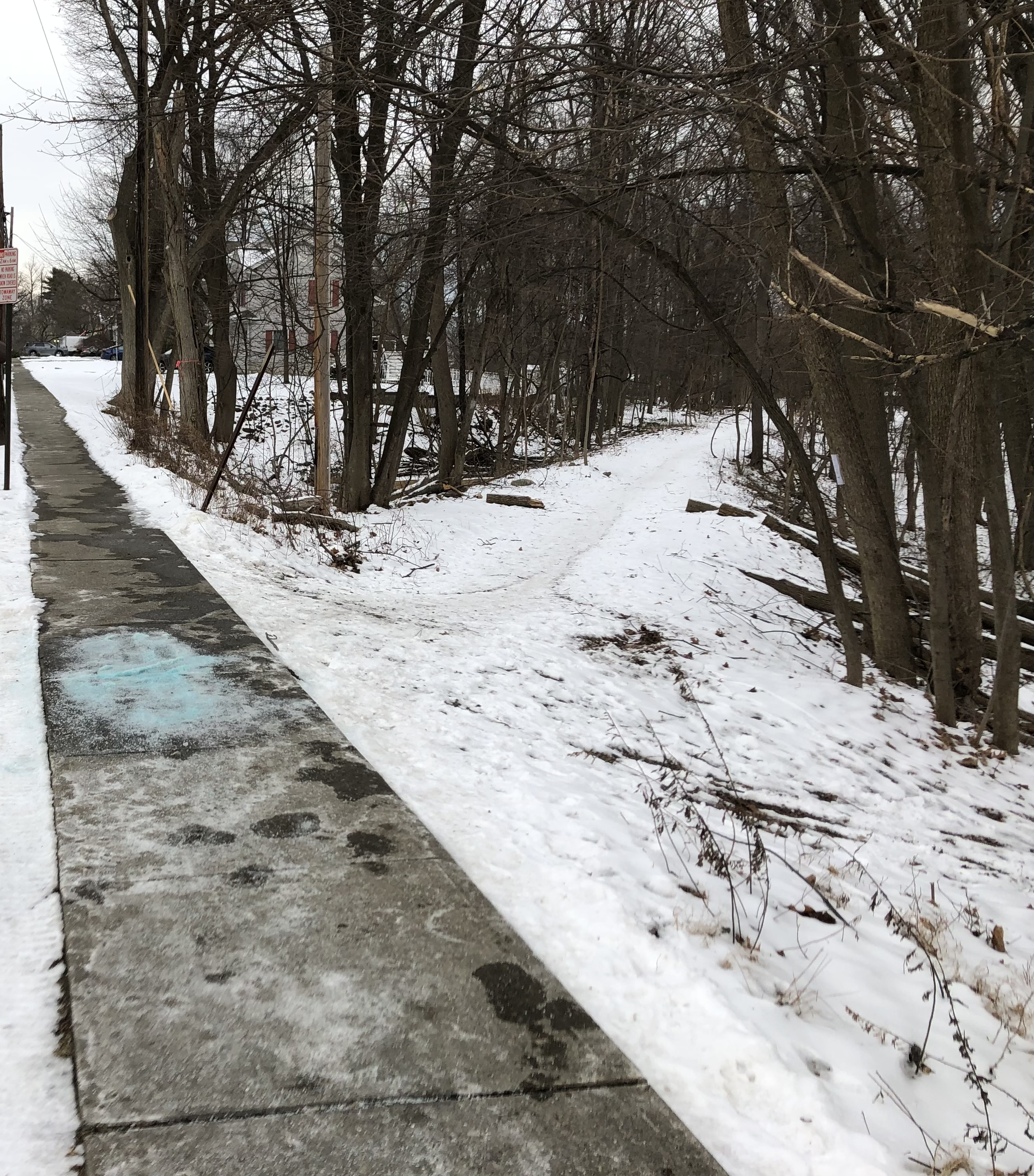
The southern terminus of the West Essex Trail

On September 8, the Public Utilities Commissioners reversed that decision and announced that the Erie Lackawanna could cut services as originally planned in May 1966. Despite a failed appeal to the Appellate Division of the New Jersey Superior Court by Morris County and several local municipalities, the order went through on September 30, 1966. As part of the failed appeal, service on the Newark, Carlton Hill, Northern and Caldwell branches would all be cut in its entirety. The judges stated that cutting the service was necessary for the greater good of the people compared to those affected by the railroad cuts. The announcement was that services would end as of 2:00 a.m. October 3, 1966.

=== Track removal and freight station preservation (1975–2013) ===
Parts of the Caldwell Branch right-of-way suffered washouts in 1975 after flooding. In August 1976, the New Jersey Department of Transportation (NJDOT) and the Morristown and Erie Railway made an agreement to have the latter take over the out-of-service railroad branch for use of freight services. With six freight customers the former Erie Lackawanna Railroad operated on the line, the new services would return a complete connection from Essex Fells to Great Notch. The branch would be rehabilitated to return to active service and reconstruction would have to be done on the line to eliminate damage caused by the washouts. NJDOT expected the line to reopen by March 1977, but the Morristown and Erie expected that the line would open sooner than that.

However, no progress on the project was made and by April 1978, the Sierra Club chapter in New Jersey asked the Essex County Park Commission to look at purchasing the railroad right-of-way for a new bicycle path. This would involve a 37-mile (60 km) long path from Newark to Millburn. In 1979, the mayor of Verona, Jerome Greco, and the mayor of Caldwell, David Dancy, worked on a plan to convert the right-of-way into a trail. Both requested funding from the county to purchase the right-of-way and develop it. In June 1979, the Southern Salvage Company began dismantling the right-of-way of all the tracks, which would sold as scrap iron. Erie County Executive Peter Shapiro and the Sierra Club toured the right-of-way and part of nearby powerlines for the Lenape Trail during a 10-mile (16 km) walk. The bike path would involve 10 acres (4.0 ha) in Verona and that all structures were good shape except for the former washout sites near Overbrook Hospital.

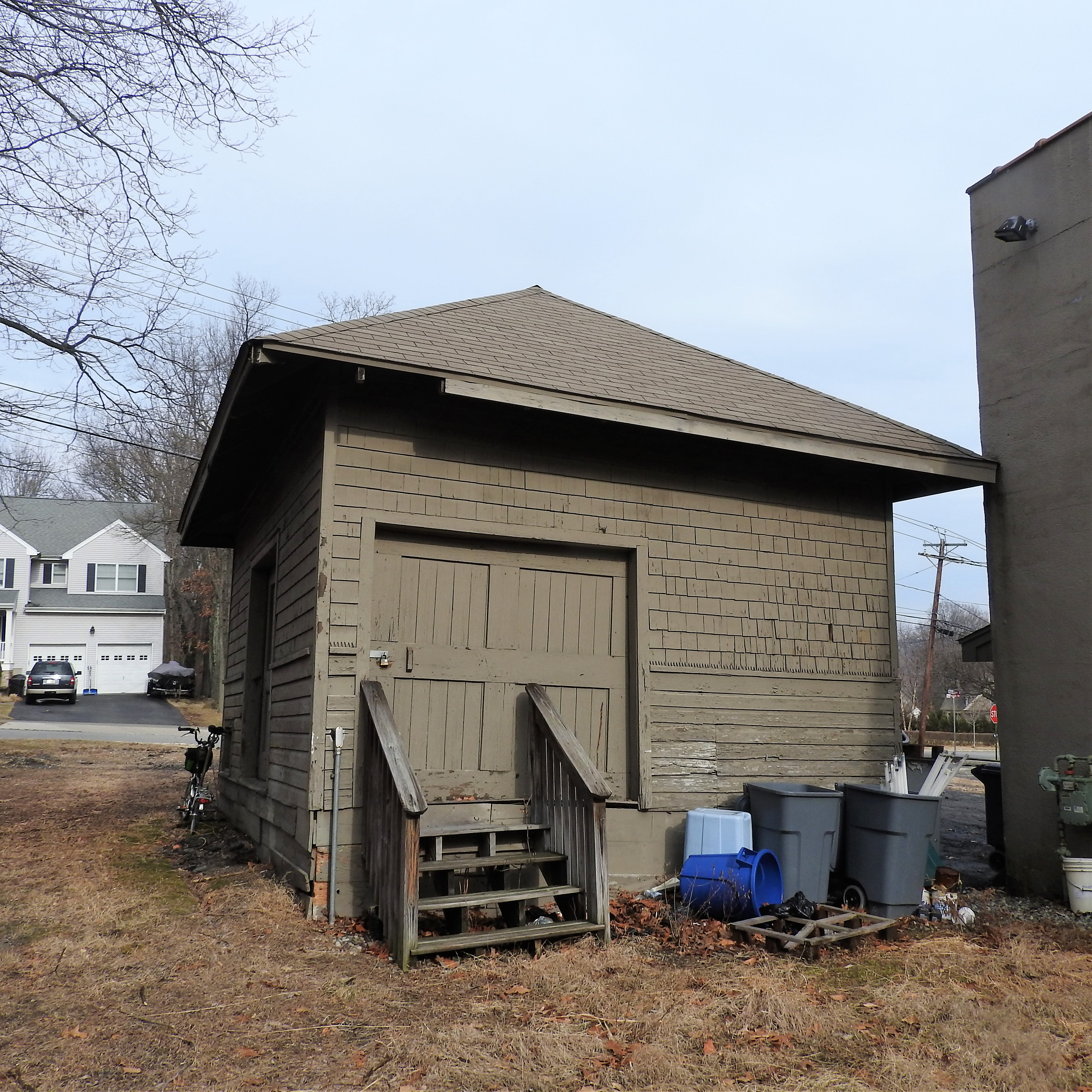
Verona freight station in February 2018

After several years of planning, negotiations began in June 1984 for a new trail. In September 1985, the Essex County Department of Parks, Recreation and Cultural Affairs acquired 2.84 miles (4.57 km) of the right-of-way in Verona and Cedar Grove from the Erie Lackawanna Railroad for $380,000. The agreement included that the trail would be reduced in length from 5.2 miles (8.4 km) and the rest of the right-of-way and some easements would be requested to build the full length in the future. The new West Essex Bikeway would be built by the Essex County Department of Parks, the Sierra Club and the New Jersey Conservation Foundation.

In 1991, Arthur Smith and the Verona Historical Society looked at preserving the standing freight shed, a 9-foot (2.7 m) tall structure. The structure, standing on two different properties, would be restored and moved from its location at Depot Street and Personette Avenue and converted into a museum. William Kiefer, who owned part of the land the structure stands on and 700 feet (210 m) of the right-of-way, offered to donate the structure to the municipality for public use. However, the Verona Historical Society was unable to find a new location for the proposed museum. With no money to paint the structure or move it, they asked the Verona Board of Education to use a site near the athletic fields. The Board of Education rejected their proposed site and because of the inability to find a new location, the Verona Historical Society rejected the building and left it at Depot Street and Personette Avenue.

On July 12, 2010, the Verona Township Council approved a recommendation from the Verona Landmarks Preservation Commission (VLPC) to have the former freight station become the first township historic landmark. Don Wilson and Charles Poekel Jr. both said using the former station as a one-room museum would be a good idea, saying it was currently being used for storage instead. With the land for sale in March 2013, the VLPC began efforts to get the Verona freight station on the National Register of Historic Places to ensure its preservation after an ownership change. The VLPC, the Verona Historical Society and the Verona Environment Commission looked at moving the station to a new spot to ensure its preservation. The triumvirate began looking at a spot on Fairview Avenue near Verona High School, but noted that the municipality would possibly not own the property they wanted. The corporation that owned a nearby housing complex also might have owned some land. A local donor agreed to move the shed when a location would be found and approved, but no date had been set.

== See also ==
- West Arlington station - A station closed on September 30, 1966, along with the Caldwell Branch.

== Bibliography ==
- Jaeger, Phillip Edward (2000). Images of America: Cedar Grove. Mount Pleasant, South Carolina: Arcadia Publishing. pp. 27–34. ISBN 978-0-7385-0452-0.
- Yanosey, Robert J. (2006). Erie Railroad Facilities (In Color). Vol. 1: New Jersey. Scotch Plains, New Jersey: Morning Sun Books Inc. ISBN 1-58248-183-0.
