= Essex Fells station =

Former Erie railroad station in New Jersey, US

Essex Fells
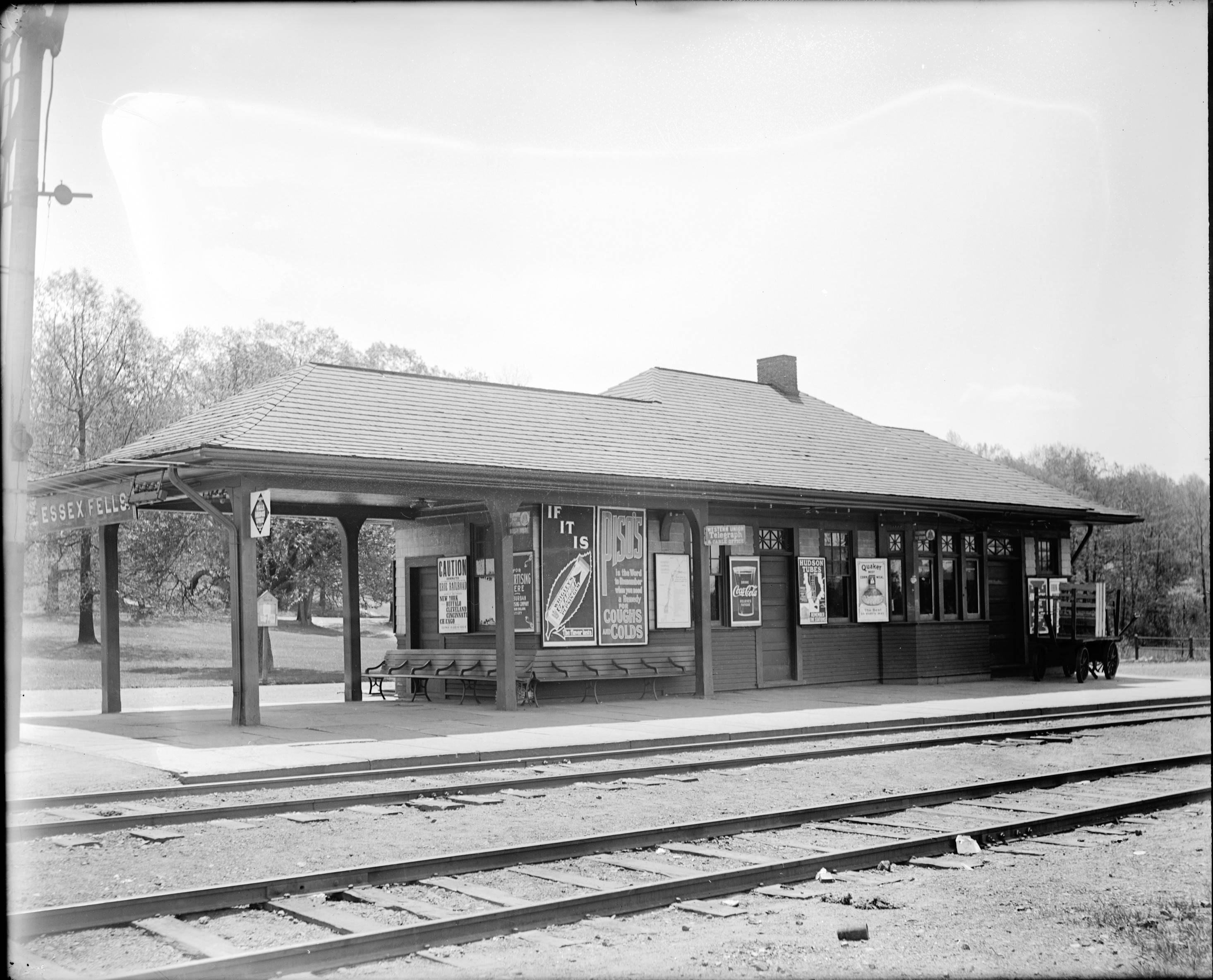
- Essex Fells station c. 1907–1912.

General information
- Location: Oak Lane at Chestnut Street, Essex Fells, New Jersey
- Owner: Roseland Railway (1892–1896); New York and Greenwood Lake Railroad (1896 – 1943); Erie Railroad (1896–1960); Erie-Lackawanna Railway (1960–1966); Morristown and Erie Railroad (1904–1928)
- Lines: Caldwell Branch; Morristown and Erie Railroad
- Platforms: 1 side platform
- Tracks: 2

Other information
- Station code: 1763

History
- Opened: 1892; 134 years ago (Erie Railroad passenger service); November 21, 1904; 121 years ago (Morristown and Erie passenger service)
- Closed: April 29, 1928; 98 years ago (Morristown and Erie passenger service); October 3, 1966; 59 years ago (Erie Railroad passenger service)

Key dates
- November 1966: 1903 station depot razed

Services
Preceding station	Erie Railroad	Following station
Terminus	Caldwell Branch	Caldwell toward Great Notch
Preceding station	Morristown and Erie Railroad	Following station
Roseland toward Morristown	Main Line	Terminus

Essex Fells was the terminus of the Erie Railroad's Caldwell Branch in the Essex County community of Essex Fells, New Jersey. Located at the junction of Oak Lane and Chestnut Lane in Essex Fells, the station was also a connection to the Morristown and Erie Railroad, which continued west through Roseland towards Morristown. The next station north from the Essex Fells station was Caldwell heading northward to Great Notch in Little Falls, where the line connected to the New York and Greenwood Lake Railroad.

Service through the Caldwells began on August 3, 1891 with the opening of the Caldwell Railway, a four-station service between Caldwell Junction (later Great Notch) and originally, Caldwell. The service was extended in 1892 to Essex Fells, when a station was constructed by famed architect Bradford Gilbert at the cost of $3,000 (1892 USD). The station depot without its awnings came to dimensions of 20 feet (6.1 m) by 52 feet (16 m) and made of stone with a porte-cochere on the right side. This station depot still stands on Oak Lane, a short distance east of the station site. The depot was replaced by another structure, constructed later. In 1903, the Morristown and Erie Railroad was approved to extend to Essex Fells and provide a direct connection to the Erie and New York City.

Service along the Caldwell Branch was rapidly downgraded starting in 1928. Passenger service on the Morristown and Erie was terminated on April 29, 1928, but still had freight connections. By 1962, the Caldwell Branch, and service to Essex Fells had been consolidated to two daytime trains heading to Hoboken Terminal and two back. With no weekend service, the last train arrived in Essex Fells on September 30, 1966, after the newly formed Erie Lackawanna Railroad got permission from the Interstate Commerce Commission to cut several branches, but the closure was not official until October 3, 1966. After service was terminated, the mayor of Essex Fells requested the Erie Lackawanna tear down the station depot on Oak Lane, and the job was completed just a month later in November 1966. However the 1892-built station remains intact as a house nearby the old station.

== Station design ==
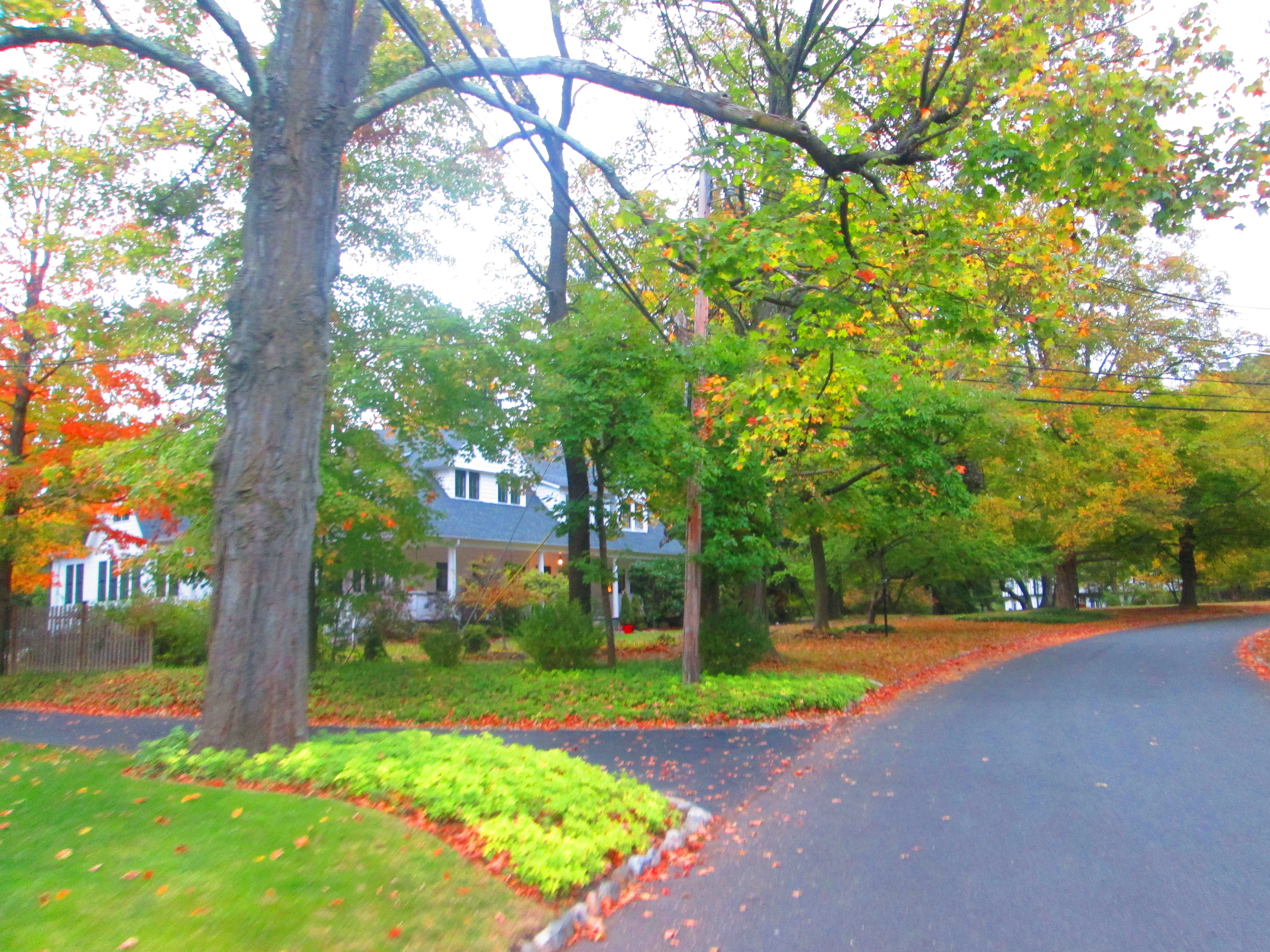
The original Bradford Gilbert built-depot, now serving as a house, in October 2013

The first station depot constructed at the Essex Fells station site was located on modern-day Oak Lane in Essex Fells, then a section of Caldwell. The depot was designed by Bradford Lee Gilbert, a noted architect, and completed in 1892 by the Roseland Railway, which also paid for the depot. The depot was a two-story structure constructed of wood and stone in the style of an English cottage with dimensions of 20 by 57 feet (6.1 by 17.4 m) (not including the awnings over the depot). The structure also retained rooms for the agent to reside and a porch at the end along with a porte-cochere. The entire structure was contracted at a cost of $3,000 (1892 USD).

The second depot, constructed in 1903 according to the Erie Railroad's report to the Interstate Commerce Commission, was constructed by the Erie Railroad as a type V one story structure out of timber.

The station complex consisted of several important features. First, a siding was provided that would also connect to the Roseland Railway (later the Morristown and Erie Railway). A turntable was also constructed in 1896 at the southern end of the station and at the northern end of the complex, a water tower for the purposes of serving steam engines, which were used to service the line.

=== Remnants ===
While the 1903-built station building was removed in 1966, the 1892-built one remains nearby the station, as a house on Oak Lane.

Concrete remnants of the 1896-built turntable still exist in the woods along the former railroad, along with some abandoned rails.

The right-of-way of the Morristown & Erie is intact west of the station as far as the Essex Freeway, where the active rails of the M&E begin. However, the Caldwell Branch right-of-way has been developed over from Essex Fells east to the start of the West Essex Trail in Verona, with the exception of the still-extant Verona station.

== History ==
=== Roseland Railway ===
Railroad service through Western Essex County came through the construction of the Caldwell Railway, a branch of the New York and Greenwood Lake Railroad, a line that runs from Jersey City to Sterling Forest, just over the New York state line in Orange County. The railroad went from Caldwell Junction, in the Great Notch section of Little Falls, New Jersey to the borough of Caldwell. Construction of the railroad occurred in 1891, with the railroad opening from Caldwell Junction to Great Notch formally on June 20 and regular passenger service beginning on July 4.

On October 30, 1891, the New Jersey State Legislature approved the incorporation of the Roseland Railway, a private-funded extension of the Caldwell Railway. This extension would involve going to a community established in 1889 named Essex Fells by Anthony Drexel of Philadelphia, Pennsylvania. A development officer for Drexel, Charles Levitt, visited the area near Caldwell and convinced Drexel to invest in 1,000 acres (400 ha), becoming the New York Suburban Land Company. Sensing that suburban commuters would benefit from a summer location for those who work in New York City and Newark. Construction of the first houses came in 1890 and 1891.

A group of private investors invested in the Roseland Railway, including Theodore Van Antuaf Trotter, a shareholder who donated personal land for the new station. Leavitt served as president of the railway and John P. Schofield served as secretary and treasurer. The 0.947 miles (1.524 km) railway would end 600 feet (180 m) west of Mill Road. Opened in 1892, the new station, designed by Bradford Lee Gilbert, was on the west side of the tracks. This station also doubled as the land office for the company developing Essex Fells.

=== Railroad's part in developing Essex Fells ===
The new railroad depot served as the centerpiece of Essex Fells. In 1893, Leavitt's wife, yearning for an Episcopal Church in the West Essex area instead of having to go to the one in Montclair, pressured for the creation of a parish in Essex Fells. The other benefit of the establishment of the parish was the new railroad, which they felt would bring new parishioners who would be interested in moving into Essex Fells. The first service for St. Peter's Episcopal Church came on June 25, 1893 by Dr. Burton Alexander Randall (1858–1932), a professor of otology at the University of Pennsylvania. The services in the railroad station caught the attention of Reverend Frederick Carter of Montclair's St. Luke's Episcopal, who supplied clergymen and readers for the church in the depot until 1896. In 1896, St. Peter's laid a cornerstone for the construction of a new church so they did not have to rely on the railroad station. The new church opened on Christmas Day that year.

On July 21, 1897, the Roseland Railway was sold to the New York and Greenwood Lake Railway, becoming a part of the Erie Railroad system itself. Essex Fells itself became its own municipality on March 31, 1902, splitting from Caldwell Township.

=== Railroad expansion in Essex Fells ===
The Whippany River Railroad, a railroad between Morristown and Whippany, received approval from the New Jersey State Legislature for the incorporation of the Whippany and Passaic River Railroad on October 6, 1902. This new railroad with $350,000 (1902 USD) was to build a new right-of-way for an extension of the railroad from Whippany to Essex Fells, a 7-mile (11 km) stretch. By late November, the railroad had already purchased nearly the entire amount of land it would need for the new railroad extension. The two railroads merged on August 28, 1903, becoming the Morristown and Erie Railroad.

In July 1903, the family of the former Erie Railroad president, Jay Gould, put consideration of reviving the original proposed alignment of the Caldwell Railroad into service. Constructed in 1872, the original plan was to tunnel through First Mountain in Montclair, running service through Verona, Caldwell and now Essex Fells. The Erie considered using the under construction extension to Essex Fells of the Morristown and Erie as part of a service extension to Morristown with possible extensions in the future to Whitehouse. There were also proposals for the Goulds to use the service via Oxford to work on a new line to Chicago, Illinois. However, Richard McEwan, the man in charge of the Morristown and Erie, denied that the Goulds or the Wabash Railroad were interested in their right-of-way.

By July 1903, the right-of-way for a 100-foot (30 m) wide, four-track railbed had already been secured. Grading was about halfway done at that point. By December, the grading was all done, along with the bridge construction. 80-pound (36,000 g) rails had been laid on 4 miles (6.4 km) of the railbed. The first test run of a train with Richard McEwan and his family came on May 3, 1904. At Essex Fells, both railroads worked on expanding facilities. Together they would build a brand new freight yard containing a 60-foot (18 m) diameter turntable, roundhouse and water tanks. (A similar yard was also built at Morristown). The Erie also built a new station in 1903 to replace the Bradford Lee Gilbert structure. The Morristown and Erie also made an agreement with Western Union to equip all the stations with telegraph as well as telephone service.

The Morristown and Erie Railroad opened the railroad from Whippany to Essex Fells on November 21, 1904. Working in conjunction with the Erie, two trains would operate between Morristown and Essex Fells in each direction. Fares would be 30¢ (1904 USD). New stations also opened at nearby Beaufort, Roseland and Hanover. The Erie also established ticket sales for the Morristown and Erie Railroad, including at Essex Fells.

=== Stagnant service and decline ===
In 1909, the Erie Railroad established an express train along the Caldwell Branch that would only stop at the Montclair–Erie Plaza station before heading to Pavonia Terminal. Service through Essex Fells had been primarily used by those who were commuting to summer homes in Essex Fells, along with nearby Caldwell and Verona. By October 1923, it was clear that the Caldwell Branch was of limited success to the Erie Railroad. Other than the single express train, the Erie Railroad had not changed the schedule for the entire branch save for a period during World War I when they eliminated the express. The train was later re-instated. Residents of Caldwell wanted more trains for commuters to use on the branch and for women to go shopping in March 1925.

However, by 1928, railroad cuts in Essex Fells began. The Morristown and Erie Railroad suspended passenger service between Morristown and Essex Fells on April 28.

In the early 1930s, Essex Fells station was victim to two different attempted robberies. The first one was in August 1931. Warren Conklin and Nathan Rosenberg both attempted to rob Essex Fells station of New York City. In their second attempt of the day, Conklin and Rosenberg attempted to rob a pharmacy in Cedar Grove. They thought there would be money at Essex Fells for them, though both denied they were robbing the post office. On October 17, 1933, Victor Celestey of Newton, Massachusetts robbed the Essex Fells station. Police spotted him going for the station coin box. Celestey, a man with a lengthy criminal history, ran 2 miles (3.2 km) into Roseland, where he was brought to the hospital with gunshot wounds.

Proposals to drop service at Essex Fells started in 1941. On March 31, 1941, the Erie announced they asked the Public Utilities Commission asked to eliminate 32 trains from the schedule. Seven of them were on the Caldwell Branch. Four of the trains were direct trains from Essex Fells to Jersey City and vice versa. The other three were trains between Great Notch and Essex Fells. In June, the Erie Railroad withdrew the petition to drop the trains after local complaints and complaints from the labor unions.

In July 1950, the Erie tried again on eliminating passenger service on the Caldwell Branch (along with the New York and Greenwood Lake main line). This time, Sunday service would be eliminated and eight trains on the branch would end. Opposition was swift and powerful for communities from Caldwell to Wanaque. These cuts went into effect in November 1950. The Erie Railroad proposed more cuts in November 1952. These changes came on April 26, 1953.

=== Closure ===
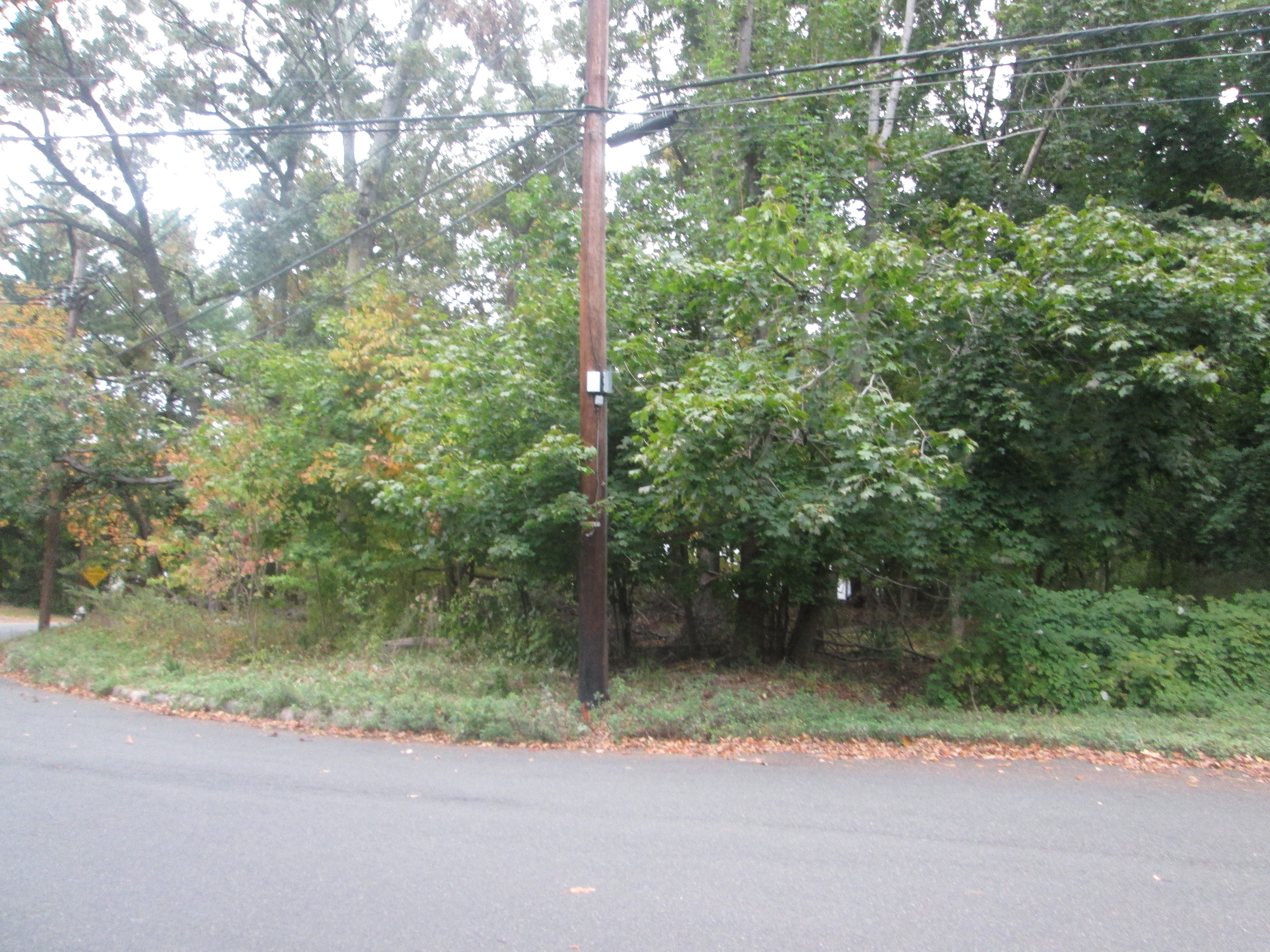
The former site of the Essex Fells station in October 2013

By April 1962, service on the Caldwell Branch was down to 2 trains in each direction a day. This service was only run from Monday–Friday, with no weekend or holiday service. In May 1966, service provided about 659 passengers going eastbound and 193 westbound. The Public Utilities Commissioners approved for the replacement of train service on the Caldwell Branch to bus service starting June 1. However, the Commissioners overturned the decision pending action by the New Jersey State Legislature, extending passenger service on the line for two more months. However, in early September 1966, the Commissioners overturned the decision, noting the financial struggle of the Erie Lackawanna Railway, who was operating the branch line. The cut of passenger service on the Caldwell Branch would commence in early October under the order. The final passenger train arrived at Essex Fells station on September 30, 1966. All service changes based on the September 1966 went into effect on October 3, the following Monday.

With the end of passenger service, Mayor Graeme Reid of Essex Fells, who had represented the municipality in preventing the discontinuation of passenger service, requested that the Erie Lackawanna demolish the 1903 station depot. The railroad obliged in November 1966. Freight service continued until a serious washout in 1975 ruined a long stretch of the line. With the tracks in deteriorating condition, the federal government did not take over the tracks for use by Conrail and were torn out in 1979.

== Bibliography ==
- Gilbert, Bradford L. (1895). Sketch Portfolio of Railroad Stations: From Original Designs. The Railroad Gazette.
- Hepler, Steven P. (1999). The American Century Series: Rails Through the Hanover Hills: The Morristown & Erie Railroad. Mount Pleasant, South Carolina: Arcadia Publishing. ISBN 9780738597027.
- Interstate Commerce Commission (1931). Decisions of the Interstate Commerce Commission of the United States (Volume 33 ed.). Washington D.C.: U.S. Government Printing Office.
- Jaeger, Phillip Edward (2000). Images of America: Cedar Grove. Mount Pleasant, South Carolina: Arcadia Publishing. ISBN 0738504521.
- New Jersey Department of State (1914). List of Certificates To December 31, 1911. Trenton, New Jersey: MacCrellish and Quigley.
- New Jersey State Board of Assessors (1893). Annual Report of the State Board of Assessors of the State of New Jersey for the Year 1892. Trenton, New Jersey: The John L. Murphy Publishing Company.
- New Jersey State Board of Taxes and Assessment (1922). Seventh Annual Report of the State Board of Taxes and Assessment. Trenton, New Jersey: State of New Jersey.
- New York Board of Railroad Commissioners (1903). General Railroad Laws of the State of New York With Amendments to and Including the Session of the Legislature of 1906. Albany, New York: The Argus Company.
- Poekel, Charles A. Jr. (1999). Images of America: West Essex: Essex Fells, Fairfield, North Caldwell and Roseland. Mount Pleasant, South Carolina: Arcadia Publishing. ISBN 9780738501413.
- Schwieterman, Joseph P. (2001). When the Railroad Leaves Town: American Communities in the Age of Rail Line Abandonment, Eastern United States. Kirksville, Missouri: Truman State University Press. ISBN 978-0-943549-97-2.
- Yanosey, Robert (2006). Erie Railroad Facilities in Color: Volume 1: New Jersey. Scotch Plains, New Jersey: Morning Sun Books. ISBN 1582481830.
