= Prospect Street station (Passaic, New Jersey) =

Prospect Street
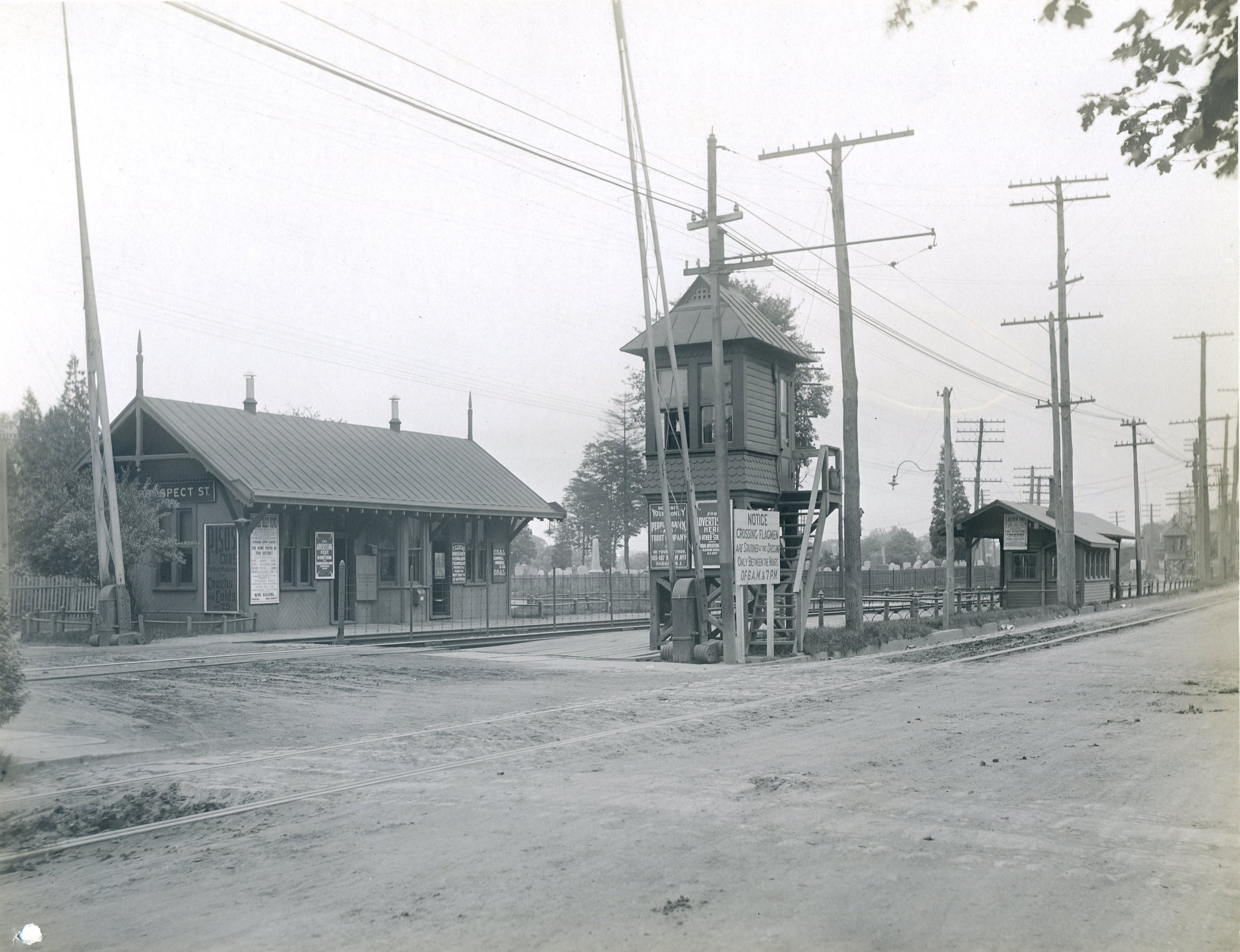
- Prospect Street station in December 1909.

General information
- Location: Main Avenue at Prospect Street, Passaic, Passaic County, New Jersey
- Coordinates: 40.8627°N 74.1277°W
- Line: Erie Railroad Main Line
- Platforms: 2 side platforms
- Tracks: 2 main line

Construction
- Platform levels: 1

Other information
- Station code: 2129

History
- Opened: June 21, 1880
- Closed: 1953
- Rebuilt: 1913
- Former names: Passaic Centre (June 21, 1880–c. 1882)

Services
Preceding station	Erie Railroad	Following station
Passaic toward Ridgewood	Main Line local stops	Passaic Park toward Jersey City
Location

Prospect Street was a former commuter railroad station in the city of Passaic, Passaic County, New Jersey. One of four stations for the Erie Railroad in Passaic, Prospect Street had a single station depot with two platforms. The next station going north towards Dearborn Station in Chicago, Illinois was the downtown Passaic station while the next station south toward Pavonia Terminal in Jersey City was Passaic Park. The station opened on June 21, 1880 as Passaic Centre station, located at a former site of the downtown Passaic station, back when the latter was known as Huyler's. The name was changed to Prospect Street around 1882. After multiple attempts to eliminate the station along with another at Harrison Street, the railroad succeeded in 1953.

== Station layout ==
Street level	Station building
Ground/ Platform level	Side platform
Ground/ Platform level	Track	← Main Line limited service toward Dearborn Station (Passaic)
Ground/ Platform level	Track	Main Line limited service toward Pavonia Terminal (Passaic Park) →
Ground/ Platform level	Side platform
Ground/ Platform level	Street level	Station building

== History ==
Railroad service through the city of Passaic began on May 28, 1832 with the opening of the Paterson and Hudson River Railroad through Acquackanonk to Paterson. The first station, later to be known as Huyler's station, one of the early locations of the downtown Passaic station from 1832–1848, when it was moved to modern-day Park Place. A new station opened on June 21, 1880, when the Erie Railroad opened Passaic Centre station with two trains and early ridership success. The station received its first agent for sale of tickets on November 15, 1880. By May 1881, this had expanded to seven trains daily. It was c. 1882 that the station name was changed from Passaic Centre to Prospect Street.

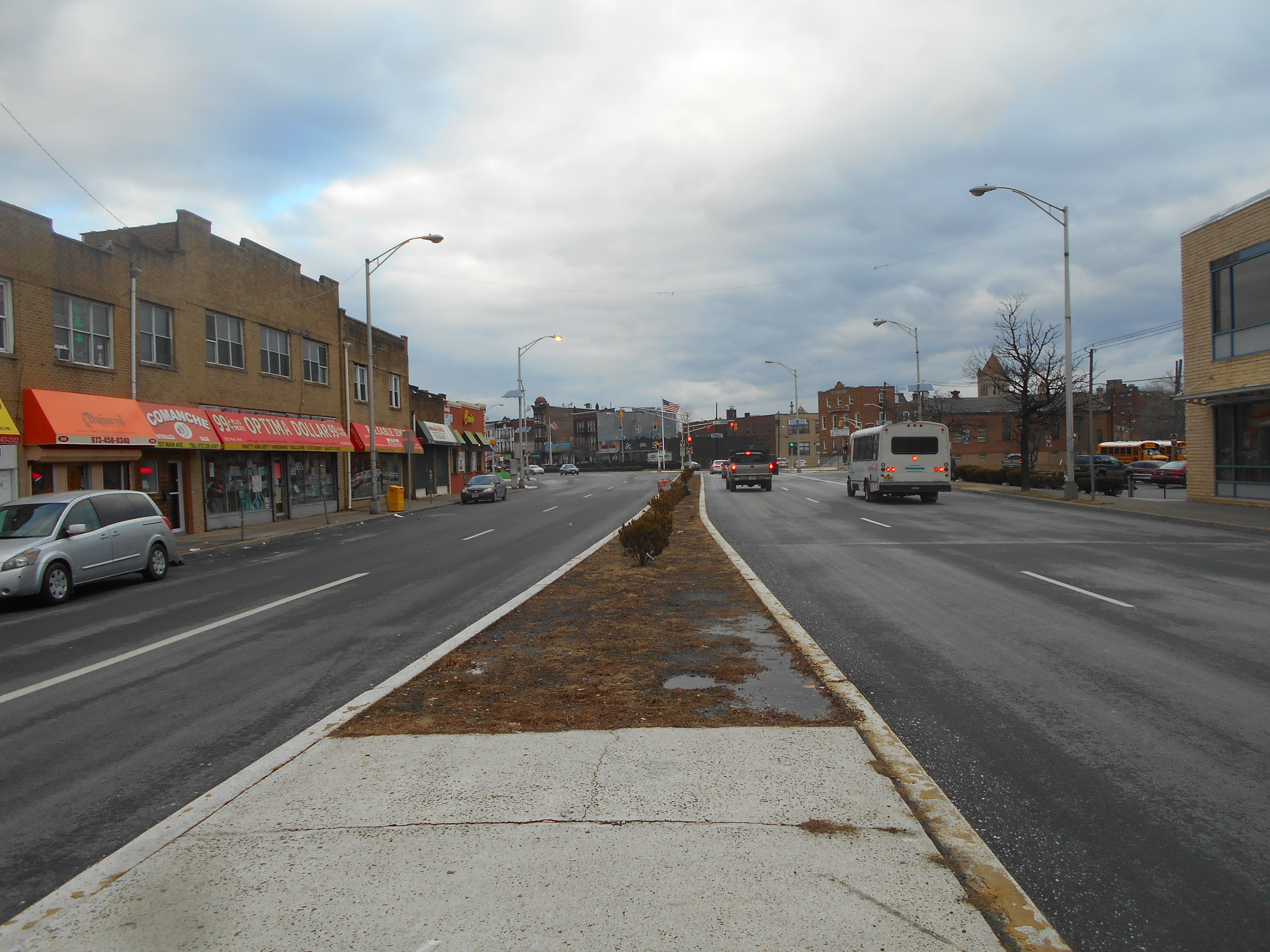
The site of the Prospect Street station in January 2015

In June 1887, a flagman's stand was added to the Prospect Street stop to mix in with the local design. That September, rumors arose of the railroad moving the station to a new one to be built at Academy Street, consolidating with the main downtown station, which was met with immediate opposition.

The station depot on the northbound side of the tracks, rebuilt in 1913, was 40 by 14 feet (12.2 m × 4.3 m) while the southbound side had one of 10 by 8 feet (3.0 m × 2.4 m).

In October 1921, the Erie Railroad requested to the Board of Public Utility Commissioners about eliminating the agent at Prospect Street station. Albert O. Miller, Jr., Passaic's legal counsel, defended for the city. The Erie Railroad, represented by Grover James, a resident of Passaic, stated that the Prospect Street station was not making enough money to justify keeping an gent. Frank Waldron, the agent representative at the meeting, noted the railroad made $8,428.43 in 1919 and $7,444.93 in 1920. The railroad also stated that about 50 percent of the revenue at Prospect Street was in commuters. In return, the railroad would pay its agent $1,297.44 (about 17.6 percent of the revenue for 1920–1921). The plan was to replace the station agent with a caretaker who would be paid $360 a year to open the station depot and keep it clean.

Miller and James participated in some verbal dueling, asking if the decision to eliminate the agent was because the revenue is poor due to poor service. Herbert Parker, a witness for the city, defended the station noting that the new YMCA was being built nearby. Park also added that locals felt the conditions at the downtown Passaic and Passaic Park stations were "rotten", which James objected to. Statistics were provided that 592 people boarded at Prospect Street on October 17. The Commissioners noted that the station's high commuter base would be a good reason to maintain a station agent. While they understood the railroad's interest in cutting expensives wherever possible, the fact that Prospect Street was in a business section of the city and had high ridership was the reason to deny the switch to a caretaker. On December 6, 1921, the Commissioners denied the railroad's petition.

The station on the southbound side was demolished in December 1923.

In June 1952, it was announced that the Erie Railroad would get a $300,000 improvement project through the city. This would include the installation of automatic gates at several crossings on Main Avenue and the widening of East Main Avenue. The downtown Passaic and Passaic Park stations would be renovated and the stops at Prospect Street and Harrison Street would be eliminated. This project would require the support of the Board of Public Utilities Commissioners. The Erie signed off on it, noting the city would have to pay little or nothing for the improvements. By this time, Harrison and Prospect Street stations combined for only 22 riders on average daily. Noting both stations were in disrepair and the limited funds should be used on the other two stations, the city of Passaic showed it support to eliminating the two stops. The stations at Prospect Street and Harrison Street were boarded up by November.

The Public Utilities Commissioners noted in March 1953 that a decision would be made soon and that there were no agents at either stop, which had been reduced to shelter sheds by that point in time.

== See also ==
- Passaic Plan

== Bibliography ==
- Board of Public Utility Commissioners of the State of New Jersey (1922). Reports of the Board of Public Utility Commissioners of the State of New Jersey Volume 9. Trenton, New Jersey: State Gazette Publishing Company.
- Erie Railroad (1913). Eighteenth Annual Report of the Board of Directors of the Erie Railroad Company to the Bond and Share Holders Fiscal Year Ending June 30, 1913. New York, New York: Erie Railroad.
- Lucas, Walter Arndt (1944). From the Hills to the Hudson: A History of the Paterson and Hudson River Rail Road and its Associates, the Paterson and Ramapo, and the Union Railroads. New York, New York: The Cornwall Press. hdl:2027/uc1.b4536228.
- State Board of Assessors (1913). Twenty-Ninth Annual Report of the State Board of Assessors of the State of New Jersey For the Year 1912. Somerville, New Jersey: The Unionist-Gazette Association, State Printers.
