= Caldwell station =

Rail station in Caldwell, New Jersey, U.S.

Caldwell
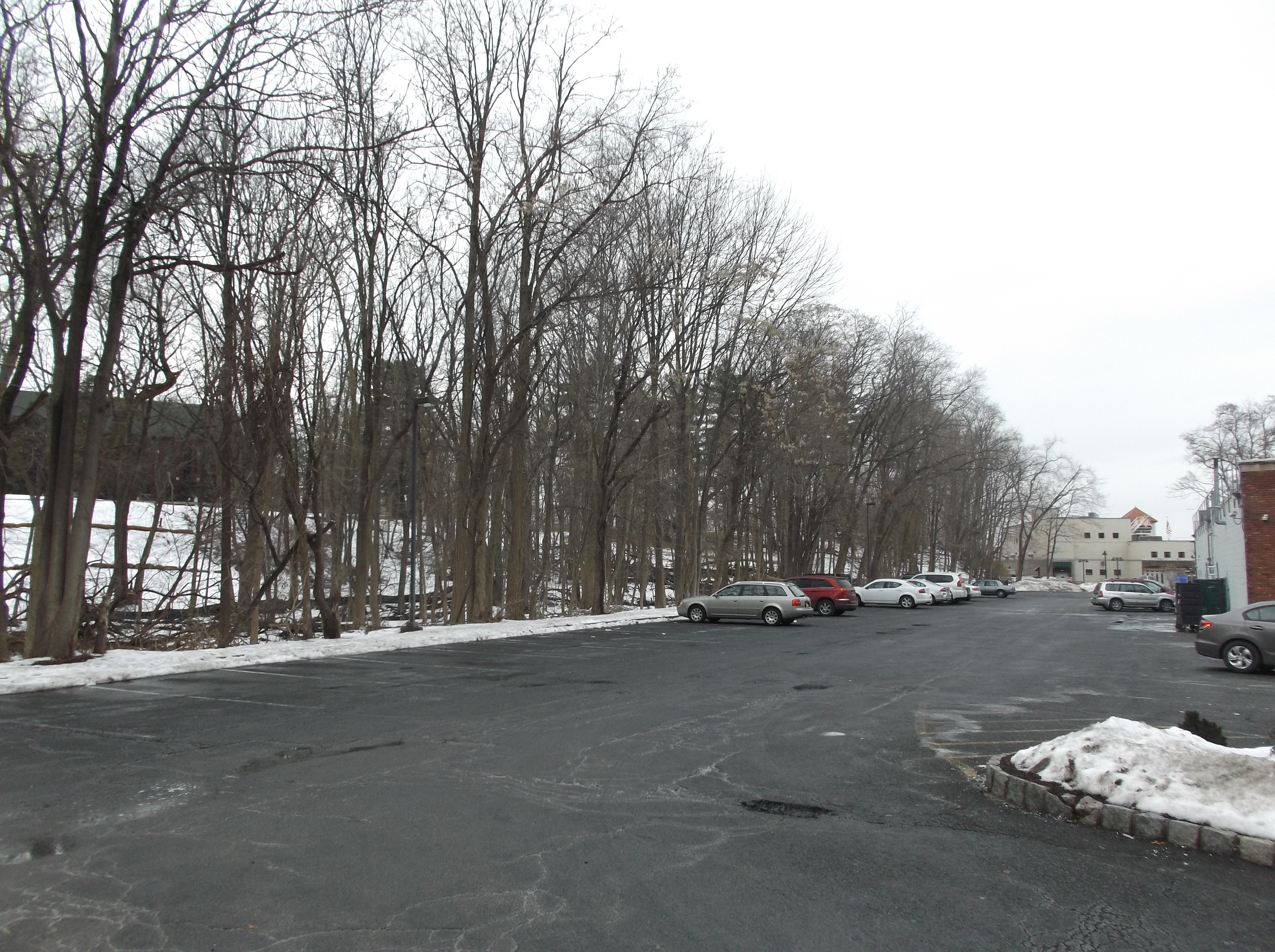
- The Caldwell station site in February 2014. The right-of-way ran through the line of trees at the end of the parking lot.

General information
- Location: Bloomfield Avenue (CR 506), Caldwell, New Jersey 07006
- Coordinates: 40.8359°N 74.2714°W
- Line: Caldwell Branch
- Platforms: 1 side platform
- Tracks: 2

Other information
- Station code: 1757

History
- Opened: June 20, 1891 (formal opening); July 4, 1891 (passenger opening)
- Closed: September 30, 1966
- Rebuilt: 1904

Key dates
- August 6, 1965: Station depot razed

Former services
Preceding station	Erie Railroad	Following station
Essex Fells Terminus	Caldwell Branch	Verona toward Great Notch
Location

Caldwell station is a defunct commuter railroad station in the eponymous borough of Caldwell, Essex County, New Jersey. Located on Bloomfield Avenue (County Route 506) to the northeast of Caldwell College (modern-day Caldwell University), the station serviced trains of the Erie Railroad and Erie Lackawanna Railroad's Caldwell Branch between Essex Fells station and Great Notch station in Little Falls. Caldwell station was one of two stations in the borough, the second being the stop at the Monomonock Inn, a local hotel that was open until 1940. The station consisted of two tracks and a single side platform next to the Erie's station depot.

Railroad service in Caldwell began with the construction of the Caldwell Railroad, a branch of the New York and Greenwood Lake Railroad from Great Notch to Caldwell. The railroad opened on an unofficial basis on June 20, 1891, opening to the public on July 4. A 16.5-by-20.5-by-14-foot (5.0 m × 6.2 m × 4.3 m) station depot stood at Caldwell, which marked as the end of the 4.7-mile (7.6 km) branch until 1892, when the line was extended to nearby Essex Fells. With the opening of the Morristown and Erie Railroad in 1904, a new station depot was built at Caldwell due to expectations of higher traffic volume. The nearby station in Verona burned to the ground in an arson on January 7, 1905 and with the old station depot at Caldwell expendable, a team of railroad workers on horseback moved the original depot to Verona to serve as the new depot.

With declining ridership and service, the borough demolished the 1904-built station depot for new business development in August 1965. Service on the Caldwell Branch continued until September 30, 1966, when several lines operated by the Erie Lackawanna Railroad were simultaneously cut.

== History ==
Caldwell station opened with the construction of the Caldwell Branch of the New York and Greenwood Lake Railroad (a subsidiary of the Erie Railroad system). The original proposed service through Caldwell was the Caldwell Railroad, a company founded in March 1869 for the construction of a railroad between Montclair and Caldwell. Construction began in 1872 of the railroad. However, work on this route was suspended in 1872 due to the inability to complete a tunnel through Montclair and nearby Verona. About 2,000 feet (610 m) of the tunnel was left uncompleted.

The railroad was built in 1891, with the route via Great Notch station in Little Falls. As part of the construction, a depot, measured at 26 by 14 feet (7.9 m × 4.3 m), was built for the terminal of the new railroad. Service on the railroad began on July 4, 1891. Service, one year later, was extended to nearby Essex Fells.

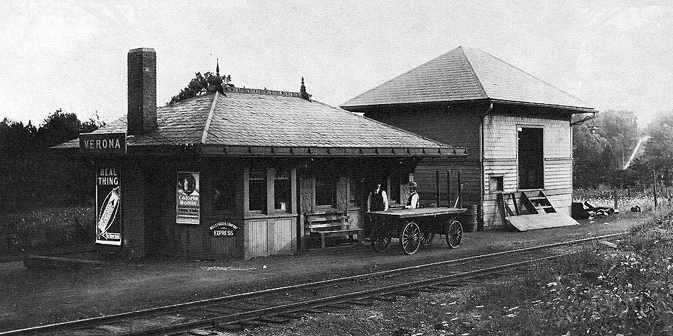
The former Caldwell station, built in 1891, serving as a depot for Verona in 1909

The station was replaced in 1904 as part of the construction of the Morristown and Caldwell Railroad. Construction of this new station cost the Erie Railroad $20,000 (1904 USD). The new station would do the work of the Erie Railroad and the Morristown and Caldwell Railroad. This new depot was measured at 53 by 23 feet (16.2 m × 7.0 m). On July 4, 1904, thirteen years after the commencement of service through Caldwell, the first train of the Morristown and Caldwell crossed through the borough. The old station, built in 1891, was moved across the tracks, serving as a freight house.

On January 9, 1905, the passenger station built at the nearby Verona station caught fire. The depot, along with its contents, were burned and lost. The Erie Railroad decided to take the old station at Caldwell, serving as a freight depot, to become the new passenger depot at Verona. In February 1905, the snow-covered ground served as an opportunity to move the depot. With 12 horses, the old freight depot was moved up Bloomfield Avenue on rafters to Depot Street and Personette Street. This depot burned down in the winter of 1962.

In July 1907, commuters were confused when they came to Caldwell station and found the doors locked. Henry Banta, the newly-appointed station agent, had left town and locked the station without telling anyone. When an employee from Pavonia Terminal came to Caldwell to open the station, they found everything in good condition with all books and details in place. Banta, like his predecessor, John I. Jacobus, is believed to have left due to the incredible amount of work it was taking with no assistant.

In 1902, the Monomonock Inn, a local hotel and resort, opened on the east side of Prospect Street, between Bloomfield Avenue and Academy Road. This helped influence the growth of Caldwell, to the extent that by 1916, the inn itself had its own station on the Caldwell Branch. The Inn was closed and razed in 1940, to be replaced by local housing and an A&P grocery store. Local streetcar service, which ran next to the Caldwell station on Bloomfield Avenue ended in 1952.

The borough of Caldwell purchased the depot in 1965 from the cash-strapped Erie Lackawanna Railroad. (The Erie Railroad and the Delaware, Lackawanna and Western Railroad had merged on October 17, 1960, as they were both struggling financially.) The borough razed the depot on August 6, 1965. Service at Caldwell station ended on September 30, 1966, when multiple branch lines of the Erie Lackawanna were discontinued.
