= Passaic Park station =

Former railway station in New Jersey, US

Passaic Park
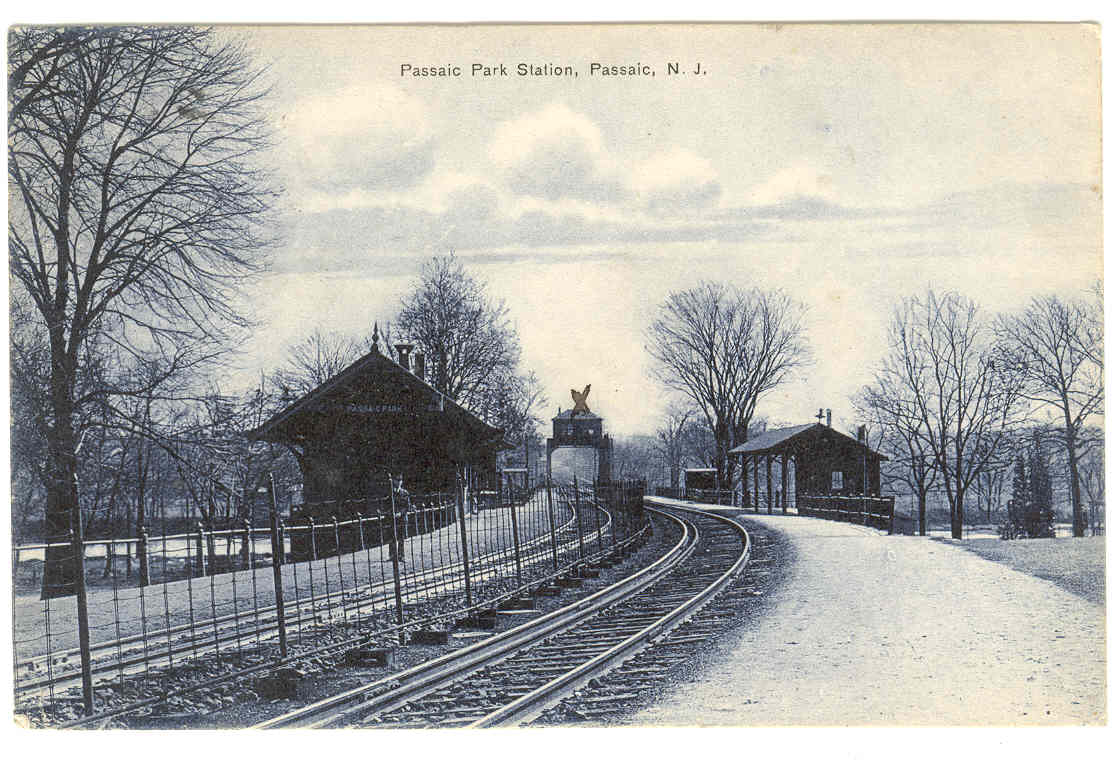
- Passaic Park station in 1914, eight years prior to the Type IV building's demolition in 1922 on a postcard. BE Drawbridge over the Passaic River is visible in the distance.

General information
- Location: Aycrigg Avenue, Passaic, New Jersey
- Coordinates: 40.847719°N 74.12245°W
- Owner: Erie Railroad (1883–1960); Erie Lackawanna Railway (1960–1963)
- Line: Erie Railroad Main Line
- Platforms: 2 side platforms
- Tracks: 2 main line

Construction
- Platform levels: 1

Other information
- Station code: 2127

History
- Opened: c. 1851
- Closed: April 2, 1963
- Rebuilt: 1870; 1923
- Former names: Passaic Bridge (c. 1851–1904)

Key dates
- December 6, 1923: 1870 station razed
- 1964: 1922 station razed

Former services
Preceding station	Erie Railroad	Following station
Prospect Street toward Ridgewood	Main Line local stops	Carlton Hill toward Jersey City
Location

Passaic Park station (formerly known as Passaic Bridge) was a former railroad station for the Erie Railroad's main line in Passaic, New Jersey in the epomonyous section of the city. The station was located between the Carlton Hill station and the Prospect Street station. The station was the easternmost of four Erie stations that served the city of Passaic, being demolished in 1963 as part of the abandonment of the railroad line through Passaic and Clifton. Passaic Park station, originally opened as part of the Paterson and Ramapo Railroad, was reconstructed in 1888 as a 57-by-16-foot (17.4 m × 4.9 m) wooden structure. The wooden station was the common design for station depots used by the Erie Railroad, designated Type IV. The station was replaced in 1923 with a Spanish tile roof station made of concrete and stone, after six years of litigation between the railroad and the city of Passaic.

== History ==
The station at Passaic Park was first called Passaic Bridge, as the station was located immediately westward of the line's exit from the BE Drawbridge over the Passaic River. The original station structure was built in 1888 near the grade crossing of Aycrigg Avenue and Main Ave in Passaic. The 1888 construction included two wooden structures. One the westbound side 57-by-16-foot (17.4 m × 4.9 m) was a shelter with a baggage office, ticket agent and restrooms. The second building, on the eastbound side, was a shelter with no facilities. By August 1911, the station was renamed to Passaic Park.

The site traversed what is today the southeast edge of Schevchenko Park and several homes constructed next to the park after the railroad abandoned the right of way.

=== Passaic demands a new station (1916–1922) ===
On November 2, 1916, the city of Passaic filed a petition with the Board of Public Utility Commissioners to demand that the Erie replace the 28-year-old wooden station at Passaic Park. The city felt that in particular, the eastbound platform at Passaic Park was a "menace" to health of their residents, facilities for drivers at the station were inadequate, and protection from the elements were not sufficient. The petition filed said the Erie had agreed that a new station at Passaic Park was necessary, and the city had appropriated land for a new facility. The Erie responded on May 1, 1917, to the petition, citing that a new station was in negotiations with the city, in which an agreement had been made to a new design based on the character of the area. However, there were problems in the design of the roof and due to the position of the railroad, a larger than affordable station was probably necessary. The railroad also said that the city's need for basic facilities is not needed, especially during the summer months and they felt this could wait until after World War I as supplies were needed for the war effort.

Hearings were held in Newark on May 2 and May 9, 1917, between the city and the railroad. Testimony was given by both sides in determining the need for a station, the present situation and whether the "wait until after the war" argument, which Passaic called an excuse, was viable. The board felt the city had made a fair case to new facilities, citing that the 1888 depot, present on the westbound side of the station had a ticket office, restrooms, and a baggage office. However, ridership was more present on the eastbound side, where only stood a shelter with no ticket offices, no places for the riders to use the restroom nor a baggage office. People who wanted to use those facilities needed to walk a considerable distance, including walking down to River Road and under the railroad bridge over to the station depot at Aycrigg Avenue. The city and the railroad both agreed, that due to the 400–500 passengers that averaged at the station daily, that the new station would be built on the eastbound side rather than the westbound. The current eastbound shelter also had problems in term of size, as it was hard to fit everybody into it in inclement weather. The board also determined the shelter was unkempt and poorly ventilated for impossible usage.

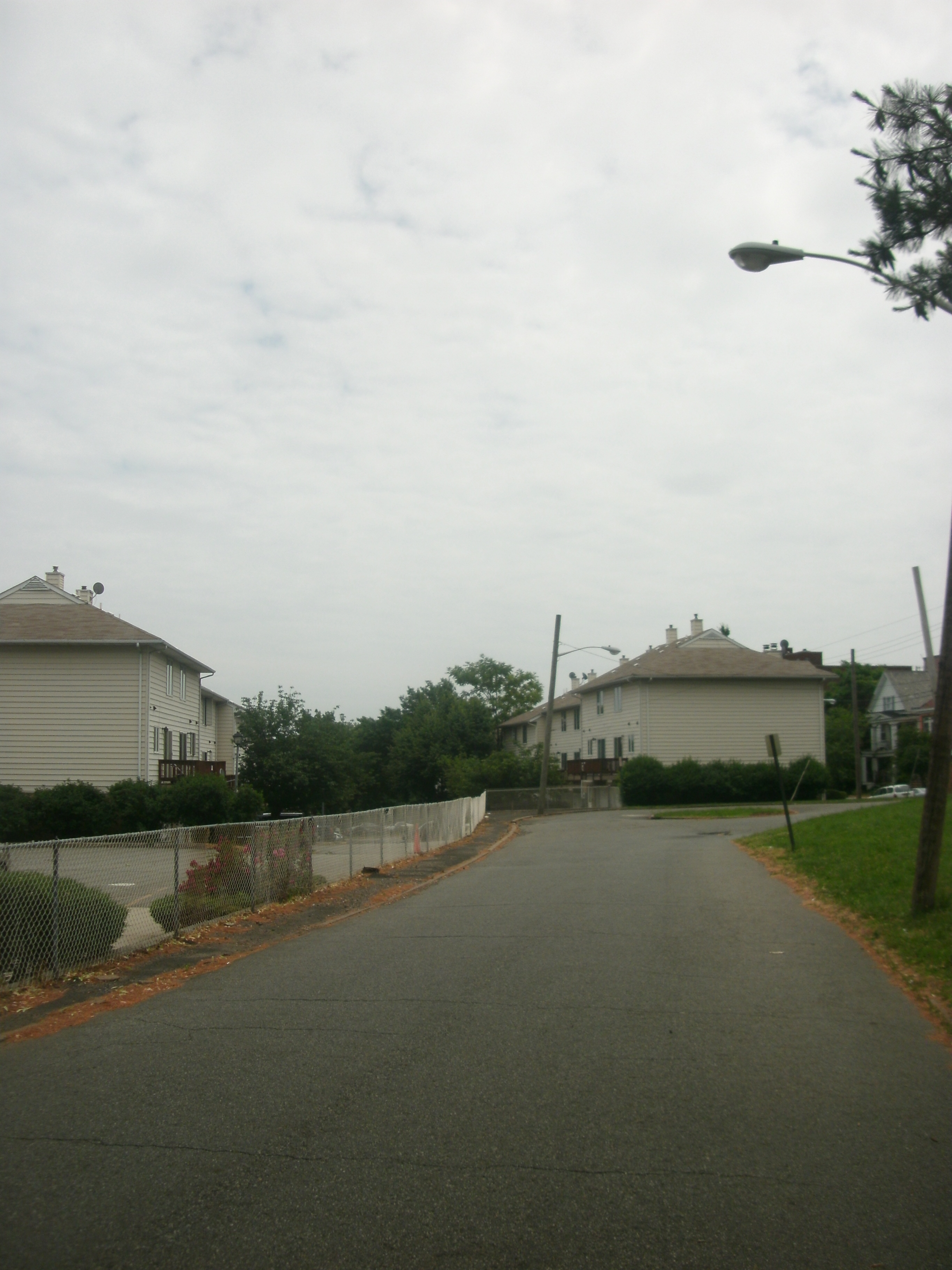
The site of the former Passaic Park station as viewed in June 2011 from the former right-of-way in Taras Shevchenko Park

The board also looked into the war "excuse" for reasons for delay, that the railroad had to deal with the federal government in times of war, however, the railroad was not just because of that able to ignore the needs of localities. $6,000 (1917 USD) was done for station improvements by the Erie already, and the board ruled that the existing facilities at Passaic Park were the fault of the railroad, and that the railroad must approve a new station and maintain the new station. On July 18, 1917, the board declared a rehearing based on the old petition and the delay of construction due to the war. It was determined that the Erie will still have to work with the federal government in moving troops around for the war process, and that the Erie was unnecessarily delaying the improvements. The improvements were then decided to be removed from the Erie's responsibility until conditions warrant. On August 24, 1922, the board demanded that the Erie, now after the war effort, file plans on February 1, and begin improving the Passaic Park station by March 10 of the next year. The station at Passaic Park was finished in 1923, as a new Spanish-revival station with a slate roof, similar in fashion to stations at Mahwah, New Jersey and Painted Post, New York.

=== The Passaic Plan (1949–1963) ===
During the 1950s and 1960s, several different entities (with interests in the cities of Paterson and Passaic) had desires/needs that interacted in a way that would change the future of railroads in the area. The Delaware, Lackawanna and Western railroad, which had long competed with the Erie both in northern New Jersey and extending westward, was having financial troubles and wanted to reduce passenger service, sharing trackage and the obligation to transport passengers with the Erie. Secondly, the city officials in Passaic brought a proposal to the Erie to examine the feasibility of removing the main line through the city's downtown area, which was causing traffic jams during station stops. This, however, was not implemented during the 1950s, as proposed. Instead, the Erie reconstructed the stations at Passaic and Clifton. Third, the New Jersey State Highway Department needed rights-of-way for Interstate 80 through Paterson and State Route 21 through Passaic. The Passaic Park station and BE Drawbridge, which spanned the nearby Passaic River, would need to be demolished to build State Route 21.

After the October 17, 1960 merger between the Delaware, Lackawanna and Western and the Erie, city officials in Passaic reiterated the possibility of removing the tracks through Main Street, Passaic. This time, the newly formed Erie Lackawanna Railway went forward with it, beginning the process to move its main line onto the former Boonton Branch through Lyndhurst, Passaic and Clifton. On April 2, 1963, the last train passed through the station and the former Erie main from BE Draw to Paterson. The main line was abandoned past Carlton Hill, and BE Drawbridge was swung in the open position, and soon put up for sale price of $0.00 in 1964 by the mayor of Passaic.

On January 21, 1964, the city of Passaic awarded a $1,920 (1964 USD) contract to raze the Passaic Park station to Naples Excavating Company, a local contractor.

== See also ==
- Mahwah station - station with similar designs to the 1922 Passaic Park station.
