= Carlton Hill station =

Railroad station for the Erie Railroad in East Rutherford

Carlton Hill
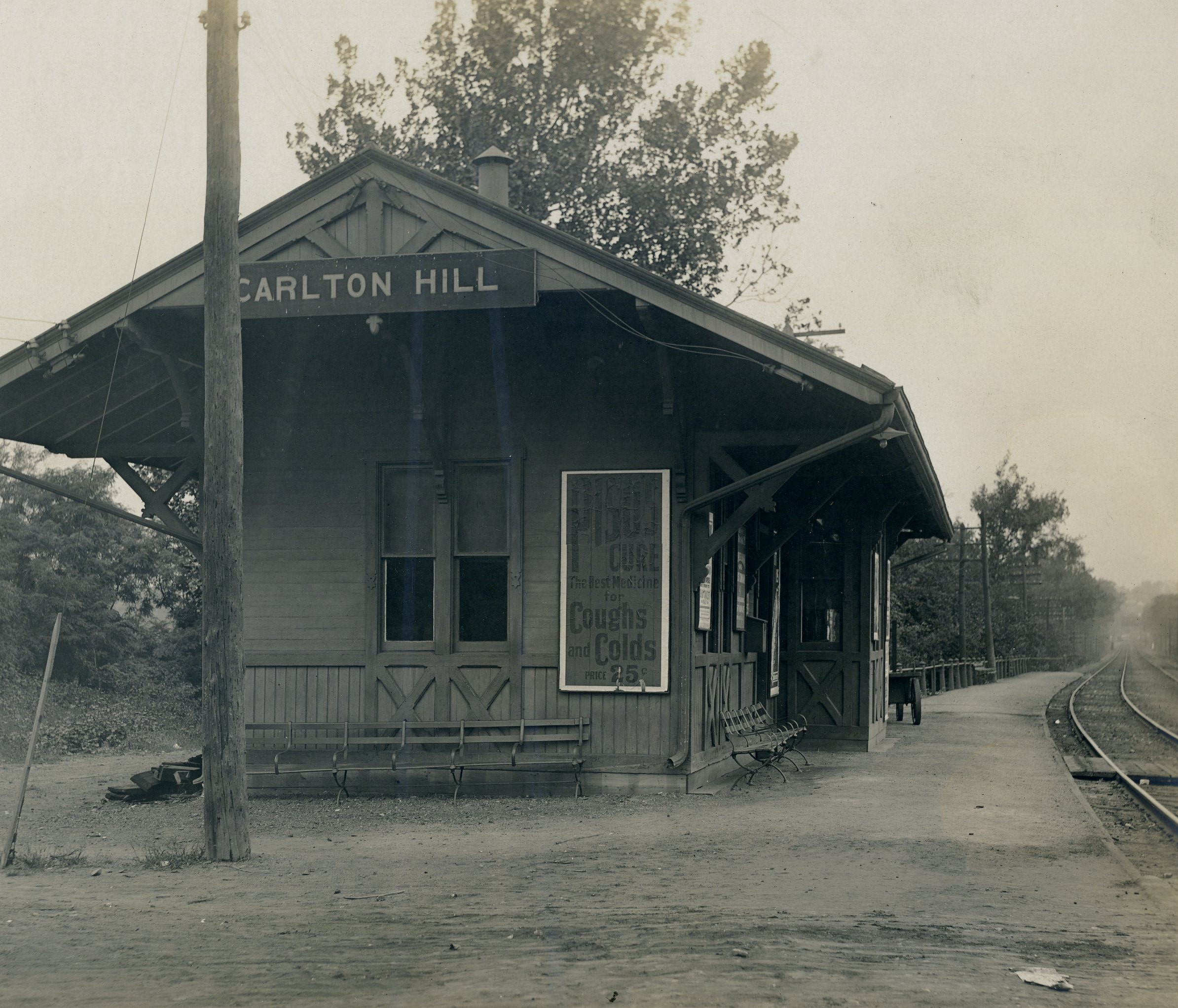
- Carlton Hill station in December 1909, facing towards BE Draw.

General information
- Location: Jackson Street and Erie Avenue, Rutherford, New Jersey
- Coordinates: 40.8422°N 74.1140°W
- Owner: Erie Railroad (c. 1870–1960); Erie–Lackawanna Railroad (1960–1966)
- Lines: Erie Railroad Main Line (1888–1963); Carlton Hill Branch (1963–1966)
- Platforms: 1 side platforms
- Tracks: 2 main line

Construction
- Platform levels: 1

Other information
- Station code: 2125

History
- Opened: c. 1870
- Closed: September 30, 1966
- Former names: Santiago Park (c. 1870–May 1874); West Rutherford (May 1874–1888)

Key dates
- 1965: Agency closed
- October 1967: Depot demolished

Former services
| Preceding station | Erie Railroad | Following station |
|---|---|---|
| Passaic Park toward Ridgewood | Main Line local stops | Rutherford toward Jersey City |
Location

Carlton Hill station is a defunct commuter railroad station in the Carlton Hill section of East Rutherford and Rutherford, Bergen County, New Jersey. Located on Jackson Street (County Route 507) at the junction with West Erie Avenue, trains at Carlton Hill station were operated by the Erie Railroad on its main line between Pavonia Terminal in Jersey City, New Jersey and Dearborn Station in Chicago, Illinois. The station was the first one west of Rutherford Junction, where the Bergen County Railroad (now the NJ Transit Bergen County Line) forked towards Ridgewood station. Carlton Hill station had two low-level side platforms with a wooden station depot on the eastbound platform.

Service in the area began with the opening of the Paterson and Hudson River Railroad from Passaic to Boiling Springs (modern-day Rutherford) on December 4, 1833. The first station in the area opened c. 1870 as Santiago Park. In late May 1874, the station name was changed to West Rutherford, a name it would hold until 1888 when it became Carlton Hill. The wooden station depot was built that year by the Erie Railroad. Railroad service on the main line continued until April 2, 1963, when the tracks were removed from Passaic station. All service west of Carlton Hill was eliminated, reducing service to a branch to Carlton Hill. The station agent eliminated in 1965. Service on the Carlton Hill Branch remained until September 30, 1966 as part of cuts by the Erie Lackawanna Railroad. The station depot at Carlton Hill was demolished in 1967.

== Station layout and services ==
Carlton Hill station was situated at the intersection with Jackson Avenue in Rutherford, where the Erie Railroad's main line crossed, 10.75 miles (17.30 km) away from New York City's Chambers Street Ferry Terminal. The main line crossed through Carlton Hill on two tracks, separated by inter-track fencing. There was one main line platform, next to the station depot, which was located on the eastbound side of the tracks. During the morning commuter rush, Carlton Hill was full of commuters heading for New York City. After the commuter rush, a station agent's work was to inspect the yard and complete freight billing for the Royce Chemical Company. The yard commonly had boxcars, empty and loaded waiting for pick-up. Although the station no longer gets use, the former site is accessible via New Jersey Transit's buses #160 and #190 along with a walk down to Jackson Avenue. The former station site and trackage are owned by Norfolk Southern Railway.

== History ==
=== Opening ===
Carlton Hill station was first constructed in 1888 as a 57-by-16-foot (17.4 m × 4.9 m) wooden structure at Jackson Avenue in Rutherford. The wooden station was the common design for station depots used by the Erie Railroad, designated Type IV. In 1889, upon opening of the station, formerly called West Rutherford, the station received eighteen trains from New York City and Jersey City daily, seventeen to New York City daily, and ten fewer trips on weekend each. The fare to get to Carlton Hill from Jersey City was $0.35 for one-way tickets, and $0.50 for round trips. The Erie's "Family Commutation Service", which was 50 trips, cost the rider $8.75.

The station was popular with holiday-goers heading to the resorts along the Passaic River, and the Rutherford Railway, a horsecar rail line existed for a few years

On September 6, 1911, a woman named Elizabeth King was struck and killed by an Erie Railroad passenger train at Carlton Hill. The woman, heading to Passaic to visit her daughter in the local hospital for an operation, was of poor eyesight and was unable to see the train. At the time, the Erie had not implemented intertrack fencing, but the intersection with Jackson Avenue had been given flashing lights and bells to signify the oncoming train. After the incident, the New Jersey State Legislature got involved with the case and gave the Erie suggestions to add intertrack fencing at Carlton Hill to prevent another such incident.

=== 1945 gas release incident ===
Commuters on a westbound train passing through Carlton Hill on August 17, 1945 were overcome by a sudden release of noxious sulfur dioxide fumes. During the draining of the sulfur dioxide from a tank car to Royce Chemical's storage tanks, a hose split in half and the workers failed to close the valve on the tank car, resulting in the fumes spreading throughout the Carlton Hill area. When the passenger train stopped at Carlton Hill, the locomotive was adjacent to the leaking tank car. The sulfur dioxide fumes were drawn into the passenger cars, causing an immediate panic among the riders, who rushed for the exits. W.S. Osborne, an off-duty engineer for the Erie, was in one of the passenger cars and ran to the locomotive to find out what was going on. In the cab, he found the crew lying unconscious on the floor. In response, Osborne took control of the throttle and immediately reversed the train out of the area of the tank car, reducing the exposure to the fumes.

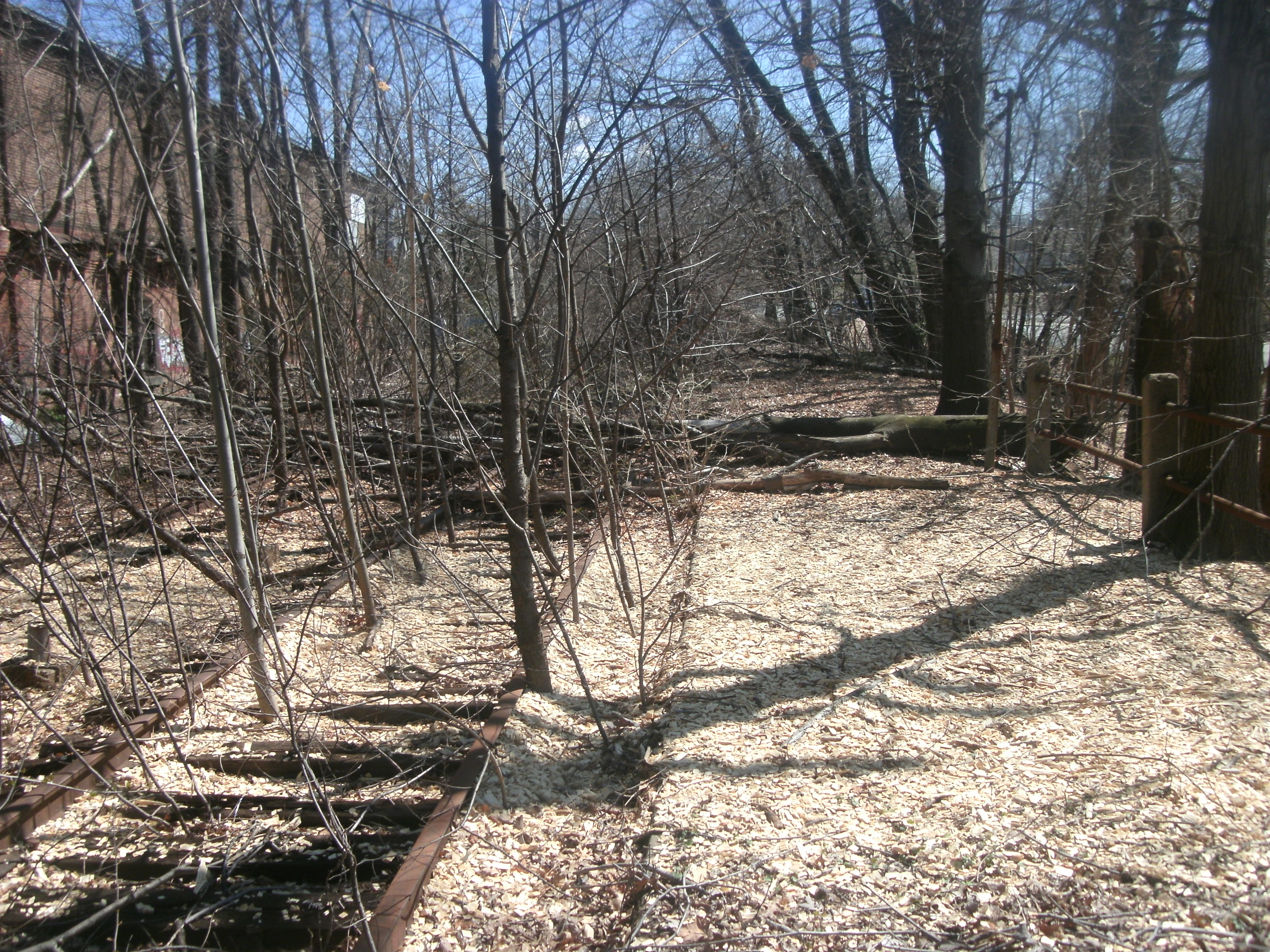
Carlton Hill station in March 2011, 45 years after the station closed. The partially overgrown tracks of the old Erie Railroad main line are visible along the deteriorating platform

As fumes from the tank car continued to spread, workers at the nearby Standard Bleachery began to feel the effects of the sulfur dioxide. There, another immediate panicked rush for the exits occurred as emergency response began to arrive. Several passengers were treated by Dr. Howard Cooper, a local police surgeon in Rutherford. Four people were brought to St. Mary's Hospital in Passaic, Morris Burlinger, a passenger on the train and Jessie Thomson, a local resident overcome by fumes, along with two members of the unconscious train crew: Martin Hein, the engineer, and the conductor, S.A. Smith. The fireman, R. Rensch, was treated and released at the scene.

The spread of the sulfur dioxide also caused property damage in the Carlton Hill area. Residents of Rutherford and East Rutherford, demanding answers from the Royce Chemical Company and the Erie Railroad, noted that the fumes had killed numerous trees in the area and had decimated multiple gardens. Mayor John Petrie of Rutherford brought up a letter he had sent in 1942 to the State Board of Health demanding Royce Chemical clean up its area in Carlton Hill. A local policeman from East Rutherford noted that there had been previous incidents of gas fumes, but nothing as severe as the August 17 incident. Albert Royce Jr., President of Royce Chemical, denied that sulfur dioxide was poisonous, stating it was only a rotten egg odor rather than anything serious, despite the reports of nine incapacitated by the noxious fumes.

However, by August 22, it was reported that three more people had been injured by the noxious fumes. Ernest Ericson, a resident of Passaic, also had to be taken to Beth Israel Hospital in Passaic on August 19, diagnosed with double pneumonia caused by exposure to the fumes. Ericson had been driving down Carlton Avenue in the area on the day of the gas attack. His wife, Ann, reported her husband's condition on August 21 to the police in Rutherford. James Petosa and Leonard Di Fouggia, residents of Newark also reported their health issues to Rutherford police. Petosa and Di Fouggia, who both had to be treated by doctors, were passing by Carlton Hill station on August 17 when they inhaled the fumes, bringing the total of victims to 12.

=== Passaic Plan and closing ===
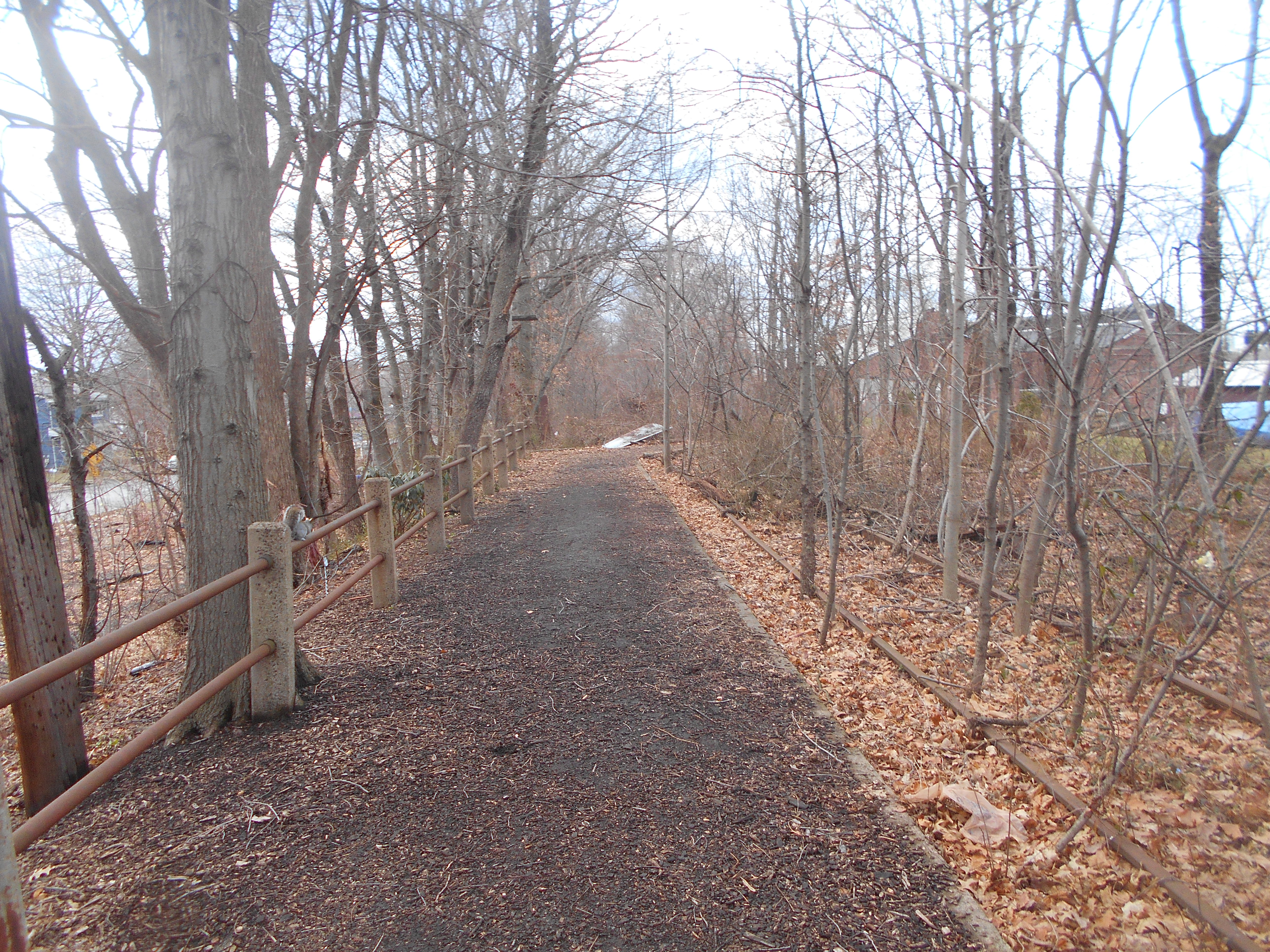
Carlton Hill station site in January 2015, mostly cleared

During the 1950s and 1960s, several different priorities from different agencies around the cities of Paterson and Passaic were beginning to form. The Delaware, Lackawanna and Western, a competing railroad with the Erie with a nearby parallel route from the Hudson waterfront to Paterson, wanted to combine services and share trackage with the Erie because of financial troubles. Secondly, the city officials in Passaic had proposed to the Erie to remove the main line tracks through the city's downtown Main Street shopping district, since traffic jams would occur every time a train stopped at the Passaic station. This, however, was not implemented during the 1950s, as proposed. Instead, the Erie reconstructed the stations at Passaic and Clifton. Third, the New Jersey State Highway Department needed rights-of-way for Interstate 80 through Paterson and State Route 21 through Passaic (right where Passaic Park station and BE Drawbridge were located).

After the Erie and Lackawanna merged on October 17, 1960, the city officials in Passaic reiterated their Main Street track-removal request. This time, the newly formed Erie–Lackawanna went forward with it, beginning the process to move its main line onto the former Boonton Branch through Lyndhurst, Passaic and Clifton. The main line was abandoned past Carlton Hill, and BE Drawbridge was swung in the open position. The bridge was soon put up for sale price of $0.00 in 1964 by the mayor of Passaic.

After the abandonment of the Erie Railroad's main line through the city of Passaic, the two-tracked stub from Rutherford and Bergen Junction westward through Carlton Hill remained in service as the Carlton Hill Branch. This alignment received most of the deadhead trains, but there was a limited set of Carlton Hill – Rutherford – Hoboken trains, making only those two stops. In October 1966, along with the Newark Branch and the spur of the New York & Greenwood Lake to Wanaque, the Carlton Hill Branch service were discontinued and the station no longer received passenger trains. The station building was later demolished, and only the tracks and asphalt platform remain to this date at Jackson Avenue.

The station depot was razed in October 1967, a year after service ended after falling into a state of disrepair and complaints from local residents.

== Bibliography ==
- Lucas, Walter Arndt (1944). From the Hills to the Hudson: A History of the Paterson and Hudson River Rail Road and its Associates, the Paterson and Ramapo, and the Union Railroads. New York, New York: The Cornwall Press. hdl:2027/uc1.b4536228.
- Yanosey, Robert J. (2006). Erie Railroad Facilities (In Color). Vol. 1: New Jersey. Scotch Plains, New Jersey: Morning Sun Books Inc. ISBN 1-58248-183-0.
