= West Essex Trail =

Hiking trail in New Jersey, United States

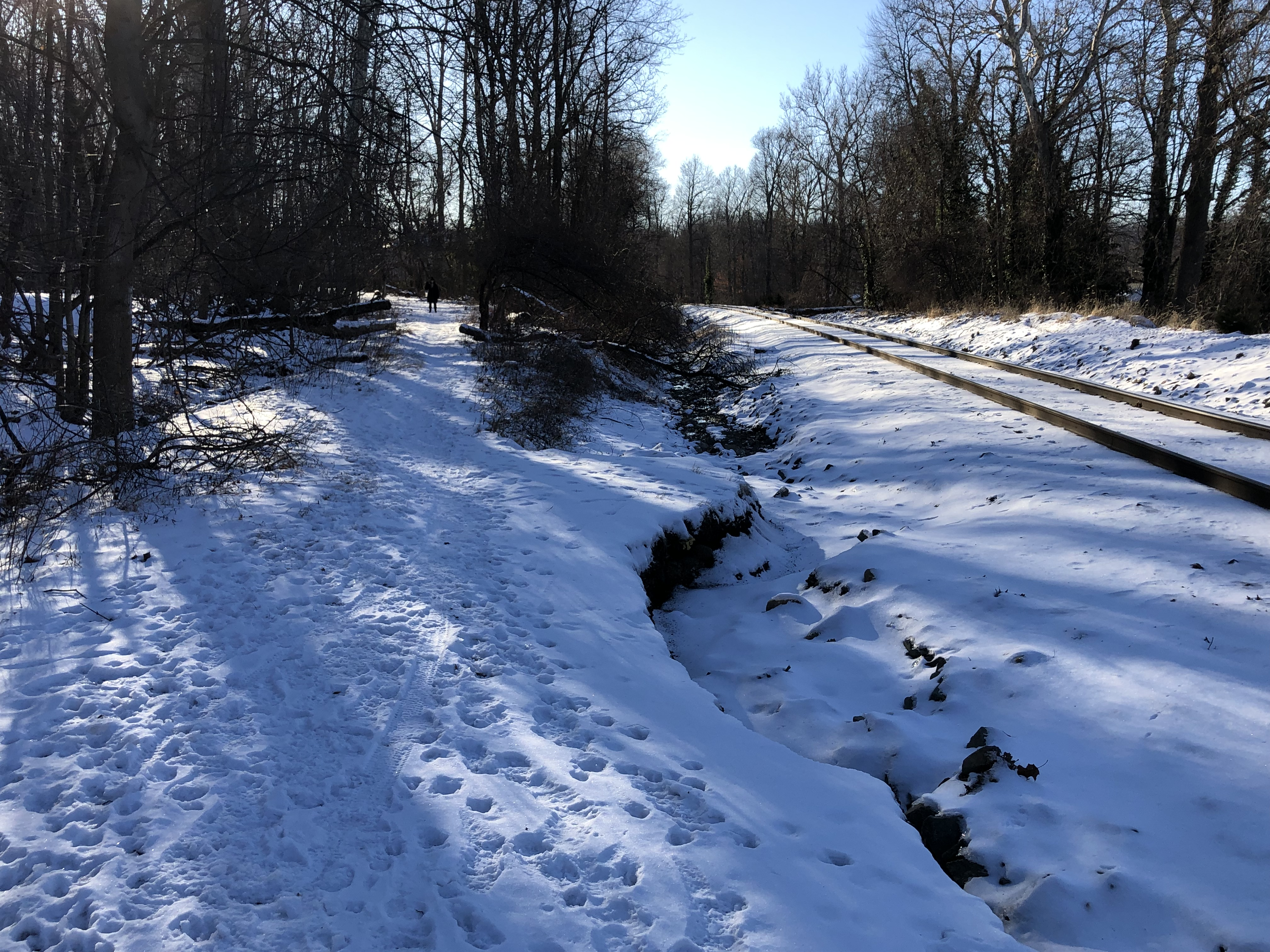
The northern trailhead of the West Essex Trail is located where the Erie Railroad Caldwell Branch split from the still active Montclair Branch. The trail can be seen in the left of the image. Image taken at 40°52'21.0"N 74°12'38.9"W facing west.

The West Essex Trail is a former railroad track bed of the Erie Lackawanna Railroad Caldwell Branch now hiking trail located mostly in Essex County, New Jersey in the United States, with a small section in Passaic County, New Jersey.

== Background ==
The northern trailhead is located where the Erie Lackawanna Caldwell Branch rail line split from the still active Montclair Branch. Proceeding south the trail crosses County Route 612 in Little Falls at 0.2 miles (0.32 km). 1 mile (1.6 km) from the trailhead, the trail merges with the Lenape Trail before crossing Bowden Road. At 1.5 miles (2.4 km) the trail crosses the Peckman River on the old railroad bridge before crossing Pompton Avenue (Route 23), where there are remnants of the old Erie Railroad Cedar Grove station on the south side of the tracks and stairs leading down to Pompton Avenue. The trail crosses Keeney Street in Verona at 2.4 miles (3.9 km). Just north of Keeney Street was the Erie Railroad Overbrook station. Lastly the trail crosses Durrell Street in Verona, New Jersey at 2.7 miles (4.3 km) before terminating at the southern trailhead located on Fairview Ave in Verona. The rail bed continues through Verona passing under Bloomfield Avenue (the tunnel has since been filled in), Essex Fells and Roseland before rejoining active rail lines in Roseland at Interstate 280. The trail is mixed use and available for walking, hiking, biking, and jogging. Along the trail one can find remnants of the old railroad line including mile markers, railroad ties, power lines, and signal boxes.

== Gallery ==
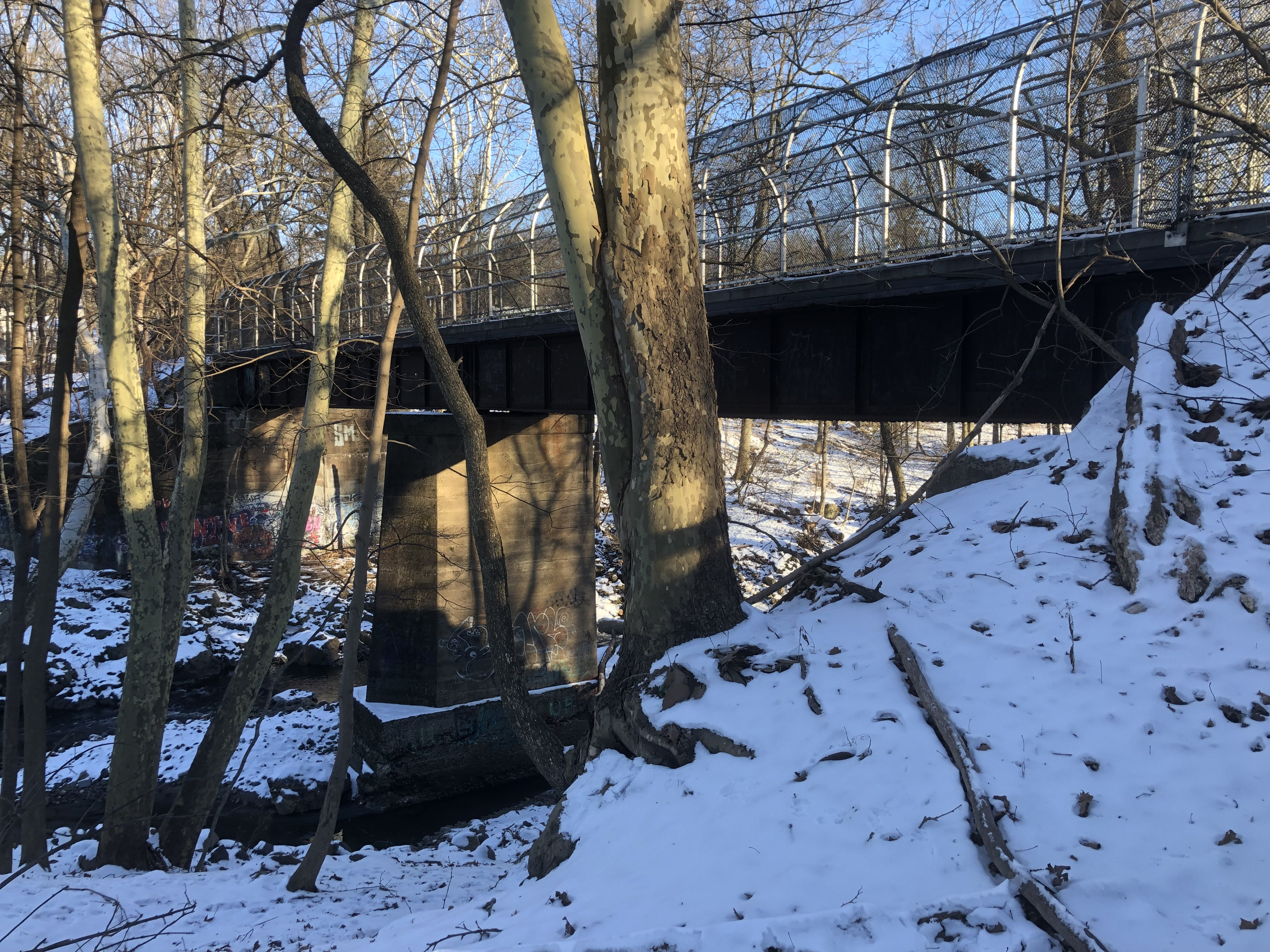
The West Essex Trail crosses the Peckman River using the old Erie Railroad bridge. The original bridge was washed out following a storm in 1945. This bridge was constructed soon after. Image taken at 40°51'18.3"N 74°13'43.4"W facing east.

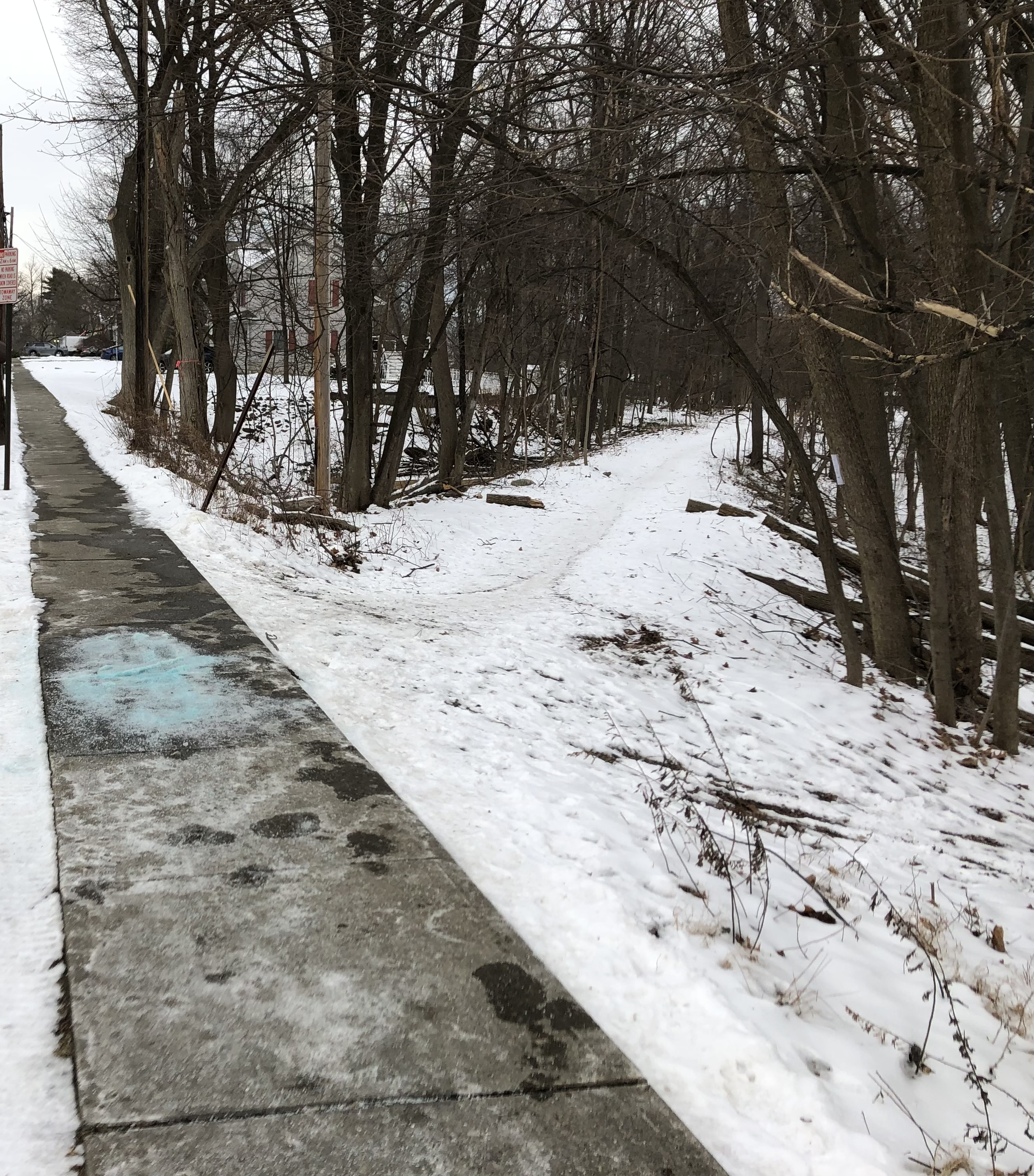
The West Essex Trail terminates at its southern trailhead where it intersects Fairview Avenue in Verona, NJ. Image taken at 40°50'34.9"N 74°14'51.6"W facing north east.

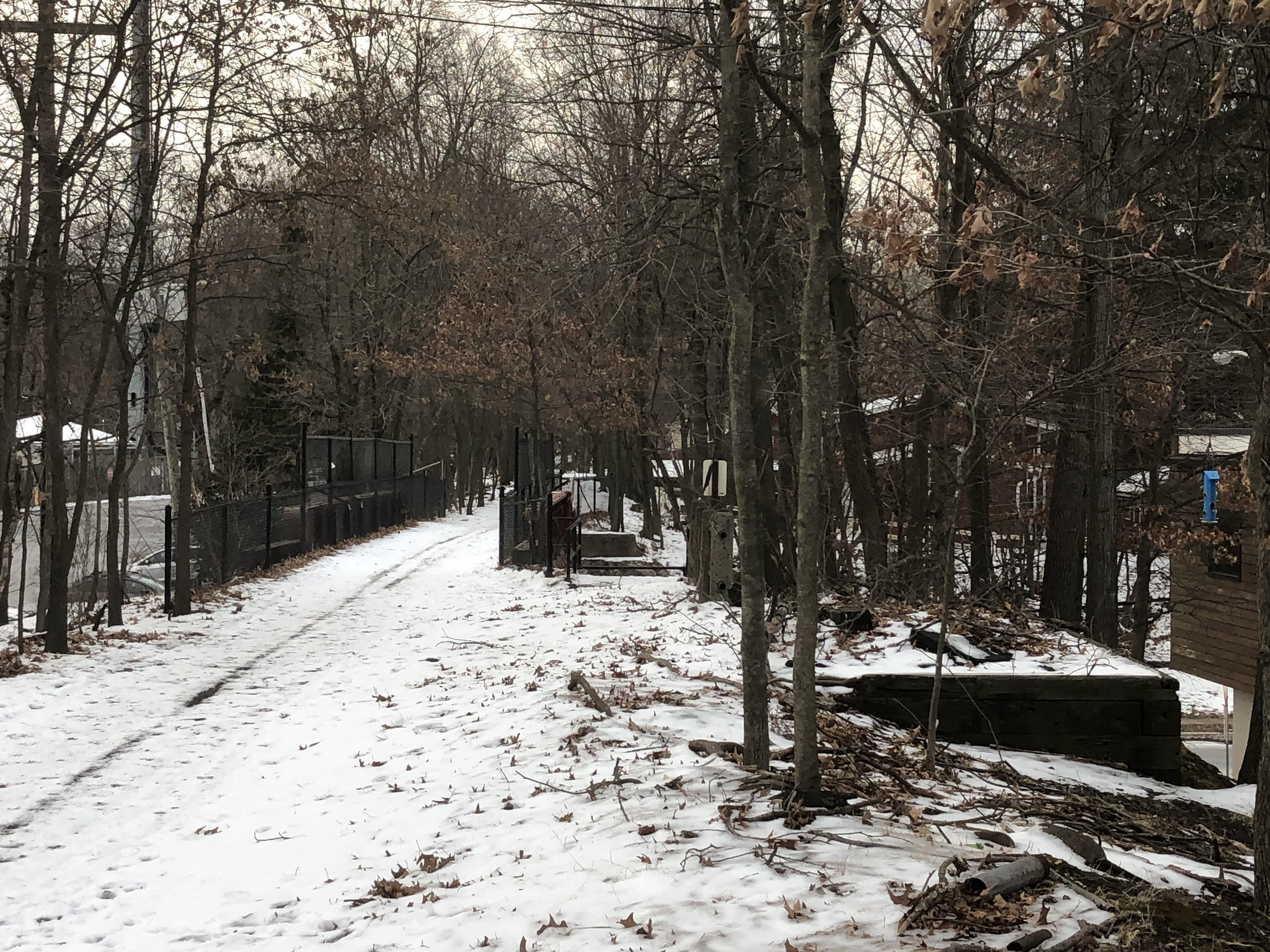
Remnants of the Erie Railroad Cedar Grove station can be found on the West Side of Pompton Avenue (Route 23). In this image only the wooden foundation can be seen to the right of the rail bed. Image taken at 40°51'18.0"N 74°13'49.5"W facing east.

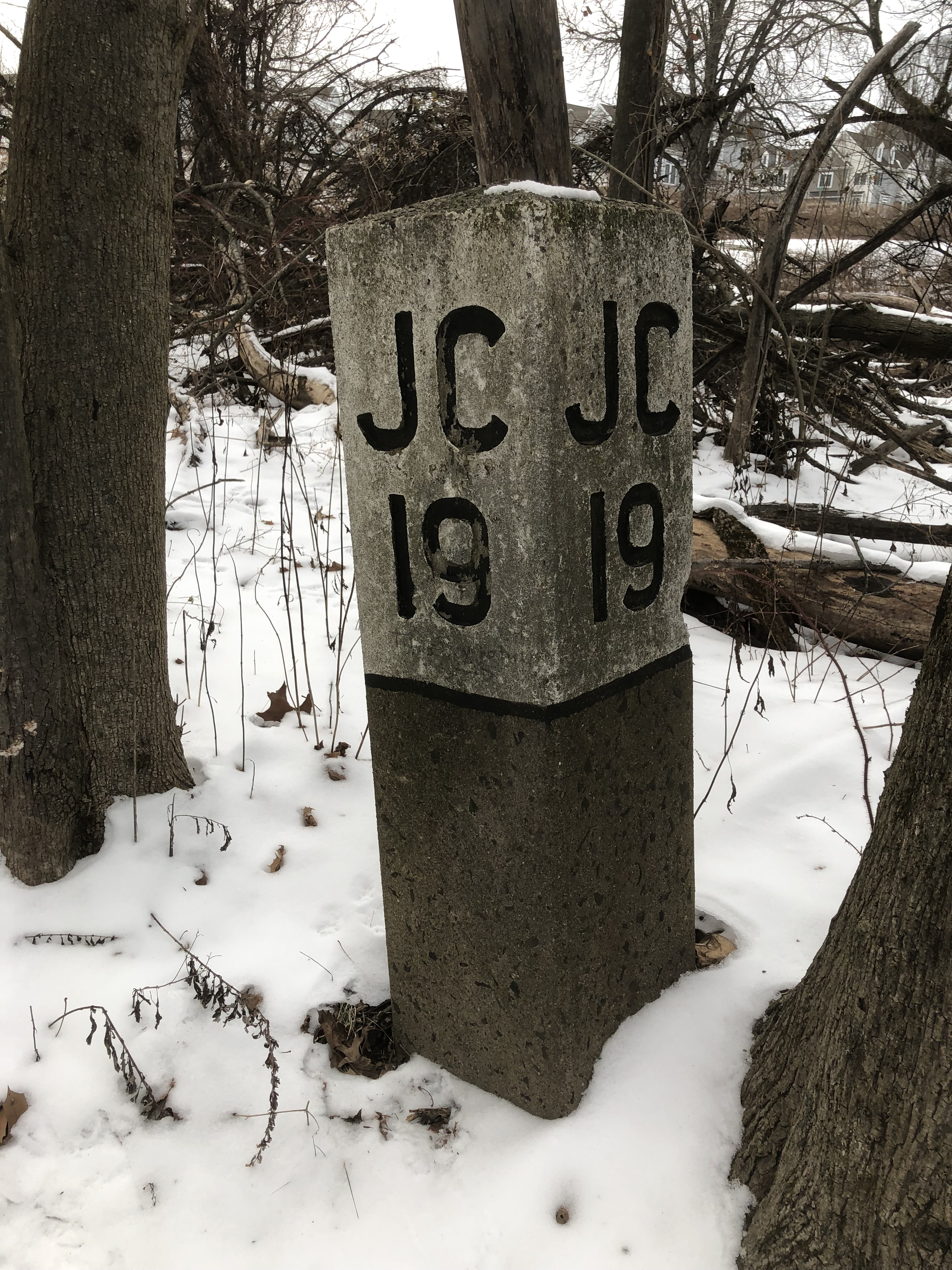
Erie Railroad Caldwell Branch mile marker denoting 19 miles (31 km) to Jersey City

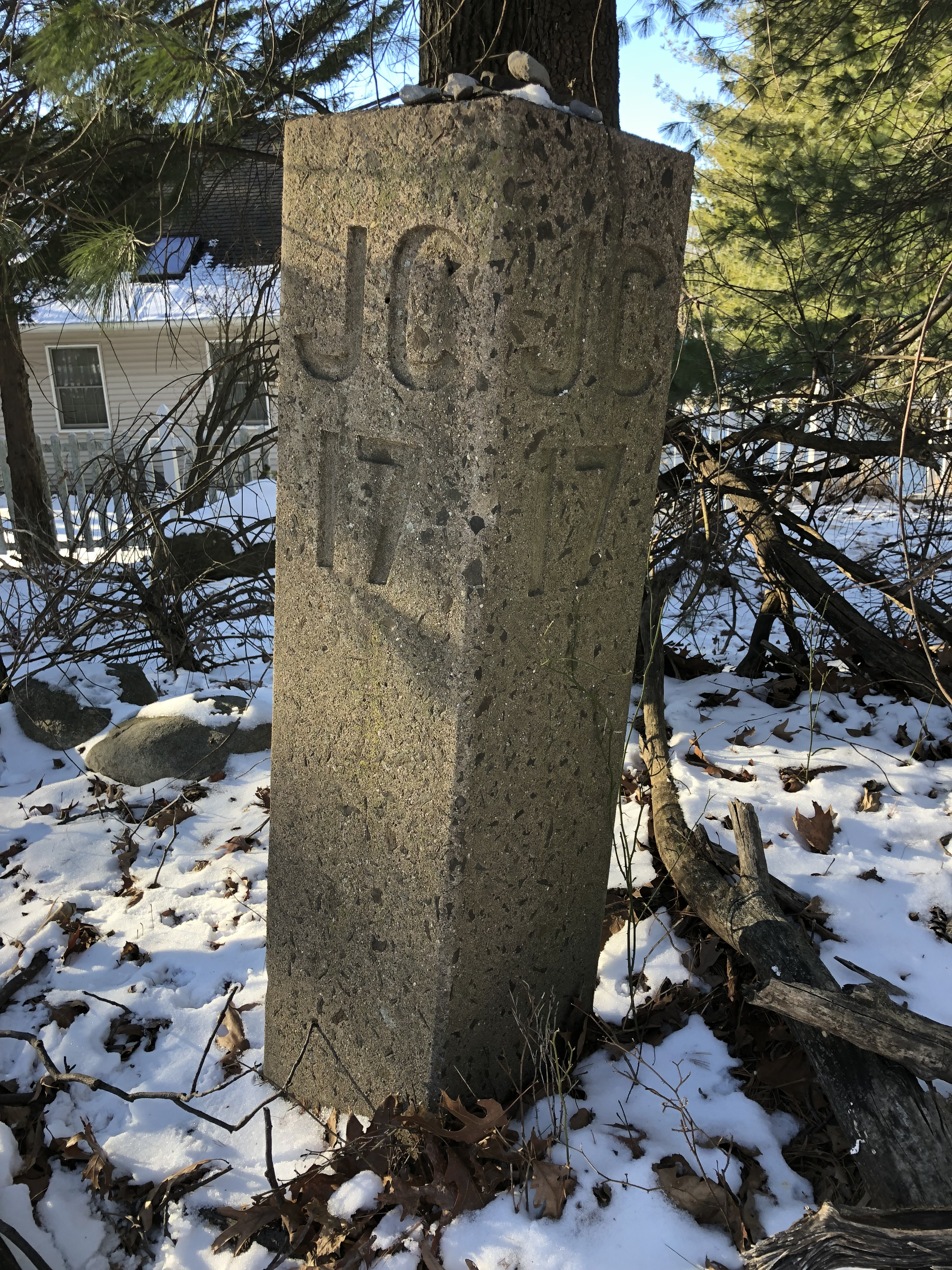
Erie Railroad Caldwell Branch mile marker denoting 17 miles (27 km) to Jersey City. Image taken at 40°52'13.1"N 74°12'47.6"W facing north west.

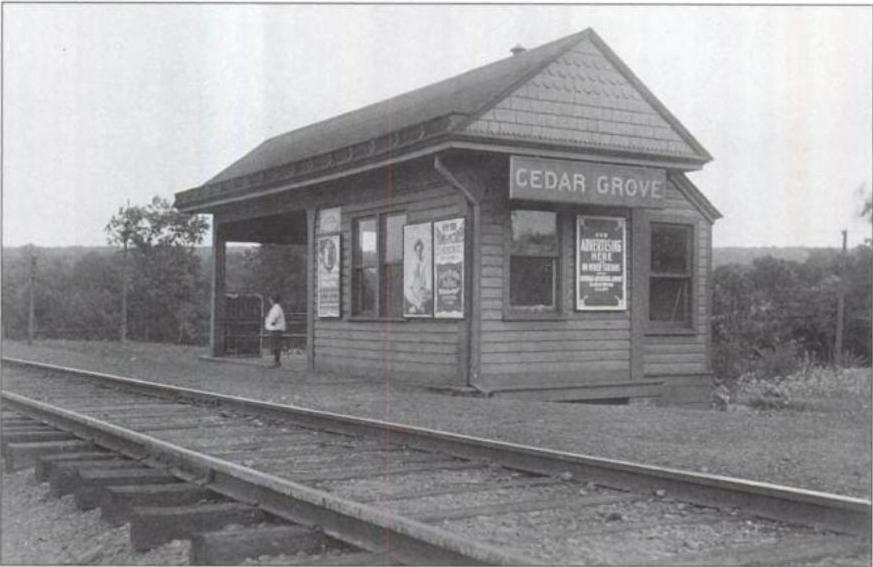
Erie Railroad Cedar Grove station in 1909
