= Peckman River =

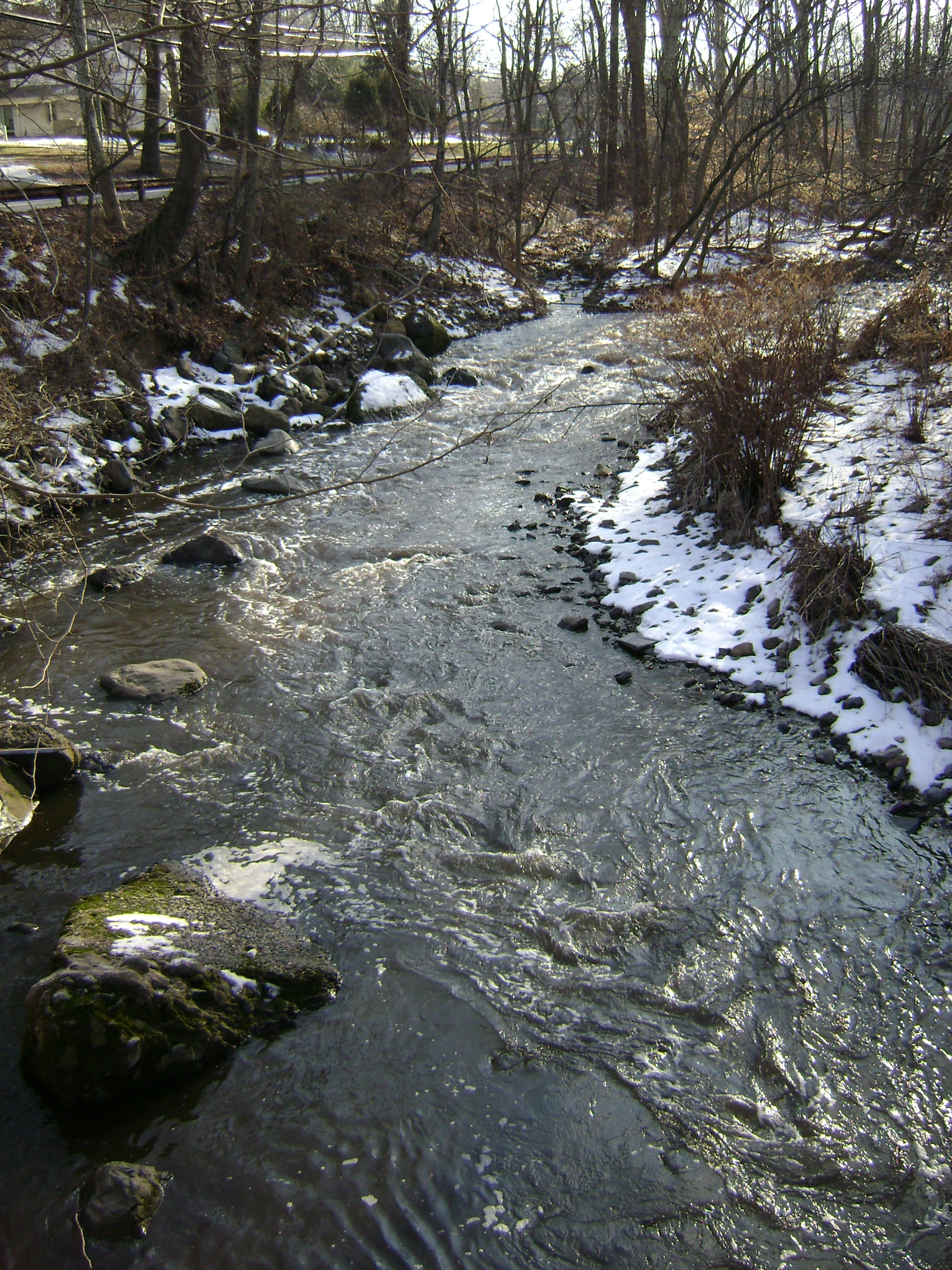
- Peckman River viewed from Commerce Road in Cedar Grove

Location
- Country: United States
- State: New Jersey
- Counties: Passaic, Essex

Physical characteristics
- Source
  - location: Eagle Rock Reservation, West Orange, Essex County, New Jersey, United States
  - coordinates: 40°48′28.67″N 74°14′18.54″W
  - elevation: 624 ft (190 m)
- Mouth: Passaic River
  - location: Woodland Park, Passaic County, New Jersey, United States
  - coordinates: 40°53′36.69″N 74°12′49.50″W
  - elevation: 119 ft (36 m)
- Length: 8.5 mi (13.7 km)

The Peckman River is a tributary of the Passaic River in Essex and Passaic Counties, New Jersey in the United States.

The Peckman River originates in the township of West Orange and flows northeasterly through the townships of Verona, Cedar Grove and Little Falls to its confluence with the Passaic River in the borough of Woodland Park (formerly West Paterson).

== Devil's Hole ==
The Peckman River passes through a number of suburban areas en route from its narrow and shallow start at Eagle Rock Reservation in West Orange. Few features define the waterway save for a short waterfall and pool, known as Devil's Hole, located in Cedar Grove and which is used locally as a swimming hole. The falls were created by the addition of Van Orden's Dam during the Dutch settlement of the region. Historians state that the water from Devil's Hole previously powered a steam boiler at the Van Orden Corset Company factory south of the site. On June 18, 2014, a teenager from Newark, NJ drowned while swimming in the hole. Swimming in Devil's Hole was banned by a local ordinance in 2018.

== Flooding ==
As a tributary of the Passaic River, the Peckman River has been the subject of frequently flooding, particularly from the mid-2000s. The United States Army Corps of Engineers attributes this flooding to an increase in storms and heavy rainfall, which exceed the drainage capacity of the surrounding area. The USACE notes that recent floods have degraded the ecology of Passaic River Basin, largely as a result of erosion, and consistent with the long-term impact seen in watersheds which are heavily urbanized. Moreover, development throughout the region has reduced the drainage capacity of the basin.

== See also ==
- List of rivers of New Jersey
