= Passaic (disambiguation) =

Passaic is a New Jersey city.

Passaic may also refer to:

== Places ==
- Passaic, Missouri, a village in Bates County
- Passaic County, New Jersey
- Passaic River, a river in northern New Jersey
- Glacial Lake Passaic, a prehistoric proglacial lake in New Jersey
- Passaic Township, renamed to Long Hill Township in 1992

== Stations ==
- Passaic (NJT station), in New Jersey
- Passaic station (Erie Railroad), in New Jersey
- Passaic Park station (Erie Railroad), in New Jersey
- Passaic Bus Terminal, in New Jersey

== Ships ==
- USS Passaic (1862), a single turreted, coastal monitor
- USS Passaic (AN-87), a Cohoes-class net laying ship
- USS Pontiac (YT-20) or USS Passaic (YT-20), a harbor tugboat
