= USS Pontiac (YT-20) =

Tugboat of the United States Navy

History

United States
- Name: USS Pontiac
- Namesake: After Ottawa native American chief Pontiac
- Builder: Peter McGishan, Athens, New York
- Laid down: 1891
- Christened: as Right Arm
- Acquired: by the Navy, 23 April 1898
- Commissioned: USS Pontiac, 1 July 1911
- Decommissioned: 1921
- Renamed: Pontiac, 23 April 1898
- Reclassified: District Harbor Tug (YT-20), 17 July 1920
- Stricken: est. 1921
- Homeport: New York Harbor
- Fate: Sold, 25 February 1922

General characteristics
- Type: District harbor tug
- Displacement: 401 tons
- Length: 124 ft 4 in (37.90 m)
- Beam: 27 ft (8.2 m)
- Draft: 9 ft 6 in (2.90 m)
- Propulsion: not known
- Speed: 10.5 knots
- Complement: not known
- Armament: Two 1-pounder guns; One AA machine gun

USS Pontiac (YT-20) was a harbor tugboat purchased by the U.S. Navy during World War I. She was assigned to the New York Harbor area and performed her towing tasks there until war’s end. Post-war she was found to be excess to needs and sold.

== Built in Athens, New York ==
The second ship to be so named by the U.S. Navy, Pontiac was laid down as Right Arm in 1891 by Peter McGishan, Athens, New York; purchased by the Navy from Merritt & Chapman 23 April 1898; renamed Pontiac 23 April.

Pontiac served in harbors along the north Atlantic Ocean coast of the United States. She operated in yards such as New York, New York; Boston, Massachusetts; New London, Connecticut; and, Charleston, South Carolina.

== World War I service ==
Pontiac commissioned 1 July 1911. During World War I, she concentrated efforts at New York City, a major center for domestic and foreign commerce. She was renamed Passaic 11 April 1918.

== Post-war decommissioning ==
Continuing harbor and district tug operations after the war, she decommissioned and was placed on the sale list in 1921. She was sold to John Kantzler & Sons, Bay City, Michigan, 25 February 1922.
