= Passaic station (Erie Railroad) =

Former train station in Passaic, New Jersey

Passaic
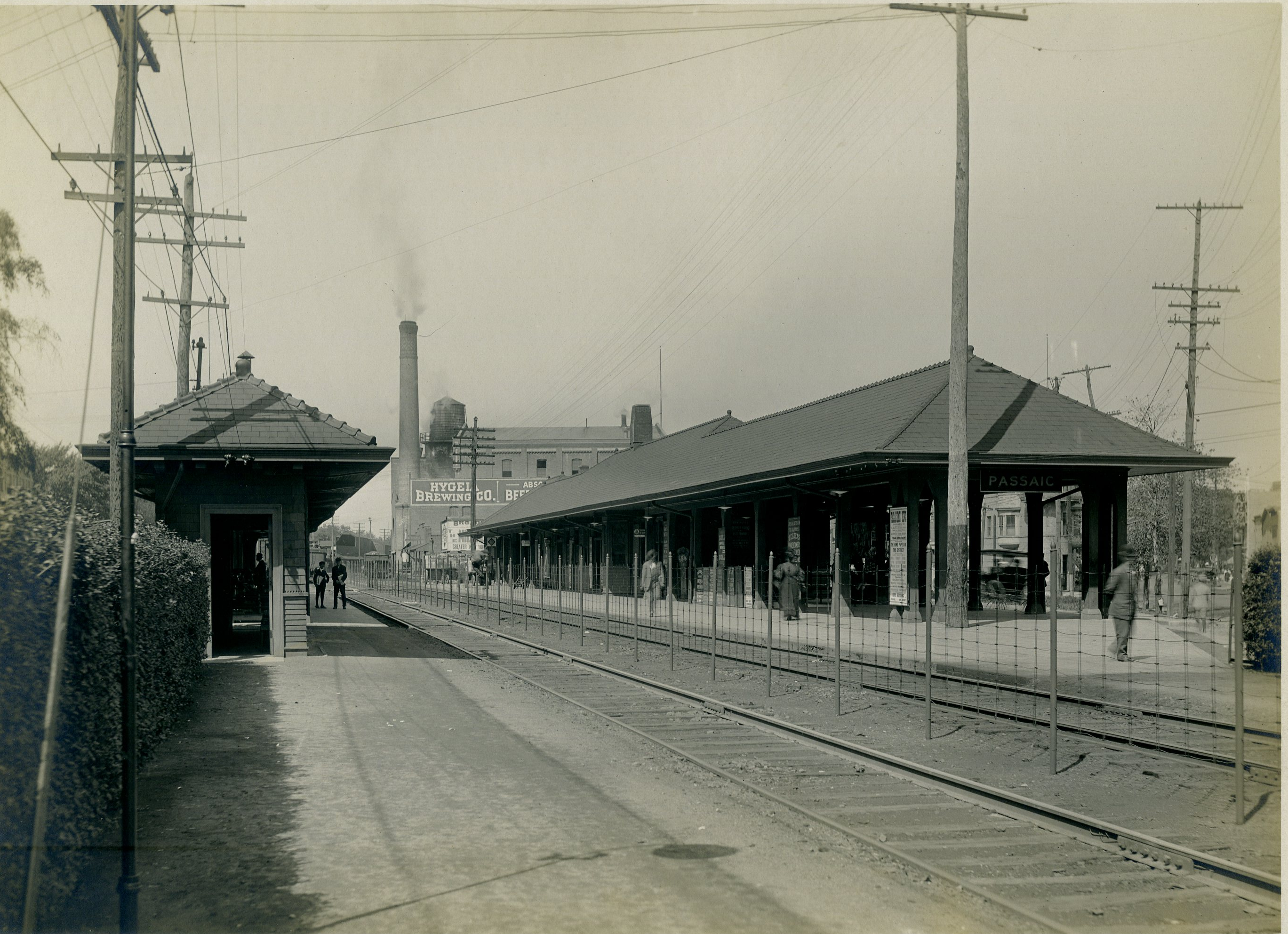
- Passaic station in December 1909.

General information
- Location: Main Street and Jefferson Street, Passaic, New Jersey
- Coordinates: 40.8627°N 74.1277°W
- Owner: Paterson and Hudson River Railroad (May 28, 1832–September 10, 1852); Erie Railroad (September 10, 1852–October 17, 1960); Erie-Lackawanna Railway (October 17, 1960–April 2, 1963)
- Line: Erie Railroad Main Line
- Platforms: 2 side platforms
- Tracks: 2 main line

Construction
- Platform levels: 1

Other information
- Station code: 2131

History
- Opened: May 28, 1832
- Closed: April 2, 1963
- Rebuilt: May 10, 1868; March 9, 1928; 1954–November 1954
- Former names: Acquackanonk (May 28, 1832–1851); Huyler's (1851–April 25, 1854)

Key dates
- December 22, 1926: 1878 station depot burns
- April 1954: 1928 station depot razed
- September 1972: 1954 station depot razed

Former services
Preceding station	Erie Railroad	Following station
Paterson toward Chicago	Main Line	Rutherford toward Jersey City
Harrison Street toward Ridgewood	Main Line local stops	Prospect Street toward Jersey City
Location

Passaic station was a railway station for the Erie Railroad in downtown Passaic, New Jersey. The station sat in the center of Main Street at the corner of Madison Street. Though there were three other stations in the city—Prospect Street and Passaic Park to the east, and Harrison Street to the west—the simply named Passaic station was the primary station for the city, located at grade in the busiest section of its main business street.

== History ==
=== Construction and opening (1829–1832) ===
Proposals for a railroad through Acquackanonk Township came in 1829 when an appeal was made to the New Jersey State Legislature. Members of the town of Paterson and multiple manufacturers petitioned the Legislature to approve a new railroad to help transport goods to the Hudson River. Roswell Colt, a local industrialist, worked with engineer John Sullivan to help design and imagine a new railroad through the area the year prior. Due to a recent economic depression, manufacturers found it important to ship their products in winter months, which was difficult when local roads were obstructed and/or closed. Seeing the benefit of railroads in Europe, they felt a railroad should be built between Paterson and New York City since it could run all year, unlike stagecoach travel. Paterson officials also noted that the railroad would help communities outside municipal limits, bringing more manufacturers. Agricultural conveyors would also have the benefit of being able to ship to other places instead of delivering via stagecoach.

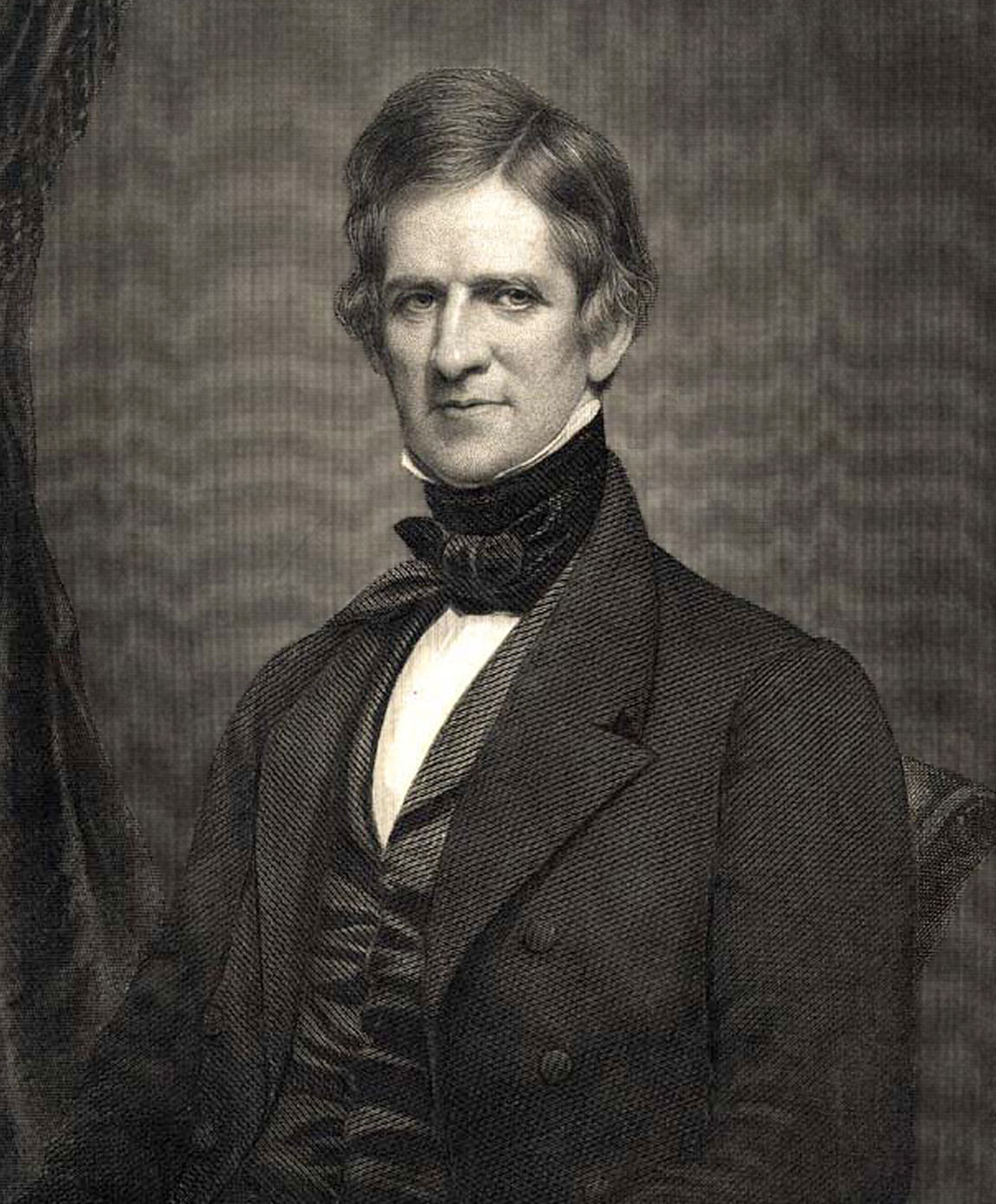
Philemon Dickerson, one of the members of the town of Paterson advocated for the railroad

The new railroad would begin in Paterson and cross through Acquackanonk Township, where it would cross the Passaic River via a drawbridge into Berry's Hill (later Carlton Hill). The railroad then would cross the Hackensack River, through Bergen Ridge into a location that would reach the ferries in both Hoboken and nearby Jersey City.

Despite the locals saying they would equally benefit from the completion of the Morris Canal, then under construction, the Morris Canal did file a letter to the Legislature on January 11, 1830, that noted their opposition to the railroad project. Feeling that they were aligned into Paterson because of some arm-wrangling, the canal company called the Legislature ignorant of these issues and that the railroad would not meet the same financial efficiency the canal would, despite that the stagecoach being eliminated would eliminate as much as $30,000 (1830 USD) in costs for locals. The Morris Canal and Banking Company also noted that there were protections built into the incorporation preventing them from "undue competition". However, those were written as competition from rival canals. The company used the same argument with the railroad, which would run near the canal. They also objected, suggesting that it would obstruct the flow of the Passaic and Hackensack rivers.

Those in support of the railroad did respond in the Paterson Intelligencer, noting that their arguments were invalid due to the "undue competition" clause only focusing on rival canalway construction. Noting that, they pressured the Legislature to fall on their side and grant them a charter for construction of the new railroad.

On February 5, 1830, a meeting was held in Paterson where they made multiple official resolutions. The first would note that they wanted the expedience on construction of the new railroad (if a charter was acquired). The second was to note that they denied the claims of the Morris Canal and Banking Company about "injurously affecting the interests." Their notes were to find that the railroad would help benefit the canal. They also noted that they needed a railroad because it would provide the cheaper transportation options in winter, when the canal would be out of service at times due to weather. They also assigned a committee to help get the job done.

It would take a third try for the railroad to get a charter from the Legislature. This occurred on January 31, 1831, when the Paterson and Hudson River Railroad Company came into existence. The railroad was granted the right to build then operate a railroad from the town of Paterson to a point on the Hudson River. However, the incorporation did not take effect until February 3. Subscriptions (equity investments) to help pay for the new railroad were solicited to be delivered by March 2 at the Passaic Hotel in Paterson. The response to the opening of railroad subscriptions was positive, with the $50 shares being overwhelmed. Future Governor of New Jersey Philemon Dickerson became the first president of the railroad.

Construction began on April 22 when the railroad surveyors began planning out the route. This job was completed in June 1831, when they finished surveying the route from Paterson to Acquackanonk along with the route through the Boiling Springs area of Union Township (now Rutherford and East Rutherford, New Jersey) to the Meadowlands. On July 4, 1831, the ground was broken for construction of the railroad, starting with the terminal in Paterson. Brigadier General Abraham Godwin, a member of the town of Paterson group that was instrumental in obtaining the company a charter, signaled the start with a pickaxe, followed by Dickerson doing the first shoveling. Full construction began on July 11. The new railroad was made of iron tracks and wooden ties with a 4.833 feet (1.473 m) wide gauge.

Construction of the railroad between Acquackanonk and Paterson was completed on May 1, 1832. On May 28, railroad service commenced on the 4.5 miles (7.2 km) long stretch between Acquackanonk and Paterson. Railcars built by J.L. Young and Company of Newark were brought to the area and attached to horses at a barn at Main Avenue and Prospect Street. People as far as Sussex County rode down to look at the new red railroad cars in the barn. The opening was well-attended, with people crowding the platform in Acquackanonk, along with the car steps and the roofs of cars. The railroad, the second ever to operate in the state of New Jersey, was horse-driven, running at a rate of 20 miles per hour (32 km/h). By June 21, the railroad had six trains a day in each direction, starting at 7 am and ending at 7 pm, except for Sunday when it was 6 am to 7:30 pm.

=== Service expansion, station relocation and two renames (1832–1854) ===
With the railroad operating from Franklin's Crossing (the intersection of Main Avenue and Pennington Avenue in Passaic) to Paterson, expansion was inevitable. Construction continued east through Acquackanonk to get service out to the Hudson River. Service crossed the Passaic River into Boiling Springs in 1832. Construction of the railroad was underway by January 1833. By November 13, the Paterson Intelligencer noted that the railroad would likely open for expanded service to the Bergen Hill section of Jersey City around December 1. However, the first train to Jersey City came on November 19, 1833, with regular service commencing on November 24. On October 20, 1834, service was expanded to the area known as Marion Junction, reaching the Hudson River.

In April 1835, the McNeill, a steam engine, reached New Jersey from England, built by Robert Stephenson and Company of Newcastle. It came into service in June 1835, resulting in the mix of steam engines and horse-driven railcars. The steam engine from Jersey City was an express, only making stops in Acquackanonk and Paterson, skipping Passaic Bridge and Boiling Spring. After a new locomotive, Whistler, was acquired, horse service was discontinued at the end of 1835, with the horses going up for auction on January 9, 1836.

By early 1838, there was local approval and requests to continue the railroad from Paterson to the New York state line where it would meet the New York and Erie Railroad, which was built through Rockland County. In 1831, after the Paterson and Hudson River Railroad was chartered, a group reached out to petition for a railroad from Paterson on north. The bill was passed on November 30, and a charter was created for the Ramapo and Paterson Railroad. However, no railroad was ever built and the charter expired. In November 1840, a new petition was filed by the Paterson and Hudson River to have their charter amended for an extension to Ramapo, New York. The proposal was then split out into its own company; Governor William Pennington signed the amended charter bill on March 10, 1841, creating the Paterson and Ramapo Railroad. Like the predecessor railroad, the Paterson and Ramapo would have $50 shares, with a capital stock of $400,000. Construction of this railroad began on June 16, 1847, with the survey already completed. Progress was made quickly through 1847 and 1848, with the expectation on February 15, 1848, that the railroad could be opened by July 1. Service on the railroad commenced on October 19, 1848, providing access to the New York and Lake Erie Railroad through Acquackanonk.

Locations of Passaic station 1832–1963

That year, the Passaic station, which was just an old freight car, was moved from its location at Prospect Street to the Road to the Point, which ran along modern day Park Place. This move brought the station in front of the People's Bank Building on Main Avenue, where Cornelius Huyler operated a saloon. This saloon, commonly known as The Tap House on the Hill, also contained a lunch room. Running from owner to owner, the business was poor and Huyler moved on, becoming the ticket agent for the railroad at Acquackanonk. By April 1851, the station was renamed from Acquackanonk to Huyler's.

On September 9–10, 1852, ownership of the railroads, along with the Union Railroad (a New York entity), came under the control of the New York and Erie Railroad via a lease. The Whistler and the McNeill along with 2 other locomotives, Passaic and Paterson, were given to the Erie as part of the deal. By November 1853, the New York and Erie railroad established new 6 feet (1.8 m) track along the line, completed on November 14 through Huyler's. On November 21, 1853, the first train ran between Jersey City and the Erie's terminal in Dunkirk, New York.

In 1854, Albert Speer, a local resident, requested that the name of the community be changed from Acquackanonk to Passaic. The post office in Acquackanonk was known as Acquackanonk, while the railroad station was Huyler's. At a meeting at the Eutaw House on modern-day River Drive on February 15, 1854, Speer brought up his complaints to the town officials, the locals wanted to stand with the name Acquackanonk over changing it to Passaic. However, Speer did get favorable townspeople to sign a petition for the post office to be renamed to Passaic from Acquackanonk. Speer brought the proposal to Washington, D.C., and got approval from the post office for the name change. On April 25, 1854, the name change went into effect on the railroad, but not after Speer and a few local residents went and made a sign denoting the new name. Speer changed the signs on Huyler's, replacing it with the handmade Passaic sign. With the railroad, who never protested, and the post office in cahoots on a new name, objection was not raised and the name of Passaic stood.

=== Station relocation, community development and near destruction (1862–1879) ===
In 1862, the station, which was still the old freight car, was moved from its location near The Road to the Point to a new location at 578 Main Avenue (from the south side of the crossing to the north side of the crossing at The Road to the Point). The railroad station being at 578 Main helped spur strong development around the area, including churches for five various denominations, new schools, a seminary school specifically for women, and multiple businesses for manufacturing. On June 21, 1865, a new group of lots were sold to help spur development in the city of Passaic around the railroad station and the nearby Passaic River. The station at 578 Main Avenue lasted for six years, as the railroad retired the freight car station on May 10, 1868. On that day, a new railroad station for the Main Avenue stop, opened in Passaic, located at Washington Place. This new station was 70 by 35 feet (21 m × 11 m) and of wooden frame design. The Erie would use this station as a model to develop the Anderson Street station in Hackensack, which was built in a similar way the next year (opening on September 9, 1869).

In 1869, a banker named Edo Kip (1815–1899), originally of Boiling Springs, bought at auction a 10-acre (4.0 ha) plot of land near Main Avenue along what is now the center of Passaic. There, Kip built his residence after moving from Rutherford, several blocks away from the railroad station on Main Avenue. The center of Passaic was at the time near the river around the Gregory Street bridge. Kip helped grade and open several streets in Passaic, including Madison Street and Elm Place, which both opened in 1869.

On June 21, 1873, Henry Gertie, 21, and Henry Jackson, 25, employees in a local horse stable on Washington Place, returned to the stable to sleep off a night of drinking alcohol. Both heavily intoxicated, they broke out a match to light what was suspected to be either a cigar or a lamp. While attempting to light, the match fell on the floor of the stables and ignited the structure. Six horses were also present in the stable when it caught fire. The fire quickly reached the nearby Acquackanonck House, which erupted, despite the best efforts of local firefighters. When the Acquackanonck House erupted, an alarm was sent via telegraph to Paterson to get help to put out the flames, expected to eat the entire block of buildings. The Erie also assisted, bringing members of one Paterson crew to Passaic by rail, a 6-mile (9.7 km) trip.

The Acquackanonck House was located across from the Erie station in Passaic and caught fire multiple times. The telegraph operator at the station removed his telegraphed from the wall and took all the papers and tickets from the station that he could in case the station became a total loss from the fire. However, it is believed that the station depot's sanded paint protected the structure from burning completely, along with the fact that there was no wind through the area at that time period.

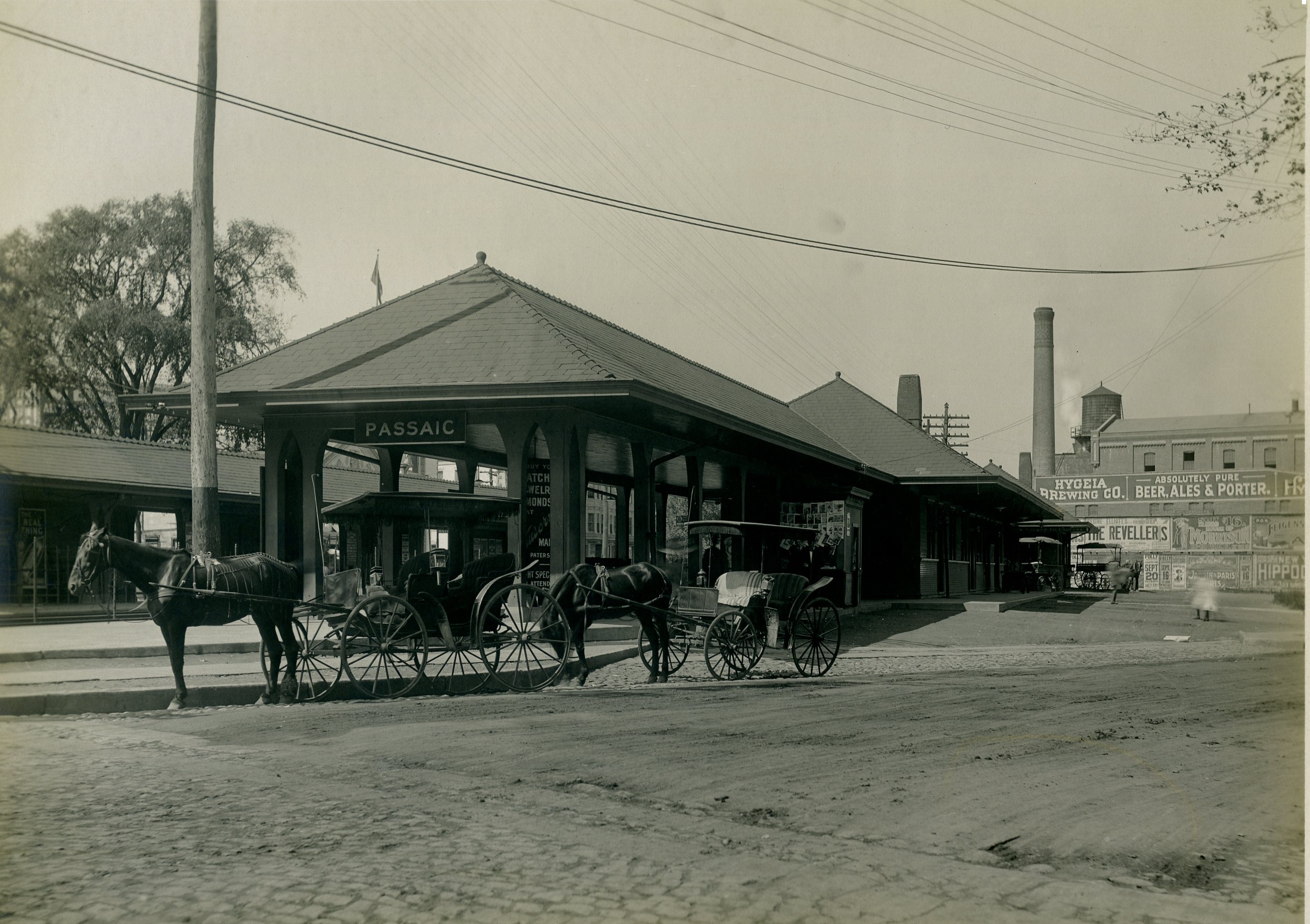
The 1878-built Passaic station, c. 1907–1912

However, the station depot was one of the few, if not only, building saved on that block of Railroad Avenue and Washington Place. Paterson fire crews demolished several buildings to help prevent the spread of the fast-moving fire. The Acquackanonck House was a complete loss, the stable owner, Henry F. Yearance, lost his stable, his two employees (Gertie and Jackson) and his six horses, one of which was a prized colt that he turned down a $1,000 (1873 USD) offer to buy. Yearance also suffered major damage to his Washington Place residence, almost losing his entire family to the flames due to having gone to sleep. Damage from the fire totalled from $60,000–$90,000.

In 1878, the Erie Railroad built a new station depot once again at Passaic. This new station depot, now located at Main Avenue and Lexington Avenue, involved a much larger structure. The wooden station depot had a waiting room of 27 by 72 feet (8.2 m × 21.9 m) with ticket office and bay window of 9 by 15 feet (2.7 m × 4.6 m) facing the westbound tracks. To the west of the waiting room was the restrooms for both men and women. After that was the baggage room of 48 by 27 feet (14.6 m × 8.2 m) on the east side of the room and 27 by 21 feet (8.2 m × 6.4 m) on the west side. At the west end of the westbound depot was a 38-by-27-foot (11.6 m × 8.2 m) express room. The structure was enveloped by a long overhang that reached out to Lexington Avenue. On the east side of the tracks was a 235-foot (72 m) long open station shelter with a 20-foot (6.1 m) waiting room on the east end of the platform. The depot was moved onto the land owned by Edo Kip, resulting in Kip's land becoming valuable and himself wealthy. The station depot at Washington Place was moved to this location on November 10, 1879.

=== New stations and new trolleys (1868–1903) ===
On June 21, 1880, rail service began once again at the site of the original Acquackanonck station (Prospect Street and Main Avenue). This time known as Passaic Centre station, two trains a day served the new stop at Prospect Street. While serving as an extra station in Passaic, the hope was that the Passaic Centre station would end up serving as the new main station in the city. This station was also preceded by the addition of a station at Harrison Street c. 1875.

Attempts began in the late 1860s to build street-based railways in the city of Passaic. Two failed proposals included one in 1869 that was to go to Paterson and one in 1870 to Lodi. While the New Jersey State Legislature approved the incorporations of these horse-drawn railways, neither were built.

In 1887, the Passaic, Clifton and Garfield Electric Railway Company was established to run a new electricity-based trolley service through the eponymous cities. This new railway was completed in the city of Passaic in 1888, marking the first electric trolley line built in the state of New Jersey. The railway began operation of electric street cars in Passaic on July 26, 1890. (Bergen County prevented service from crossing the river into Garfield and the rails had not been built yet into Clifton.) Service began at Harrison Street and ended at the Wall Street Bridge over the Passaic, where it would reach the city of Garfield if approved, costing five cents. This service would run up Passaic Street to Main Avenue, where it would run to the city line and Harrison Street, servicing the Erie depot. After getting consent from Judge Seba Bogert to allow the electric railway to build through Clifton, they bought rights-of-way for the old horse-drawn service through Paterson.

In 1894, the city approved an ordinance that allowed the Passaic, Rutherford and Carlstadt Electric Railway to build tracks through Passaic. This new railroad would also reach the Harrison Street terminals used by the aforementioned railways. This railroad, which passed the main Erie station on the north side of the tracks, came off Madison Street at the Lexington Avenue junction, providing service to Paterson, Rutherford and Carlstadt. This railway would become known as the "White Line" due to their white railcars compared to the red ones of the Passaic, Clifton and Garfield Electric Railway. The company would rebrand itself as the White Line Traction Company in 1898 as a result. The system would be sold to a conglomeration firm known as the North Jersey Traction Company in 1899.

That same year, the city approved another electric railway, this time the Passaic and Newark Electric Railway. This new one would run past Passaic Bridge and Prospect Street stations before reaching the Erie main station via Main Avenue. After struggling to get through Nutley and Belleville due to construction, the railroad was finished, but would also soon end up under the control of the North Jersey Traction Company.

=== Early grade crossing elimination proposals (1906–1913) ===
==== Low and Spencer campaigns (1906–1910) ====
On December 17, 1906, Joseph Spitz, a Councilman for the Fourth Ward of Passaic, introduced two resolutions at a meeting because of problems with the grade crossings of the Erie in the city. The first resolution gave the Erie 30 days to put and maintain gates at the grade crossings in the city, stating that he felt Harrison Street needed the gates the worst from personal experience. He felt that the courts would ensure the city would have the upper hand on the gates. The second resolution involved the Monroe Street crossing, where the railroad had been elevated enough that a city fire truck had a near-crash in 1906 because of the condition of the crossing. Spitz's resolution requested the Erie make the Monroe Street crossing similar to the rest in the city.

Early in 1907, the Erie Railroad caught wind that the city wanted to open up Main Avenue by depressing the railroad's tracks. In March, reports surfaced that the railroad would look to hold up the process by using the court system. In doing so, the city would likely be forced to pay for a greater cost of track depression from Gregory Avenue to the Clifton city line. The railroad admitted that the project would save them money for hiring flagmen and accident lawsuits, the railroad felt that legal action would prevent the opening of the Highland Avenue and Madison Street crossings and delay the depression process.

That year, candidate for Mayor Fredrick Rollins Low, also an engineer, proposed a track depression with a train station over the railroad. Trolleys would be running through the city on the Erie right-of-way, but above the tracks. This proposal would also result in a tunnel under Prospect Street from Passaic Park station at the river. This new tunnel would go under Passaic City Hall and eliminate sharp curves in the city. It would also provide a ventilation system for the railroad, similar to a system made from Chelsea to Salem, Massachusetts. The project would cost about $5 million (1907 USD).

The track elimination project became part of the mayoral campaign of 1907. Brigadier General Bird Wilson Spencer announced on August 16 that he would oppose Frederick Low for Mayor at the primary election on September 10. Spencer, a previous mayor on three different occasions and a member of the City Council for 14 years, noted that the track depression would be a major part of his election platform. Low would end up defeating in the primary. The issue would be considered a bipartisan one, as Spencer, a Republican, and the Democratic candidate, John J. O'Leary, also wanted the tracks depressed in the city. However, skepticism remained in October 1907 that the railroad would want to depress the tracks through the city and prefer keeping the status quo of flagmen. Law would end up being elected Mayor on November 5, defeating O'Leary.

On October 22, 1907, Joseph Helmich was killed at the crossing on Harrison Street by a train. The engineer, Joseph Ronk, stated that he did not see Helmich and his mules until he was within 150 feet (46 m) of the Harrison Street crossing. A coroner's jury noted on November 12 that the Erie lacking gates to protect the crossing was the main reason for the fatality. The jury felt that the Erie having been asked on two occasions by Passaic to gate the crossing and having failed to do so made them responsible.

On December 2, James Maybury Jr., an inspector for the State Railroad Commission, sent a report to the Board of Commissioners explaining the situation at Harrison Street. Maybury noted that there were no gates or bells and a flagman only served the crossing until 7 p.m. Maybury also added that westbound trains cannot be seen from the Harrison crossing until trains are 30 feet (9.1 m) or less away. He added that if the Summer Street crossing, a gated crossing, was protected, that the Harrison Street one should be as well as Harrison dwarfed Summer in traffic. As a result of Maybury's report, the board decided to make a resolution to have the Harrison crossing protected.

A hearing was held on May 25, 1908, about the opening of the Madison Street crossing that the Erie had been opposing. A.D. Sullivan, the City Attorney met with the Commissioner of the Supreme Court at Sullivan's office. The courts had decided to open the crossing in favor of the city, but the railroad appealed, a hearing of which would be held in June 1908, resulting in the need for testimony. On June 15, the Council gave the railroad permission to change the location of the eastbound platform's shelter, though questions were asked if whether or not it would affect the opening of the Madison Street crossing. The Court of Errors decided on June 23 to postpone the hearing to July 2 so more information could be gleaned from testimony.

At the July 2 hearing, Harry Meyers, a property owner with significant amounts of land, felt that the approaches to the Monroe Street crossing were dangerous with the heavy traffic usage. By opening Madison Street, the danger to the citizens and traffic would be reduced. Meyers also felt that the Madison crossing being opened would eliminate stagnated development in the area. With the crossing open, Meyers stated that it was likely development around the station would increase and that leaving the Madison crossing close would be a problem. The City Surveyor backed up Meyers by stating that with the forecasted increase in development and population, opening up Madison Street would be necessary. The Surveyor noted that the Madison Street crossing would also be a safer one given the angles made trains visible from long distances.

The Erie Railroad's defense to keeping the Madison Street crossing closed was that the crossing was right at the northern end of the Passaic passenger station and having that crossing open would interfere with train service. Erie also felt that the crossing should not be opened because they felt that grade crossings should be abolished. They also claimed to have no money to provide an alternative to opening the crossing. The railroad also contended that the original petition did not have a proper number of signatures, stating that there was too many. The original petition was only to involve Madison Street property owners, but that some signers were not Madison Street property owners. By January 1909, a decision had yet to be made. On February 23, Sullivan appeared in Trenton to argue the Madison Street crossing case with the New Jersey State Supreme Court. Sullivan told the press that the belief was the Supreme Court would be the last fight in this case.

The full campaign for the Harrison crossing didn't begin until February 1909 when Maybury told people in Trenton that they needed to get the crossing flagged. Maybury managed to get them to insert bells with the flagman in their working shanty, but the inspector felt that the crossing needed gates anyway due to the poor angles and the heavy usage. At the February 11 hearing, the railroad and the State Railroad Commission agreed that the Harrison Street crossing needed a gate. In July 1909, construction began on gates at the Harrison Street crossing, which would get a set operated by lever, requiring the replacement of the flagman shanty, since the mechanism for doing so required a bigger building. The gates were installed on August 7.

Rumors broke out in June 1909 that the railroad was going to depress the tracks through Passaic as part of a plan to eliminate all grade crossings from Jersey City to Suffern, New York. People connected to the Erie stated that this would be involved in the electrification and four-tracking of the service. This plan would have the track depression beginning at Passaic Park station, run through the entire city, then return to grade at Clifton. On July 23, 1909, the same day the Harrison Street crossing construction began, an informal conference was held for members of the Passaic Street Committee, a part of the city council. Edward Kevitt, the chairman, noted that they had agreed that they would talk to the railroad about depressing the railroad tracks through the city. Kevitt stated that they felt that the dangerous crossings throughout the city would need to be depressed. However, Kevitt said they would not approach the City Council soon.

The decision came in November 1909, the Supreme Court set aside the ordinance passed by the city to force the opening of the Madison Street crossing. The Court felt that the signature debacle was the main reason for the main reason for the ordinance being put aside. Spitz, however, told the Passaic Daily News that he would introduce a new ordinance at the meeting on November 15. Sullivan stated at the November 15 meeting that he felt the city should appeal the decision of the Supreme Court. On November 20, Sullivan telephoned his colleague Michael Dunn, who also agreed that they should appeal the decision, stating it was based on the signature snafu rather than anything to do with the crossing safety. On December 7, 1909, Councilman Garret Roosma proposed a resolution to allow Sullivan to appeal the decision, so they could make progress on opening the Highland Avenue crossing.

A hearing was held at Passaic City Hall on May 20, 1910, of the State Railroad Commission. This hearing was to deal with the Highland and Madison crossings in Passaic and the Van Winkle Avenue crossing in Garfield. The Highland and Madison case was adjourned for a focus on the Van Winkle crossing.

The next hearing occurred on May 27, where Harry Meyers testified that the Madison Street crossing would not interfere with railroad operations, though it was noted that the crossing would connect Madison Street to the other section on his property. The Commissioners announced that the Highland Avenue crossing would not be opened because they were concerned about the sharp curve nearby. Joseph Spitz also testified stating that it would be the only way take care of congestion at the Jefferson Street and Monroe Street crossings. Spitz stated that the city could not allow the opening of streets that would end at the freight yard owned by the Erie, so Madison Street was the only option. His testimony asked the lawyers defending the railroad to challenge his expertise. Spitz denied that he was an expert in engineering, but noted that the Monroe Street crossing was the site of several accidents, including fatal ones. The Postmaster, Dennis Mahony, stated that since moving to Passaic in 1881, the development in Passaic, particularly on the Meyers tract, resulted in higher traffic and that the Madison Street crossing had to be opened to relieve growing traffic levels.

George Palmer, a representative of the railroad's real estate group, stated that the crossing would go through Erie property. William Hornbeck, the station agent, testifying in the railroad's defense, explained the design of the station and its platforms. Hornbeck stated that the switches and the platforms for the Railway Express Agency would be interfered with by the crossing and stated that the crossing would be blocked regularly by the trains for suburban traffic. Hornbeck stated that the milk companies who use the station would not have a place for their empty cans and lacked storage. The agent added that the underground subway would be sufficient for the public. Sullivan was unable to get Hornbeck to admit that would be a benefit for the city. John Tafferney, the railroad engineer, testified that the railroad would have to build a new place for milk cans if the old location was eliminated for the crossing. After Tafferney's testimony, the railroad asked for a dismissal, but was refused by the commission, who adjourned the hearing for a meeting in Trenton on May 30.

The hearing occurred on June 15 instead in Trenton, where the Van Winkle Avenue crossing was also denied. The decision came on June 24, denying the Madison Avenue petition by the city of Passaic.

==== Pierce Bill (1912) ====
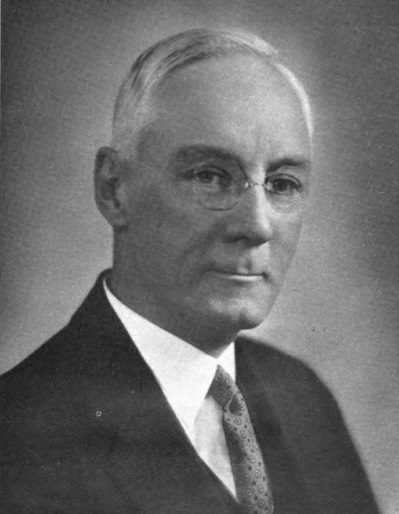
George Seger, the Mayor of Passaic in 1912

The City Commissioners met with the Men's Society of Passaic's Baptist Church on January 25, 1912. The new mayor, George N. Seger, along with a few Commissioners, talked about the need to eliminate grade crossings in the city, stating that it should be done at the expense of the railroad companies. This declaration was met with applause by those in attendance.

Seger reiterated his support of the track elimination at a meeting of the Passaic Board of Trade on February 1, stating the existence of a bill proposed by Senator Carlton Pierce to eliminate grade crossings. Seger's opinion was that the bill would result in most of the cost being shifted onto the municipality rather than the railroad. Because of the shift to the municipality, Seger suggested that the Board of Trade help send people to Trenton to lobby to adjust this. W.J. Bryant, a member of the Passaic Civic Betterment League, stated that Massachusetts and Illinois had better laws that New Jersey should emulate. Mason Strong, another member of the Board of Trade, noted that he had experience with the elimination of railroad crossings in Buffalo, New York, where the city took the maintenance costs and that the costs for elimination totaled about 60% for things related to construction, rather than construction itself.

Seger met in the State Senate Chamber with representatives by the Erie, Delaware, Lackawanna and Western Railroad and Pennsylvania Railroad and State Senators on February 7. At that meeting, the railroad stated that the clause attached to the Pierce bill asking the railroads to get rid of a designated number of grade crossings per year would put them out of business. Seger responded by asking how the railroads could be in poverty when one just finished a $12 million cut-off to shorten its route only 9 miles (14 km). Seger stated that he was disappointed with the comments by the Mayor of Paterson, Andrew F. McBride, stating the city was open to sharing the costs. Seger reiterated that the railroads should be the only organizations paying for the grade crossing elimination and that McBride's statements were made out of desperation. The railroad representatives were stunned by Seger's argument, figuring it would not be mentioned at all.

The Senate spent the morning of February 26 debating the Pierce bill. Senator William Thackara Read of Camden stated he felt the railroads should not be forced to take the majority of costs for eliminating grade crossings and offered an amendment of his own in response, which was met with support by the Republicans in the Senate. Pierce stated that the bill allowed the elimination of 84 crossings through the state and that doing so would only cost under $50 million, compared to the railroads, who were claiming an expense of $250 million. Senator George Sebastian Silzer decried the comments of Pierce that the bill met the requirements wanted by both parties. Silzer agreed with Seger that the railroads should be required to spend all the money involved, rather than the 85% funding.

The Senate passed the Pierce Bill on February 27 by a vote of 15 supports to 2 opposed. With the passed bill, the railroad would be required to eliminate six crossings considered dangerous per calendar year.

A protest occurred at the State House in Trenton on March 13 by various manufacturers, stating this new bill would result in the loss of their sidings. Manufacturers from the Jersey Shore stated that the depression of the tracks would also decrease their property values. At this meeting, the Mayors of East Orange, Elizabeth, Asbury Park, Phillipsburg, Orange, Morristown, Paterson, Trenton and the Mayor of Passaic, Seger. All but one of the municipalities represented showed support for the Pierce Bill. The representative from Orange, a railroad engineer himself, stated that the conditions would decline.

On March 26, almost a month after the Senate passed the Pierce Bill, the Assembly came up with a substitute bill. This version would be a lot more stringent than the Pierce Bill in terms of provisions and costs of the projects. This version, passed on March 29, stated that the railroad would have to eliminate one crossing for every 30 miles (48 km) of operating tracks in New Jersey and would have to be done at a 100% cost by the railroad unless the municipalities apply for the project, resulting in the railroad only taking on 85% of the project.

Governor Woodrow Wilson vetoed the grade crossing bill on April 8. However, it would not be until April 10 that the Legislature would find out why. On April 10, Seger went to Trenton again to go advocate for the Legislature to overturn the veto. At that time period, Seger advocated for depression of the tracks through Passaic rather than elevation.

Two days later, the Legislature held a session to deal with Wilson's vetoes on the grade crossing bill, along with others. The Governor contended that the bill was not law because of the five-day limit on signing it did not expire before the veto. He also backed away from a suggestion that the vetoes had been sent to the wrong house. Due to limitations in the State Constitution, they could not overrule officially on April 12, but would be able to on April 16. However, on April 16, the Senate did not overturn the veto of the Governor. However, the Assembly sent the law to the Secretary of State stating because of the failure to act within five days. With Wilson out of state until April 22, the Assembly felt that they could get the State to certify the law by April 20.

After being asked on April 30 by Governor Wilson, Attorney General Edmund Wilson announced on May 10 that a hearing would occur on June 4 in the Supreme Court on whether or not Pierce's bill was law or not.

Carlton Pierce came to Trenton to attend and testify at a hearing on May 20 at the request of Edmund Wilson. Also at this hearing was Frank Tansue, the chief clark for the Secretary of State and Francis Davis, the secretary of the Senate. Transue stated that a resolution the Assembly made for forwarding it to the Secretary of State reached the department before the bill did. Transue stated that it was treated as law because it was assigned chapter 412 and certified versions existed. Wilson also asked the workers in the Legislature who make the journal and the hearing minutes. Davis stated the rules by which they passed they legislation and votes on it. Pierce also filed in the court to have the petition by Edmund Wilson dismissed.

A second hearing occurred on May 27, where Pierce testified in his defense about the lack of effort by Governor Wilson. Warren Johnson, a stenographer for Governor Wilson, stated that the veto message was dictated to Johnson on April 2 and signed by the governor the day after.

However, on June 4, the Supreme Court decided that with several justices missing, that they would be better off postponing the hearing. This came after Wilson cited a law from 1873 that at least four justices (three associate and the chief justice) would be required to have the hearing. They did so, moving it until June 13.

The hearing did occur on June 13. At this hearing, Pierce appeared as the defendant in the case. Wilson's opening argument involved the 1873 law and whether or not the bypassing of the Governor was legal in the State Constitution. Pierce argued that the Secretary of State had already certified the rule, citing Pangburg v. Young allowed their actions. Pierce also stated that there was nothing that would allow the Governor to wait until the next Legislative session to give his veto over the five day rule.

On September 27, the Supreme Court overturned the law. The majority opinion stated that the Governor was not required to do the veto within five days. As a result, it meant that any bill sent to the Governor's office without any actions is dead rather than be open to the bypass Pierce used.

In a prepared interview from Cranford on October 1, Pierce announced that he intended to go ask for a new hearing at the Supreme Court. Pierce stated that the decisions made were mistake and that he wanted to present more opinions for the Court to consider. The Senator felt that the decision went against laws in other states and that he had concerns about the fact that any bill can just be abandoned by not being dealt with by the executive.

However, on November 8, the application for re-opening the case was denied by Chief Justice William Stryker Gummere, stating that Pierce's petition lacked any new evidence that had not been considered in the previous hearings.

==== Fielder Bill (1913) ====
Senate President James F. Fielder brought a bill to the Senate on January 14, 1913, to try again on the subject of grade crossings. Fielder's bill stated that the Public Utility Commissioners would have to make the decision on ordering railroads to eliminate the crossings. Railroads would still have to pay the majority of the bill, except when the crossings involve trolleys. The trolley company would also share the bill up to 10 percent. The municipality would be only required to pay for work involving utilities. In response to the veto by Governor Wilson of the Pierce Bill, the Fielder proposal would make the decisions based on home rule rather than overburden the railroad.

Fielder made an amendment to the bill later in the month to denote that the rules would also apply if the road was the crossing being changed rather than the railroad. Pierce decided to also introduce his own bill for grade crossing elimination. Pierce stated that with this bill, crossings would be gone in the state between 1933 and 1960 and that the 20 percent determined to be dangerous would be gone between 1917 and 1921. Despite protests by the railroads in early February demanding the costs be divided rather than hoisted on the railroad, the Fielder Bill passed the Senate on February 26, while the Pierce Bill was eliminated. The Assembly passed the Fielder Bill on March 11. However, with Wilson now President of the United States, Fielder signed the bill himself on March 13 as Acting Governor, despite a protest by Samuel Rea, the President of the Pennsylvania Railroad, to Fielder himself. Rea used Wilson's comments approving the elimination of grade crossings, but not at the heavy cost on the railroad. Rea asked that an impartial group exist to mediate between the railroad company and the municipality.

Under Chapter 57 of 1913 laws of New Jersey, municipalities would be required to petition for, produce and present a report explaining why they need grades eliminated. In this report, the municipality would be required to denote which crossings are of urgent matter and why; what kind of protection they requested for these crossings; explain any obstructions, pedestrian, vehicle and train traffic at crossings; the speed of trains at the crossing and distance from other crossings; stating the name of railroads and street railways that use the crossings; the existence of various utility and telegraph/telephone lines at the crossings. The Commissioners said priority would be given to those willing to do this full report and petition.

Passaic wasted no time applying for the petition to get help with grade crossing elimination. They managed to get their official petition to Trenton within hours ahead of Paterson, who also did the same thing. As a result, Passaic won the right to have their petition heard first. Their petition was focused entirely on the Erie Railroad's crossings only.

In April, the city released the report to the public and submitted it to the Commissioners. Their determination was that the Jefferson Street crossing, at the east end of the Main Avenue depot, was the busiest in the city. On April 5, 10,089 pedestrians used the crossing. Two days later, on April 7, 1,453, vehicles were tallied to use the crossing. At Monroe Street nearby, 4,749 pedestrians used the crossing, with 1,432 vehicles; at Harrison Street, 1,955 pedestrians and 457 vehicles; at Passaic Street, 5,594 pedestrians used the crossing, 1,182 vehicles and 152 trolleys; and at Washington Place it was 7,797 and 850.

=== First major campaign (1923–1926) ===
==== Fraternal interest in crossing elimination (January–March 1923) ====
Locations of the 13 grade crossings in Passaic

A string of freak accidents in late January and early February 1923 began to turn up the heat once again on getting work done about the Erie Railroad's grade crossings in Passaic. On January 30, a fatal crashed occurred at the Harrison Street grade crossing. On February 1, a westbound express train delayed over three hours came at high speed through Passaic around 6:30 pm. Irving Evansky, a traffic officer stationed to the crossing at Prospect Street and Main Avenue, saw the express coming and his colleague Edward Delaney told pedestrians to stand away as the gates were coming down. Dr. Joseph Kenna, a local dentist, was halfway between the tracks at the Jefferson Street crossing when the express was rushing through Passaic. Evansky rushed from his station to push the dentist out of the way of the oncoming train, sparing his life. On February 3, a dirt car for Public Service was at the Passaic Street grade crossing when it stalled on the tracks. The crew of five men on board were able after a half-minute to get the stationary trolley moving once again.

J.M. Condon, the superintendent of the railroad, informed Abram Preiskel, the Director of Public Safety, that he would come to Passaic on February 5 to discuss the problems with the crossings. Condon also noted that the incident on February 3 spurred an investigation and that the city should make sure trolleys get of the crossing rights-of-way, including at night, from the local enforcement officers. Condon also noted that he thought the trolley stopped because of a vehicle cutting it off on the other side. However, Passaic police could not understand how. Preiskel advocated for Condon to install "drop gates" that prevent people from crossing once the gates go down, a proposal brought up after Lodi bleachery owner Timothy Hagerty was killed at the Summer Street crossing on January 14, 1922. Preiskel also noted that he felt all the crossings from Summer Street to Prospect Street were dangerous and that the city would help the best they could, but he wanted a meeting with the superintendent and finally got one.

In Passaic, local fraternal organizations were starting to put pressure on getting the grade crossings in Passaic eliminated. The Lions Club of Passaic introduced informal discussion about it on February 1 at a meeting and dinner hosted by Dr. Morris Joseph. Joseph felt that it was time the city get to work on pressuring the railroad to get the grade crossings dealt with. The members agreed with him, feeling the city had failed to put sufficient pressure on the Erie and were lacking behind other cities. Nicholas Beery proposed that they form a committee of five to began the process. They also felt that it was important to get other fraternal organizations involved in their efforts.

On February 8, the local lodge of the Elks Club held their Past Exalted Rulers' Night with 168 guests. Besides a banquet honoring current and former members of the club, they also adopted a resolution backing the city government for the eliminating of grade crossings.

That same night, a low-attendance meeting of the Passaic Chamber of Commerce met. Judge George H. Dalrymple, the chair of the Erie Railroad Track Elimination Committee presented their report to the Chamber. Dalrymple noted that it was the biggest priority in the city of Passaic and that all organizations should be involved in the process. Noting the toughness of the process, Dalrymple noted that the forced action in Paterson should be used as precedent to get things done. The Erie fought the city of Paterson to the Supreme Court of the United States and lost to prevent having to elevate the tracks. The report noted that the Erie's only reason for not doing this is a financial lack of incentive. However, Dalrymple also noted that the Public Utility Commission finds it cheaper to elevate tracks rather than depress them.

Merchants on Main Avenue noted protest that the elevation of the tracks would destroy the look of the street. In this case, the Judge noted that a deal should be worked out with the property owners on Main Avenue to have the tracks depressed from Harrison Street to the station at Passaic Park. One proposal was to talk to the Erie about depressing the tracks if the Main Avenue property owners would fund 25 percent of the funds needed for this project. However, Dalrymple noted that when pressured, the railroad would focus on the cheapest option (elevation) over the more logical alternative to locals (depression) because of pure financial interest. In closing of his report, Dalrymple requested a committee be set up to work with the Passaic City Counsel and the Public Utility Commission.

In early March, the next fraternal organization to step up and discuss the grade crossing elimination was the local Rotary International. At a meeting on March 6, the Rotary had invited Judge Dalrymple to speak about the process, but could not due to an engagement in Trenton. Campbell noted at that point that the City Plan Commission wanted to widen East Main Avenue from Pennington Avenue to Washington Place with the roadway being bridged over the depressed tracks (if the latter were to occur). One week later, on March 13, Dalrymple did address the Rotary International at their next luncheon. Joined by Passaic City Engineer Colin Wise, Dalrymple explained the process of how the Erie and city viewed this situation, using history to point information out.

When the Paterson and Hudson River Railroad was built, there were only two main crossings through the city of Passaic, one at Prospect Street when Huyler's station was there and one nearby. In 1923, this number had ballooned to 13. Dalrymple and Wise explained to the organization that since 1917, 20 people had been killed at the crossings, with six in the prior 14 months. The 1922 statistics used to explain the information noted that 55,000 pedestrians and 34,600 vehicles (not including trolleys) crossed the grade crossing in a 12-hour span of day. Dalrymple also explained that track elevation would mean property values along Main Avenue would lose 50 percent while depression would gain 50 percent. Statistics showed that property values in the stretch of Main Avenue between Prospect Street and the downtown station were the highest per front foot in the city of Passaic.

Wise explained that a tunnel would be built from Harrison Street down through City Hall Park. This line would curve north of Passaic Park station, where the line would be elevated to meet Passaic Park and the drawbridge over the Passaic River. Dalrymple noted the expensive costs of the project, with the depression costing about $3 million and the elevation costing about $2.5 million. As he explained to the Chamber of Commerce in early February, that the Erie could be held accountable for getting stuff done, using the city of Paterson as his reasoning.

On March 21, the Passaic Chamber of Commerce met once again. At that meeting, the Chamber agreed to creating a subcommittee that would report to Mayor John H. McGuire and his fellow Commissioners to explain what the Chamber felt was best. The Chamber subcommittee would also request McGuire form a joint committee of them, the Commissioners and Main Avenue business owners that would be affected in the process. This joint committee would work in designing the plans and presenting their views to the Public Utility Commissioners when a hearing, likely in May, would be held. John Campbell noted that 5,000 feet (1,500 m) of property along Main Avenue would be affected averaging the value at $2,000 a foot, resulting in a figure of $10 million affected by the change. Elevation of the tracks would mean depreciation of $5 million. Campbell, who had a business on Oak Street that had a siding off the railroad, would take the gamble of supporting it, though he would likely have to sell his property if the tracks were lowered.

On March 23, City Counsel Albert Miller, Jr. noted that the city was ready to present its case to the Commissioners. Miller noted that the city would have to prove that the conditions of the tracks through Passaic are a danger to citizens, but also that the grade crossings are a major inconvenience to the municipality. Colin Wise prepared a bunch of maps and drawings for the city to use at the hearing. Wise would be the main witness presenting for the city. Miller noted that the idea would be some time in May for the hearing, but there was no guarantee yet on a date.

==== Action (April 1923) ====
On April 5, the meeting between the Chamber of Commerce and the Commissioners occurred at Passaic City Hall. The Chamber of Commerce was represented by Dalrymple, Campbell, Arthur Corbin and Secretary Thomas Brown. The Chamber of Commerce explained their views and that they would offer assistance to McGuire and the Commissioners for making the case as viable as possible. McGuire noted that he was in agreement with their views and that the City Counsel authorized Miller to provide whatever support from a legal perspective they needed. McGuire also agreed that depression of the tracks would be better than elevating them. Corbin noted that numerous citizens of Passaic would present themselves at the hearing to show their interest and said to focus on the deaths of Hagerty and Simon Roosma, both killed at crossings.

McGuire asked the subcommittee to name a list of residents who would be interest in the track depression project and that he would choose members for a new committee from that list. As the Chamber of Commerce wanted in their late March meeting, the committee would include numerous Main Avenue business owners who would be affected by the project. Dalrymple also recommended that an attorney with statewide experience be brought in on the project for the meeting on April 26 to help their cause.

In April, the Passaic Daily News got word the Erie Railroad wanted to relocate its downtown Passaic station again. They reported that the Erie was discussing with the owners of the former Passaic–Bergen Lumber Company on Main Avenue near the intersection with Chestnut Street. This would be for eliminating the Harrison Street stop and getting rid of the dangerous western platform at the Main Avenue station. The Erie wanted to eliminate the Jersey City-bound platform due to its noarrow design and concern that people were still at risk to be killed due to its design. The newspaper believed that the railroad did not want to rebuild on the Main Avenue site because of the Hygeria Brewing Company and Muhs & Amour packing plants that existed next to the railroad. The lumber company site, owned by Louis Levy, a local business owner and a local attorney, Harry H. Weinberger, did not state that they sold the property explicitly. However, Weinberger noted that discussions about a sale were active, declining to mention who had shown interest.

On April 23, the committee formed to prepare for the hearing on April 26 came to Passaic City Hall. At that meeting, it was decided that McGuire would appoint an executive committee that would sit in at all meetings and conferences for the track depression. 100 local citizens were invited to the meeting on April 23, about 30 appeared that night, including McGuire, Corbin, Preiskel, Darymple, and Campbell. At that meeting, McGuire explained that Miller and Wise were ready to present the details. Dalrymple noted that he spoke with Harry Meyers and Harry Stein, two local large property owners on Main Avenue. Meyers and Stein both felt that the business owners should help fund the project. McGuire noted that Wise would submit his plans to the Commissioners that day with all deaths and accidents at the crossings since 1904 to help back them up. However, McGuire wanted the city to have eyewitnesses to crashes and fatalities there to testify as well.

At the April 23 meeting also was Edward C. Brennan, the president of the Clifton Chamber of Commerce. Brennan spoke to the committee, noting the city of Clifton's views on grade crossings were equal to Passaic's and wanted to make sure that Clifton and Passaic were united, rather than working separately. In Clifton, they were fighting for a new station and freight facilities. Brennan said concern that the work getting done in Passaic would influence and ultimately hurt the work being done in Clifton if being done separately. McGuire responded that the city had no intent to do anything harmful to Clifton and would be open to agreeing on anything that would help both cities rather than be detrimental to each other.

Another issue raised at the meeting was the question of attendance. Miller noted that the hearing on April 26 would be a preliminary hearing, but Wise and Corbin both advocated many people attend the meeting as possible to show that the citizens are as interested as the city is in getting this done. Corbin noted also that would likely be necessary to appoint a bunch of subcommittees to handle the various issues involved in getting the track depression done, including railroad cooperation, finances, and working with Clifton on their interests. Preiskel also suggested that a delegation of citizens visit with Governor George Sebastian Silzer to discuss the project, but this was shot down, thinking it would not be wise to go over the Commissioners' heads. Mayor McGuire also appointed A.R. Barton, Adrian Zandee and George Aldous to arrange the necessary plans to get everyone to Newark for the hearings.

To aid the cause, members of the Passaic police were at various crossings in Passaic to get the numbers on how often cars and pedestrians were crossing the tracks. They also checked to find out how soon the gates go down when the trains were approaching. The gatemen, employed by the Erie, eventually figured out what they were doing and began to lower the gates at the very last minute a train would cross and raise them before the trains were clear. Times of that process ranged from 30 seconds to 3 minutes. Passaic Street saw 4,537 vehicles and 8,510 pedestrians cross; Jefferson Street had 6,334 and 13,704; Monroe Street had 4,100 and 13,372 and Washington Place had 2,813 and 8,438. Preiskel noted to a meeting of Third Ward politicians that as many people use these crossings at a number higher than the total number of residents of Passaic.

==== Meetings (April–June 1923) ====
On April 26, the meeting with the Public Utility Commissioners in Newark occurred. At the meeting, Miller and Wise led their case, explaining all the statistics brought by the Passaic Police Department, along with the records of crashes and fatalities at the 13 crossings since 1904. In accordance with the 1913 law, Wise also submitted all the sewer lines, conduits, utility lines and other pertinent information of the structure of the crossings. Miller called several witnesses, including McGuire, Dalrymple, Preiskel, Corbin and Wise, along with Richard Morrell (President of the Passaic Chamber of Commerce), Gustav Schmidt (the Chief of the Police Department), John Meade (one of the patrolmen), and Reginald Bowker (the city Fire Department Chief), to back up all the statistics and figures to show interest.

When the afternoon session of the meeting was to start, Brennan stood up in the audience and urged the Commissioners to consider the city of Clifton in its decision-making. Brennan echoed his prior interest in getting the new passenger station and freight facilities that the city wanted. Commissioner Joseph Autenrieth responded to Brennan by noting that the Commissioners would give consideration to Clifton's interest in their delegations.

During the afternoon session, Corbin noted in his testimony that he had seen numerous trolley cars stall out at the Passaic Street crossing ove the years. Corbin also noted a personal experience when his car was destroyed by a train at the Jefferson Street crossing c. 1903. He also noted that multiple people had been killed at the same crossing. Duane Minard, the Erie's General Counsel, countered that the traffic on Main Avenue could be adjusted with the change of parking regulations, but Corbin noted that was not likely. Morrell noted that he was a witness to those hampered by the continuous delays of trains crossings, but could not prove he was an eyewitness to any accidents at any of the 13 crossings.

Richard Bowker testified about the numerous occasions that his fire equipment escaped numerous crossings on the slimmest of margins. He also testified that the Harrison Street crossing was the worst for his department as the switches nearby were in constant use. Bowker also testified that he had seen numerous people run under the gates at the Jefferson Street crossing to catch their trains. Minard immediately objected, stating that the railroad is not legally at fault for those who choose to risk their own lives at the crossings. However, George Record objected to that stating that the conditions at the crossings constituted a "death trap", the community in general (including the city and the railroad) would be required to take care of them.

Minard did not oppose the introduction of the statistics into the case, but noted that he wanted a copy and would be offering his own numbers in response. Miller and Wise provided the 1913 records of pedestrian crossings, along with a similar study taken in 1922. The details about the gatemen from the April 21, 1923 study were also provided. Minard also stated that there were only two ways a railroad would be required by law to eliminate crossings. These included dangerous conditions because of various easements on the railroad right-of-way or that the railroad crossing is an impediment to traffic. The meeting was adjourned until May 9, 1923.

The May 9 meeting was a lot smaller than the April 27 meeting. The May 9 meeting involved record, Miller and Wise representing the city. That day, Wise noted that the tunnel plan would cost $4,239,625 while a different depression project would cost $2,833,792 and another at $2,253,186. Arthur S. Hughes and Louis Benatar testified that day on the costs and property valuations of the project. Hughes backed up Wise, noting that the elevation would now eliminate 70 percent of the property values, while the depression would make them go up 33 percent. Wise also re-presented his data on accidents and fatalities at crossings in 1904. Also brought up at this meeting was the idea of electrification, but the Erie opposed it because their system did not have one. Duane Minard asked for an adjournment and it was continued until June 14.

On May 13, Frederick Douglas Underwood, the President of the railroad, reached out General Bird Wilson Spencer, a prominent local banker, about having personal discussions about the track depression in Passaic. Underwood asked that he wanted to reach out to the people who were interested in moving the tracks and wanted to come to an agreement without major attorney use, costing the railroads fortunes. The Passaic Chamber of Commerce stated that instead they wanted to follow the process they were already involved in. After attending a bankers convention in Atlantic City, Spencer's meeting with the property owners along Main Avenue would occur on May 21. At the meeting, Spencer met with multiple property owners at the Passaic City Club, and created a committee of seven men who would meet with Underwood at a future date. They felt it was important to have a heart to heart with Underwood instead of the derogatory names going on in the public. Spencer and the property owners felt it was worth going back to a 1910 proposal by William Harahan that would involve depress the tracks between Aycrigg and the Passaic/Clifton line. This proposal would have had a $5 million bond added to the Paterson and Hudson River Railroad lease to fund the project. This project also included electrification and people from Ho-Ho-Kus to Jersey City offered up money. The current owners wanted electrification and stated the Erie likely had the proposals around, saying it could be 10–15 years before the line would be electrified.

The meeting with Underwood occurred on June 7, 1923. At the meeting, Spencer and his committee had lunch and discussed the various topics with the project. Underwood stated that he was sympathetic to the city of Passaic's views. Underwood felt that it was important to eliminate all 13 grade crossings in Passaic. They felt that there was a route where both sides would agree on track depression instead of elevation. Erie Railroad engineers were prepared to work with Colin Wise on making sure new plans were drawn up that the railroad and the city would appreciate. At that point they would work on the question of financing the project. Underwood stated that further conferences would be scheduled. That same week, Minard reached out to the Commissioners, led by John Roegner, to talk about appointments with Miller, the city attorney. Minard wanted to discuss making deals to clear having to use the Public Utility Commission.

==== Discussions and delays (June–November 1923) ====
On June 12, Miller went to the Passaic Board of Commissioners to tell them that the discussions with the Erie Railroad had made significant progress. As a result, Miller contacted the Public Utility Commissioners in Newark and got the hearings for June 14 delayed until further notice. While discussions were going on, property values in the city of Passaic started booming. The track depression, deepening of the Passaic River and elimination of the Bloomfield Avenue grade crossing for the Delaware, Lackawanna and Western Railroad tracks. The Passaic Chamber of Commerce noted that the influence of strong discussions between the city and the railroad were the largest influence. Speculation of the Chamber believed that property values would double with the construction of a track depression.

On July 5, it was announced that the Erie Railroad and the committees representing the city of Passaic would have a new meeting on July 9 at Passaic City Hall. It would mark the first time that the city officials and railroad executives would be meeting together on the topic. Representing the city of Passaic would be McGuire, Preiskel, Morrell, Spencer, Campbell, Dalrymple, Corbin, Stein, Miller, William Abbott, and Anton Patterson. Representing the railroad would be Underwood, Minard and R.C. Falconer, the chief engineer of the railroad. Miller noted that the Public Utility Commissioners hearings were postponed for these conversations. However, there was skepticism that the Erie would bring the idea of elevation instead of depression, the preference of the city. The city committee would be interested in offering that the city and property owners would be willing to help pay the difference between the two to help persuade the railroad.

Meanwhile, Edward Brennan and the Committee of Directors for the Clifton Chamber of Commerce he was part of reached out to those involved in a July 9 meeting between the Erie Railroad and McGuire's committee to talk about their interests. Having been promised consideration in any plans by McGuire and the Public Utility Commissions, they felt that Clifton was being left out on discussions between the two parties. Clifton felt like that all the requests they asked of the railroad (new freight facilities and a new passenger station) were reliant on what happened in Passaic.

On top of that, Clifton was proposing a different idea for the tracks through Passaic. Instead of elevating or depressing the tracks along Main Avenue, the city of Clifton recommended that the railroad elevate the tracks, but move it away from Main Avenue and use side streets instead. By doing this, the tracks would be elevated from Passaic Park to Paulison Avenue in Clifton. This new line would involve passing the new armory down to McLean Street to Passaic Street on private property to Elm Street. At Elm Street, the line would turn on Monroe Street at the Lexington Avenue crossing. The tracks would then cross Lexington Avenue until Quincy Street, where it would cross private property once again. After that, it would turn onto Central Avenue and reaching the main tracks at Harrison Street. This route would mean that the new train station downtown would be built away from Main Avenue. By doing so, Main Avenue would be completely free of the railroad tracks and allow property values along the street to skyrocket.

However, the tones at July 9 meeting were less positive than recent discussions. The Erie did not commit to any timeline for construction of a depression project. J.J. Mantell and George Orcutt, along with Falconer, noted that they focused on adoption of a plan (not the proposed depression plan, just a plan). They felt that the railroad also did not have the financial stability to go through with what the city wanted. However, they stated that they would work with the city and not produce any unneeded delays. Falconer stated that they would have a proposal finished by the end of 1923. McGuire dug in his heels asking when they could start on a depression project. However, the railroad would be open to plans for elevation and depression. The general belief by Passaic officials at the meeting is that the Erie Railroad would eat the entire cost of building the elevated tracks. However, Falconer denied this stating that the railroad could not do the Passaic and Paterson projects at the same time from a financial standpoint.

Miller offered that the railroad could use the Passaic depression work's dirt to build the fill used for elevating tracks through Paterson. Falconer blew down the idea, stating that the dirt was inexpensive and there would be no financial benefit to moving dirt from Passaic to Paterson for the purpose of building the fill. Mantell noted that railroad would have no idea on how to handle the service adjustments that would occur for the upcoming Paterson project, much less two projects simultaneously. They felt that having two projects at the same time would not allow them to offer service and was not going to happen.

George Record, the special attorney, noted that the city wanted to get close to a settlement before returning to the Public Utility Commissioners for more public debate. Record noted that it was up to the Erie to help make these progress and offer a day when in private discussion, the finances and timeline would be outlined for such a project. Record noted they would not budge from their position without some kind of offer. To that, Orcutt responded that the estimates can be given, but it would take time for they have no idea what projects they would be estimating for. Record responded that with the Commissioners case pending, the railroad could not give an indefinite timeline on getting those plans and numbers. Falconer did ask that McGuire appoint yet another committee to keep in touch with the engineers on this proposal by Record. This was approved by all parties. Miller noted that the next hearing with the Commissioners would be in September and that the date should be kept with action on 30 days' notice. The city is that the city engineers would keep in contact with the railroad about progress.

When it came to the suggestions offered by Clifton, they and a letter by Spencer about interest of property owners to help fund were read by McGuire at the meeting. Falconer responded that the railroad would show interest in working with the people of Passaic and would adopt a plan the city approved of. Falconer noted that with depression, the tracks would have to be detoured through the city of Passaic, using various city streets, reiterating that they could not do both the Passaic and Paterson projects simultaneously, adding on that they had tracks in six states to take care of.

In late July, parts of northern Passaic started stirring about the Erie Railroad's proposed relocation the downtown Erie station to near Main Avenue and Harrison Street as part of the depression project. This new station would be built on the Public Service yard located near the aforementioned intersection. It was believed that Public Service had recently turned over its 99-year lease to the Erie Railroad, who wanted to combine the Harrison Street and downtown Passaic stations, but this was denied by Public Service. This yard, meant for trolley car storage, was to be used along with the property of Harry Weinberger, a landowner next to the yard. Weinberger admitted that he had been in negotiations with the Erie about acquiring some of his property.

Duane Minard denied any knowledge of property being bought for the new station land, but the railroad stood to benefit that the new location. The new station would help railroad business and financial advantage of businesses in the area. Public Service had not used the yard on a primary basis in several years but kept for turning cars or using it as an emergency yard. A proposal to build a tank in the yard was denied because of complaints by locals. The Erie was believed to only be making these decisions of the depression project and the results would differ depending on the results of negotiations.

On September 20, 1923, with negotiations still going on, Miller was informed by A. N. Barber, the secretary of the Public Utility Commissioners that the September 11 meeting mentioned in July was postponed until October 11. The city agreed to the adjournment so that if negotiations fall apart, they would still have the hearing to work with. Miller noted that the October 11 meeting likely would be postponed as well due to the discussions between the two parties, including the railroad and city engineers working together on drafting a plan. The adjournment of the October 11 meeting did occur as planned, being delayed for yet another month. The subcommittee requested at the July 9 meeting, which was Pettersen, Preiskel, Dalrymple, Campbell, Morrell and William A. O'Brien, had yet to meet since formation. The Passaic Daily News said it was questionable if the Erie Railroad had done anything in terms of work in Passaic. However, there was interest in having a meet to get an update from the railroad.

Duane Minard informed Miller on November 19 that the Erie Railroad was ready to meet with drawn up plans. Minard said the committee appointed by McGuire should be ready with questions to ask the railroad about these plans. Miller noted that McGuire would likely call another meeting of that committee, which Dalrymple chaired, to come up with questions. Minard did not specify what the plans were, but the committee believed that the railroad was going to dig in its heels and stick with the cheaper elevation project, against the wishes of the city.

On November 20, a third fraternal organization joined those who wanted to get the grade crossings downtown eliminated. After talking to the Asbury Park lodge, the Kiwanis Club of Passaic their support behind it. They also supported the elimination of the grade crossing in Morgan, one of the most dangerous in the state. Weinberger, President of the local lodge in Passaic, felt that Passaic had to do the same, singling out the Harrison Street crossing. On November 27, the Kiwanis held a "Ladies' Night" run by Weinberger. A report made by the public affairs subcommittee produced a report about eliminating the grade crossings in Passaic. They noted that the Kiwanis should cooperate with fellow fraternal and civic organizations until the crossings were eliminated. A resolution was also adopted to support the elimination of the grade crossing in Morgan.

On November 20, the Passaic Chamber of Commerce held another meeting, and Dalrymple explained what happened at the previous meeting. Dalrymple also noted that the committee representing the city would meet when detailed information was ready.

On November 23, the committee announced that they were going to meet with the chief engineer of the railroad, R.C. Falconer, on November 30 after trying to meet on November 26. The committee had a meeting that morning to decide on formulating plans, but could not find anything they were required to do according to McGuire. Spencer also attended the meeting in the morning, noting his lack of anything to say but that they were united on depression while the Erie wanted elevation. Colin Wise had sent out plans for a tunnel approach (like Clifton suggested) and another for depression (the supported plan). McGuire asked Spencer what he felt, seeing the Brigadier General was important to the community. Spencer noted jokingly that the railroad would find a way to get anything they wanted done, even if it took 50 years. Spencer stated that he wanted to do anything he could, but noted the Erie was the one that would have to come to the table to help make an agreement.

This meeting did occur on November 30 as planned with Falconer. Both plans sent in by Wise and the railroad were discussed at length, but no decision was agreed to save that Clifton would have its tracks elevated or depressed in the same plans, no matter what. The parties adjourned, agreeing for another meeting.

==== Progress fizzles out (May 1924 – December 1926) ====
In early May 1924, the Erie Railroad provided the plans of their choice and estimations that the city of Passaic wanted. Minard gave the information to Miller officially. The Erie's estimates was that if the tracks were depressed it would cost just over $3.5 million (1924 USD). The Erie's preferred elevation plan would cost $2.4 million. The Erie still claimed poverty in 1924, noting they felt that Main Avenue property owners would be required to help budget the project. However, the city of Passaic felt that if that occurred, none would pay up given the damage to property values. The property owners would likely only stick with the depression project.

McGuire's committee noted that they would meet to review all the findings, but it was noted that this was the Erie's first step forward since 1913. Miller noted the lawsuit the city of Paterson used against the railroad meant the railroad would have to pay the cost for elevation. If the tracks were depressed through Paterson, the city would have to help pay for the cost. At the same time, the Erie was ready to meet with the committee and their engineers had begun to start testing rock strata at a majority of the 13 crossings in Passaic.

On May 19, 1924, Colin Wise, the city engineer who had developed the plans for the depression of tracks the Erie worked with, died at age 79 after a long fight with influenza.

No discussions on these figures occurred until December 1924, when there was a renewed interest on a new meeting with the railroad. On December 26 it was announced that a meeting would occur on December 30 with heavy involvement of Harold Harder, the new city engineer after Wise's death.

At the meeting, both sides continued to dig in their heels. McGuire and his committee noted that they wanted to stick with the depression and the railroad wanted to stick with the elevation. At this meeting, it was noted that most of the 13 crossings would have to be closed off for at least two years for construction of the depressed tracks, rather than elevation, which would keep them open. However, McGuire's committee seemed to believe that the railroad were exaggerating in their efforts to persuade the cityu to come to their side. George Aldous, then-President of the Chamber of Commerce, noted that it was "confessing incompetency if they that the crossings would have to be closed." Morell also noted that the alignment of the railroad through the city would have to change because of obstacles such as the Passaic City Armory and a new athletic field for the Board of Education.

The consistent issue of financing was brought up once again, as William Abbott noted that the Passaic should stand to help out with the cost of the depression. Aldous asked if the city was prepared for such a financial investment and McGuire stated that they were if it was believed to be in the city's best interest. At the end of the meeting McGuire formed another subcommittee to continue discussions with the railroad, led by McGuire himself. This subcommittee would likely be meeting with the railroad in early January 1925.

McGuire sent a letter to the Erie Railroad on January 3, 1925, noting that they wanted to talk early in the month as possible with the railroad on coming to a deal. Falconer responded to McGuire c. December 7 that he would have a meeting in a little over a week. However, McGuire's subcommittee would also inform the railroad that they were going to stick in their demands for depression.

However, this meeting did not occur until January 29. At that meeting, R.C. Falconer, Duane Minard and George Fanning did throw their support behind the depression project. Their agreement was reliant on Passaic forking up the money to help the railroad pay for the project. Minard stated that the railroad had no objection if the "usefulness of the railroad" was not burdened by the project. Spencer noted that he wanted to get more official numbers and find out if the difference was worth paying for. Spencer moved for the railroad's engineering department to submit tentative costs of both projects, along with the changes of stuff as sidings and sewage lines to the committee.

Falconer also explained the problem with the tunnel approach proposed by the city of Clifton. With the Erie Railroad using steam engines, the cost of ventilation would be excessive, noting a project in Jersey City where they got rid of a tunnel for open ventilation. He felt that if the railroad were electric, the tunnel approach would be more feasible. For the standard track depression, Falconer noted the construction would take much of the railroad right-of-way and prevent the installation of a third track, which they could do with an elevated project. Falconer felt it was "foolish" to not try to get a third track through Passaic. Falconer also agreed to Spencer's motion for new estimates and plans of both projects. He stated that the previous estimates were rough and the difference would be greater than $1.1 million.

In May 1925, Commissioner Anton L. Pettersen, who was also in control of the roads in Passaic, announced that the Erie Railroad had agreed in the meantime to improvements at all grade crossings in the city. The impetus was reconstruction of the Gregory Avenue crossing in 1924. Pettersen noted that the board planks that had been at every grade crossing to help automobiles cross the tracks would be replaced with asphalt. In this case, the city agreed that they would bear some of the cost for this job. At Monroe Street, the steep grade would cause cars to stall out crossing the junction, resulting in a possible accident if they do not clear the crossing. Park Place, Prospect Street and River Drive all had worse versions of the Monroe crossing. At Harrison Street and Summer Street, the wooden plank crossings were falling apart and shaking automobiles that would cross.

The Monroe Street crossing was taken care of in early August 1925. At Monroe, the new asphalt was applied and the crossing and the grade reduced. Public Service then worked on embedding their tracks for construction of new the asphalt crossings so that disturbance was minimal. Passaic Street's crossing would be the same design as Monroe Street.

In October 1925, another traffic study at the grade crossings in Passaic was done. This time, the Erie Railroad, led by L.S. Rose, an assistant divisional engineer and fifteen of his assistants, did the study. Stationed at the crossings, the Erie staff would observe traffic in 15 minute portions, creating charts to depict travel levels. The statistics would then go to help the Erie Railroad with new designs and plans for the grade elimination.

=== 1926 fire ===
At 2:01 a.m. on December 22, 1926, the passenger station at Passaic exploded and caught fire. A total of six painters were working on the station, removing varnish on the walls and had been for the previous two days. The varnish remover, highly flammable, filled the depot with an invisible gas that ignited when one of the painters knocked out an incandescent light. The filament in the light bulb met the gas and caused an explosion. Three of the four painters were seriously burned, one of which was critical. A construction inspector employed by the Erie Railroad, Harry Hummer of Allendale, also suffered injuries from the explosion. Hummer ran down the tracks with his clothing aflame. Two taxi drivers, Raymond Kasan and John Coco, was able to catch Hummer at the grade crossing on Monroe Street. There, they removed his flaming clothing and doused him in motor oil. Kasan and Coco rushed Hummer into a taxi and went to Passaic General Hospital.

Another taxicab driver, William Rogers, saw through the screen window that the night ticket agent, Ray Osborn, was trapped in the burning station. Osborn could not get through the door to the aflame waiting room. Rogers bashed the window open while James Tosh, the night clerk at the nearby taxi stand, jumped in and helped Osborn out through the window. Osborn suffered a cut from the building on his way out the window. After getting Osborn out, Tosh grabbed $600 (1926 USD) from the station and gave it to the police. Rogers, Tosh, along with the manager of the taxi stand, Edward Koplow, also worked on getting the three injured painters to the hospital. They found George Leginos, one of the painters, on the floor in the burning waiting room and was taken to the hospital by taxi.

The sound of the explosion was heard at the Passaic Fire Headquarters nearby, and when they arrived, they found all the windows and doors blown out and flames shooting out of all directions. Before the alarms were even rung to get engines moving to the station, several trucks had already left the premises to respond. They started by washing the flames at the baggage room to prevent further expansion when their Chief arrived on the scene. This was to ensure keeping the baggage room and nearby Railway Express Agency, attached to the depot, from catching fire with the rest of the building. These efforts were successful, as the Railway Express Agency only suffered an inch of soot from the flames and ashes of the flaming depot. The stationmaster, Lee C. Bailey, arrived in the morning with a contingent of Erie officials to save anything salvageable from the baggage room, Express Agency and the ticket office.

The flames were finally put out around 6:00 a.m. Trains coming from Pavonia Terminal would drop their passengers off at the Jefferson Street crossing, then move slowly through the wreckage site. For trains heading to Pavonia, the trains would pick up or discharge passengers at Monroe Street. However, no trains were affected by the explosion and service ran as normal during the four-hour period. Damage was totaled at around $15,000, $10,000 of which was the wooden station depot and $5,000 for the contents inside. All personal belongings to those inside were burned up, and those sent to the hospital were given new clothes. By that evening, the Erie began the process of converting the small waiting room on the westbound side of the tracks into a new temporary agency for the ticket staff to work with. By December 24, the condition of the severely burned Leginos began to improve.

=== Replacement fight (1926–1928) ===
==== Fighting for permit ====
With the damage to the depot including a collapsed roof and charred wooden beams, there was hope that the city of Passaic would finally get a better station than the one that burned. However, the Erie Railroad noted that there were no plans to replace the station outright. Residents of the city felt the wooden depot, built in 1878, was an eyesore and given the opportunity, a new station would improve the neighborhood. The Mayor of Passaic, John McGuire, noted that he would pressure the Erie Railroad to replace the building. McGuire, imagining a station similar to Ridgewood, wanted the Erie to produce the best station possible.

Frank Ackerman, the Passaic Buildings Supervisor, served the Erie Railroad with a notice that the depot would have to be demolished and replaced with a brand new structure, despite the Erie's wishes to just rebuild the charred building. Citing a city ordinance that any building declared a 50 percent or more loss after a fire would require replacement over rebuild, Ackerman noted that the railroad would not be given a permit to rebuild the station as it currently stood. However, the Erie remained steadfast in their interest to rebuild the depot in its current condition on Main Avenue. By December 29, Ackerman had sent the railroad a letter explaining his stance and the ordinance. Ackerman noted that while the two parties, both dug in their heels, sorted this out, the station depot would remain in its current condition. However, Ackerman also noted that he had the ability to have the station demolished on his request as a problem of blight and would do so if necessary.

Digging even further, the Erie Railroad decided by early January 1927 that they were going to try to get Ackerman's order removed by going to the Passaic City Commissioners. Ackerman, while never notified about the Erie's decision, did write a stern letter to the railroad noting the city's stance and the ordinance that he was making the decision. The appeal occurred on February 1, 1927. There, W.J. Rider, an official of the Erie railroad, requested permission to repair the depot. McGuire, representing the city and its Commissioners, noted that they would like better plans from the Erie on what they planned to do in this rebuild. McGuire also requested that Rider go to the Passaic Chamber of Commerce, who created a special committee for the purpose of discussing the new station.

On February 28, the Erie Railroad and Ackerman came to an agreement in the months long dispute over the renovation. Ackerman submitted a permit that would give the depot masonry walls over the previous wood ones, with tile and stucco on the outside of the building. There would be new windows, doors and floors, along with newsrooms and the replacement of the canopies. They agreed to a $9,500 deal, $5,000 of which would be provided by the Erie. Ackerman announced a couple days later that the new station would be brought into fire code complaint to modern laws, and this rebuild would involve everything but the foundation, meeting his earlier requests. Ackerman also told the press that the work would commence quickly.

==== Fighting with the city ====
However, by early June 1927, no construction on the rebuild had even started. The Erie announced that it was going to meet with Ackerman and the Commissioners because the permit that the latter had provided, came with an expiration date of June 25. The railroad did not specify what the exact issues were, but were ready to talk with the city. The meeting, held on June 16, was also to discuss the concept of depressing the railroad tracks through Passaic. The project, which would cost $2 million, completely collapsed at that meeting. The new mayor, John J. Roegner, threatened that the city would build a new station by itself, and charge the railroad for the costs if the railroad did not agree with their demands on eliminating the Main Avenue crossings.

The representative from the Erie Railroad, George Fanning, noted that depression through the city of Passaic would not be attempted or considered due to the depth of the cut required, causing stores and residents to be affected by smoke and gasses. Fanning noted that if the railroad were electrified, then they would consider the depression concept. Fanning also reiterated that the railroad had no intention of installing electrical systems at that point in time. His response that the best approach would be to elevate the tracks through Passaic and would cost about $4 million, to be considered after their work would be done in nearby Paterson on elevating tracks. Fanning did note that there would be near zero chance of that as well unless the city wanted to pony up at least half the funds for the track elevation. With residents concerned how the elevation would work, Fanning noted they could do similar to the nearby Delaware, Lackawanna and Western Railroad at Van Houten and Passaic Avenues and make artistic walls.

The June 16 meeting got heated when the discussion came to the still ruined depot on Main Avenue. Despite the permit being acquired from Ackerman, the city had yet to give the go-ahead to allow construction to begin. The railroad felt there were problems with allowing construction of a new masonry depot at Main Avenue, if plans existed to just build elevated tracks, because that building would have to be demolished for the elevation, requiring a new station be built again. Roegner, feeling that the railroad had been "kidding us for fifteen years" stood his ground, accusing the railroad of doing nothing and making the aforementioned threat to build the station himself, whether or not the railroad wanted to.

Standing in their heels once again, Mayor Roegner announced the creation of a 16-member committee to discuss all things pertaining to the Erie Railroad in Passaic in early July. This would include the grade elimination, the deteriorating passenger station and issues with the plaza itself.

Fanning wrote a letter to Roegner within a week noting that they wanted to get started on the new building and willing to start immediately on construction. With the old permit expired, the city did not want to give the railroad a new permit because of Ackerman's issues. The railroad also chose to stand its ground in that it would not build a new station, which Ackerman would prefer. The railroad still felt that the building was not a 50 percent loss as claimed and felt the rebuild would be sufficient. Fanning cited the insurance estimates, which came out to $4,024.48 in damage (a reduction from $4,208.60 originally estimated), meaning it would not reach 50 percent of the original $9,500 value of the depot. Fanning also argued that the ordinance Ackerman was using, noted that the railroad could use a clause that reconstruction would be allowed under 50 percent damage.

However, in a blow to Ackerman, the committee appointed by Roegner decided in favor of the railroad. Herman Schulting Jr., a member of the committee, noted that progress with the Erie Railroad had been made, but that no permit would be given until the Commissioners met once again to discuss the current proposals. Schulting asked Roegner if a committee's decision would set a precedent in terms of overruling the city ordinance. Roegner responded that exceptions would only be considered in the current situation. Ackerman felt that the city was allowing the railroad to ignore new building codes and disappointed that the committee felt it was fine to waive the regulations. Ackerman noted that the building ordinance would allow a proper building with masonry walls over a frame station and reiterated that the rules allow the city to force the railroad to do what they want. Ackerman also disputed the idea that the station was not a risk to more fire, noting that embers from the train would easily put others at risk once again. The committee also instructed the secretary to draw a resolution that would be presented by the Commissioners noting that the decision would not interfere with possible future elimination of the grade crossings. Schulting noted that the entire decision for the Commissioners is based on deciding between the final insurance amounts or Ackerman's estimates. Roegner noted that the Commissioners would give it thought and be ready to make a decision on July 26.

At the meeting of the Commissioners on July 27, with Ackerman in attendance, the decision was made set aside the report of the committee. The Commissioners agreed to investigate further and hold yet another conference later. Ackerman's protest felt that the city would be providing a permit in complete contrast to current zoning laws. Roegner agreed with Ackerman that they should force the Erie Railroad to give Passaic a new station instead of rebuilding the old one.

==== Strong-armed into new station ====
At that meeting however, the decision was made to move this into the hand of Dr. Joseph J. Weinberger, the city attorney. By doing so, the city of Passaic ordered that the old station be demolished within five days. Ackerman signed the letter that served notice that it would be open to getting prosecuted. Weinberger told the railroad that if they did not comply, he would file charges with the police about violating the building ordinance. He also threatened that he would continue to do this until the nuisance was taken care of. Weinberger noted that if that did not work that he would appear before a prosecutor and have the railroad indicted. Finally, Weinberger also noted that they would appeal to the Public Utility Commissioners and the state would take over prosecution.

The railroad did not comply with Weinberger and Ackerman's order. On August 3, the police served warrants to the Erie's agent in Passaic along with the company offices in New York City. Police from the respective cities each delivered the warrants. Weinberger, citing Section 188 in the city building ordinance, noted that the railroad continued to maintain a "public nuisance". This warrant served noted that the railroad needed to appear in front of the city police court and Judge Louis Crowley on August 9 to explain their inaction. If the Erie disregarded the warrants, Weinberger stated that the city would then give Ackerman and his workers permission to demolish the building at once unless the railroad attained an injunction to prevent the work. Weinberger felt the decision to have warrants issued was necessary to strong arm the railroad into complying. However, in the face of the warrants, Erie workmen were spotted on the roof of the depot removing shingles from the roof. However, it could not be proven immediately if the railroad was doing this because they decided to comply with the order or if they wanted to go ahead with their own plan of rebuilding the station as they wanted. Noting that it was not the first attempt to try this, Ackerman would be asked to stop them from continuing this work immediately.

State Attorney General Edward L. Katzenbach's office noted to Weinberger that there was no requirement to run to him for the demolition of the depot but to work with J. Vincent Barnett, one of the prosecutors, to see if there were any objections from a criminal standpoint. However, Weinberger noted that city photographers were at the station doing photography for evidence in the case before Erie officials chased them off the property.

The warrants did get the railroad to budge. R.S. Parsons, Vice President and Chief Engineer for the Erie Railroad, worked out a deal on August 10 with other officials to allow the construction of a new depot. Erie officials, along with their attorney John Selser, inspected the remains of the burned-out structure. The day prior, Selser defended the Erie's inaction to Judge Crowley. With a deal reached between the parties, Crowley adjourned the criminal proceedings for a month. Ackerman then issued a demolition permit to the railroad to remove the depot, which would begin on August 15. Parsons noted that the railroad was ready to build the new station. Weinberger, while declaring victory in the case, noted that it was his legal opponent, Sulser, who deserved the most credit for a deal being made.

With the railroad committed to building a new depot, new plans would have to be drawn up instead of the ones used for the failed rebuild. The first proposal in September 1927 resulted in rebuild of a new depot, but no replacement for the Railway Express agency building, which survived the fire. William Margolis, the owner of a local billboard company, circulated a petition to have Railway Express Agency building replaced as part of the construction work. Margolis led the effort by using electronic signage in downtown Passaic, drawing up and spreading the petition, which had attained numerous signatures by September 6. This petition was forwarded to the Passaic Board of Commissioners to be reviewed. Margolis also formed a new committee to inspect the plans by the Erie. Working with Ackerman, Margolis and the committee demanded that the Erie rebuild the Agency and the shelter on the westbound tracks for commuters. In response, he also hosted a conference at the offices of Max Epstein, a real estate agent, on September 10.

At the meeting on September 10, Margolis' committee, Ackerman, Roegner and Epstein, along with the architect supplied by the railroad met to discuss the issues. The new depot would be of stucco construction in a similar design to the old wooden depot that burned. The committee asked that the shelters, baggage room and Railway Express Agency building become stucco and painted to match with the new depot. Margolis noted that the railroad was open to "reasonable demands". The committee also suggested that a ticket office be built on the westbound side of tracks, along with an expanded shelter room close to Monroe Street. There was also discussion on how to handle the pavement around the station on Main Avenue and the committee requested improvement there as well. Roegner noted that the Commissioners would not approve anything until the committee signed off on the plans.

Concerned, Roegner promised Margolis that the Commissioners would do all they could to make sure Margolis' committees concerns were met on a fair discussion level. Margolis, meeting with the Commissioners on September 13, was given the assistance of Commissioner Benjamin Turner, along with Ackerman and Weinberger to sit in on meetings with the railroad. However, Roegner noted that the Erie has some rights over the city that they could use for their own benefit.

The meeting with the final plans up for discussion would come on September 28. At that meeting, Parsons promised the committee that the entire station complex would be replaced. This now included refreshed shelters, roadways, and baggage room. Parsons noted that full designs were filed with Ackerman to ensure this would happen. The baggage room would be rebuilt, the shelters would be repaired and repainted to match the depot. The roadways and approach at Passaic station would be resurfaced as well. Due to American Express maintaining the Express Agency, there could be no promises made on its replacement. Parsons did offer that the railroad would join up with Margolis to convince American Express to let that be rebuilt. Margolis noted he would begin discussion immediately.

One final, but minor, dispute came between Margolis' committee and the railroad in October 1927. Margolis, concerned about the lack of progress on getting construction started, reached out to Parsons through his assistant. The assistant told Margolis that the bids for the new Passaic station were higher than the railroad had budgeted for the project, and as a result, they had to talk to the executives for extra monetary funds to build the station as Margolis and Parsons had agreed to. The assistant noted that the matter was basically settled and the railroad executives would soon give their go-ahead. Margolis did tell the assistant that they wanted construction started before the winter started. By November 12, a bidder had been selected, the J.J. O'Leary Contracting Company of Passaic. The Erie had not yet signed the contract with the company, but it was expected that if the contract was signed within a week that the construction would start without any further delays.

Construction wrapped up in March 1928. On March 9, the new station depot in Passaic opened for business. The depot, painted with white stucco and a green finish, with mahogany seating for passengers. The new station contained eight individual telephone booths in the waiting room, which gained a tile floor. (The previous station was a wooden floor and had only six booths.) The station's older sections (not damaged by fire), were given the new fresh paint job to match. Lee Bailey, the station agent when the fire occurred in December 1926, continued to be in charge.

=== Track elimination returns to the forefront (1927–1928) ===
The track elevation/depression project returned to the forefront in November 1928 when the Passaic Chamber of Commerce held another meeting talking about the project. At this point, the numbers of $3 million (1928 USD) for elevation and $7 million for depression were still the primary focus. By this time, the railroad remained noncommittal about adjusting the tracks in either fashion. Restarting from the beginning, Roegner announced that they would form a new citizen's committee to work on getting the Erie to listen.

A previous committee had met on March 9, 1927, and May 2, 1928, with the railroad on getting details again on their intentions. At the November 1928 meeting, the results of both explained that the depression would involve Main Avenue being depressed at a rate of 28 feet (8.5 m) underground for a width of four tracks. The crossings at Aycrigg and Lafayette Avenues would gain pedestrian subways while the crossing at Paulison Avenue would be closed entirely. If construction were to occur for depression, the tracks would be moved onto the active right-of-way for the trolley tracks along Main. All businesses that had contract work with the Erie would have to build elevators to help be served with freights. The railroad also stood by that they would continue to use steam locomotives in a depression rather than convert to electricity. Passaic officials showed concern that with steam locomotives, there would be a lot of steam and smoke emitted from the depression, resulting in health and nuisance issues. The other issue would involve the cost of adjusting the various utility lines would also be involved, ballooning a $5.857 million project to around $7 million.

With the elevation concept, the Erie Railroad conceptualized an elevated line using concrete pillars similar to the construction of the Delaware, Lackawanna and Western Railroad at their Van Houten Avenue crossing and through the Oranges in Essex County. These new pillars would be 18 feet (5.5 m) tall and 20 feet (6.1 m) apart. In this fashion, the new railroad tracks would not interfere with current track operation, ensuring the railroad and the trolleys could still use it. The city would also have the right to acquire the old right-of-way under the tracks for parking. In this fashion, Aycrigg and Lafayette would still be pedestrian subways and Paulison would still be closed. With all other incidental charges, the total would come to $3 million.

The committee prepared photography of the proposed elevation and explained where they stood. Roegner noted that the city did not have the finances right now to help fund the project as high tax rates caused manufacturers to threaten leaving the city. Roegner also added that the city would not agree to any track elimination until the railroad agreed to electrifying the railroad tracks, instead of steam engines. The mayor added that Passaic would be better off if the project was sent to a vote by the citizens on elevation versus depression. Present at the meeting, George Fanning explained the reasoning to why the Erie was not planning on electrifying the tracks, stating that they could not electrify only a two-track line through the city, noting that the Pennsylvania Railroad and Delaware, Lackawanna and Western were installing it on four-track lines.

Local merchants represented at the meeting noted to the Chamber that they were not ready for such a project and that they should consider multiple options, including a tunnel through Passaic that eliminated much of the curves and/or the track depression proposal. One merchant got heated and accused the railroad of running its operations poorly until being told to stop berating by the Chamber of Commerce Chairman.

=== Campaigns for track elimination (1931–1938) ===
==== 1931 campaign ====
After plans for track elimination in Passaic slowed following 1928, the Grover Cleveland Democratic Club began a new campaign to get the Erie tracks in the city removed. On March 23, 1931, members of the club voted unanimously in their hall on Main Avenue to pass a resolution for the elimination of the railroad tracks in the city. At that point they agreed to circulate petitions through Passaic to get their demands heard. The club also appointed a pair of members who were local lawyers to start finding out what they could do in their efforts through legal measures. David Hammer and David Bayarsky, the members appointed to pursue legal measures, prepared a report for an April 6 meeting about their options.

The next attempt to get the process going came in June 1933. The Chamber of Commerce and the Board of Commissioners looked at a new proposal to eliminate the tracks through the city. The Passaic Herald-News interviewed Frederick Rollins Low, a former Mayor of Passaic and engineer, in his hospital bed at St. Mary's Hospital. This set of plans was similar to the old ones, except that the proposal involved utilizing the National Industrial Recovery Act instituted by President Franklin Delano Roosevelt. Low told the paper that he supported all plans that would involve bringing the tracks underground, rather than through an open cut or elevation over the tracks. The latter two proposals he felt would not reap the benefits of the cost to the city, as noise and smoke levels would still be an issue and beautification would be near impossible. Low noted that they would still, however, eliminate the traffic issues in the city.

==== Levy campaign (1933–1935) ====
The Passaic Chamber of Commerce met on June 26 for a luncheon and explained their stance on the project noting that tunneling was the only option they felt would function. Louis Levy, the president of the Central Supply Company in Passaic, was named chairperson of a new committee to work on obtaining a grant from the federal government for the project. This committee included Just Justessen, John Farrell, Abe Schiner and Barthold DeMattia working alongside Levy. Russell Wise, the President of the Chamber, noted that the committee would interact with Erie Railroad officials to see if tunneling was an option in their eyes, along with federal officials to check if grants were available. Wise noted that the tunneling would be around the same cost as an open cut. This version would enter a tunnel at Passaic Park station and re-enter grade near the Clifton city line. They noted that ventilation shafts would also have to be built for such a design. The Eastside Merchants Association of Passaic also threw their support behind tunnel proposal the next day.

Levy noted that the special grant from the state of New Jersey would only give $1.5 million for local projects, talking to the Kiwanis of Passaic on June 29. Members of the Kiwanis in Passaic passed a resolution stating that they want a share of the grant from the New Jersey State Highway Commission. The resolution also requested the Board of Commissioners to come up with projects that meet the National Industrial Recovery Act criteria. The Kiwanis felt that they would get between $100,000–150,000. William Margolis noted that any grant money would go in helping get unemployed residents of Passaic back to work. Levy told the Kiwanis that the depression plan was not going to be anything other than top priority. Levy also noted that he wrote to Colonel Donald H. Sawyer of the Public Works Administration to look at information on how to get financing for the project.

The Chamber of Commerce Board of Directors met on March 14, 1934, approving a resolution to ask the city Board of Commissioners to re-open the Board of Public Utility Commissioners case for the track depression. This decision was made after the study done by Louis Levy and his committee finished, noting that Passaic would not be required to spend any money in the $7 million project. If the elevation of tracks was the only plan considered by the Board of Public Utility Commissioners, they would reserve the right to withdraw the request for a hearing. C. Edwin Williams, the Secretary, forwarded a request on March 19 to the city because the city's Finance Director would be the only one allowed under state law to file for re-opening a Board of Public Utility Commissioners case. Levy noted that the city gave informal advice that they would be willing to do so.

By January 1935, the Board of Public Utility Commissioners did recommend that the Passaic track project should be approved by the United States Secretary of the Interior. If and when a new funding set would be authorized, $50 million would be available for grade crossing elimination projects. The belief was that the Passaic group of 13 would still cost around $5 million and be part of the elimination of 228 crossings through the state.

The United States House of Representatives passed the $4.88 billion public works bill in February 1935, and on February 5, the city of Passaic passed a resolution noting that the city informed the Public Works Administration's New Jersey representatives that they had jobs available for unemployed people to work, but no money to serve as wages for those people. The resolution account for $7 million in projects, but left the door open for more. It was passed on February 5 because the city was required to report their interests by February 11. Levy also gathered a group of citizens at his house in Passaic to discuss the positive signs for the track elimination project. At that meeting, depression was unanimously agreed on over elevation and that it would be easier to convince the government to do so because more people would be employed if done as a depression.

However, by February 27, the progress stalled once again. The bill had not been approved by the United States Senate yet and the Erie did not respond to the city's request for a conference between the railroad, Passaic and the Public Utility Commission to come up with plans. Because the Erie owned the tracks, they would have to be the one to create the new plans for track elimination and Passaic would be left with the option of agreeing or denying. Levy, City Engineer Morris Mandl and Mayor John Johnson were ready whenever the Erie would be ready to have a meeting and not give up.

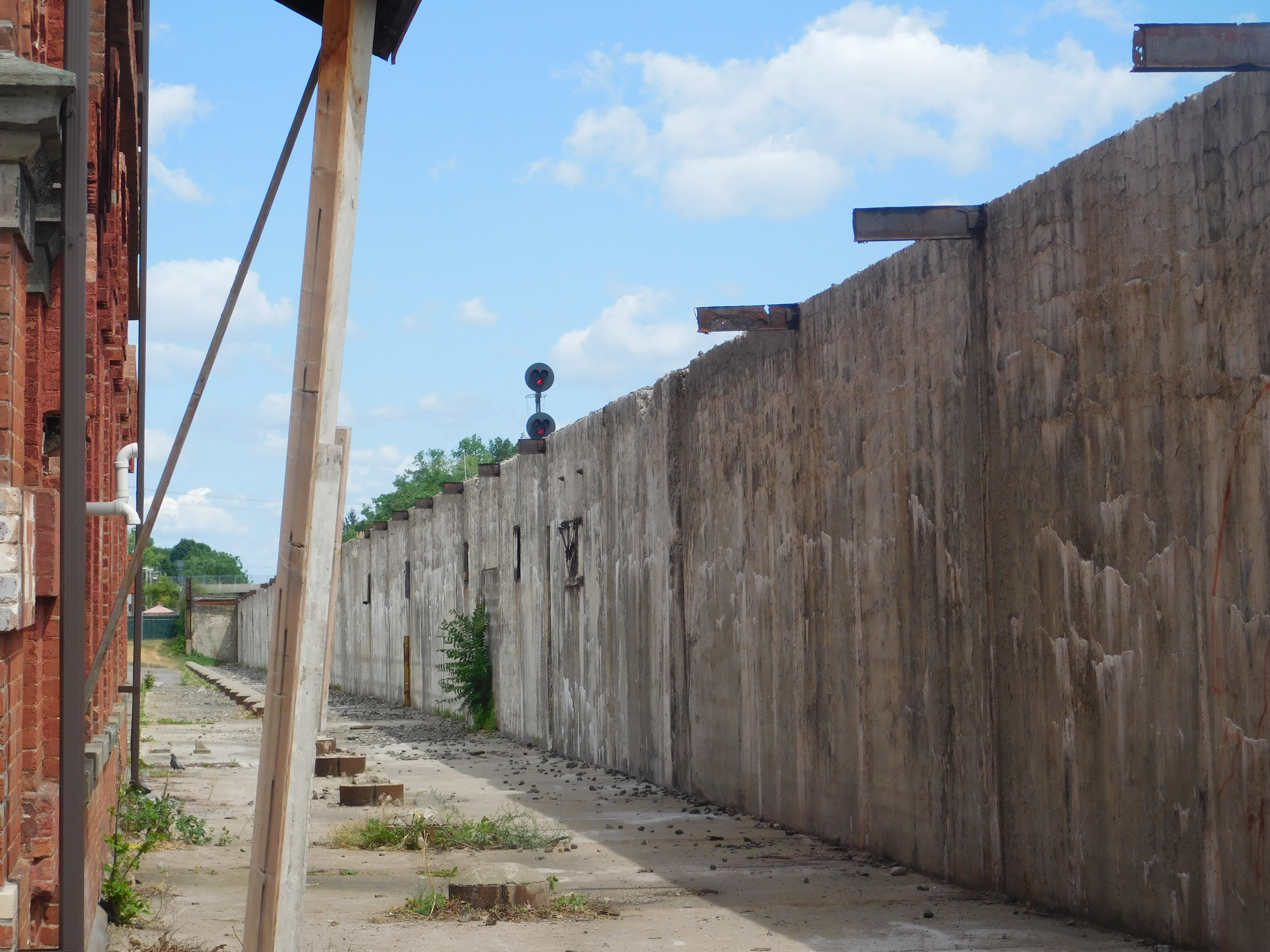
The retaining wall for the elevated tracks in Elmira, New York

By March 27, Mayor Johnson forwarded a letter to the Public Utility Commission at the behest of the Chamber of Commerce. The letter felt that since the Senate seemed likely to pass the appropriation bill. The executives of the Chamber of Commerce felt it was necessary to re-open the 1915 application to the Public Utility Commission to get progress made. The 1915 proposal had blueprints and other specifications ready to go with a cost of $6 million. Mandl noted that the Public Utility Commission engineer Charles Mead stated that Passaic had a good chance of acquiring the funding from the Public Works Administration. However, they would still have problems with the method of which track elimination would be dealt with. If the funding is limited, they would propose elevation instead. However, the Public Utility Commission noted that the city of Passaic did not need such a request. Emmett Drew, the secretary of the commission, stated that new public hearings were not necessary if federal funding was available, provided that they were using the similar plans and details from the October 1928 hearings. Drew also stated that if the city wanted to file a new request, they could. Mandl and George Fanning also discussed that the situation in Passaic was similar to the problems in Elmira, New York, prior to elevation there. Fanning showed Mandl photos of the work in Elmira to elevate tracks and why it was successful. This however lacked the angle showing how it would work in Passaic.

By April 14, Levy noted that government would help pay for the grade crossing project. President Roosevelt himself made the same declaration. The belief was that New Jersey would get approximately $49,861,760 out of $100–200 million for grade crossing elimination projects. Harry Bacharach, the President of the Public Utility Commission, submitted the project list in January for the 228 eliminated crossings (along with 274 others that would get proper protection). They would then prioritize which projects were most dangerous to pedestrians and motorists alike. This included $12.22 million for the elimination of the crossings in Passaic. However, the land acquisition costs would be on the municipality rather than the federal government.

During the election campaign for new city Commissioners in May 1935, the elimination of the tracks through downtown Passaic were the main priority. However, C.F. Bedwell, a construction engineer for the New Jersey State Highway Commission, told a local Parent-Teachers' Association that the new funding bill would not come up with enough money to be constructed. The amount given from the federal government to the state would be less than the amount of the entire state program.

==== Martini takes over (1935) ====
The City Commissioners, led by Roegner, would accept an invitation July 8, 1935, from Louis Levy to meet with engineers from the Erie Railroad, except that it would be public rather than at Levy's house. Levy arranged to have H.F. King, the railroad's special engineer, along with Fanning to the city for a July 10 conference. Roegner stated that the plans drawn up by Colin Wise would be better than the depression or elevation projects proposed at this time. Wise, presuming that the railroads would all eventually move to electric power, would have a tunnel through the city, and a station under Passaic City Hall. Newly elected mayor Benjamin Turner noted that Street Director Nicholas Martini should take the lead and look at the old Wise plans. Roegner felt that they could use the 1922 survey and use its extra suggestions that were financially impossible before the government project.

Martini and Turner made the trip to Trenton on July 11 to go lobby the State Highway Commission to get federal funding for the Passaic track elimination. At the meeting with Erie engineers the day prior, the Erie once again threw support behind elevation, but the Passaic brass did not. King noted that the city would have the Erie's support if they went and got the funding for the project, but stated the railroad would not have enough money to fund the project and it would have to be completely externally funded. Martini, concerned about the Erie's commitment level, made the Erie agree to be a party on the application for fuds. Weinberger suggested that the city apply under the Fielder Act of 1930, which would provide funding up to 50% from the railroad and 50% of government financing. The city would then do a second application, this time with the Public Works Administration, followed by a third with the Works Progress Administration. Doing these would result in forcing the Erie to assist.

Levy stated that there was $800 million in grants available and that the city could get special consideration from the Public Utility Commission to federal government funding. Martini felt that a new route could be done to run the depressed tracks along River Drive, McLean Street, along with Hoover and Lexington Avenues before reaching the current line at Harrison Street, removing tracks from Main Avenue period, but would take much longer to construct. Instead Martini recommended just using the plans on file. King stated they preferred elevation because it would eliminate much of the smoke that would be a community nuisance. The city continue to veto this proposal because they were afraid of the look of the community after construction. Martini stated that there were plans to meet with Public Works Administration officials and Governor Harold G. Hoffman, noting that the Erie needed to send a representative and King agreed to that.

The July 11 meeting did not net positive results. The statements by Bedwell in May were matched by state officials. The State Highway Commission only had $3.9 million for grade crossing projects. Martini went ahead with Weinberger's request to file under the Fielder Act. The city of Elizabeth did something similar the same week, 45% of the project would be funded by the federal government, 5% by the railroad and 50% from the Public Utility Commission funds for grade crossing elimination. In this case, the Erie would be obligated for 5% of the deal. E. Donald Sterner, the State Highway Commissioner, stated that Passaic would project would not likely be considered for funding because the costs would eat the entire grant and that he intended to spread the money through the state to eliminate numerous crossings. Sterner agreed about the Fielder Law approach suggested by Weinberger. Martini stated that they would insist on the depression plan and felt they could get the railroad absorb 5% of the cost. However, there was optimism that the projects submitted to the federal government were not enough to satisfy the amount of employment that they requested. Martini's belief was that the railroad project would provide over 5.9 million labor hours for 2,000 men to work 390 eight-hour days.

Weinberger filed the request under the Fielder Act on July 16, requesting a new hearing with the Public Utility Commission. This would be using the petition from 1917, which Weinberger included a letter from Emmett Drew stating that they wanted a new hearing as soon as possible. The letter also requested that the Erie, the Passaic Valley Water Commission and New Jersey Bell Telephone (along with other parties) be informed when a hearing was scheduled. Weinberger filed another request on September 3 with the Public Utility Commission to attain progress on the project. Meade stated that a quick date would be scheduled as soon as possible.

However, a letter sent by Fanning upset Martini in mid-September. Fanning's letter stated that the new plan suggested by Martini would be much too expensive and the railroad would be unable to finish the study in a reasonable time period. Fanning stated that the railroad needed to focus instead on the plans that were involved with federal funding. Martini was upset with the letter and at a meeting in his office with Williams and levy, stated that he was determined to get the project forward. Martini stated that he felt Fanning and Erie executives were upset the city did not accept their elevation proposals. The Engineering Department at the railroad reached out to Martini and stated that the railroad would give their full support behind any plan Martini preferred. In that time period, Martini pushed all local organizations to step up and demand the railroad work with the city. Martini told the press that the railroad will continue on a reasonable pace and cooperate with the city on feasibility.

The Public Utility Commission announced the date of a new hearing, November 20, in late September 1935. The city would be represented by Weinberger, Martini and new City Engineer John Schneider while the railroad would likely be represented by Fanning and two engineers. Neither side agreed on how they wanted to handle this project, with the Erie officials continuing to favor the elevation project over the depression, with the city preferred.

With the meeting approaching, Levy made arrangements for a demonstration at the Passaic Armory near the river. This included the Reverend Dr. George H. Talbott Committee, along with the Gerald V. Carroll Post Committee. Levy also opened the door to any other organization who wanted to join the demonstration. At that point they would make plans for second demonstration in Newark, however, Martini requested that the meeting held off until the Board of Commissioners explained its plans.

The Passaic Board of Commissioners held a special meeting on November 4 to ensure its final plans for the November 20 hearing. They also authorized another traffic study for five of the 13 crossings for $350. Turner felt that it was a poor decision to have Martini be the lead on the hearing, feeling that they could not approve Martini's alternate plans over the original Wise-created designs. They agreed 4–0 to approve a depression plan, eliminating interest in elevation. Martini stated that if the hearing came before September 1, they would have had a proper time period to get a Works Progress Administration grant. With the new traffic study, 30 people would be stationed at Washington Place, Passaic, Jefferson and Monroe Streets and Gregory Avenue for five days. Having done so would fuel the plan being ready for presentation on November 20.

==== Demonstrations and hearings (1935–1936) ====
The first public demonstration occurred on November 15 at the Hotel Lincoln's Ritz Ballroom on Henry Street. The group of attendees got stronger over the hearing. Speakers at this event included Weinberger, Martini, Levy, Talbott, Turner, along with his secretary William Okulski, Roger Brett (the president of the Chamber of Commerce), and Arthur Corbin, a former Passaic city lawyer. Turner stated the history of the track elimination project. Levy took the railroad to notice for their failure to act, citing the project in Elmira as an example of how it has been done and that George Fanning was on lead for that. Dr. Talbott reminded attendees that they should not be convinced by the Erie that a depression project was impossible. Martini followed, speaking of the results of the traffic study and the plans for the November 20 meeting. Martini cited the Jefferson Street crossing numbers that on Saturday, November 9, 1935, 9,910 automobiles, 1,191 trucks, 32 tankers, 145 buses and 19,550 pedestrians utilized the crossing. Martini also stated that the alternate plan he has is open to the Erie, but it would be an elevation out of downtown. At the meeting, a resolution was adopted for the official petition to the Public Utility Commission, stating that they wanted the railroad ordered to do the project. Commander Clarence D. Finn of the Carroll Post stated that they would leave Passaic's City Hall on November 20 at 10:00 a.m. for a demonstration in Newark. The group made arrangements to provide cars to drive demonstrators to the meeting.

The hearing on November 20 in Newark was packed to capacity, with 200 people making the trip from Passaic. Weinberger opened the hearing for the city, stating that it was re-opening the 1913 and 1915 petitions. Weinberger noted that they were ready to prove that they have a strong argument for an order to get the project done by the commission. Before the witnesses could start their testimony, Judge Filbert Rosenstein of Paterson, serving as a representative of the Paterson and Hudson River Railroad, asked to be excluded because the Erie was leasing the tracks. He requested that any orders would only be applied to the operator, the Erie Railroad, and not the original company.

The first response to Weinberger's commentary is that George S. Hobart noted that they never received a full copy of the petition. Hobart stated that he was alright with the city continuing its case even though the Erie was not prepared to respond to this hearing. Weinberger responded by asking the commission to force the Erie to file an answer to the petition in a short period of time. Henry Whitehead, the Finance Director, was the first witness. He stated that he was a resident of Passaic for approximately 50 years, he also identified numerous photographs of the crossings that Weinberger showed him. Hobart promptly objected to this stating that the railroad was entitled to copies and one of the commissioners ordered that it would occur. Whitehead also used the Jefferson Street crossing statistics as his argument that the crossings were dangerous. Hobart cross-examined Whitehead, who stated that all 13 crossings were dangerous as well. Talbott, a resident of 12 years, testified next, stating that he felt the crossings were dangerous to the city's children. Hobart asked Talbott if he had ever seen an accident at one of the 13 crossings. Talbott noted that he had seen a truck have its rear removed by a train c. 1930.

At the hearing, Weinberger also produced evidence denoting the information that the crossings killed six people in the previous five years, along with 86 other accidents. After doing so, Thomas Hanson, the Public Utility Commissioner, announced that the hearing would be adjourned under December 12, 1935 and that the Erie Railroad had 15 days to file a response to the petition. Martini stated that he would provide Hobart and John Straw (representing the Public Service Company) maps that day.

The Erie finished their response in early December 1935. It would end up being served to Weinberger by December 10. Martini put together new witnesses for the city, including Reverend William Dunn of the St. Nicholas Catholic Church, who would testify about the dangers of his parochial school students crossing the tracks. Dr. Arthur Arnold, the city Superintendent, provided public school data on the same subject for the previous hearing. Assistant Fire Chief William Coffey would be a second witness for the city, stating the delays the crossings were causing to fire response times. Schneider would also continue testimony on the study data and provide new data.

At the December 12 hearing, things became contentious. Duane Minard and Joseph Weinberger conflicted multiple times verbally. While Coffey was testifying, Minard interrupted the hearing to state that the Erie Railroad could not afford to eliminate the crossings. Weinberger countered that the railroad did the same thing with the Paterson track elimination, but that one reached the Supreme Court of the United States and Paterson won, forcing the Erie to start the work within a year and a half of the decision. Weinberger stated that if the railroad was ordered to start work, they would. Minard did not respond to Weinberger's statements, but did request that the Commission place the application into suspension, which was denied. A third hearing was set for January 16, 1936.

However, Martini requested a postponement of the January 16, 1936, meeting. The Commission agreed to postpone it until January 30. The same occurred on January 30, with another postponement until February 13.

At the February 13 meeting, Martini proposed to the Commission his alternative plan for the elevated structure that would not run on Main Avenue. This total would come to $3,979,075, a lower number than the depression plan. The total would include the land acquisition, track and switch installation, another new depot and various legal fees and expenses. Martini would note that a new bridge would be built 1,200 feet (370 m) north of the active drawbridge over the Passaic River. The right-of-way would then cross River Drive and cross Van Wagoner Place before running along the current right-of-way from Paulison to Pennington Avenues. From there it would run on McLean Street before turning onto Ann Street and Washington Place. It would then follow Hoover Avenue for the rest of the alignment. It would then hit the current right-of-way in Clifton.

Minard opposed letting this alternative plan be entered into the official record as evidence. Minard and Weinberger had another loud argument with choice words, followed by Minard cross-examining Martini about the details and the numbers. Minard then claimed that the railroad was there first and Main Avenue came second, meaning it would not be the principal road in Passaic. He also asked how the city was planning to acquire the right-of-way for this project, to which Martini responded that the city could use condemnation or purchase methods to do so. However, against Minard's wishes, the Public Utility Commission allowed the alternative plan into the official evidence record.

Weinberger, however, decided that even if the Erie decided to fight Martini's plan, they would just go back to the original proposal of track depression. Weinberger stated that the railroad was asking for alternatives to the depression plan the city wished to proceed with, noting that Martini's option was a suggestion due to its cheaper finances. The hearing was adjourned until March 5 so Erie engineers and Minard could go over the Martini proposal and check what their financial numbers would be.

Minard, speaking to the press off-record, stated that they did not own the right-of-way, but leased it, stating that they would not be involved in plans that involved creating a new right-of-way. Minard also stated that the commission could not authorize a new right-of-way legally. The attorney also questioned the law in which the city filed under, noting that it obligated the railroad to a "reasonable expenditure" and not the amounts the city was asking for. Because of that, he felt the city would not get the approval they wished.

On the morning of March 5, prior to the hearing, Commissioners George Hanson and Harry Bacharach, along with their assistant counsel, John Berhardt, agreed to let Martini filed for Public Works Administration funding for the tracks. At the hearing, John Schneider testified that the depression plan would cost about $5.84 million and officially submitted the plan designs. John Straw, the attorney for the Public Service Electric and Gas Company, questioned the figure Schneider provided for the relocation of utilities (around $35,000). Schneider stated that the figure was an estimate, not an official engineering number. Hobart, the Erie's counsel, declined to cross-examine Schneider due to late arrival of details. Hobart also requested more details from Schneider to provide after the hearing, to Weinberger's displeasure, noting it was another delay tactic. Hanson overruled Weinberger and ordered that the railroad be provided the details.

Rosenstein, still representing the Paterson and Hudson River Railroad, filed an official objection to the Martini alternate, finding issues with the requirement that 2.5 miles (4.0 km) of track would have to be relocated. Rosenstein felt that the best approach is depression or elevation of the current right-of-way on Main Avenue. Hanson noted the objection, but did not remove the Martini alternate. Hanson then adjourned the hearing until March 19.

At the March 19 meeting, Minard cross-examined Schneider on all the figures presented by the City Engineer two weeks prior. The elevation plan now also had an estimate of $2.464 million alongside the prior estimates for a track depression. Schneider noted under examination that in both proposals, parts where land acquisition was not necessary resulted in estimates over actual hard numbers. Minard asked Schneider if he included the industrial properties who would have to release land for the project and stated that those were also estimates. These estimates included $21,000 for the Anderson Lumber Company, $8400 for the Consolidated Dairy Products property and $50,000 for Shell Petroleum's tanks and property in Rutherford. Multiple other companies would be affected, including the Standard Blachery in the Carlton Hill section of Rutherford, Passaic Transit Concrete Company and Mexican Petroleum. Minard asked Schneider if the engineer had taken it account that the companies would be forced to relocate due to lack of usable land. Schneider stated that he had not and that he had not personally contacted the companies about it. Minard then asked about the Passaic Armory, which would lose property in the proposal. Schneider repeated that these were all estimates and not an appraisal.

After Minard finished the cross-examination of Schneider, Weinberger rested the case for the city. During the afternoon session, the assistant comptroller of the railroad, Thomas Tobin, stated to the Commission that the railroad owed $31 million in loans to the United States Government and could not fund any track elimination project. Weinberger goaded an answer out of Tobin that the United States Government had raised freight rates on April 18, 1935, resulting in an increased income for the railroad. Weinberger also presented the evidence provided by Tobin that the railroad had bought only $11 million in new equipment in the previous five years and charged $21.9 million in depreciation costs. The Public Utility Commission then requested the Erie furnish more details on why the railroad could not afford this project and adjourned the meeting until April 9. However, this hearing had to be a postponed until May 7 as Weinberger needed to represent the city at the New Jersey State Tax Board.

Tobin was cross-examined again by Weinberger at the May 7 hearing. This time the Assistant Comptroller told the lawyer that the railroad lost $172,168 from January–March 1936. Weinberger stated that the railroad paid $12.5 million in interest, but kept over $6.54 million in their banks. Tobin also admitted that most of the railroad is operated on leases rather than ownership. Weinberger asked Tobin how the railroad could spend over $3 million on improvements while posting a deficit of only $800,000, to which Tobin responded that they borrowed money. Weinberger criticized the financial reports provided by the Erie but was struck down by Hanson. In the report, Tobin noted that the operating revenues were $19.341 million while the expenses were only $14.237 million. Weinberger asked Tobin what the railroad paid in salaries, but was objected to by Minard, though Tobin answered before the objection could be registered. Tobin stated that the railroad salaries were not specifically in any financial account, but broken up into multiple. Minard objected the question of Weinberger about the brokers fees, to which Hanson sustained the motion. Weinberger's last question was whether the railroad had borrowed any money in 1936, to which Tobin stated they had not.

Henry S. King, the special engineer, followed Tobin on the stand, providing estimates and blueprints on the elevation, with a total of $2.383 million on the project. Weinberger objected to the admission of the elevation plan into the evidence, but Hanson allowed it, citing Martini's proposal as the precedent. However, Weinberger cross-examined King and King admitted that he had not come up with his own estimate on depression as the numbers provided by Schneider were close to accurate.

The railroad changed its tactics at the May 7 hearing, with Minard trying to convince the Commission that the 13 grade crossings were well protected. The belief was that this change was to undermine Passaic's argument that the railroad crossings were unsafe for drivers and pedestrians. Weinberger, in cross-examination of the New York Division Superintendent A.L. Kline, asked if the railroad crossings impede and slow down traffic and Kline responded that they did. Kline also produced detail about the freight sidings in Passaic and the effect a grade crossing elimination project would do to them. He also felt that of the 89 trains that crossed the line daily, multiple would block the Jefferson Street crossing while sitting in the station. Weinberger got Kline to confess that the superintendt, who claimed he was there regularly, had only been in Passaic five times since February 1936. Kline also admitted that the crossing project would not affect any freight siding except the ones between Harrison Street and Lexington Avenue. Kline continued to downplay the effect on the city of the crossings, stating that they were all clear from a 20–25 feet (6.1–7.6 m) distance away.

Martin Cooper, the railroad crossing supervisor for the Erie, stated that as of December 1936, Passaic police were stationed at most of the 13 crossings from 7:00 a.m. and 11:00 p.m. The supervisor noted that the gatemen were only stationed there from 7:00 a.m. to 7:00 p.m. Cooper also downplayed the steepness of the Lafayette Avenue crossing, where there were no protections. The railroad in response had installed a bell and indicator lights to denote the arrival of a train. After the testimony of Victor Wellman, the Erie's taxation clerk, Minard stated that he was out of witnesses for the day but had at least three more before ending its case. The meeting was adjourned until May 25 and May 26.

The May 25 hearing brought Robert C. Falconer, the Assistant Vice President, to the witness stand. Falconer continued to insist the railroad could not afford the Passaic elimination as the railroad did not have funding for any large-scale projects. Falconer stated that the railroad could not do so for several years until the railroad would have enough business to justify the expense. Falconer used figures dating back to 1927 to make his argument, noting that the railroad has not spent money on replacements of equipment to the degree that they were retiring said equipment. The Assistant Vice President also stated that the railroad would be doing the same in 1936, but was reliant under the credit status. Weinberger cross-examined Falconer asking if he was there when similar excuses were used by the railroad in the Paterson petition in 1913. Falconer stated that he did not remember the reasons but that he had testified at a 1913 hearing. He stated that he could not recall if the Erie had used poor financial status as a reason to not do the Paterson crossing elimination.

Weinberger continued the questioning about salaries for the railroad he had started with Tobin, though objected to by Minard. Falconer did admit that salary cuts from 1929 were restored in 1935. Weinberger also questioned Falconer's status as a qualified witness on the railroad's finances, resulting in an argument with Minard. However, Weinberger got an answer out of Faulkner, who admitted that his testimony was merely opinion, continuing the argument that it would be several years before the railroad could be able to undertake it. The hearing was then adjourned until June 8 instead of May 26.

Despite Weinberger's request, Falconer was unable to attend the hearing due to being in another state at the time for business. In response, Hanson let Weinberger read into evidence the testimony of Falconer on November 4, 1914, in the Paterson case. Weinberger did so since Falconer had been unable to remember what he had testified. Falconer noted in that hearing that the railroad had $55 million in improvements that were more important over the elimination of grade crossings in Paterson.

Minard brought a new defense to the June 8 hearing. Minard stated that after checking the recent reversals by the Supreme Court, one of which was on the appeal of the Nashville, Chattanooga and St. Louis Railroad. The Supreme Court ruled the mandate by the railroad to pay for half of a project was unconstitutional. Minard stated that the court felt that the grade crossing elimination was a benefit to the railroad and automobile traffic, making the burden not only on the railroad.

At the time, the June 8 hearing was expected to be the last of the hearings on the petition from November 1935.

However, this occurred on June 15, 1936. Weinberger attacked the decision made by the Supreme Court and asked that it not affect the decision by the commission. Hanson informed Weinberger that he knew of the decision and felt he would value its merits. Harry Schoen, the counsel for the County of Passaic, noted that they would back the city of Passaic as the Board of Freeholders noted they wanted him to support anything that got county-maintained road crossings eliminated. Martini backed up his argument stating that elevation would continue to impede traffic, hurt property values, create a health problem and make noise worse. Martini stated that if approved, the work would be done over a three-year span, requiring less of a financial investment at once. Martini also put in the Interstate Commerce Commission's reports from 1933 to 1935 on grade crossing accidents to have them entered to evidence. Schneider also testified again, backing up Martini, stating that property values around Elmira, New York dropped when the railroad was elevated.

At the end of the hearing, Hanson stated they were entering a conference phase and that they would have the decision likely by early July. Hanson also noted that the Commission did not have the money to fund it for 1936, noting that $2 million had already been spent.

==== Delays (1936–1937) ====
Despite an expectation that a ruling would be made in July 1936, the hearing was delayed significantly. On October 29, Emmett Drew informed Weinberger that the case was in still in a conference status. That message to Weinberger was the first either party had heard since the ending of the hearings on June 15.

However, on October 14, Martini met with officials from the Public Works Administration who traveled from Washington, D.C., to discuss the request for funding. Meeting with Colonel Elmer Clark, Martini asked that the government agency speed up processing the application and making a decision even though the Public Utility Commission had not rendered a decision. Martini proposed to Clark the plans for depression and the Martini alternative. Martini informed Clark that 2,500 men were available if it were approved and it would keep over 100 in work for around 30 months and that extra men would be available once other federal projects were completed in Passaic County. Clark told the Commissioner that the proposals were "feasible, desirable and eligible under PWA regulations."

The delay of the Public Utility Commission continued into 1937 and came to a head when the railroad filed for a new hearing on March 18. The railroad requested in the petition for a hearing that the focus should be on elevation over depression and cited 11 different reasons for doing so. Martini and Weinberger stated at a meeting of the Passaic City Commissioners that they would continue to oppose any elevation project. The Public Utility Commissioners took the request into consideration.

To make things worse for the city, the Public Works Administration noted on March 26 that they were about to reject the grant for the city of Passaic because of the lack of progress by the Public Utility Commission. The Public Works Administration could not consider a petition from any party that was not a state-operated utility commission and as a result, Martini could not serve as the party. The Assistant Administrator Horatio B. Hackett noted that a hearing would be held before the official rejection would be authorized and it could happen any day within the next week.

Martini went to Washington, D.C., on April 1 to attend the hearing. At that hearing, Martini convinced the Public Works Administration to not reject the application outright and hold on any further action until the Public Utility Commission made their decision. The Commissioner also stated that he would arrange a conference with the Public Utility Commissioners on finding out how to speed up the decision. Hackett agreed to the reinstatement, reiterating that the Public Works Administration liked the project and the number of workers it would employ.

By May 1937, the continued delays by the Public Utility Commission began to upset Martini. Stating he was getting "waltzed around", he told Harry Bacharach on May 28 that he would start a campaign to have the Commission discontinued if a decision was not made soon. Martini felt that the lack of a decision was showing favoritism to the railroad over the city. He also accused the Commission of being neglectful of its duties to the residents of New Jersey. He reminded Bacharach that the city was entitled to a prompt decision and suffering four more pedestrian deaths since the hearings concluded. Martini reiterated that on May 14 a gateman had been found sleeping on the job and not lowering the gates for an oncoming train during a storm and discharged after being arrested. Martini send a telegram of the May 14 incident on May 15 to Hanson and never got a response.

Rumors broke out in mid-July 1937 that the commission had axed the depression proposal made by the city of Passaic but supported the elevation project. The elevation project would be a 50–50 split between the railroad and the state. The Commissioners felt the depression project would cost too much money compared to elevation, which would provide adequate parking under the tracks. Martini heard from the Public Utility Commission in late July 1937 that the expectation was an answer "any day now".

On August 19, the Public Utility Commission announced that it would have a new hearing on September 24 to work on the Martini alternate plan for elevation off of Main Avenue. Emmett Drew stated that the city and railroad both requested the hearing to get more testimonies as to financing and engineering. The proposal would cost approximately $4.55 million with the railroad financing 45 percent of the project. Martini noted that the parties had met on August 5 in private and agreed to the new hearing, along with explaining more details about the alternative elevation project. At that meeting, the parties agreed that if the amount of the costs between state, railroad and the Works Progress Administration were not enough to finish the project, the former two parties would find a route to get funding. Submitting extra data for the alternative plan would allow an order to be made to force the railroad to comply with the project and give $2.25 million of funding. It was also announced that the new station would be located at the intersection of Hoover Avenue and Madison Street.

However, Roosevelt stated publicly in late September that no more federal funding would be available for public works endeavors. Martini reiterated on September 22 his confidence for the funding to be granted and a positive result in the hearing on September 24.

==== Campaign collapse (September 1937 – March 1938) ====
By the morning of September 24, the word that elevation was the only accepted proposal caused a furor among residents. The Passaic Chamber of Commerce and some major citizens were not opposed to the elevation proposal, but it was noted that they would be less affected by the new project. Property owners of Hoover and Lexington Avenues, Park Place, McLean, Quincy, Jackson, Harrison, Autumn and Sherman Streets all felt that they would be affected and planned to protest at the Utilities Commission offices. Residents of the Fourth Ward in the city felt that their property values and the community would fall apart if the railroad came through their area. They also hired an engineer who felt that the plan could not be finished for less than $5 million, as was proposed by Martini. Two churches in Passaic, Our Lady of Mt. Carmel Church, at McLean and Park, and St. Nicholas Roman Catholic Church at Washington and State were going to protest on September 24 as well.

However, the biggest blow to the project came on September 24 when Mayor Benjamin Turner announced his opposition to the Martini alternative plan. Turner had previously voted in support of the elevation plan, stunning Martini when he changed his tuned. Right before the hearing was to adjourn until October 1, Turner asked that the objectors get a chance to express their reasons. Turner stated that he felt the opposition by residents and had been approached by multiple churches and it was enough to ask that they suspend the proceedings until the residents had their say. Bachrach allowed Martini to read the November 4, 1935, Passaic Board of Commissioners minutes into the record, but noted that he was not going to turn the proceedings into "any family quarrel." He also continued the adjournment until October 1.

In response to Turner's opposition, Martini stated that he would withdraw from the petition. Martini noted that he sympathized with those who were proposed to lose property and had opposed the project. He noted that the citizens were to have been paid for their land. Martini also stated that he felt the majority of Passaic's residents still supported it, despite the vocal protests of residents. He slammed Turner as jealous and did not consider the welfare of his citizens when making the decision to oppose. Martini stated that Turner probably had a better idea and that it should be his responsibility. Turner responded that he was not opposed to a project that would benefit the citizens of his city, but stated that he felt Martini's proposal was being forced upon the municipality. Turner felt that if Martini's first decision was to withdraw from the proceedings, then there was no way he saw success.

On September 27, Martini stated that he would offer a decision on how to resolve the case at a meeting at City Hall on September 28. However, Turner insisted that he wanted the public heard and would oppose any resolution Martini offered to help resolve the case. Turner stated that he wanted the other four Commissioners to make their opinions known before proceeding. Turner wanted the meeting held at Passaic High School instead of Passaic City Hall and have a judge or other citizen who keep order in charge over the Passaic Board of Commissioners. Turner stated that he did not feel like he killed the campaign to eliminate the 13 grade crossings, but noted that he did not think the federal government was to help fund the project, questioning Schenider's estimates of being the real cost. Martini continued to blame the mayor that his objections hurt the process.

At the September 28 meeting, things continued to be heated between Turner and Martini. Martini continued to insist that Turner's action killed the project while Turner reiterated that Martini's statements were devoid of facts. Roegner stated that the best solution to the problem would be to leave it to a public vote in the November 1937 elections. Over 200 residents of the city, most from the Fourth Ward, attended the meeting at City Hall and spoke in opposition, save for Richard Wilcox of the Chamber of Commerce, who spoke in support. The Commissioners decided to have a meeting on October 4 to hear the opinions of the residents and asked Weinberger to request the hearing on October 1 be postponed so this meeting could occur. Emmett Drew did so, postponing what was expected to be the final session on the project.

At the October 4 meeting, attended by at least 800 residents of Passaic at Woodrow Wilson Junior High School, Martini offered a resolution to withdraw the elevation alternative from the project. He stated that it was ready for approval by the other Commissioners. Turner, however, felt that the people should be heard and William Vanecek, who represented the Fourth Ward Taxpayers' Association, was called on to speak. Vanecek blasted Martini personally and for his decision making on the alternative plan though Henry Whitehead attempted to calm him down and focus on the elimination case. In response, Turner forced the Commissioners to vote on Whitehead's resolution that the Board should only focus on the track elimination project. Roegner, Turner and Zabriskle Van Houten all opposed to the resolution. Vanecek's speech turned into a rant, blasting the Herald-News newspaper and the Chamber of Commerce as well. Colonel Hugh Kelly, an engineer and advisor on the plan, became upset with Vanecek's tirade because he felt that the citizen had been attacking his credentials. Kelly demanded a chance to respond to Vanecek's comments and Turner asked Vanecek if he was willing to cede the floor to Kelly, which Vanecek declined.

Turner stated that he wanted Martini to explain his actions himself, but Martini stated that he wanted Kelly to be heard first. Kelly explained each and every option for track elimination that were drawn up, four in all and the proposed funding plan. Martini reiterated that he had not spent any extra money doing the job he was requested to by the Board of Commissioners in 1935. Martini stated that he was going to withdraw his alternative from the proceedings to Vanecek and the delight of the residents who attended the hearing. Roegner reiterated that he preferred depression plans, including one proposed by Fred Childs in the Herald-News on October 4. He defended Martini's actions and stated that at some point the Erie Railroad would eliminate its train service in Passaic and uses bus instead from Paterson to New York City.

At the end of the meeting, the Commissioners voted unanimously to approve the Martini resolution to withdraw the alternative plan.

Despite the collapse of the Martini alternative, the Erie Railroad reported on October 6 it would file for another hearing with the Public Utility Commission on October 8 to get new testimony on a basic elevation project. Martini and Weinberger put up their opposition to the elevation plan. Hobart noted that he would at the hearing that Martini would officially withdraw his alternative and file their petition. The Public Utility Commissioners noted that they had not made a final decision yet, despite being in support of the alternative plan. At the hearing, the Commission stated that they would not support any decision that was opposed by the residents of Passaic, resulting in only one more decision, the question of depression. At that point all talk of elevation ended. Martini noted that the only remaining options were elevation or depression, the former of which the city opposed and the latter of which the Commissioners were opposed. Martini noted that the city was ready to rest its case and the railroad also stated that they were, making any further testimony pointless. The hearing, which was expected to be the last, was adjourned with no continuation date.

On March 4, 1938, Martini asked the commission to speed up a decision on the depression project, the only remaining alternative. The answer came on March 7, when Drew sent a communication to Weinberger noting that the Commission decided no track elimination project was moving forward. They felt that the depression project was still too expensive and the railroad still objected because of the 50 percent requirement, they agreed it was not the time to pursue the project. The decision ended a five-year campaign to have the tracks through downtown Passaic eliminated.

=== Lull years between major campaigns (1940–1946) ===
==== 1940 minor campaigns ====
1940 proved to be a crucial year for the continued attempt to eliminate the railroad tracks in downtown Passaic. On January 9, the Passaic Board of Commissioners approved a resolution to allow Martini to talk to State Senator Oscar Wilensky and the chair of the Passaic County Republican Party, Lloyd Marsh about having the state of New Jersey pay the entire cost of eliminating the tracks. Fighting some questions that this move was nothing more than a "publicity stunt", Martini stated that he continued to want to provide improvements for the residents of the city. Martini explained that he investigated laws in various states that if the state took the expense of removing tracks, the costs would be initially on the state at full cost, but the railroad would pay it back on a deal agreed to with the state. He felt that if Wilensky and Marsh could get the state to also pass similar legislation, he would be able to convince them to have the state undertake the elimination project. Martini, despite his optimism, stated that he felt it would be a "tough job", but felt there was a chance this new approach would work out. His current plan would be depression from Pennington Avenue to Monroe Street, which would also include investing in not purchasing any new property. Martini added that the Works Progress Administration would possibly be interested in help funding the project still and that 1,500 men could be put to work on this cause. The Commissioners' resolution also authorized him once again to be in charge of the full elimination campaign.

Lloyd Marsh responded to the request by Martini promptly, stating that he would only commit to this campaign, if the front in question was "united" in their decision. Marsh stated that he did not want a repeat of the collapse of the previous campaign in 1937, when the Fourth Ward residential protest occurred on Martini's plans. The politician added that he had spent time with the Governor and the Public Utility Commissioners on the previous campaign and was disheartened by the collapse of the previous campaign. Marsh stated that he was ready to go and felt that they would be determined.

Locations of Monks' proposed traffic light system activations in 1940

On January 23, the city's Police Chief, Charles Monks, informed the Commissioners that the railroad agreed to help pay for new traffic lights along Main Avenue, that would be synchronized with the 13 grade crossings. The cost of the project, $46,000, would be funded by the railroad for $20,000 if with the Passaic Commissioners agreed to budget the other $26,000. Monks requested that the city make room for this in the budget, though it was met with some concern. Whitehead stated that he felt a $33,000 in fresh sewer charges were already being forced on the taxpayers and that adding $26,000 would make things worse. However, one of his colleagues stated that by doing this now, they would save money later by re-installing the existing traffic lights elsewhere in the city for use to help prevent accidents.

Around 4:00 p.m. on February 8, a 15-year old resident of Passaic, Edward Drosz, got stuck between two freight cars parked on a siding in the city death near Pulaski Park, which crushed him. Despite a fence put up by the Erie after Turner and Martini prodded the railroad to decided to and got a Works Progress Administration grant to do so. Locals noted that they had seen various minors cutting parts off the new fence to joyride on the freight cars leaving the yard.

During this time period, the Erie Railroad also invested money and time upgrading the station's facilities, stating that the commuters and patrons had complained about the lack of modern services.

On April 2, Monks stated that he asked the Commissioners again to look at his requests for new lighting system to help eliminate accidents, but also help save money by having 11 cops have their duties changed elsewhere that were serving as grade crossing patrolmen. His decision to renew his campaign for the traffic lights were based on the fact that the lights at the intersection of Main Avenue, Broadway and Washington Place at the tracks broke down on March 31, resulting in two cops standing in the roadway. He also felt that the lights at the Main Avenue/Passaic Avenue/Passaic Street junction were also failing. Monks added that the new system would run from Aycrigg Avenue to Monroe Street and based out of three sources of power. Any train approaching Monroe Street or Aycrigg Avenue in their respective directions would result in all 13 crossings being closed at once. There would also be buttons that would clear traffic for fire equipment rushing to the east side of Passaic and for cops to operate the system themselves in an emergency. Monks reiterated that the new system would ensure that the traffic flow meant no cars would be trapped on the railroad crossings. He also blamed the Erie towermen of being lax on pedestrian vehicle safety and that this would safeguard against the crossing gates failing.

Martini's pressure on Wilensky and Marsh intensified on April 6, when Foster Babcock, a resident of Clifton, died when struck in his car was hit by an Erie train at the Lafayette Avenue crossing. Martini stated that he had been talking to Marsh and Wilensky and that he would meeting with Wilensky on April 10 and was studying the state of New York's laws on grade crossings. Martini also noted that Marsh was willing to come together with a special legislative committee to discuss Martini's proposals.

By May 19, Martini had his information on what the state of New York would do in a similar situation. The Commissioner stated that the railroads in New York were given 50% of the cost, but would only pay in the state in return after the government did the work with 100% of the original costs. With this information, Martini again pressured Wilensky to step up on creating similar legislation in New Jersey to help Passaic out, reiterating that he feared it would take a deadly disaster to get stuff done. Martini noted that New Jersey's laws of the time only allowed $2 million to be spent on grade crossing work throughout the state. He felt that if the Utility Board was given power to completely focus on the Passaic crossings for three years, that the job would be done. Martini continued to note his regret for the failures of his 1938 plans on elevating via different route.

Martini secured a small victory in his efforts to rid Passaic of grade crossings on September 17. An ongoing negotiation with the New York, Susquehanna and Western Railroad (a former Erie subsidiary) over a year, resulted in success for the elimination of the local rail yard and most of the tracks in Passaic. This would take out a trestle across the Dundee Canal, which was to be filled in, three grade crossings (Jefferson, Monroe and Hudson Streets), abandon Yellowdale Yard and widen First Street. The Susquehanna tracks would be alongside the Erie's to the east of First Street and blocked by a fence from the Dundee Canal Parkway, then-under construction. In order to do this it would cost $1.2 million of federal and city budget to have the entire project done, turning the yard into a public square and public park, if the Susquehanna was willing to sell the yard. Martini and the Susquehanna signed their agreement on December 31, 1940, including abandonment of Yellowdale Yard.

==== War suspension (1941–1942) ====
However, progress on the Erie tracks in Passaic stalled once again until November 1941, when Martini told the press that he would tell the Commissioners yet again of his hope to get the project started and done. Martini noted that the Public Works Reserve, a new federal agency, was about to release funds for more public works projects. Reiterating his earlier research and statistics about how this would occur, Martini stated that he had discussed this project with representatives from the federal government.

On November 17, 1941, Martini spoke to the Public Utility Commission about being included in the Public Works Reserve project list. Martini stated that he wanted the commission's approval to do so, since projects were being submitted without commitment already. Martini stated that he also wanted a project on replacing the sewers in the Second Ward to be done, but felt that the grade crossing project should be declared the highest priority project in the entire state.

The next day, Martini also spoke down a complaint by a local resident, James Ryan, who was concerned that Martini would return to his elevated project from 1938. Ryan, voicing the concerns on health and privacy for residents, along with property value decreases, wanted to make sure it was depression or nothing. Martini stated that the plan was for depression and no elevation would be considered.

However, the outbreak of World War II resulted in the postponement of progress on eliminating the grade crossings in Passaic. On May 1, 1942, the Herald-News reported that confidential sources told the author, Ed Reardon, that the project had gone into hibernation, with the expectation that the process would renew at the end of the war. Martini backed up Reardon's sources when he talked to the press on May 22. Martini stated that he would talk to his Commissioners colleagues on May 26 about the idea of projects that the city should focus on after the war, when there would be unemployed people. This would include the grade crossing project along with opening a new highway parallel East Main Avenue to help reduce traffic in the city and the then-unfinished Dundee Canal project. Martini felt that the project would help get people employed for a stretch of five to seven years.

However, at the May 26 meeting, things came to a head, this time between Martini and Planning Commissioner John J. Baldino. Baldino found issues when the Commissioners agreed to pass a resolution to put Martini's plan into action without doing much research. The Commissioners, led by Mayor Thomas Kennedy, stated that the resolution was to only set up a plan for post-war efforts if employment fell and that they were not trying to stiff the Planning Board. Baldino disagreed with Kennedy, who stated that the projects may never occur, mentioning that plans could still end up in Washington. Baldino asked that if the Planning Board was not being considered for major projects that they should disband the Board.

Martini intervened in the arguing, feeling that the Passaic Engineering Department was in charge of the Works Progress Administration projects and did not need extra money for experts in engineering and architecture to determine their process, something Blandino disagreed with. Martini then accused Baldino of wanting to be involved in this project because he was an architect. Baldino denied that was the reason, reminding the Commissioner that Martini's father-in-law was also an architect. Martini's only response to declare that his father-in-law was a resident of Clifton and question if Baldino had been allowed to represent the Planning Board as the chairman was at a convention in Indianapolis, Indiana.

Irving Rinzler, the secretary of the Planning Board, noted that there had not been a meeting of the Board in four weeks and that Baldino was not given the authority to speak for the Board. Rinzler told the Board of Commissioners that the group had never discussed Martini's plans and stated that he supported the resolution for a post-war program. Martini reiterated what Kennedy had, that the city would not be obligated to do anything and was just a program of ideas for the city to work on after the war because of a request from the Public Works Reserve for projects.

== Bibliography ==
- Erie Railroad (1913). Eighteenth Annual Report of the Board of Directors of the Erie Railroad Company to the Bond and Share Holders Fiscal Year Ending June 30, 1913. New York, New York: Erie Railroad.
- Hall, Henry (1896). America's Successful Men of Affairs: The United States at Large. New York, New York: The New York Tribune.
- Kip, Frederic Ellsworth (1928). History of the Kip Family in America. Boston, Massachusetts: Hudson Publishing Company.
- Lucas, Walter Arndt (1944). From the Hills to the Hudson: A History of the Paterson and Hudson River Rail Road and its Associates, the Paterson and Ramapo, and the Union Railroads. New York, New York: The Cornwall Press. hdl:2027/uc1.b4536228.
- Moore, Thomas Morrell (1895). Charter and Ordinances With References to Certain Laws Affecting the City of Passaic, in Force July 1st, 1895. Trenton, New Jersey: John L. Murphy Publishing Company.
- Nelson, William; Shriner, Charles Anthony (1920). History of Paterson and Its Environs. New York, New York: Lewis Historical Publishing Company.
- Pape, William Jamieson; Scott, William Winfield (1899). The News' History of Passaic. Passaic, New Jersey: Newspaper Publishing Company.
