= Wortendyke =

Wortendyke may refer to:

- Wortendyke, New Jersey, United States, an unincorporated community in Midland Park, New Jersey
- Wortendyke (NYS&W station), Midland Park, New Jersey
- Wortendyke Barn, a historic barn in Park Ridge, New Jersey
- Frederick Wortendyke House (Park Ridge, New Jersey), a historic house
- Frederick Wortendyke House (Woodcliff Lake, New Jersey), a historic house
- Wortendyke-Demund House, a historic house in Midland Park, New Jersey

== People with the surname ==
- Jacob R. Wortendyke (1818–1880), American politician
- Reynier Jacob Wortendyke, Jr. (1895–1975), American judge
