= Bergen-Passaic Scholastic League =

Defunct high school athletic conference

The Bergen-Passaic Scholastic League, abbreviated BPSL, was an athletic conference comprising thirteen private and public high schools located in Bergen County and Passaic County, New Jersey, United States. The conference ceased to exist following the 2009–10 school year and joined most of the schools from the Bergen County Scholastic League to form the North Jersey Interscholastic Conference. The only school that did not join was Paterson Catholic High School, as the school closed following the 2009–10 year.

== Schools ==
School	Location	School District	Team Name	Colors	Classification	Division
Eastern Christian High School	North Haledon		Eagles	Blue/Gold	North Jersey, Parochial B	Carpenter
Elmwood Park Memorial High School	Elmwood Park	Elmwood Park Public Schools	Crusaders	Scarlet/White	North 1, Group I	King
Garfield High School	Garfield	Garfield Public Schools	Boilermakers	Purple/Gold	North 1, Group III	King
Glen Rock High School	Glen Rock	Glen Rock Public Schools	Panthers	Red/White/Black	North 1, Group II	King
Hawthorne High School	Hawthorne	Hawthorne Public Schools	Bears	Royal Blue/White	North 1, Group II	King
Immaculate Conception High School	Lodi		Blue Wolves	Blue/White	North Jersey, Parochial B	Carpenter
Lodi High School	Lodi	Lodi Public Schools	Rams	Royal/Orange	North 1, Group II	King
Manchester Regional High School	Haledon	Manchester Regional High School	Falcons	Red/White/Black	North 1, Group II	King
Midland Park High School	Midland Park	Midland Park School District	Panthers	Green/White	North 1, Group I	Carpenter
Paterson Catholic High School	Paterson		Cougars	Maroon/Gold	North Jersey, Parochial B	Carpenter
Pompton Lakes High School	Pompton Lakes	Pompton Lakes School District	Cardinals	Red/White	North 1, Group I	Carpenter
Saddle Brook High School	Saddle Brook	Saddle Brook Public Schools	Falcons	Blue/White/Gold	North 1, Group I	Carpenter
Waldwick High School	Waldwick	Waldwick Public School District	Warriors	Navy Blue/White	North 1, Group I	Carpenter

== League sports ==
The Bergen-Passaic Scholastic League allowed member schools to compete in many sports spread out among three seasons. Although the league did not have a cheerleading division, many member schools had their own cheerleading teams. Other sports, such as fencing, are offered by some schools, but like cheerleading, were not part of the BPSL.

The following is a list of the sports that BPSL offered. Some sports did not have a team from every school.

=== Fall sports ===
- Cross Country (Boys)
- Cross Country (Girls)
- Field Hockey
- Football – Note: Pascack Hills from the NBIL competed in football only in the B-PSL.
- Soccer (B)
- Soccer (G)
- Tennis (G)
- Volleyball (G)

=== Winter sports ===
- Basketball (B)
- Basketball (G)
- Bowling
- Swimming
- Winter Track
- Wrestling

=== Spring sports ===
- Baseball
- Golf
- Lacrosse
- Softball
- Tennis (B)
- Track & Field (B)
- Track & Field (G)
- Volleyball (B)
