= Midland Park School District =

School district in Bergen County, New Jersey, US

Address
- 250 Prospect Street Midland Park, Bergen County, New Jersey, 07432; United States
- Coordinates: 41.0003°N 74.1370°W

District information
- Grades: PreK-12
- Superintendent: Kevin Ulmer
- Business administrator: Stacy C. Garvey
- Schools: 3

Students and staff
- Enrollment: 897 (as of 2023–24)
- Faculty: 106.7 FTEs
- Student–teacher ratio: 8.4:1

Other information
- District Factor Group: GH
- Website: www.mpsnj.org
Ind.	Per pupil	District spending	Rank (*)	K-12 average	%± vs. average
1A	Total Spending	$20,426	39	$18,891	8.1%
1	Budgetary Cost	15,611	36	14,783	5.6%
2	Classroom Instruction	8,806	33	8,763	0.5%
6	Support Services	2,611	39	2,392	9.2%
8	Administrative Cost	1,983	48	1,485	33.5%
10	Operations & Maintenance	1,603	26	1,783	−10.1%
13	Extracurricular Activities	566	38	268	111.2%
16	Median Teacher Salary	52,900	6	64,043
Data from NJDoE 2014 Taxpayers' Guide to Education Spending. *Of K-12 districts with up to 1,800 students. Lowest spending=1; Highest=49

The Midland Park School District is a comprehensive community public school district serving students in pre-kindergarten through twelfth grade from Midland Park, in Bergen County, in the U.S. state of New Jersey.

As of the 2023–24 school year, the district, comprised of three schools, had an enrollment of 897 students and 106.7 classroom teachers (on an FTE basis), for a student–teacher ratio of 8.4:1.

== History ==
Students from Midland Park had attended Ridgewood High School until 1935, after which they started attending Pompton Lakes High School. Due to limitations on space, the Pompton Lakes School District mandated that the district's high school could not accommodate students from Midland Park after the end of the 1956–57 school year. Midland Park's voters approved a referendum in 1955 that led to the construction of a high school costing $1.4 million (equivalent to $15.7 million in 2024) that opened in September 1957 on a site covering 22 acres (8.9 ha).

The district had been classified by the New Jersey Department of Education as being in District Factor Group "GH", the third-highest of eight groupings. District Factor Groups organize districts statewide to allow comparison by common socioeconomic characteristics of the local districts. From lowest socioeconomic status to highest, the categories are A, B, CD, DE, FG, GH, I and J.

== Awards and recognition ==
For the 2000-01 school year, Highland-Godwin Elementary School was named a "Star School" by the New Jersey Department of Education, the highest honor that a New Jersey school can achieve.

== Schools ==
Schools in the district (with 2023–24 enrollment data from the National Center for Education Statistics) are:

- Godwin Elementary School with 239 students in grades PreK–2
  - Danielle Bache, principal
- Highland Elementary School with 283 students in grades 3–6
  - Andrew Bianco, principal
- Midland Park High School with 347 students in grades 7–12
  - Nicholas Capuano, principal

== Administration ==
Core members of the district's administration are:

- Kevin Ulmer, superintendent
- Stacy C. Garvey, business administrator and board secretary

== Board of education ==
The district's board of education, comprised of nine members, sets policy and oversees the fiscal and educational operation of the district through its administration. As a Type II school district, the board's trustees are elected directly by voters to serve three-year terms of office on a staggered basis, with two seats up for election each year held (since 2015) as part of the November general election. The board appoints a superintendent to oversee the district's day-to-day operations and a business administrator to supervise the business functions of the district.
