= Watervliet Arsenal =

US Army arsenal in Watervliet, New York

Watervliet Arsenal (WVA)
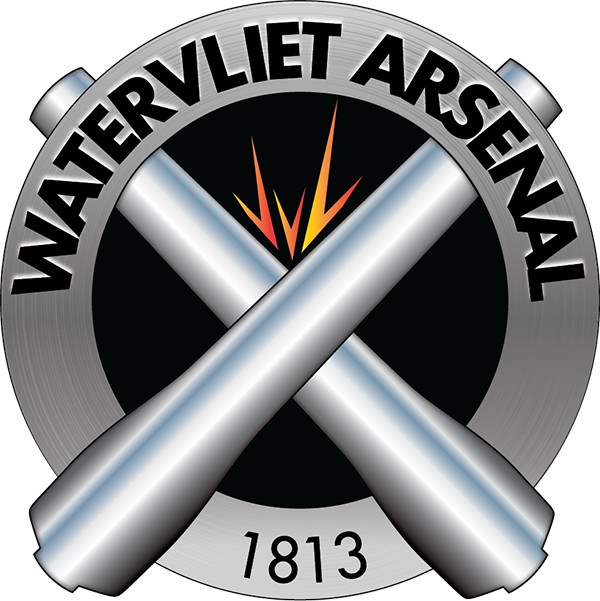
- Active: July 14, 1813 - Present
- Country: United States
- Branch: U.S. Army
- Type: Arsenal
- Role: Manufacturer of large caliber cannon, howitzer and mortar systems
- Part of: U.S. Army Materiel Command, U.S. Army Tank-automotive and Armaments Command
- Website: https://www.wva.army.mil

Commanders
- Current commander: Col. Danilo A. Green

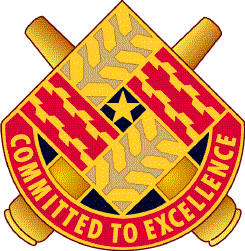
TACOM distinctive unit insignia

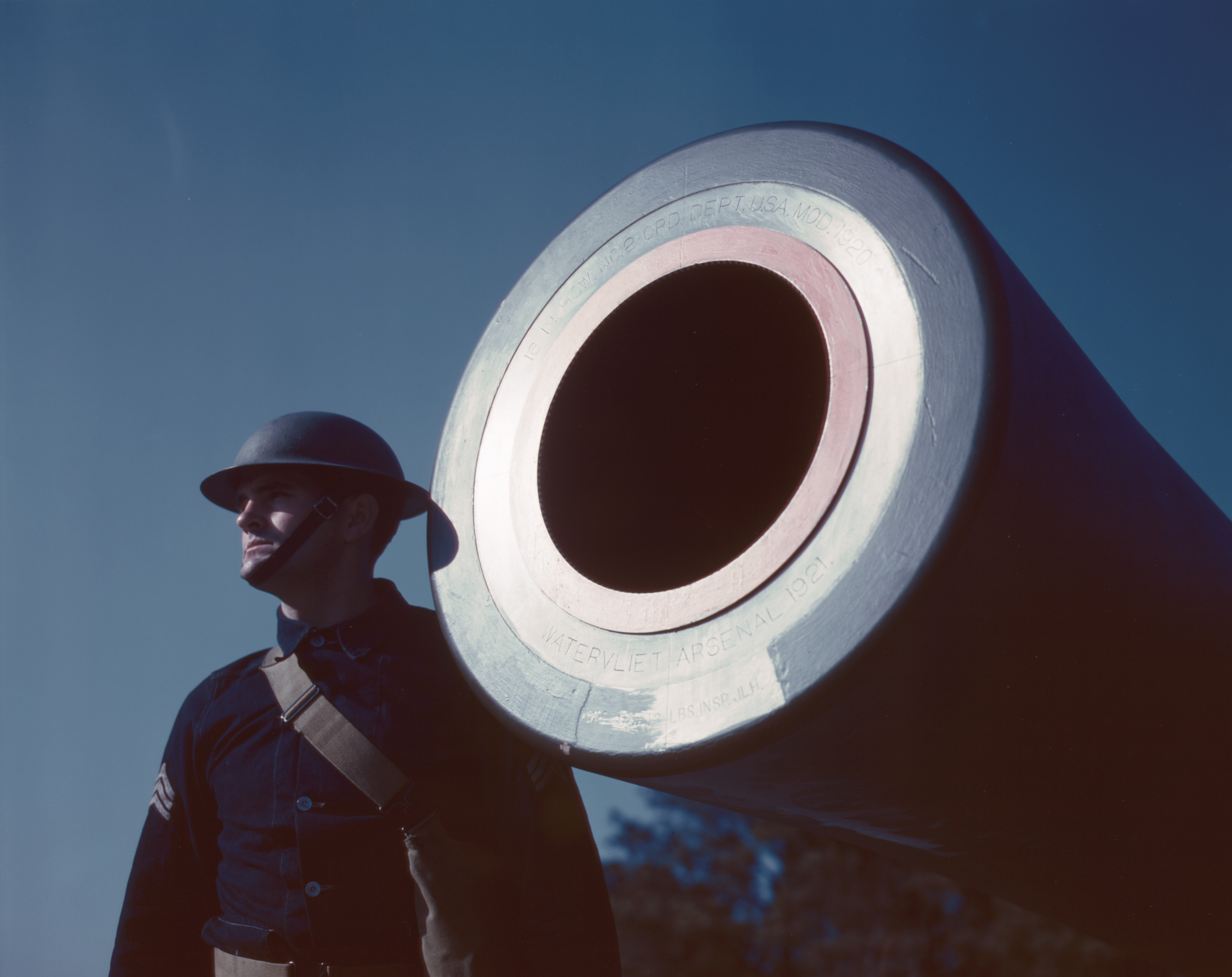
A 16-inch M1920 coast artillery howitzer, stamped Watervliet Arsenal, 1921

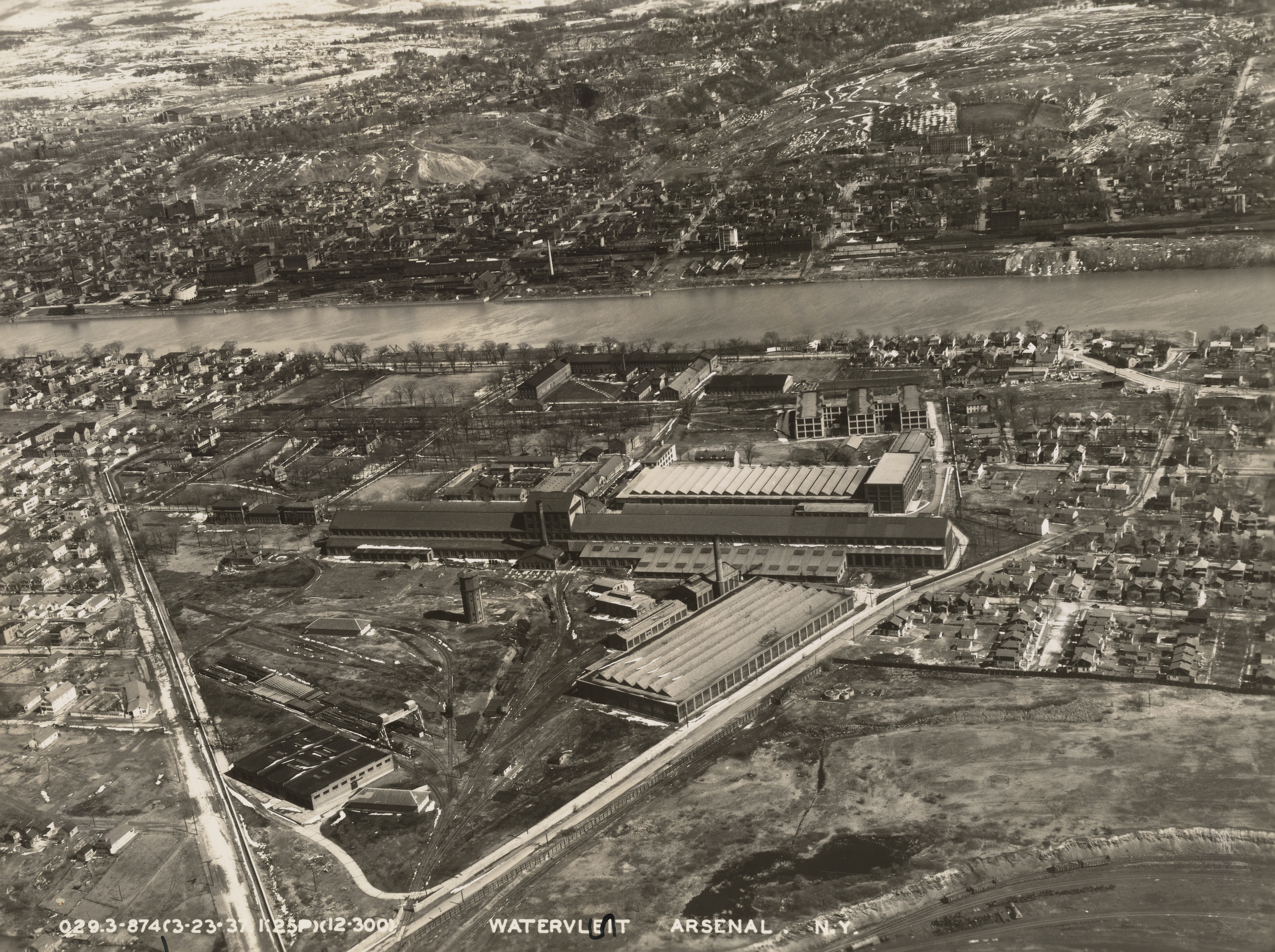
Aerial view of the arsenal in 1937

The Watervliet Arsenal (WVA) /ˈwɔːtərvliːt/ is an arsenal of the United States Army located in Watervliet, New York, on the west bank of the Hudson River. It is the oldest continuously active arsenal in the United States, and today produces much of the artillery for the army, as well as gun tubes for cannons, mortars, and tanks. It has been a National Historic Landmark (NHL) since 1966.

Watervliet Arsenal falls under its headquarters, the U.S. Army Tank-automotive and Armaments Command under the U.S. Army Materiel Command.

The arsenal was founded on July 14, 1813, to support the War of 1812. It was designated as the Watervliet Arsenal in 1817. It occupies 142 acres (57 ha) of land, approximately 8 miles (13 km) north of Albany, New York. The location is adjacent to the Hudson River. The site contains manufacturing, administrative offices and storage areas. It houses the Army's Combat Capabilities Development Command Benét Laboratories, which does product development, improvement, research, and testing for all artillery related engineering.

== Introduction ==
WVA supports the U.S. Army’s fighting force with direct fire tank guns, indirect fire artillery cannons, mortars and components, sustainment parts, and spares for all weapon systems produced at WVA.

== Tenant activities ==
The Arsenal has the historic Iron Building, which served as the home of the Watervliet Arsenal Museum. The museum was closed in October 2013 for security reasons.

Recruiting Station Albany, the headquarters of a United States Marine Corps recruiting station, is located on the Arsenal.

- Watervliet Arsenal
- U.S. National Register of Historic Places
- U.S. National Historic Landmark
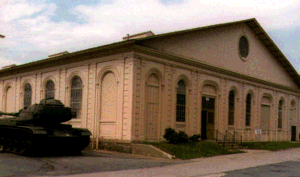
- Historic Iron Building

- Location within New York Location within the United States
- Interactive map showing the location for Watervliet Arsenal
- Location: Broadway; Watervliet, New York
- Coordinates: 42°43′06″N 73°42′31″W
- Area: 142 acres (57 ha)
- NRHP reference No.: 66000503

Significant dates
- Added to NRHP: November 13, 1966
- Designated NHL: November 13, 1966

In February 2009, the headquarters of the United States Army Recruiting Battalion Albany relocated to Watervliet Arsenal from its old location on Wolf Road.

== History ==
=== 1813–1823 ===
The arsenal was chosen to be built at the edge of the village of Gibbonsville, directly opposite Troy, New York. It was chosen to be built there due to its key location on the Hudson River, only 60 miles (97 km) from Lake Champlain, 140 miles (230 km) from New York City, and a short distance via the Mohawk River to Lake Ontario. During the early stages of the War of 1812, attacks could be expected from many key ports and other locations.

At the time, the Colonel of Ordnance was Decius Wadsworth. He designated the arsenal to produce fixed ammunition and small articles of equipment including gun carriages, drag ropes, ladles, wormers, sponges, and shot. The original plot of land acquired by the Department of Ordnance was 12 acres (49,000 m^{2}). Construction began in the summer of 1813 on fourteen buildings: south and north gun houses, a brick arsenal, two stables, a guard house, commanding officer's quarters, a woodshed, two enlisted men's quarters, a hospital and one office. The cost for the land was US$2,585.

=== 1880s ===
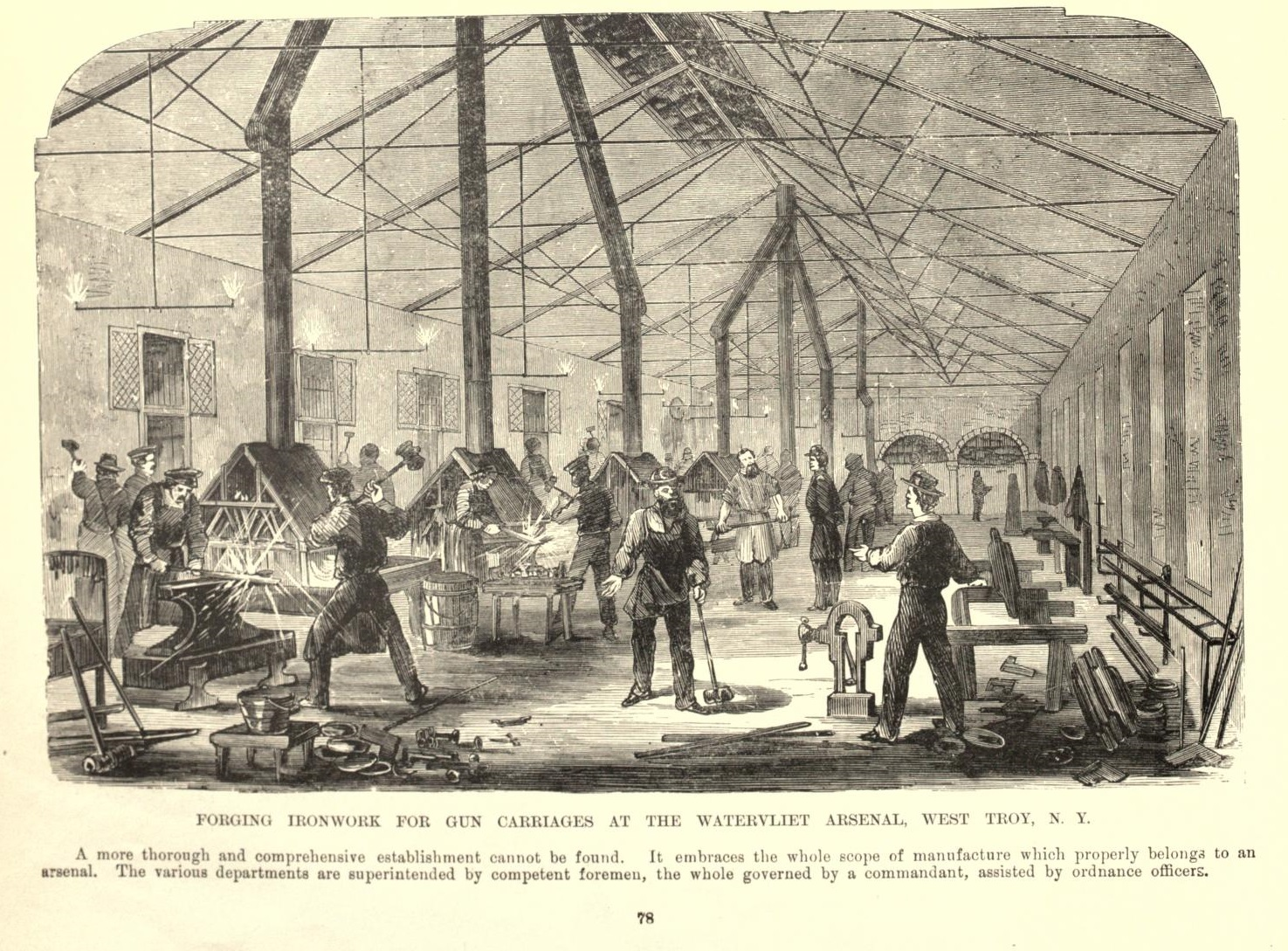
Woodcut titled "Forging Ironwork for Gun Carriages at the Watervliet Arsenal, West Troy, N.Y." in Frank Leslie's Illustrated Newspaper, circa 1895

Nearly 70 years after the arsenal produced its first products, it gained national prominence when it became the Army's first large caliber cannon manufacturer in the late 1880s. During this period, production changed from the manufacturing of saddles and gun carriages to cannons. Remnants of this period are still in operation today, via the continued use of historic Building 110, "The Big Gun Shop," for manufacturing missions. This gun shop once produced 16-inch guns and many other weapons for the United States Army Coast Artillery Corps.

=== 1970s-present ===
A considerable turning point in the modernization of Watervliet Arsenal was the construction of the radial forge in the 1970s, a $7 million dollar expenditure.

As of 2023 Watervliet Arsenal is manufacturing cannon barrels for the M1 Abrams tank.

Watervliet Arsenal released plans to replace the iconic rotary forge on June 23, 2023 as part of its modernization plan under the U.S. Army Materiel Command's planned modernization of the U.S. Army's organic industrial base. Additionally, Watervliet Arsenal plans on replacing its paint booth with a BlastOne Automated Paint Booth that will expand capacity and capabilities. These are part of an ongoing $1.7 billion program to upgrade the arsenal. On July 31, 2023, U.S. Senate Majority Leader Sen. Chuck Schumer announced that the $1.7 billion would be allocated by the U.S. Congress and U.S. Army.

== Commanding officers ==
| No. | Portrait | Name (rank shown highest while in command) | Dates of Command |
|---|---|---|---|
| - | No image available | Cpt. Thomas L. Campbell | Interim Commander July 14, 1813 – 1816 |
| 1 | No image available | Maj. James Daliba | November 14, 1816 – May 1, 1824 |
| 2 | Lt. Col. George Talcott | Lt. Col. George Talcott | September 1, 1824 – January 25, 1835 |
| 3 | Lt. Col. William J. Worth | Lt. Col. William J. Worth | January 26, 1835 – April 30, 1838 |
| 4 | Lt. Col. Rufus L. Baker | Col. Rufus L. Baker | October 10, 1838 – October 10, 1851 |
| 5 | Maj. John Symington | Maj. John Symington | October 10, 1851 – June 23, 1857 |
| 6 | Maj. Alfred Mordecai | Maj. Alfred Mordecai | June 23, 1857 – May 14, 1861 |
| 7 | Col. William A. Thornton | Col. William A. Thornton | May 15, 1861 – December 25, 1863 |
| 8 | | Brig. Gen. Peter V. Hagner | December 25, 1863 – December 3, 1880 |
| 9 | Lt. Col. A. R. Buffington | Lt. Col. A. R. Buffington | December 3, 1880 – November 2, 1881 |
| 10 | Col. Alfred Mordecai, Jr. | Col. Alfred Mordecai Jr. | November 2, 1881 – May 12, 1886 |
| 11 | Col. James M. Whittemore | Col. James M. Whittemore | June 5, 1886 – November 11, 1889 |
| 12 | Lt. Col. Francis H. Parker | Lt. Col. Francis H. Parker | November 21, 1889 – December 12, 1892 |
| 13 | Lt. Col. Isaac Arnold | Lt. Col. Isaac Arnold | December 19, 1892 – February 14, 1898 |
| 14 | Col. Alfred Mordecai Jr. | Col. Alfred Mordechai Jr. | February 23, 1898 – May 8, 1899 |
| 15 | Col. Joseph P. Farley | Col. Joseph P. Farley | May 26, 1899 – February 17, 1903 |
| 16 | Lt. Col. Charles Schaler | Lt. Col. Charles Shaler | February 18, 1903 – July 13, 1903 |
| 17 | Col. Daniel M. Taylor | Col. Daniel M. Taylor | July 14, 1903 – March 31, 1905 |
| 18 | Lt. Col. Ira MacNutt | Lt. Col. Ira MacNutt | May 1, 1905 – January 7, 1908 |
| 19 | Col. William W. Gibson | Col. William W. Gibson | January 20, 1908 – February 17, 1918 |
| 20 | Col. John E. Munroe | Col. John E. Munroe | March 1, 1918 – September 3, 1918 |
| 21 | Col. Charles G. Mettler | Col. Charles G. Mettler | September 3, 1918 – March 10, 1919 |
| 22 | Col. J. Walker Benet | Col. J. Walker Benet | March 11, 1919 – May 28, 1921 |
| 23 | Lt. Col. William I. Westervelt | Lt. Col. William I. Westervelt | May 31, 1921 – September 1, 1923 |
| 24 | Col. Edwin D. Bricker | Col. Edwin D. Bricker | October 1, 1923 – July 30, 1929 |
| 25 | Col. Herman W. Schull | Col. Herman W. Schull | September 9, 1929 – February 27, 1932 |
| 26 | Maj. Charles A. Schimelfenig | Maj. Charles A. Schimelfenig | February 28, 1932 – July 31, 1932 |
| 27 | Col. Gilbert H. Stewart | Col. Gilbert H. Stewart | August 1, 1932 – September 12, 1938 |
| 28 | Col. Richard H. Somers | Col. Richard H. Somers | November 14, 1938 – July 17, 1940 |
| 29 | Brig. Gen. A. G. Gillespie | Brig. Gen. A. G. Gillespie | July 19, 1940 – March 31, 1945 |
| 30 | Col. Clarence E. Partridge | Col. Clarence E. Partridge | April 1, 1945 – April 30, 1946 |
| 31 | Col. John C. Raaen | Col. John C. Raaen | May 1, 1946 – September 2, 1947 |
| 32 | Col. Harry N. Rising | Col. Harry N. Rising | September 4, 1947 – August 15, 1952 |
| 33 | Col. Richard Z. Crane | Col. Richard Z. Crane | September 1, 1952 – August 31, 1954 |
| 34 | Col. Elmo S. Matthews | Col. Elmo S. Matthews | September 20, 1954 – June 30, 1958 |
| 35 | Col. Walter M. Tisdale | Col. Walter M. Tisdale | August 13, 1958 – January 31, 1962 |
| 36 | | Col. Keith T. O'Keefe | February 1, 1962 – July 31, 1965 |
| 37 | Col. Fred Kornet, Jr. | Col. Fred Kornet Jr. | August 1, 1965 – September 14, 1967 |
| 38 | Col. Arthur H. Sweeny, Jr. | Col. Arthur H. Sweeny Jr. | November 1967 – August 19, 1968 |
| 39 | Col. William Mulheron, Jr. | Col. William Mulheron Jr. | December 20, 1968 – June 30, 1971 |
| 40 | Col. Christopher S. Maggio | Col. Christopher S. Maggio | July 15, 1971 – August 31, 1973 |
| 41 | Col. Richard H. Sawyer | Col. Richard H. Sawyer | September 9, 1973 – July 24, 1975 |
| 42 | Col. Malcolm V. Meekison | Col. Malcolm V. Meekison | July 25, 1975 – August 29, 1976 |
| 43 | Col. Church M. Matthew, Jr. | Col. Church M. Matthews Jr. | September 21, 1976 – September 8, 1978 |
| 44 | Col. Robert W. Pointer | Col. Robert W. Pointer Jr. | September 8, 1978 – July 14, 1980 |
| 45 | Col. Gerald R. Wetzel | Col. Gerald R. Wetzel | July 14, 1980 – July 19, 1983 |
| 46 | Col. Edward V. Karl | Col. Edward V. Karl | July 19, 1983 – January 22, 1986 |
| 47 | Col. Robert T. Walker | Col. Robert T. Walker | January 22, 1986 – July 14, 1988 |
| 48 | Col. Joseph H. Mayton, Jr. | Col. Joseph H. Mayton Jr. | July 14, 1988 – July 19, 1990 |
| 49 | Col. Michael J. Neuman | Col. Michael J. Neuman | July 19, 1990 – March 20, 1992 |
| 50 | Col. Bernard P. Thomas | Col. Bernard P. Thomas | March 20, 1992 – March 31, 1994 |
| 51 | Col. John R. Hostettler | Col. John R. Hostettler | March 31, 1994 – May 22, 1996 |
| 52 | Col. John C. Rickman | Col. John C. Rickman | May 22, 1996 – July 9, 1998 |
| 53 | Col. Gene E. King | Col. Gene E. King | July 9, 1998 – July 11, 2000 |
| 54 | Col. John R. Cook | Col. John R. Cook | July 11, 2000 – July 11, 2002 |
| 55 | Col. Donald C. Olson | Col. Donald C. Olson | July 11, 2002 – July 29, 2005 |
| 56 | Col Kevin R. Moore | Col. Kevin R. Moore | July 29, 2005 – July 11, 2008 |
| 57 | Col. Scott Fletcher | Col. Scott Fletcher | July 11, 2008 – July 9, 2010 |
| 58 | Col. Mark F. Migaleddi | Col. Mark F. Migaleddi | July 9, 2010 – July 18, 2013 |
| 59 | Col. Lee H. Schiller, Jr. | Col. Lee H. Schiller Jr. | July 18, 2013 – July 28, 2016 |
| 60 | Col. Joseph R. Morrow | Col. Joseph R. Morrow | July 28, 2016 – July 24, 2018 |
| 61 | Col. Milton G. Kelly | Col. Milton G. Kelly | August 21, 2018 – July 21, 2020 |
| 62 | Col. Earl B. Schonberg, Jr. | Col. Earl B. Schonberg Jr. | July 21, 2020 – July 22, 2022 |
| 63 | Col. Alain G. Fisher | Col. Alain G. Fisher | July 22, 2022 – July 25, 2024 |
| 64 | Col. Jason W. Schultz, PhD | Col. Jason W. Schultz, PhD | July 25, 2024 – July 23, 2026 |
| 65 | Col. Danilo A. Green | Col. Danilo A. Green | July 23, 2026 – Present |

== See also ==
- List of National Historic Landmarks in New York
- National Register of Historic Places listings in Albany County, New York
