= Frederick Wortendyke House =

Frederick Wortendyke House may refer to:

- Frederick Wortendyke House (Park Ridge, New Jersey), listed on the National Register of Historic Places in Bergen County, New Jersey
- Frederick Wortendyke House (Woodcliff Lake, New Jersey), listed on the National Register of Historic Places in Bergen County, New Jersey
