= Yennie =

Yennie is a surname. Notable people with the surname include:

- Ashlynn Yennie (born 1985), American actress
- Donald R. Yennie (1924–1993), American physicist
