= Thomas Appelquist =

American theoretical particle physicist

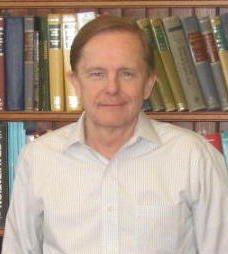
Thomas Appelquist, Eugene Higgins Professor of Physics, Yale University

Thomas William Appelquist (born 1941) is an American theoretical particle physicist who is the Eugene Higgins Professor of Physics Emeritus at Yale University.

== Education and career ==
Appelquist was born in Emmetsburg, Iowa and grew up in Indiana. He received his bachelor's degree from Illinois Benedictine College and his Ph.D. in 1968 from Cornell University under Donald R. Yennie with thesis Parametric Representations of Renormalized Feynman Amplitudes. Following a postdoctoral appointment at the Stanford Linear Accelerator Center, he joined the faculty at Harvard University in 1970, where he collaborated with H. David Politzer on charmonium. In 1975, he moved to Yale and was appointed professor of physics in 1976.

At Yale, he served as chair of the Department of Physics (1983–1989), director of the division of physical sciences and engineering (1990–1993), and dean of the Graduate School (1993–1998). In 1991, he was named Eugene Higgins Professor of Physics.

== Research ==
=== Charmonium ===
In 1974, Appelquist and Politzer predicted the existence of narrow bound states of a charm quark and charm antiquark, which they named "charmonium" by analogy with positronium. They argued that asymptotic freedom renders the strong force between heavy quarks Coulomb-like at the relevant distance scales, leading to a positronium-like spectrum with narrow widths. Their paper was in preparation when the J/ψ was discovered in November 1974 at Brookhaven and SLAC. With Alvaro de Rújula, Politzer, and Sheldon Glashow, Appelquist subsequently predicted the P-wave charmonium states observed in radiative decays of the ψ'.

=== Decoupling theorem ===
With James Carazzone, Appelquist proved the decoupling theorem in quantum field theory, showing that in a renormalizable theory the effects of heavy particles on low-energy physics are suppressed by inverse powers of the heavy mass and can be absorbed into renormalized parameters of the low-energy theory. The Appelquist–Carazzone decoupling theorem is a foundational result in the effective field theory approach to particle physics.

=== Beyond the Standard Model ===
Appelquist has made several influential contributions to physics beyond the Standard Model. With collaborators, he developed the electroweak chiral Lagrangian framework for parametrizing deviations from the Standard Model in the symmetry-breaking sector. He proposed walking technicolor theories, in which the gauge coupling evolves slowly ("walks") over a wide range of energy scales, addressing phenomenological challenges of earlier technicolor models.

With Hsin-Chia Cheng and Bogdan Dobrescu, he introduced the concept of universal extra dimensions, in which all Standard Model fields propagate in compact extra dimensions, leading to a distinctive spectrum of Kaluza–Klein excitations and a natural dark matter candidate.

=== Lattice strong dynamics ===
Appelquist is a founding member of the Lattice Strong Dynamics (LSD) Collaboration, which uses lattice gauge theory simulations to study strongly coupled gauge theories relevant to electroweak symmetry breaking and composite dark matter. His recent work has focused on effective field theories with approximate conformal symmetry and an associated dilaton, motivated by lattice studies of near-conformal gauge theories.

== Honors and service ==
He is a Fellow of the American Physical Society (elected 1984), a Fellow of the American Academy of Arts and Sciences (elected 1993), and the recipient of a Senior U.S. Scientist Award from the Alexander von Humboldt Foundation. In 1997, he was awarded the J. J. Sakurai Prize for Theoretical Particle Physics of the American Physical Society for his work on charmonium and the decoupling of heavy particles.

He served as President (1993–1996) and Chair of the Board (2001–2006) of the Aspen Center for Physics. He was a member of the Scientific Policy Committee of the Superconducting Super Collider Laboratory (1989–1993) and chaired the Science Council of Jefferson National Laboratory (2007–2017). He chaired the National Research Council committee that produced the survey Physics in a New Era (1999–2001). He has served on advisory committees for the National Science Foundation, the Department of Energy, and the American Physical Society. At Yale, he served on the faculty/trustee Presidential Search Committee during the 1992–1993 academic year.
