= Hiroshi Suura =

Japanese theoretical physicist

Hiroshi Suura (born August 19, 1925, Hiroshima, Japan – September 15, 1998) was a Japanese theoretical physicist, specializing in particle physics.

== Education and career ==
Suura graduated in 1947 with a B.S. from the University of Tokyo and in 1954 with a Ph.D. in physics from Hiroshima University. From September 1955 to June 1956 he did research at the Institute for Advanced Study. From 1960 to 1965 he was a professor at Nihon University. From 1965 until his retirement as professor emeritus, he was a professor at the University of Minnesota.

In the theory of infrared corrections, Suura made important contributions, essential for many precise measurements involving elementary particles, especially electrons.

... another theme running through Hiroshi’s work and connecting it to the major issues of today’s particle physics is the idea of “particles in loops.” One of his most-quoted results concerns the effect of electron loops in the calculation of the muon’s anomalous magnetic moment a_{μ} ... This leads to a difference between a_{μ} and the corresponding quantity a_{e} for the electron, which was confirmed in beautiful experiments at CERN ... and is still the subject of intense scrutiny ...

He was elected in 1967 a Fellow of the American Physical Society. On June 1, 1994, the University of Minnesota held a colloquium in honor of Hiroshi Suura. After his death, the Physical Society of Japan published a collection of articles as a memorial to him.

== Selected publications ==
- Suura, Hiroshi (1954). "On a Treatment of Many-particle Systems in Quantum Field Theory". Progress of Theoretical Physics. 12 (1): 49–71. Bibcode:1954PThPh..12...49S. doi:10.1143/PTP.12.49.
- Suura, Hiroshi (1955). "Radiative Correction to High-Energy Electron Scattering". Physical Review. 99 (3): 1020–1028. Bibcode:1955PhRv...99.1020S. doi:10.1103/PhysRev.99.1020.
- Yennie, D. R.; Suura, H. (1957). "Higher Order Radiative Corrections to Electron Scattering". Physical Review. 105 (4): 1378–1382. Bibcode:1957PhRv..105.1378Y. doi:10.1103/PhysRev.105.1378.
- Suura, Hiroshi; Wichmann, Eyvind H. (1957). "Magnetic Moment of the Mu Meson". Physical Review. 105 (6): 1930–1931. Bibcode:1957PhRv..105.1930S. doi:10.1103/PhysRev.105.1930.
- Yennie, D.R; Frautschi, S.C; Suura, H. (1961). "The infrared divergence phenomena and high-energy processes". Annals of Physics. 13 (3): 379–452. Bibcode:1961AnPhy..13..379Y. doi:10.1016/0003-4916(61)90151-8. (over 1900 citations)
- Suura, H.; Simmons, L. M. (1966). "Dispersion Relation for the Axial-Vector Vertex and a Sum Rule for the Axial-Vector Coupling-Constant Renormalization". Physical Review. 148 (4): 1579–1582. Bibcode:1966PhRv..148.1579S. doi:10.1103/PhysRev.148.1579.
- Meyer, James W.; Suura, H. (1967). "Equal-Time Commutation Relations of the Isovector Current Densities". Physical Review. 160 (5): 1366–1374. Bibcode:1967PhRv..160.1366M. doi:10.1103/PhysRev.160.1366.
- Johnson, K.; Low, F. E.; Suura, H. (1967). "Radiative Corrections toβDecay and the Quantum Numbers of Fields Underlying Current Algebra". Physical Review Letters. 18 (26): 1224–1225. Bibcode:1967PhRvL..18.1224J. doi:10.1103/PhysRevLett.18.1224.
- Rosner, Jonathan L.; Suura, Hiroshi (1969). "General Treatment of ππ → πA_{1} in the Veneziano Model". Physical Review. 187 (5): 1905–1912. doi:10.1103/PhysRev.187.1905.
- Suura, H. (1969). "Veneziano-Type Form Factors for the Pion". Physical Review Letters. 23 (10): 551–554. Bibcode:1969PhRvL..23..551S. doi:10.1103/PhysRevLett.23.551.
- Suura, H.; Walsh, T. F.; Young, B.-L. (1972). "Testing Triplet Models (No. COO-1764-152; DESY-72/21). Deutsches Elektronen-Synchrotron, Hamburg (West Germany)". doi:10.2172/4605475. OSTI 4605475.
- Suura, H.; Young, Bing-Lin (1972). "Quark-loop dynamics and meson decays". Il Nuovo Cimento A. 11 (1): 101–120. Bibcode:1972NCimA..11..101S. doi:10.1007/BF02722781. OSTI 4549906. S2CID 117725112.
- Suura, H.; Young, Bing-Lin (1973). "Derivation of General Conservation Laws and Ward-Takahashi Identities in the Functional Integration Method". Physical Review D. 8 (12): 4353–4371. Bibcode:1973PhRvD...8.4353S. doi:10.1103/PhysRevD.8.4353. S2CID 123050241.
- Coon, D. D.; Suura, H. (1974). "Regge trajectories and the quark-gluon coupling constant". Physical Review D. 10 (1): 348–350. Bibcode:1974PhRvD..10..348C. doi:10.1103/PhysRevD.10.348.
- Suura, H. (1977). "Relativistic Two-Body Wave Equation and Meson Spectrum". Physical Review Letters. 38 (12): 636–639. Bibcode:1977PhRvL..38..636S. doi:10.1103/PhysRevLett.38.636.
- Geffen, D. A.; Suura, H. (1977). "Solutions to a gauge-invariant, equal-time two-body wave equation. Light-mass quark-antiquark system". Physical Review D. 16 (11): 3305–3319. Bibcode:1977PhRvD..16.3305G. doi:10.1103/PhysRevD.16.3305.
- Suura, H. (1977). "Gauge-Independent Two-Body Amplitudes and Vector Dominance Model of Electromagnetic Form Factors". Physical Review Letters. 38 (17): 927–929. Bibcode:1977PhRvL..38..927S. doi:10.1103/PhysRevLett.38.927.
- Suura, H. (1978). "Derivation of a quark-confinement equation in the Hamiltonian formalism of gauge field theories". Physical Review D. 17 (2): 469–482. Bibcode:1978PhRvD..17..469S. doi:10.1103/PhysRevD.17.469.
- Suura, H. (1979). "Equation of motion for string operators in quantum chromodynamics". Physical Review D. 20 (6): 1412–1419. Bibcode:1979PhRvD..20.1412S. doi:10.1103/PhysRevD.20.1412.
- Suura, H.; Wilson, W. J.; Young, Bing-Lin (1980). "Relativistic wave equation and heavy quarkonium spectra". Physical Review D. 21 (11): 3204–3211. Bibcode:1980PhRvD..21.3204S. doi:10.1103/PhysRevD.21.3204.
- Higashijima, Kiyoshi; Višnjić, Vladimir; Suura, H. (1984). "Composite models with chiral symmetry" (PDF). Physical Review D. 30 (3): 655–659. Bibcode:1984PhRvD..30..655H. doi:10.1103/PhysRevD.30.655. hdl:11094/3279.
- Miyazawa, Hironari; Obata, Yukio; Suura, Hiroshi (1993). "PASER and Meson-Catalyzed Fusion". Journal of the Physical Society of Japan. 62 (10): 3361–3363. Bibcode:1993JPSJ...62.3361M. doi:10.1143/JPSJ.62.3361.
