= James Edward Ryan =

American educator and author

9th President of the University of Virginia
- In office August 1, 2018 – July 11, 2025
- Preceded by: Teresa A. Sullivan
- Succeeded by: J. J. Wagner Davis (acting)

11th Dean of the Harvard Graduate School of Education
- In office September 1, 2013 – June 30, 2018
- Preceded by: Kathleen McCartney
- Succeeded by: Bridget Terry Long

Personal details
- Born: James Edward Ryan; September 21, 1966 (age 60)
- Spouse: Katie Homer
- Education: Yale University (BA); University of Virginia (JD)

James Edward Ryan Jr. (born September 21, 1966) is an American legal scholar. He served as the 9th president of the University of Virginia from August 1, 2018, to July 11, 2025. He served as the 11th dean of the Harvard Graduate School of Education from 2013 to 2018.

== Early life and education ==
Ryan was raised in Midland Park, New Jersey, and graduated from Midland Park High School as the valedictorian of the class of 1984. He graduated from Yale University and the University of Virginia School of Law, where he was a member of Omicron Delta Kappa.

== Career ==
Ryan clerked for chief judge of the 9th Circuit J. Clifford Wallace and then Chief Justice William Rehnquist. He served as Matheson and Morgenthau distinguished professor of law and Weber research professor of civil liberties and human rights at the University of Virginia School of Law, before taking the role of dean of the Harvard Graduate School of Education from 2013 to 2018.

=== University of Virginia ===
On September 15, 2017, the University of Virginia Board of Visitors unanimously voted Ryan as the next president of the University of Virginia. On August 1, 2018, he assumed the 9th presidency of the university.

On October 19, 2018, Ryan announced full scholarships for in-state undergraduates from families earning under $30,000, and full tuition for those earning under $80,000.

In June 2025, The New York Times reported that the United States Department of Justice had pressured Ryan to resign as part of resolving a civil rights probe into UVA's diversity, equity and inclusion initiatives. On June 27, Ryan informed the university's board that he would resign. On July 2, the university announced that Ryan would return as a professor following a sabbatical. His last day as the university president was set as July 11.

== Personal life ==
Ryan and his wife Katie have four children, and live in Virginia.

== Publication ==
Ryan authored the book Wait, What?: And Life's Other Essential Questions, as well as the book Five Miles Away, A World Apart: One City, Two Schools, and the Story of Educational Opportunity in Modern America.
