= Pompton Lakes High School =

High school in Passaic County, New Jersey, US

- PLHS on Commencement Day, 2008

Location
- 44 Lakeside Avenue; Pompton Lakes, Passaic County, New Jersey 07442; United States; 41.004822°N 74.289902°W

Information
- Type: Public high school
- Motto: "Pride and Tradition"
- Established: 1933
- School district: Pompton Lakes School District
- NCES School ID: 341335004930
- Principal: Scott Wisniewski
- Faculty: 52.3 FTEs
- Grades: 9-12
- Enrollment: 610 (as of 2024–25)
- Student to teacher ratio: 11.7:1
- Colors: Red and white
- Athletics conference: North Jersey Interscholastic Conference
- Team name: Cardinals
- Publication: Impact (literary magazine)
- Yearbook: Pioneer
- Website: plhs.plps-k12.org

Pompton Lakes High School (PLHS) is a four-year comprehensive public high school in the borough of Pompton Lakes in Passaic County, in the U.S. state of New Jersey, operating as the lone secondary school of the Pompton Lakes School District. The school serves students in ninth through twelfth grades from Pompton Lakes and Riverdale, in neighboring Morris County, whose students attend as part of a sending/receiving relationship. The high school is accredited by the New Jersey Department of Education.

As of the 2024–25 school year, the school had an enrollment of 610 students and 52.3 classroom teachers (on an FTE basis), for a student–teacher ratio of 11.7:1. There were 116 students (19.0% of enrollment) eligible for free lunch and 36 (5.9% of students) eligible for reduced-cost lunch.

The school mascot is the Cardinal.

== History ==
Pompton Lakes High School was built in 1932 during the New Deal Era in Colonial Revival style; it opened to students in September 1933 and graduated its first class the following June. Students from Pompton Lakes attended Butler High School before the opening of Pompton Lakes High School. When it opened, the school served students from Pompton Lakes and also received students from Midland Park, Oakland and Wayne. Since then, the school has maintained much of its original structure, with additions of a larger library, another locker room, and an entirely new wing erected in the 1960s.

Students from Wayne had attended the school until 1952, when Wayne Valley High School was opened. Oakland joined Franklin Lakes and Wyckoff in creating a regional school district in 1954 with students starting to attend Ramapo High School for the 1956–57 school year.

Midland Park's withdrawal was forced by Pompton Lakes. Those by Wayne and Oakland were voluntary; Wayne's was to accommodate the growth of the towns in the 1950s while Ramsey led to Oakland's. Pompton Lakes mandated Midland Park to leave after the end of the 1956-57 school year; this led Midland Park to open their high school.

Riverdale began their efforts to send their high school students to the school as early as 1975, and they started to attend in 1991, after the Riverdale district ended their sending/receiving relationship with the Kinnelon Public Schools, under which they had sent their high school students to Kinnelon High School; a far lower cost per student at Pompton Lakes and proximity were the main reasons for the change. Riverdale accounted for 114 of the 560 students attending the high school in 1995, nearly 20% of enrollment at the school.

== Awards, recognition and rankings ==
During the 1986-87 school year, Pompton Lakes High School was awarded the Blue Ribbon School Award of Excellence by the United States Department of Education, the highest award an American school can receive.

The school was the 153rd-ranked public high school in New Jersey out of 339 schools statewide in New Jersey Monthly magazine's September 2014 cover story on the state's "Top Public High Schools", using a new ranking methodology. The school had been ranked 85th in the state of 328 schools in 2012, after being ranked 173rd in 2010 out of 322 schools listed. The magazine ranked the school 156th in 2008 out of 316 schools. The school was ranked 188th in the magazine's September 2006 issue, which surveyed 316 schools across the state. Schooldigger.com ranked the school as 127th out of 376 public high schools statewide in its 2010 rankings (a decrease of 2 positions from the 2009 rank) which were based on the combined percentage of students classified as proficient or above proficient on the language arts literacy and mathematics components of the High School Proficiency Assessment (HSPA).

== Academics ==
Advanced Placement (AP) courses offered include AP Biology, AP Chemistry, AP Physics, AP Calculus, AP Statistics, AP United States History, AP English Literature and Composition, AP Spanish Language, AP German Language, AP French Language, AP 2-D Art and Design, AP Environmental Science, and AP Computer Science.

== Clubs ==
There are many different clubs that students can participate in at Pompton Lakes High School, including: Assembly Planning Committee, Book Club, Environmental Club, FBLA, Health and Wellness Coalition (HAWC), Health Careers Club, Interact, Marching Band, Spring Musical, National Honor Society, Peer Helpers, Performing Arts Club, Student Council, Student Movement Against Cancer (SMAC), Student Opportunities for Academic Recognition (SOAR), Yearbook, Varsity Club, Volleyball Club and Zonta club.

== Athletics ==
The Pompton Lakes High School Cardinals participate in the North Jersey Interscholastic Conference, which is comprised of small-enrollment schools in Bergen, Hudson, Morris and Passaic counties, and was created following a reorganization of sports leagues in Northern New Jersey by the New Jersey State Interscholastic Athletic Association (NJSIAA). Prior to realignment that took effect in the fall of 2010, Pompton Lakes was part of the smaller Bergen-Passaic Scholastic League (BPSL). With 453 students in grades 10-12, the school was classified by the NJSIAA for the 2019–20 school year as Group I for most athletic competition purposes, which included schools with an enrollment of 75 to 476 students in that grade range. The school was classified by the NJSIAA as Group I North for football for 2024–2026, which included schools with 254 to 474 students.

Boys sports offered include: football, soccer, lacrosse, cross country, basketball, wrestling, fencing, bowling, winter track, baseball, spring track, and tennis. Girls sports include field hockey, soccer, cross country, tennis, basketball, fencing, winter track, bowling, lacrosse, softball, and spring track.

The field hockey team won the North I Group II state sectional championship in 1975, 1977 and 1997-1999, the North I Group I title in 1986-1988, 1991 and 2008-2010, and won the North I / II Group I title in 1993; the team won the Group II state championship in 1999, defeating Collingswood High School in the final game of the tournament. The field hockey team is a perennial power in northern New Jersey. The team finished with a 17-1-2 record in 1999 after winning the Group II state title with a 3-0 win against Collingswood in the championship game. The Cardinals have won the Passaic County title 14 times, most recently in 2008 when they beat Wayne Hills High School 1-0 in the final. Pompton Lakes won three consecutive sectional titles from 2008–2010, defeating Boonton High School 2-1 in the 2010 final.

The varsity baseball team won the Passaic County Tournament championships in 1978, 1990, 1996, 2013, 2014 and 2017. Down 6-0, the 2017 team came back to win the program's sixth PCT title with a 10-6 win against Passaic County Technical Institute in the championship game. The team won the Group I state championship in 2024, with a 14–4 win against Point Pleasant Beach High School in the finals to finish the season with a 26–4 record.

The football team won the NJSIAA North I Group I state sectional title in 1982, 2005, 2011, 2012 and 2013 and won the North I Group II state sectional title in 1997. Down 14-0 at halftime, the 1982 team pulled ahead with four touchdowns in the second half to defeat Mahwah High School by a score of 28-14 in the North I Group I sectional championship game and finish the season at 11-0. The 1998 boys football team were the North I, Group II state football champions, beating Westwood Regional High School 7-6 on a snowy field. In 2005, the football team won the North I, Group I title, defeating Hasbrouck Heights High School 27-7 in the championship game played at Giants Stadium. The team won the North I Group I state title in 2011 and 2012 with a win over Glen Rock High School and Cedar Grove High School, respectively.

The boys' soccer team won the Group II state championship in 1996 (against runner-up Somerville High School in the tournament final) and won the Group I title in 2005 (vs. Bordentown Regional High School) and 2017 (vs. Glassboro High School). The 1996 boys' soccer team were league and state champions with an overall record of 23-1, with the team's only loss that season coming in the final of the Passaic County tournament to Paterson's John F. Kennedy High School. The 2017 team won the Group I state championship with a 3-2 win against Glassboro High School on a goal scored one minute into overtime.

The 2001 boys' tennis team won the North I, Group II over Rutherford High School 3½-1½ in the tournament final.

In 2001, the softball team won the North I, Group II sectional championship, edging Mahwah High School 1-0. The team repeated in 2002, again winning by a 1-0 score in the final, this time over top-seeded Hawthorne High School, their first sectional championship since their win in 2002. The 2007 team won the title, with a 4-1 win vs. Saddle Brook High School. The 2008 team repeated the North I, Group I title, defeating Park Ridge High School 8-3 in the tournament final.

The boys' track and field team won the 2006 and 2007 North I, Group I state sectional championships tying Hasbrouck Heights High School in 2006 and winning outright with 65 points in 2007.

The girls' tennis team won the 2007 North I, Group I state sectional championship with a 4-1 win over New Milford High School. The win was the team's first ever state sectional title.

The boys' wrestling team won the North I Group I state sectional championship in 2015.

The school also has a marching band and color guard which competes in USSBA competitions. The Cardinal Marching Band has been a part of PLHS since the 1930s, with up to 100 students participating.

== Administration ==
The school's principal is Scott Wisniewski. His core administration team includes the assistant principal.

== In popular culture ==
Selected for its "beautiful auditorium, a great gymnasium" and other aesthetic qualities, the high school was used extensively as a filming location for the 1997 movie In & Out starring Kevin Kline. Many classrooms and other school facilities were used as the set for the movie, and many students were used as extras.

== Notable alumni ==
- Cat Bauer (born 1955), author
- Jacqueline Dubrovich (born 1994), Olympic foil fencer who won a gold medal in women's team foil at the 2024 Summer Olympics
- Larry Elgart (1922-2017), jazz bandleader who, with his brother Les, recorded "Bandstand Boogie", the theme to the long-running dance show American Bandstand
- Les Elgart (1917-1995), trumpet player and bandleader
- Scott Ellsworth (born 1927), radio personality, news presenter and actor
- Charlie Getty (born 1952), played ten seasons in the NFL, mainly for the Kansas City Chiefs
- Carol Habben (1933-1997), center fielder and backup catcher who played from 1951 through 1954 in the All-American Girls Professional Baseball League
- Marty Isenberg (born 1963), animation writer
- Fred Kornet (1919–2018, class of 1936), lieutenant general in the United States Army who served as commander of the U.S. Army Aviation Systems Command
- Sharon Pfluger (born 1960), women's college lacrosse and field hockey coach for The College of New Jersey who is the NCAA career wins leader of women's lacrosse
- Robert A. Roe (1924–2014), politician who represented New Jersey in the United States House of Representatives from 1969 to 1993
- Carl Sawatski (1927–1991), professional baseball player and executive who was an MLB catcher for the Chicago Cubs, Chicago White Sox, Milwaukee Braves, Philadelphia Phillies and St. Louis Cardinals
- Patty Shwartz (born 1961), United States circuit judge of the United States Court of Appeals for the Third Circuit
- Travis Tuck (1943-2002), metal sculptor known for his hand-crafted weather vanes of repoussé copper and bronze
- Michael Weiner (born 1961), executive director of the Major League Baseball Players Association
- Donald R. Yennie (1924–1993; class of 1941), theoretical physicist
