= Paterson Catholic High School =

Defunct Catholic school in Passaic County, New Jersey, US

Paterson Catholic Regional High School

Location
- 764 Eleventh Avenue; Paterson, (Passaic County), New Jersey 07514; United States; 40°55′10″N 74°7′58″W

Information
- Type: Private, Coeducational
- Motto: Strength Through Faith & Knowledge
- Religious affiliation: Roman Catholic
- Established: 1967
- Closed: 2010
- Oversight: Diocese of Paterson
- Faculty: 22.6 (on FTE basis)
- Grades: 9–12
- Enrollment: 303 (as of 2009–10)
- Student to teacher ratio: 13.4:1
- Colors: Maroon and Gold
- Athletics conference: Bergen-Passaic Scholastic League
- Team name: Cougars
- Accreditation: Middle States Association of Colleges and Schools
- Tuition: $6,200
- Website: patersoncatholic.org

Paterson Catholic Regional High School was a private four year Catholic high school located in Paterson, in Passaic County, in the U.S. state of New Jersey. The school served students from ninth through twelfth grade and operated under the jurisdiction of the Roman Catholic Diocese of Paterson. Due to dwindling enrollment and monetary problems, the Paterson Diocese closed Paterson Catholic at the end of the 2009–10 school year.

As of the 2009–10 school year, the school had an enrollment of 303 students and 22.6 classroom teachers (on an FTE basis), for a student–teacher ratio of 13.4.

== Athletics ==
The sports teams at Paterson Catholic were nicknamed the Cougars, and both the men's and women's teams participated in the Bergen-Passaic Scholastic League. The Cougars had a strong athletic history capturing many league and state titles in different sports and producing many college and professional athletes.

The 1994 boys basketball team won the Non-Public Group B state championship in 1994 with a 65–63 win against runner-up St. Augustine Preparatory School in the tournament final at the Rutgers Athletic Center and went in as the top seed in the Tournament of Champions where they defeated Piscataway High School 66–56 in the semifinals before falling to third seed Orange High School in the finals to finish the season with a record of 26–3.

The girls basketball team won the Non-Public Group B state title in 1999 (defeating St. Joseph High School in the tournament final) and 2009 (vs. Bishop Eustace Preparatory School). The team won the 1999 Non-Public B state title with a 46–37 win against St. Joseph of Hammonton, in the first finals appearance for each of the two schools. The 2009 team won the Non-Public B title with a 55–42 win against Bishop Eustace in the championship game played at the Ritacco Center in Toms River.

The football team won the Non-Public Group II state sectional championship in 1999 and 2000, and won the Non-Public I title in 2003, 2005 and 2007–2009. In 1999, the team finished the season with a 10–1 record after winning the Non-Public Group II state sectional title, the program's first since the playoff era started in 1974, with a 34–8 win against Gloucester Catholic High School in the championship game played at Alumni Stadium at Kean University. The 2000 team won the Non-Public Group II title by a score of 11–8 against Gloucester Catholic on a field goal kicked with seconds left in the game. The team's title in 2007 was its fifth since playoffs were instituted in 1974, joining Wayne Hills High School and Passaic High School as one of only three teams in Passaic County to have won five sectional championships.

== Notable alumni ==
- Kyle Anderson (born 1993, transferred), NBA player for the Memphis Grizzlies who transferred when school closed.
- T. J. Clemmings (born 1991, class of 2010), offensive lineman for the Washington Redskins.
- Victor Cruz (born 1986), wide receiver for the New York Giants.
- Fuquan Edwin (born 1991, class of 2010), professional basketball player for the Raptors 905 of the NBA G League.
- Kevin Freeman (born 1978), former professional basketball player.
- Stanley Jackson (born 1975), former professional quarterback.
- Myles Mack (born 1993, transferred), basketball player for Turów Zgorzelec of the Polish Basketball League.
- Al-Quadin Muhammad (born 1995, transferred), defensive end for the Detroit Lions.
- Jason Perry (born 1976), former safety in the NFL from 1999 to 2002.
- Lori L. Robinson, United States Army major general serving as the 80th Commandant of the United States Military Academy
- Jordan Theodore (born 1989), professional basketball player who currently plays for the Frankfurt Skyliners of the German Basketball League.
- Tim Thomas (born 1977, Class of 1996), NBA player.
- Darryl Watkins (born 1984, class of 2003), NBA player.
