= T. J. Clemmings =

American football player (born 1991)

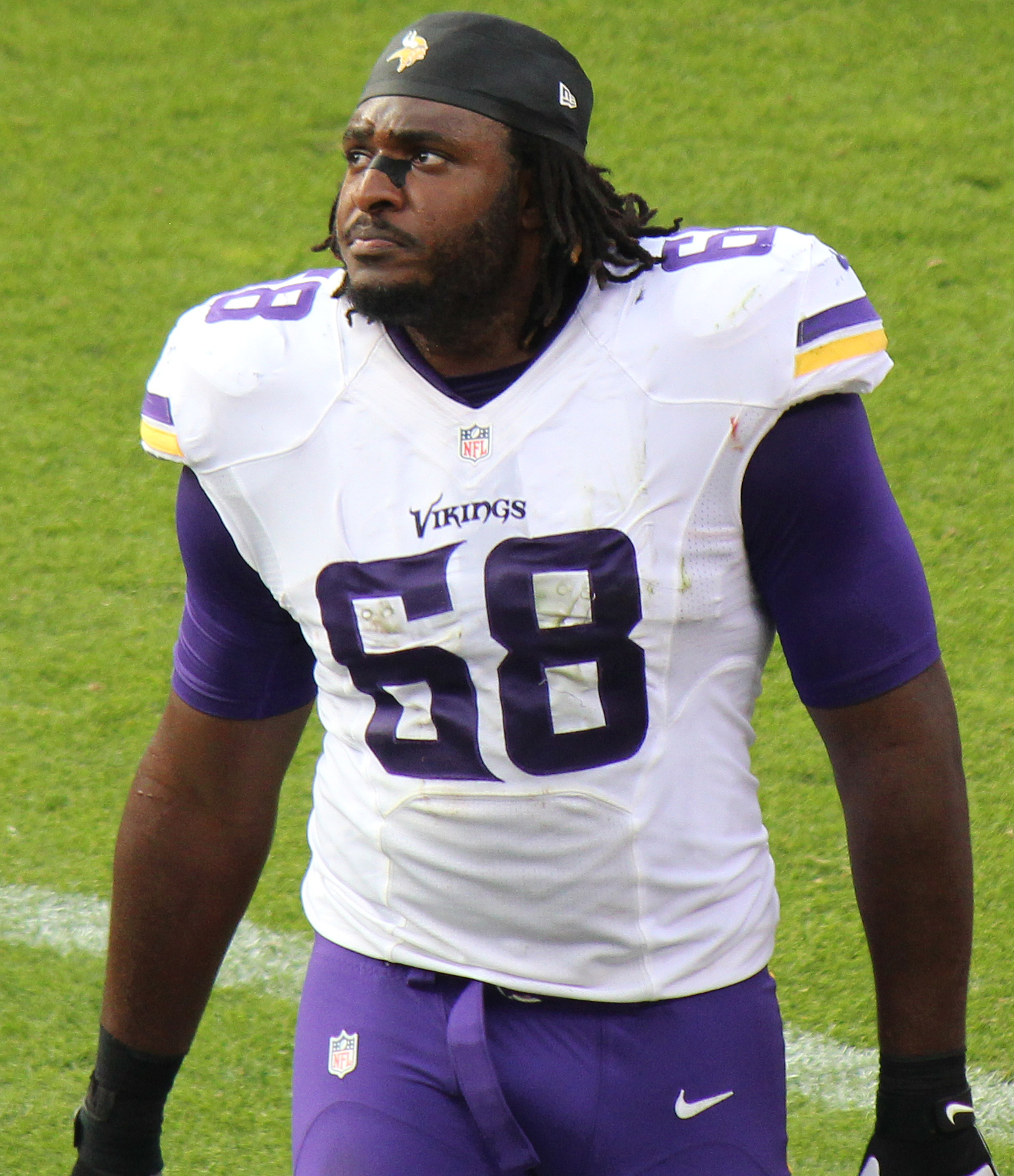
- Clemmings with the Minnesota Vikings in 2015

No. 68, 69, 74, 79
- Position: Offensive tackle

Personal information
- Born: November 18, 1991 (age 35); Mount Vernon, New York, U.S.
- Listed height: 6 ft 5 in (1.96 m)
- Listed weight: 309 lb (140 kg)

Career information
- High school: Paterson Catholic (Paterson, New Jersey)
- College: Pittsburgh (2010–2014)
- NFL draft: 2015: 4th round, 110th overall pick

Career history
- Minnesota Vikings (2015–2016); Washington Redskins (2017); Oakland Raiders (2018); Chicago Bears (2019)

Awards and highlights
- First-team All-ACC (2014)

Career NFL statistics
- Games played: 41
- Games started: 32
- Stats at Pro Football Reference

Trevor Anthony "T. J." Clemmings (born November 18, 1991) is an American former professional football player who was an offensive tackle in the National Football League (NFL). He played college football for the Pittsburgh Panthers and was selected by the Minnesota Vikings in the fourth round of the 2015 NFL draft. He also played for the Washington Redskins and Oakland Raiders.

== Early life ==
A native of Teaneck, New Jersey, Clemmings attended the since-defunct Paterson Catholic High School in Paterson, New Jersey, where he led the Cougars to back-to-back Non-Public Group I state championships. He started out playing basketball in high school on a team that included future NBA player Kyle Anderson and switched sports despite his mother's concerns about the risks of injury in football. Despite playing only two seasons of high school football at Paterson Catholic, he earned status as the top overall prospect in the state of New Jersey. As a senior, he helped lead his team to a perfect 11–0 record en route to the title. For the season, he collected 73 tackles, seven sacks and seven forced fumbles. Following his senior season, he was named North Jersey Defensive Player of the Year, All-New Jersey, All-New Jersey Non-Public, All-Passaic County and All-BPSL (Bergen-Passaic Scholastic League).

He also established himself as a Division I prospect in basketball and received scholarship offers from Big East schools Providence and Seton Hall after he spearheaded a defense that notched five shutouts and yielded just 41 points on the year (3.7 points per game). In track & field, Clemmings notched a top-throw of 12.90 meters (42 feet, 3 inches) in the shot put as a senior in 2009.

Regarded as a four-star recruit by Rivals.com, Clemmings was ranked as the state's No. 2 prospect and the country's No. 16 strongside defensive end. Scout.com rated him the No. 1 overall player in New Jersey and the nation's No. 6 defensive end prospect, as well as the country's No. 38 player overall. He was selected to PrepStar "Dream Team" and was rated one of the country's top 50 overall prospects by PrepStar. In June 2009, Clemmings committed to the University of Pittsburgh to play college football.

== College career ==
Clemmings played defensive end his first three years at Pittsburgh. As a true freshman he appeared in eight games, making three tackles. After being redshirted in 2011, Clemmings played in eight games in 2012 with six starts, finishing with 20 tackles. Prior to the 2012 BBVA Compass Bowl, he was switched from defensive end to offensive tackle. In 2013, he became a full-time offensive tackle and started all 13 games at right tackle. Clemmings returned as a starter in 2014.

== Professional career ==
=== Pre-draft ===
Clemmings entered the draft process as one of the top prospects in his position and likely a first round selection, but fell on draft boards presumably because of a report that surfaced in the week leading up to the 2015 NFL draft saying he had a stress fracture in his foot.

External videos
- Clemmings' NFL Combine workout
- Clemmings gets drafted by Minnesota

Pre-draft measurables
Height	Weight	40-yard dash	10-yard split	20-yard split	20-yard shuttle	Three-cone drill	Vertical jump	Broad jump	Bench press
6 ft 4 3/4 in (1.95 m)	309 lb (140 kg)	5.14 s	1.82 s	3.02 s	4.54 s	7.68 s	32.5 in (0.83 m)	9 ft 3 in (2.82 m)	22 reps
All values from NFL Combine

At the 2015 NFL Combine, Clemmings was the best of all offensive linemen with a vertical jump of 32.5 inches (0.83m) and a 4.54 20-yard shuttle. He also showcased his strength by benching 225 pounds 22 times.

=== Minnesota Vikings ===
Clemmings was selected by the Minnesota Vikings in the fourth round (110th overall) of the 2015 NFL draft. He was the tenth offensive tackle selected in the draft. He signed a four-year, $2,804,955 deal that includes a $524,955 signing bonus that's all guaranteed.

Clemmings tied a franchise rookie record by starting all 16 games after the Vikings lost veteran starter Phil Loadholt at right tackle for the entire season due to an achilles injury. He joined an offensive line that helped running back Adrian Peterson lead the NFL in rushing with 1,485 yards and posted the fourth-ranked rushing attack in the league. After starting left tackle Matt Kalil was placed on injured reserve on September 21, 2016, Clemmings was announced as the starter for the rest of the season.

On September 2, 2017, Clemmings was waived by the Vikings.

=== Washington Redskins ===
Clemmings was claimed off waivers by the Washington Redskins on September 3, 2017. He was placed on injured reserve on November 16, 2017, with an ankle injury.

On September 1, 2018, Clemmings was waived by the Redskins.

=== Oakland Raiders ===
On September 2, 2018, Clemmings was claimed off waivers by the Oakland Raiders. He was placed on injured reserve on November 2, 2018, with a knee injury.

=== Chicago Bears ===
On May 31, 2019, Clemmings was signed by the Chicago Bears. He suffered a quadriceps injury in the preseason and was placed on injured reserve on August 27, 2019.
