= Fred Kornet =

American lieutenant general

Fred Kornet Jr.
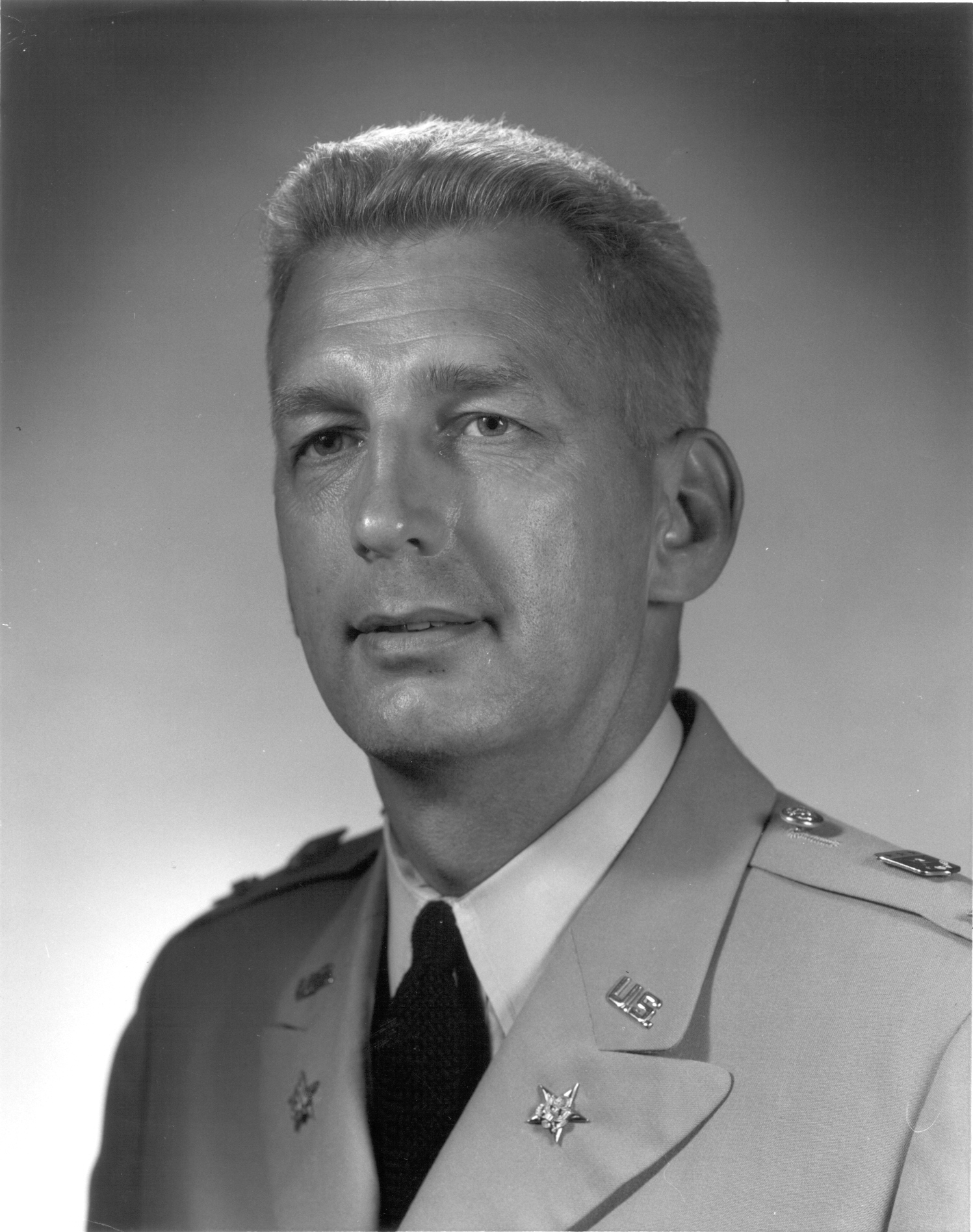
- Born: October 2, 1919; Wortendyke, New Jersey, U.S.
- Died: June 22, 2018 (aged 98); Madison, Mississippi, U.S.
- Military career
- Allegiance: United States
- Branch: United States Army
- Service years: 1940–1975
- Rank: Lieutenant general

Fred Kornet Jr. (October 2, 1919 – June 22, 2018) was an American lieutenant general in the United States Army. He served as commander of the U.S. Army Aviation Systems Command.

Born and raised in the Wortendyke section of Midland Park, New Jersey, Kornet graduated from Pompton Lakes High School in 1936 and then attended Lehigh University, where he majored in chemical engineering. He enlisted in the United States Army in February 1941.
