= Cat Bauer =

American dramatist

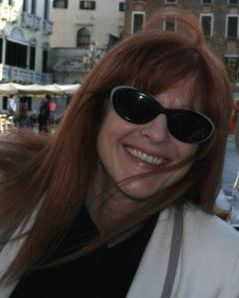
- Bauer in 2007
- Born: Catherine Bauer; July 27, 1955 (age 71); Greenville, South Carolina, U.S.
- Education: Pompton Lakes High School; National Shakespeare Conservatory
- Occupation: Author
- Website: www.catbauer.com

Catherine Bauer (born July 27, 1955, in Greenville, South Carolina) is the award-winning author of contemporary novels featuring the young protagonist, Harley Columba, and is known for her unique and honest voice. Publishers Weekly said, "Bauer creates a witty and resilient narrator in...Harley Columba... Readers will be rooting for this sympathetic heroine." In the Thomson Gale biography, the authors noted that: "Readers and reviewers often found the strength of Bauer's novel in the authentic voice of its heroine, Harley. Patricia Morrow, for example, in Voice of Youth Advocates (VOYA), remarked that 'Harley's voice is true to the experience of many young people,' and that 'Although the outcomes are not unexpected, they do not follow any formulas.'"

== Life ==
Bauer is the oldest of five children. She was born on an Air Force Base where her father was stationed in Greenville, South Carolina. According to family lore, she was struck by ball lightning while sleeping in her bassinet during a thunderstorm. She spent the first five years of her life in Kearney, New Jersey in the same three-family house as her paternal grandparents, and her summers at the Bauer family property on Bodin Lake in Upstate New York. Her grandfather was the foreman of Kearfott, where her father was also an engineer.

When she was nearly five years old, her grandparents relocated to Montreat, North Carolina, while her immediate family moved to Pompton Lakes, New Jersey, a small, suburban town in North Jersey which Bauer has fictionalized in her novels as "Lenape Lakes" -- "only forty-five minutes outside of New York City, if there's no traffic, although it may as well be four zillion light-years away since no one from here ever goes there." Bauer learned to read and use the slide rule before she went to kindergarten, and began writing books at the age of six. She showed musical ability at a young age, and played the clarinet, piano, violin and guitar, and was also active in the theater.

Bauer graduated with honors from Pompton Lakes High School in 1973.

After a brief marriage to her high school sweetheart, she moved to the West Village in New York City, and studied acting with Stella Adler and the National Shakespeare Conservatory.

== Acting career ==
She later moved to Los Angeles, California to pursue an acting career, and was active in the LA theater scene as both an actress and a playwright, co-authoring and performing in the cult hit, "Peacocks." She was a close friend and student of the late Don Richardson , whose former students also included Grace Kelly and Anne Bancroft. Bauer assisted Mr. Richardson with his book "Acting Without Agony," and it was in his workshop that she met her future husband, television director, James Quinn, noted for one-hour episode shows such as Law & Order. During this period, Bauer lived in the hills of Los Feliz.

== Writing career ==
In July, 1993, Sassy published her first short story, Run Away, which was the inspiration for her first novel, Harley, Like a Person. Under the working title of "Zee," that effort was the recipient of the very first Sue Alexander Most Promising New Work Award given by the Society of Children's Book Writers and Illustrators (SCBWI). Selected from manuscripts submitted for individual critique at the SCBWI Annual Conference in Los Angeles, the award is given to the manuscript deemed most promising for publication. Another in the list of "firsts," Bauer's winning entry was critiqued by Walter Dean Myers, the first-ever Michael L. Printz Award winner, a prize which recognizes excellence in young adult literature.

Bauer later changed the title of her first novel to Harley, Like a Person, which was originally published in 2000 by Winslow Press, a boutique publisher that filed for Chapter 11 bankruptcy in 2002.

John Lennon's life and work were major influences on Bauer, and her novels are peppered with references to the former Beatle. For example, Harley Columba was born on the anniversary of John Lennon's death, December 8, while her parents were attending a memorial concert in his honor.

In 2004, Holly Bolstad of White Bear Lake, Minnesota, won her state Level I Letters About Literature competition, a national reading-writing contest sponsored by the Center for the Book in the Library of Congress, together with Target Stores, by writing to Cat Bauer about how Harley, Like a Person had affected her life. To enter, readers write a personal letter to an author, living or dead, from any genre—fiction or nonfiction, contemporary or classic, explaining how that author's work changed the student's way of thinking about the world or themselves.

In April 1998, Bauer moved to Venice, Italy, where she lives today on the Grand Canal. She is presently divorced.

Bauer was also a regular contributor to International Herald Tribune's Italian supplement, Italy Daily, writing about the art, culture and architecture of Venice. Her popular blog, Venetian Cat - Venice Blog has been featured in the Financial Times Arts & Weekend Magazine.

On May 27, 2004, the Honorable Prudence Carter Beatty signed an Order reverting all rights to Harley, Like a Person to Bauer. That book was republished in a slightly different form in 2007 by Alfred A. Knopf, a division of Random House, Inc., New York, together with a companion novel entitled, Harley's Ninth, which takes place all on one day, October 9, John Lennon's birthday.

== Awards and recognition for Harley, Like a Person ==
- Booklist Top Ten Youth First Novel
- American Library Association Best Books for Young Adults
- Two-time Winner American Library Association YALSA Popular Paperback for Young Adults
- American Library Association YALSA Quick Pick
- New York Public Library Book for the Teen Age
- Bookreporter Top Ten Teen First Novel
- Book of the Year - First Place YA Fiction - ForeWord Magazine
- Oregon Young Adult Network Book Rave
- BookSense 76 Pick
- teenreads.com Top 10 Teen Book
- Teen People Book Club Selection
- CosmoGirl Book Club Selection
- Selected Adoption-Related Book No. American Council on Adoptable Children Awareness Guide
- Winner - SCBWI Sue Alexander Most Promising New Work Award

== Selected works ==
=== Novels ===
Harley, Like a Person ISBN 978-0-375-83735-7 Harley's Ninth ISBN 978-0-375-83736-4

=== Collections ===
Sixteen - Stories About that Sweet and Bitter Birthday, edited by Megan McCafferty
Lines in the Sand, New Writing on War and Peace
Time Out Venice: Verona, Treviso and the Veneto Time Out Guides
