= Iron Building (Watervliet Arsenal) =

Historic building in Watervliet, New York, US

- U.S. Historic district – Contributing property
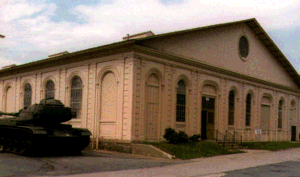
- Location: Building 38; Watervliet Arsenal; Watervliet, New York
- Coordinates: 42°43′06″N 73°42′31″W
- Built: 1859
- Part of: Watervliet Arsenal (ID66000503)

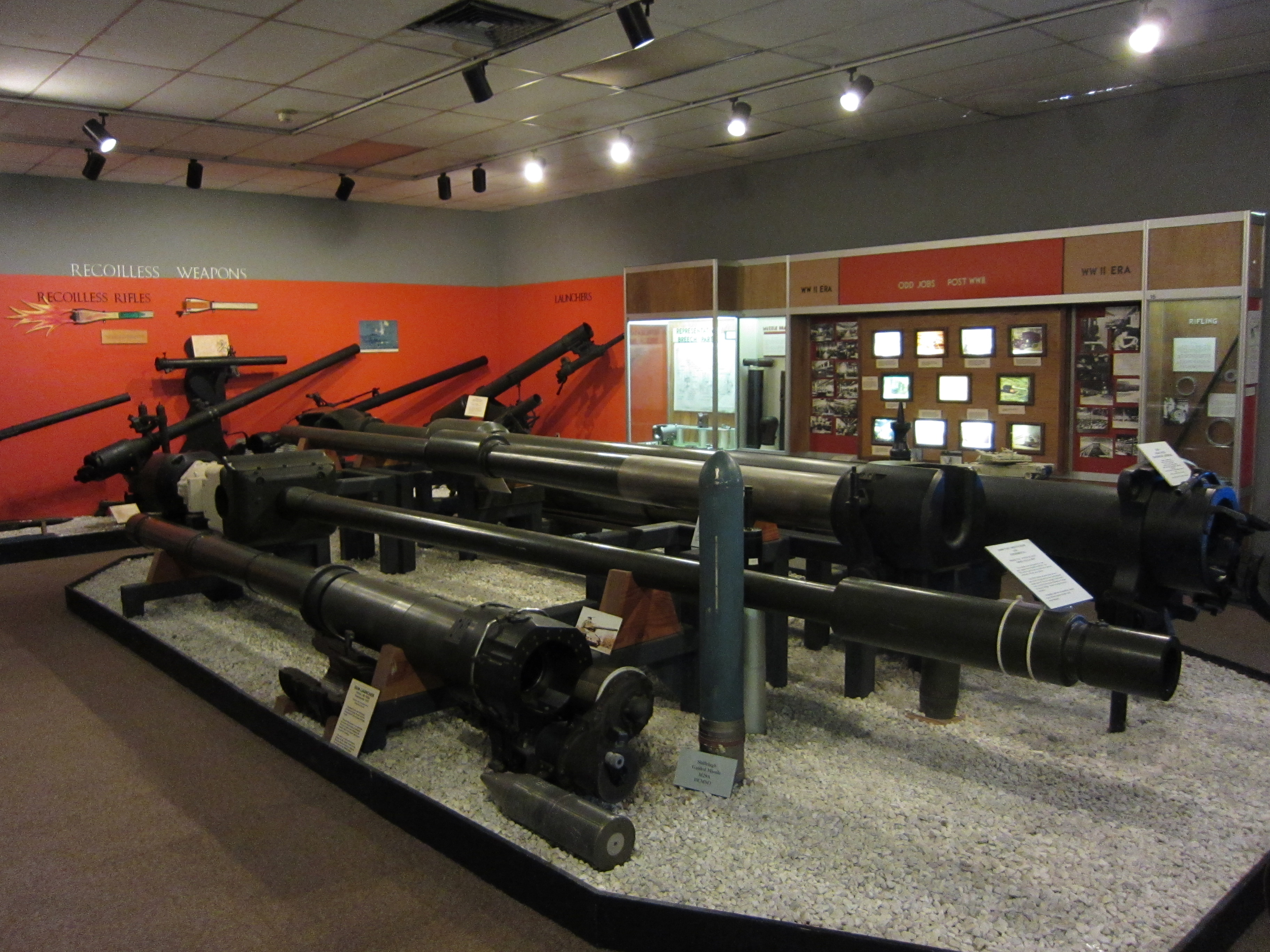
Museum interior

The Iron Building is a historic building at the Watervliet Arsenal in Watervliet, New York. It housed the Watervliet Arsenal Museum until it was closed in fall 2013 for security reasons. Despite the support of the city government and the Watervliet Historical Society for a reopening, the U.S. Army Center of Military History decided it would not be possible to continue allowing public access to the museum within a secure military base.

The Iron Building was built in 1859 and is "an outstanding example" of pre-fabricated cast iron construction. It is also the only building at the Arsenal to have a strong degree of Italianate styling.

The building was designated as a National Historic Civil Engineering Landmark by the American Society of Civil Engineers in 1983.

== History ==
Architectural Iron Works of New York constructed the prefabricated cast iron structure.
