= Midland Park High School =

High school in Bergen County, New Jersey, US

Midland Park Jr./Sr. High School

Location
- 250 Prospect Street; Midland Park, Bergen County, New Jersey 07432; United States; 41.000118°N 74.138713°W

Information
- Type: Public high school
- Established: September 1957
- School district: Midland Park School District
- NCES School ID: 341014000608
- Principal: Nicholas Capuano
- Faculty: 45.7 FTEs
- Grades: 7-12
- Enrollment: 367 (as of 2024–25)
- Student to teacher ratio: 8.0:1
- Colors: Green white
- Athletics conference: North Jersey Interscholastic Conference
- Team name: Panthers
- Newspaper: Panther's Pause
- Website: mphs.mpsnj.org/o/mpsnj

Midland Park Jr./Sr. High School, commonly known as Midland Park High School, is a six-year comprehensive public high school for students in seventh through twelfth grades in Midland Park, in Bergen County, in the U.S. state of New Jersey. Opened in 1957, it is a junior-senior high school operating as the lone secondary school of the Midland Park School District.

As of the 2024–25 school year, the school had an enrollment of 367 students and 45.7 classroom teachers (on an FTE basis), for a student–teacher ratio of 8.0:1. There were 24 students (6.5% of enrollment) eligible for free lunch and 4 (1.1% of students) eligible for reduced-cost lunch.

== History ==
Students from Midland Park had attended Ridgewood High School until 1935, after which they started attending Pompton Lakes High School. Due to limitations on space, the Pompton Lakes School District mandated that the district's high school could not accommodate students from Midland Park after the end of the 1956–57 school year. Midland Park's voters approved a referendum in 1955 that led to the construction of a high school costing $1.4 million (equivalent to $16.0 million in 2025) that opened in September 1957 on a site covering 22 acres (8.9 ha).

A 1973 plan to have students from Ho-Ho-Kus attend Midland Park High School as part of a regional agreement never came to fruition, despite official approval and encouragement by the New Jersey State Board of Education. Ridgewood had been hosting students in grades 9 to 12 from Ho-Ho-Kus for 75 years at Ridgewood High School as part of a sending/receiving relationship, though the board of education of the Ridgewood Public Schools decided to end the arrangement in 1973 due to overcrowding. A proposed regionalization agreement between Ho-Ho-Kus and Ridgewood had been rejected by voters from both communities in 1969. The state had recommended the formation of a regionalization agreement between Ho-Ho-Kus and Midland Park, though the choices of funding the combined district based on either property values or on the number of students would mean that one borough would shoulder higher costs than the other, regardless of which method was selected. Students from Ho-Ho-Kus attended the school through the 1990s, when the choice was made to shift students to Northern Highlands Regional High School.

SHIP, a program within Bergen County Special Services' Communication Continuum, is located at the school and educates students who are deaf or hard of hearing from grades 7–12. The program work with the educational staff to ensure student success, providing students with access to instruction, optimal listening environments, and appropriate modifications, in addition to advocating for them and supporting them in social emotional skill development.

== Awards, recognition and rankings ==
The school was the 78th-ranked public high school in New Jersey out of 339 schools statewide in New Jersey Monthly magazine's September 2014 cover story on the state's "Top Public High Schools", using a new ranking methodology. The school had been ranked 68th in the state of 328 schools in 2012, after being ranked 116th in 2010 out of 322 schools listed. The magazine ranked the school 44th in 2008 out of 316 schools. The school was ranked 66th in the magazine's September 2006 issue, which included 316 schools across the state. Schooldigger.com ranked the school tied for 76th out of 381 public high schools statewide in its 2011 rankings (an increase of 55 positions from the 2010 ranking) which were based on the combined percentage of students classified as proficient or above proficient on the mathematics (89.7%) and language arts literacy (96.2%) components of the High School Proficiency Assessment (HSPA).

In 2022, U.S. News & World Report ranked the school #54 in New Jersey High Schools, #145 in New York, NY Metro Area High Schools, and #1,277 in National Rankings using ranking factors that include college readiness index, college curriculum breadth index, state assessment proficiency, state assessment performance, and graduation rate.

== Athletics ==
The Midland Park High School Panthers participate in the Patriot Division of the North Jersey Interscholastic Conference, which is comprised of small-enrollment schools in Bergen, Hudson, Morris and Passaic counties, and was created following a reorganization of sports leagues in Northern New Jersey by the New Jersey State Interscholastic Athletic Association (NJSIAA). With 227 students in grades 10–12, the school was classified by the NJSIAA for the 2019–20 school year as Group I for most athletic competition purposes, which included schools with an enrollment of 75 to 476 students in that grade range. Prior to the realignment that took effect in the fall of 2010, Midland Park was a member of the smaller Bergen-Passaic Scholastic League (BPSL). The school's co-op team with Waldwick High School was classified by the NJSIAA as Group II North for football for 2024–2026, which included schools with 484 to 683 students.

The school participates in joint cooperative football and wrestling teams with Waldwick High School as the host school / lead agency. These co-op programs operate under agreements scheduled to expire at the end of the 2023–24 school year.

On November 9, 2007, the boys' soccer team defeated number 1 seed Wallington High School to claim the North I, Group I state sectional championship. The game was tied 1–1 at the end of regulation and was decided on penalty kicks by a 5-4 margin.

On November 10, 2007, the girls' volleyball team lost to Bogota High School in the title match of the 27-team Group I tournament at William Paterson University by scores of 22–25, 25-18 and 25–13.

In 2010, Junior javelin thrower Kaleb Zuidema set the New Jersey record with a throw of 224 feet 1 inch (68.30 m). Zuidema also went on to win the 2010 Penn Relays and won the High School Javelin National Championship.

In fall 2010, the boys' soccer team lost in the finals of the North I Group I championship to Wallington High School by a score of 2–1. In the Bergen Record, the North Jersey Boys' Soccer Top 25 placed Midland Park at number 7 when the season had come to an end. That season the team also won the NJIC Patriot B Soccer Title.

== Performing arts ==
Midland Park High School's performing arts program encompasses their concert band, jazz band, marching band, wind ensemble, chorus, madrigals, theater arts that include drama and musical, and broadcasting. Funding for these activities are provided by the Midland Park Performing Arts Parents who are dedicated to advocacy, volunteerism, and fundraising for these award-winning programs.

The Midland Park High School Concert Band is divided into two groups, the Concert Band which encompasses grades 7-8 while Wind Ensemble encompasses grades 9–12. Throughout the year, musical education is provided covering a variety of topics. Both the Concert Band and Wind Ensemble have performed together at previous sites that include New York City, Atlanta, Toronto, Williamsburg, Washington, D.C., Boston, California, Hershey, Nashville, and Baltimore. Other performance locations include the New Jersey Wind Symphony, Ridgewood Concert Band, Lincoln Center, USS Intrepid, and the United Nations.

The Midland Park Marching Band is comprised of students from grades 7-12 who attend the Midland Park High School Junior/Senior High School. The Marching Band is a member of the New York State Field Band Conference (NYSFBC) and performs in a two-month long competition season that ends with a championship held at Syracuse University in Syracuse, New York.

In October 2019, the Midland Park Marching Band competed against nine other bands in the Small School 3 category and won first place.

The school also hosts a marching band competition called Music in the Park, however, from 2013 to 2016 the competition was held at nearby high schools, Ramapo and Indian Hills High School in Franklin Lakes, New Jersey and Oakland, New Jersey.

The Midland Park High School Chorus is divided into Junior High Chorus which encompasses grades 7-8 while High School Choir encompasses grades 9–12. The Midland Park High School Madrigals is a select group of singers enrolled in the High School Choir.

The theater arts that include drama and musical have received nomination with the most recent from the Paper Mill Playhouse when they announced their 2022 Rising Star Award Nominations. The school received nomination for Outstanding Achievement in Scenic Design, Outstanding Achievement in Lighting, Outstanding Achievement in Costuming, and Outstanding Achievement in Hair and Make Up for their production of The SpongeBob Musical.

== Clubs and activities ==
The school has a combined 39 clubs and activities.

== Administration ==
The school's principal is Nicholas Capuano. His core administration team includes two assistant principals, one of whom is the athletic director.

== Demographics ==
As of the 2022 Midland Park High Junior/Senior High School was 79.8% White, 14% Hispanic, 4.2% Asian, 1.1% Two or more races, 0.3% Black, 0.3% American Indian/Alaskan Native, and 0.3% Hawaiian Native/Pacific Islander.

== Notable alumni ==
Alumni of the high school include:

- Roy Den Hollander (1947–2020, class of 1965), lawyer who gained notoriety as a suspected murderer after acting as an attorney in several unsuccessful sex discrimination suits on behalf of men
- Warren Farrell (born 1967), educator, gender equality activist and author
- Drew Gibbs (1962–2021, class of 1980), football coach who was head coach of the Kean University Cougars during the 1989 season and was a head coach at Ramapo High School
- James Edward Ryan (born 1966, class of 1984), legal scholar who served as the 9th president of the University of Virginia from 2018 to 2025
