= Drew Gibbs =

American football coach (1962–2021)

Biographical details
- Born: July 8, 1962; Rutherford, New Jersey, U.S.
- Died: November 16, 2021 (aged 59); Ridgewood, New Jersey, U.S.

Coaching career (HC unless noted)
- 1989: Kean
- 1990–2000: Ridgewood High School (Asst.)
- 2001–2021: Ramapo HS

Head coaching record
- Overall: 3–7 (college)

Drew Gibbs (July 8, 1962 – November 16, 2021) was an American high school football coach who was head coach of the Kean University Cougars during the 1989 season and was a head coach at Ramapo High School. Regarded as one of the best high school football coaches in the state of New Jersey, Gibbs' teams at Ramapo only missed making the state playoffs once in his first seventeen years in the position.

Born in Rutherford, New Jersey, Gibbs moved to Midland Park, New Jersey and graduated from Midland Park High School in 1980, where he played prep football and wrestled at the varsity level. He attended Gettysburg College and transferred to Montclair State University for his final two collegiate years.

Gibbs served as an assistant football coach at Montclair State University and Kean University during the 1980s. He was head coach of the Kean University Cougars during the 1989 season, where he compiled a record of 3–7. He then served as an assistant football coach at Ridgewood High School, where he also coached wrestling.

In 2001, Gibbs was chosen to succeed Mike Miello as the head coach at Ramapo High School after Miello became an assistant coach at Rutgers University. Gibbs won five Group III, State Sectional Championships at Ramapo and has a career record of 167 wins against 48 losses. He was also named North Section 1 Coach of the Year by the NJFCA in both 2001 and 2009. Gibbs was elected as a member in the New Jersey Coaches Association Hall of Fame in 2014 for both his accomplishments as a head coach in football and wrestling, a sport where he has also exceeded 100 career victories.

Many of his athletes have gone on to college to play, some major schools include Rutgers University, David Bonagura and Chris Hogan and Syracuse University, Ross Krautman and Ricky Krautman.

On November 15, 2021, Gibbs experienced chest pains during a practice. He was admitted to a hospital in Ridgewood, New Jersey, where he died from complications of surgery the following day, at age 59.

== Head coaching record ==
=== College ===
Year	Team	Overall	Conference	Standing	Bowl/playoffs
Kean Cougars (New Jersey Athletic Conference) (1989)
1989	Kean	3–7	2–4	5th	
Kean:		3–7	2–4		
Total:		3–7			
