= Wortendyke-Demund House =

Historic house in New Jersey, United States

- U.S. National Register of Historic Places
- New Jersey Register of Historic Places
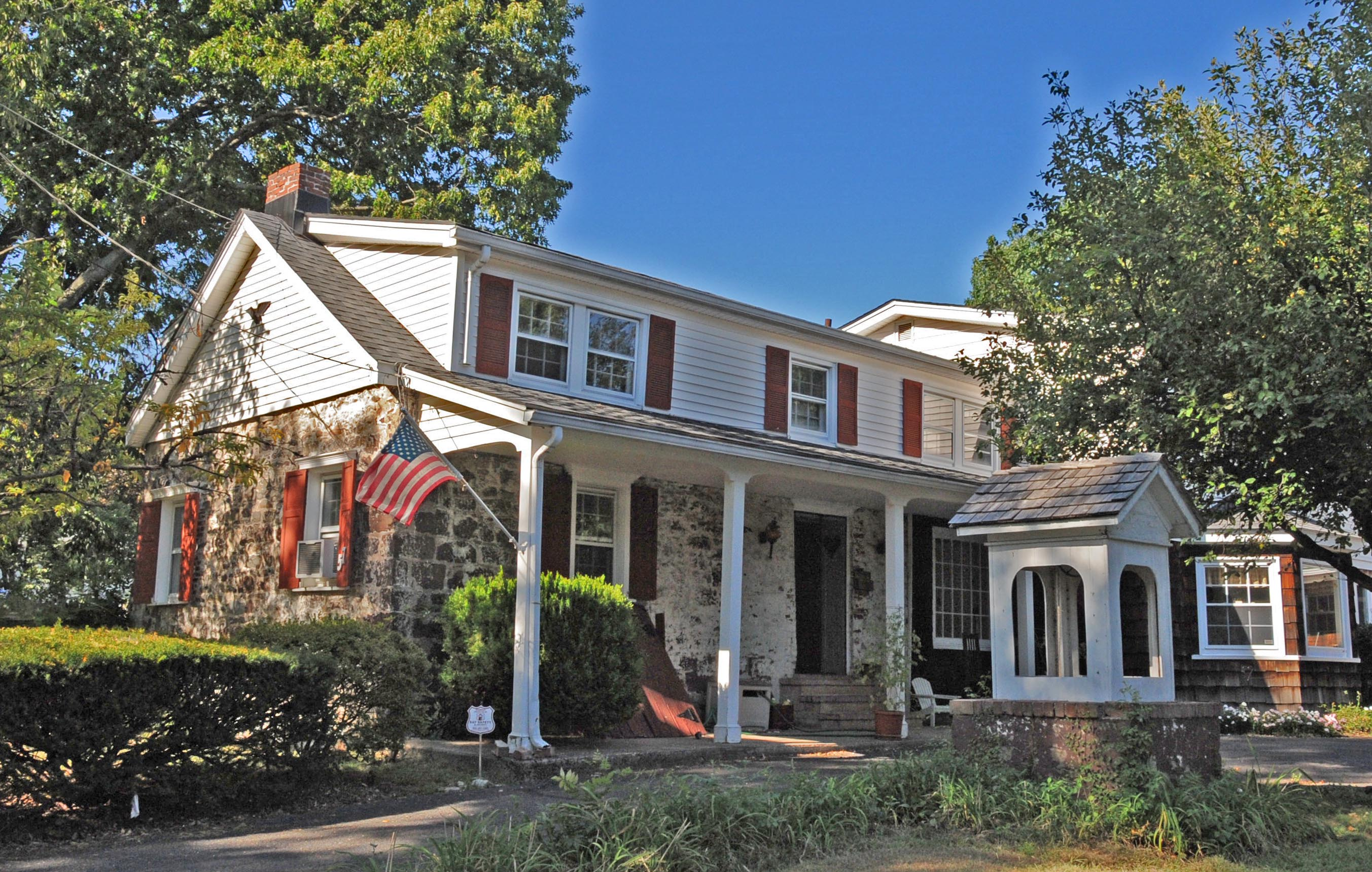

- Location within Bergen County, New Jersey Location within New Jersey Location within the United States
- Location: 57 Demund Lane, Midland Park, New Jersey
- Coordinates: 40°59′45″N 74°8′43″W
- Area: less than one acre
- Built: 1797
- MPS: Stone Houses of Bergen County TR
- NRHP reference No.: 83001590
- NJRHP No.: 579

Significant dates
- Added to NRHP: January 10, 1983
- Designated NJRHP: October 3, 1980

Wortendyke-Demund House is located in Midland Park, Bergen County, New Jersey, United States. The house was built in 1797 and was added to the National Register of Historic Places on January 10, 1983.

== See also ==
- National Register of Historic Places listings in Bergen County, New Jersey
