= Pompton Lakes School District =

School district in Passaic County, New Jersey, US

Address
- 237 Van Avenue Pompton Lakes, Passaic County, New Jersey, 07442; United States
- Coordinates: 41.004592°N 74.284683°W

District information
- Grades: PreK-12
- Superintendent: Denise Velez
- Business administrator: Angela Spasevski
- Schools: 4

Students and staff
- Enrollment: 1,697 (as of 2024–25)
- Faculty: 145.7 FTEs
- Student–teacher ratio: 11.7:1

Other information
- District Factor Group: FG
- Website: www.plps-k12.org
Ind.	Per pupil	District spending	Rank (*)	K-12 average	%± vs. average
1A	Total Spending	$18,647	30	$18,891	−1.3%
1	Budgetary Cost	15,766	37	14,783	6.6%
2	Classroom Instruction	9,511	41	8,763	8.5%
6	Support Services	2,038	26	2,392	−14.8%
8	Administrative Cost	1,940	43	1,485	30.6%
10	Operations & Maintenance	1,854	37	1,783	4.0%
13	Extracurricular Activities	424	21	268	58.2%
16	Median Teacher Salary	64,864	36	64,043
Data from NJDoE 2014 Taxpayers' Guide to Education Spending. *Of K-12 districts with up to 1,800 students. Lowest spending=1; Highest=49

The Pompton Lakes School District is a comprehensive public school district that serves students in pre-kindergarten through twelfth grade from Pompton Lakes, in Passaic County, in the U.S. state of New Jersey.

As of the 2024–25 school year, the district, comprised of four schools, had an enrollment of 1,697 students and 145.7 classroom teachers (on an FTE basis), for a student–teacher ratio of 11.7:1.

== History ==
Pompton Lakes High School was built in 1932 during the New Deal Era in Colonial Revival style; it opened to students in September 1933 and graduated its first class the following June. Students from Pompton Lakes attended Butler High School before the opening of Pompton Lakes High School. When it opened, the school served students from Pompton Lakes and also received students from Midland Park, Oakland and Wayne. Since then, the school has maintained much of its original structure, with additions of a larger library, another locker room, and an entirely new wing erected in the 1960s.

Students from Wayne had attended the school until 1952, with the opening of Wayne High School (since renamed as Wayne Valley High School). Oakland joined Franklin Lakes and Wyckoff in creating a regional school district in 1954.

Pompton Lakes mandated Midland Park to leave after the end of the 1956-57 school year; this led Midland Park to open their high school.

Students from Riverdale started to attend in 1991, after the Riverdale district ended their sending/receiving relationship with the Kinnelon Public Schools, under which they had sent their high school students to Kinnelon High School; a far lower cost per student at Pompton Lakes and proximity were the main reasons for the change. Riverdale accounted for 114 of the 560 students attending the high school in 1995, nearly 20% of enrollment at the school.

The district had been classified by the New Jersey Department of Education as being in District Factor Group "FG", the fourth-highest of eight groupings. District Factor Groups organize districts statewide to allow comparison by common socioeconomic characteristics of the local districts. From lowest socioeconomic status to highest, the categories are A, B, CD, DE, FG, GH, I and J.

== Schools ==
Schools in the district (with 2024–25 enrollment data from the National Center for Education Statistics) are:

Elementary schools

- Lenox School with 355 students in grades K-5
  - Michael McCarthy, principal
- Lincoln School with 344 students in grades PreK-5
  - Mike Renne, principal

Middle school

- Lakeside Middle School with 370 students in grades 6-8
  - Jake Herninko, principal

High school

- Pompton Lakes High School with 610 students in grades 9-12
  - Scott Wiśniewski, principal

== Administration ==
Core members of the district's administration are:

- Denise Velez, superintendent
- Angela Spasevski, business administrator and board secretary

== Board of education ==
The district's board of education, comprised of nine elected members and one appointed member, sets policy and oversees the fiscal and educational operation of the district through its administration. As a Type II school district, the board's trustees are elected directly by voters to serve three-year terms of office on a staggered basis, with three seats up for election each year held (since 2012) as part of the November general election. The board appoints a superintendent to oversee the district's day-to-day operations and a business administrator to supervise the business functions of the district. The Riverdale district appoints a tenth member to represent its interests on the Pompton Lakes board of education.
