= Donald R. Yennie =

American physicist

Donald Robert Yennie (March 4, 1924 – April 14, 1993) was an American theoretical physicist and professor at Cornell University. He is known for his work on renormalization in quantum electrodynamics and for early work on the structure of nucleons.

== Biography ==
Yennie was born in Paterson, New Jersey, on March 4, 1924, to Reinhart Yennie and Ella "Ellie" Clark. Raised in Midland Park, New Jersey, Yennie graduated from Pompton Lakes High School in 1941. He obtained his MA in physics at the Stevens Institute of Technology and his PhD in physics at Columbia University. He became professor at Cornell University in 1964 after working at Institute for Advanced Study, Stanford University and the University of Minnesota. He was awarded a Guggenheim Fellowship in 1978.

His Ph.D. advisor was Nobel prize recipient Hideki Yukawa. Yennie himself was the Ph.D adviser of, among others, Thomas Appelquist and Stanley J. Brodsky.

The covariant gauge choice ξ = 3 is named Yennie gauge after him. In 1961, with Steven Frautschi and Hiroshi Suura, he elucidated the role of infrared photons properly summed in high-energy quantum electrodynamics. This work was one of the keys to solving the problem of infrared divergences in gauge theories.
