= Wortendyke, New Jersey =

Populated place in Bergen County, New Jersey, US

- Unincorporated community
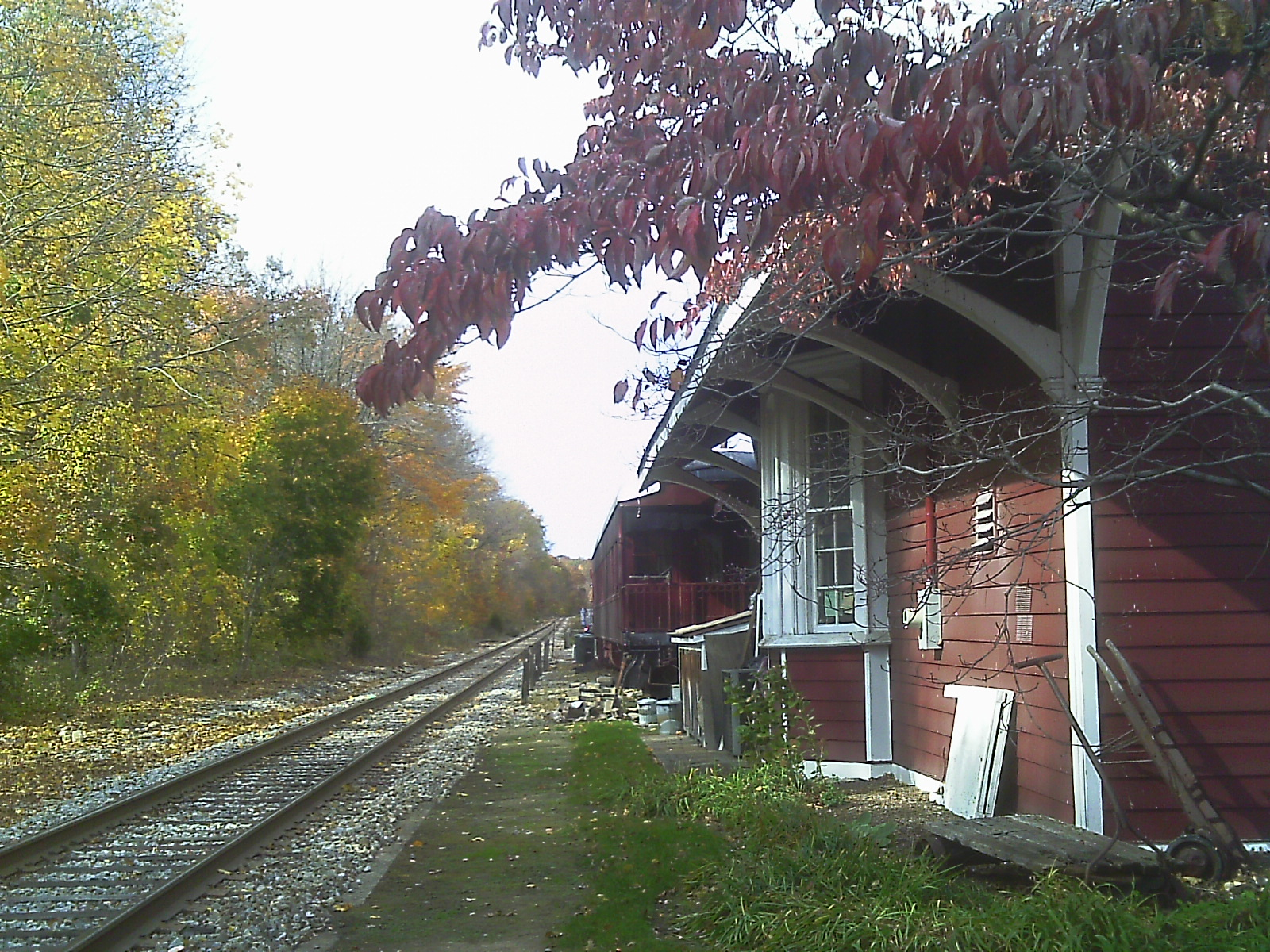
- Wortendyke Railroad Station

- Location of Wortendyke, Bergen County, New Jersey Wortendyke (New Jersey) Wortendyke (the United States)
- Coordinates: 40°59′51″N 74°09′01″W
- Country: United States
- State: New Jersey
- County: Bergen
- Borough: Midland Park
- Established: 1796
- Elevation: 266 ft (81 m)
- Time zone: UTC−05:00 (Eastern (EST))
  - Summer (DST): UTC−04:00 (EDT)
- Area codes: 201 & 551
- GNIS feature ID: 881955

Wortendyke is a residential and commercial unincorporated community located within Midland Park, in Bergen County, in the U.S. state of New Jersey.

== History ==
Wortendyke was established in 1796, originally named "Newtown", and then "Godwinville".

A Methodist church was organized in 1805.

A cotton mill was opened in 1812 by Cornelius Wortendyke. In 1875, his grandson, Cornelius A. Wortendyke, oversaw an extensive enlargement to the mill, as well as the addition of the largest silk mill in New Jersey.

The mills were located along Goffle Brook, and employed more than 500 people, many of them immigrants from the Netherlands. The cost of the workers' transportation to the United States, as well as their housing costs, was deducted from their pay.

By the early 1880s, Wortendyke had the largest school in the township, and a population of 300.

When the New Jersey Midland Railway was built in the 1880s, Cornelius A. Wortendyke was its president, and had the railway's principal shops located in Wortendyke. The Wortendyke Railroad Station is still located in the area.

== Historic sites ==
The Wortendyke-Demund House, constructed in 1797, was added to the National Register of Historic Places on January 10, 1983.

== Notable people ==
People who were born in, residents of, or otherwise closely associated with Wortendyke include:

- Isaac Wortendyke, New Jersey state senator from 1880–1883
