= Frederick Wortendyke House (Woodcliff Lake, New Jersey) =

Historic house in New Jersey, United States

- U.S. National Register of Historic Places
- New Jersey Register of Historic Places
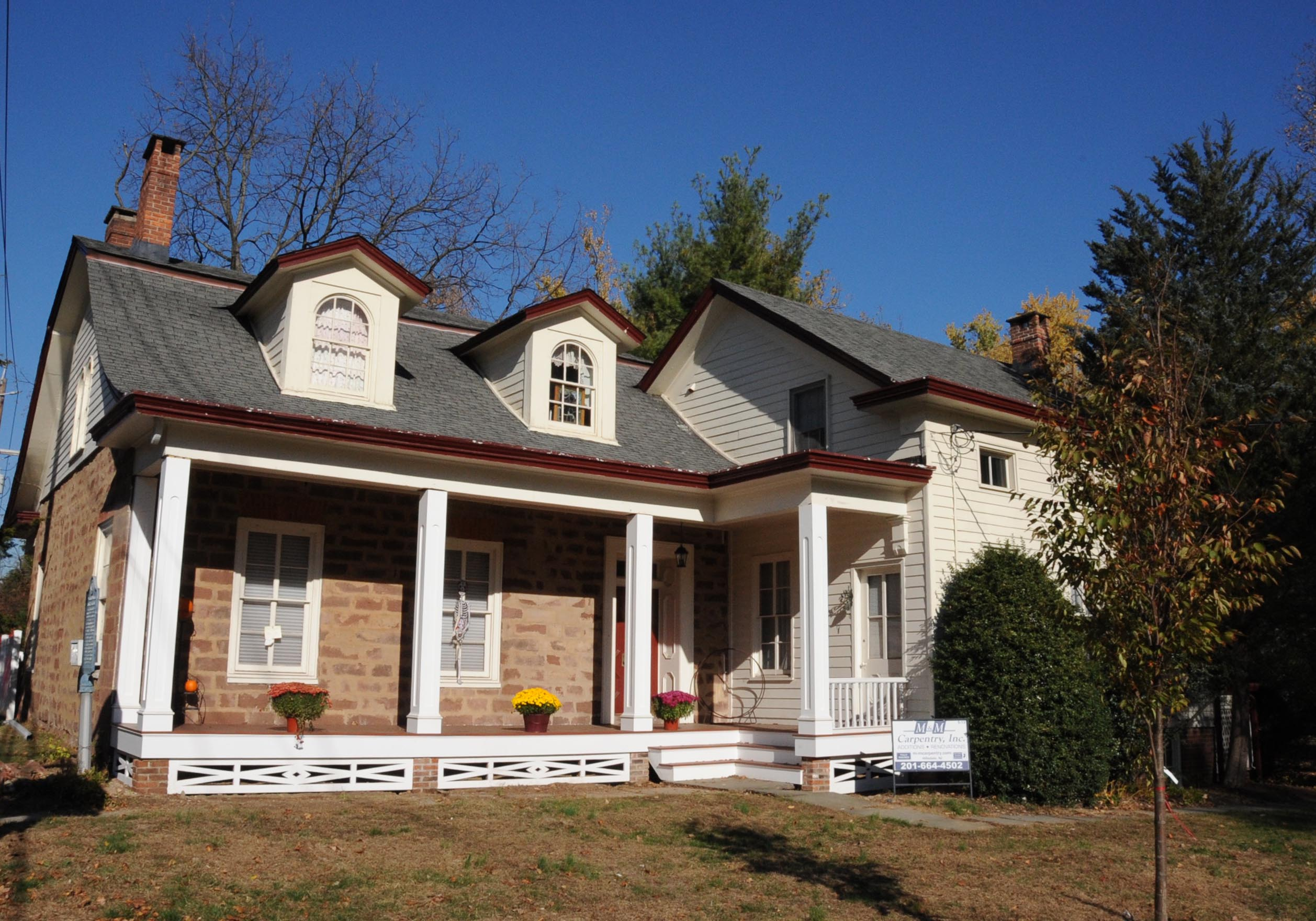
- Wortendyke Homestead in 2009

- Location within Bergen County, New Jersey Location within New Jersey Location within the United States
- Location: 168 Pascack Road, Woodcliff Lake, New Jersey
- Coordinates: 41°0′43″N 74°3′0″W
- Area: less than one acre
- Built: 1812
- Architects: Wortendyke, Frederick, IV
- MPS: Stone Houses of Bergen County TR
- NRHP reference No.: 83001591
- NJRHP No.: 727

Significant dates
- Added to NRHP: January 10, 1983
- Designated NJRHP: October 3, 1980

Frederick Wortendyke House is located in Woodcliff Lake, Bergen County, New Jersey, United States. The house was built in 1812 and was added to the National Register of Historic Places on January 10, 1983.

== See also ==
- National Register of Historic Places listings in Bergen County, New Jersey
