= Midland Park, New Jersey =

Borough in Bergen County, New Jersey, US

- Borough
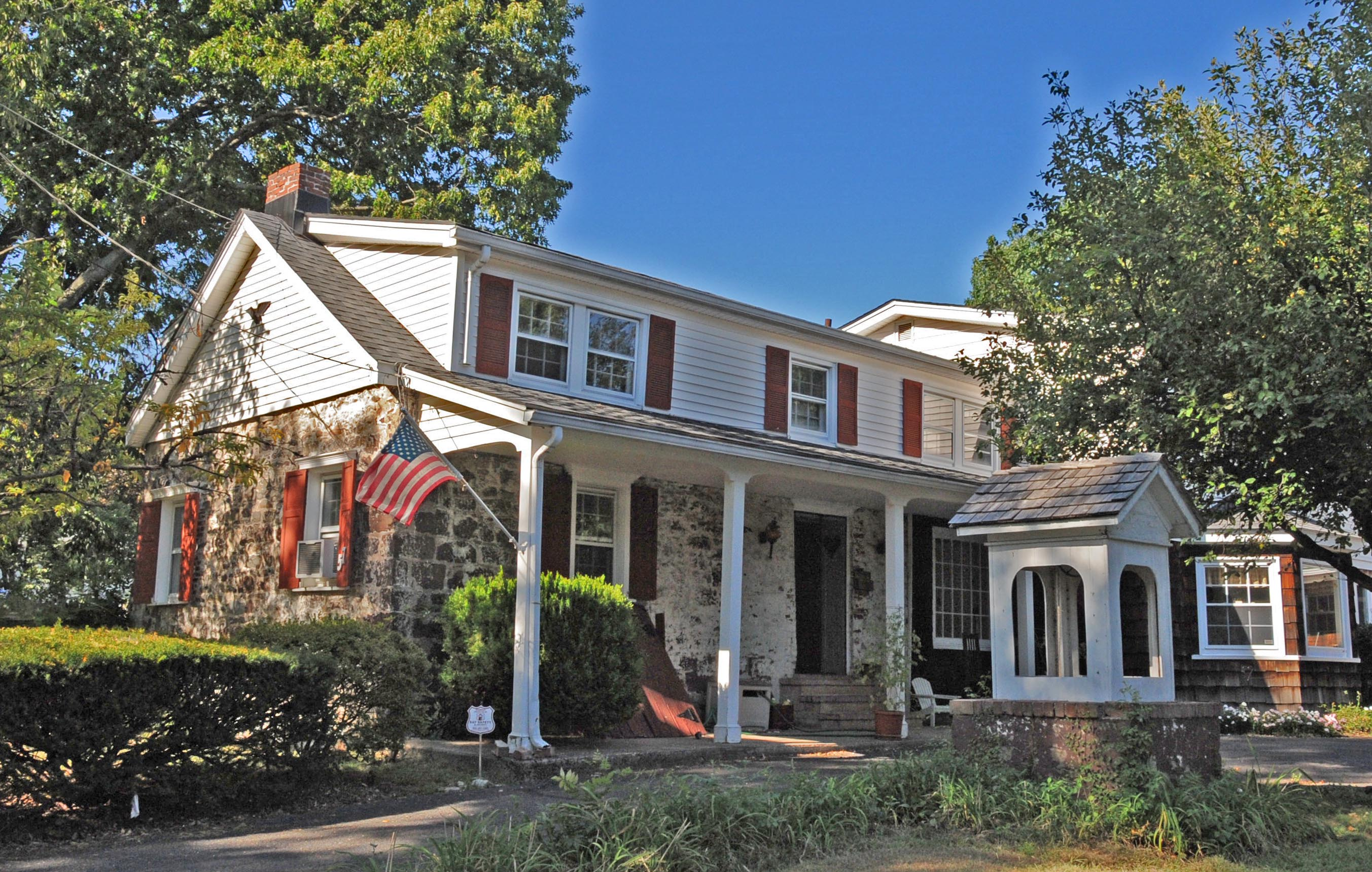
- Wortendyke-Demund House

- Seal

- Location of Midland Park in Bergen County highlighted in red (left). Inset map: Location of Bergen County in New Jersey highlighted in orange (right).

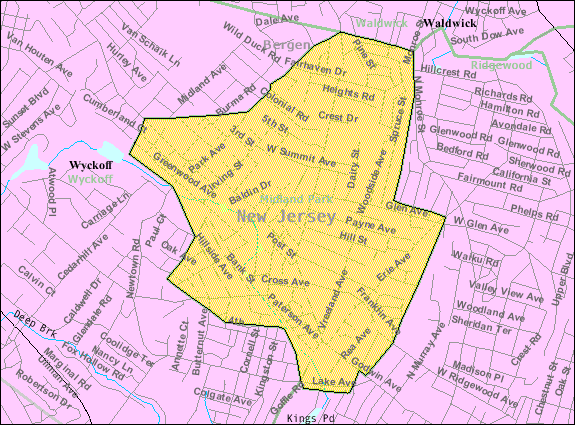
- Census Bureau map of Midland Park, New Jersey

- Location in Bergen County Location in New Jersey Location in the United States
- Coordinates: 40.995809°N 74.141262°W
- Country: United States
- State: New Jersey
- County: Bergen
- Incorporated: September 6, 1894

Government
  - Type: Borough
  - Body: Borough Council
  - Mayor: Harry Shortway Jr. (R, term ends December 31, 2023)
  - Administrator: Wendy A. Martin
  - Borough clerk: Wendy A. Martin

Area
  - Total: 1.58 sq mi (4.09 km^{2})
  - Land: 1.57 sq mi (4.07 km^{2})
  - Water: 0.0077 sq mi (0.02 km^{2}) 0.51%
  - Rank: 444th of 565 in state 57th of 70 in county
- Elevation: 312 ft (95 m)

Population (2020)
  - Total: 7,014
  - Estimate (2023): 6,970
  - Rank: 320th of 565 in state 52nd of 70 in county
  - Density: 4,464.7/sq mi (1,723.8/km^{2})
  - Rank: 136th of 565 in state 35th of 70 in county
- Time zone: UTC−05:00 (EST)
  - Summer (DST): UTC−04:00 (EDT)
- ZIP Code: 07432
- Area code: 201
- FIPS code: 3400346110
- GNIS feature ID: 0885300
- Website: www.midlandparknj.gov

Midland Park is a borough in Bergen County, in the U.S. state of New Jersey. As of the 2020 United States census, the borough's population was 7,014, a decrease of 114 (−1.6%) from the 2010 census count of 7,128, which in turn reflected an increase of 181 (+2.6%) from the 6,947 counted in the 2000 census.

Midland Park was incorporated as a borough on September 6, 1894, at the height of the "Boroughitis" craze then sweeping through Bergen County that led to the creation of over two dozen new municipalities in the county in that one year alone. The new borough consisted of portions of both Franklin Township and Ridgewood Township. The borough expanded in April 1920 by adding another part of Franklin Township. In a referendum held on June 9, 1931, Midland Park acquired additional land from Wyckoff (which until 1926 had been known as Franklin Township). Midland Park was named after the New Jersey Midland Railway, which operated the railroad passing through the area of the borough in the 1870s, though elsewhere the name is said to be based on being situated "amid Bergen hills".

== Geography ==
According to the United States Census Bureau, the borough had a total area of 1.58 square miles (4.09 km^{2}), including 1.57 square miles (4.07 km^{2}) of land and 0.01 square miles (0.02 km^{2}) of water (0.51%).

Unincorporated communities, localities and place names located partially or completely within the township include Wortendyke.

The borough borders the Bergen County municipalities of Ridgewood, Waldwick and Wyckoff.

The borough is divided by Prospect Street, a main road running north–south through the center of the town. Prospect Street is the southernmost end of what is otherwise known as Crescent Avenue (or West Crescent Avenue), which runs through Ramsey, Allendale, and Wyckoff.

=== Neighborhoods ===
Northside borders Waldwick and is the location of Midland Park High School. The Catholic church, Nativity, is also located on the Northside of the borough.

Wortendyke borders Wyckoff and is home to longtime retailers such as Rosario's, Romeo's Barber Stylists, and Creations by Fran, and other small businesses; this is the other, quieter downtown region of Midland Park, near Wortendyke Station.

South Central is the industrial region of the town, with fewer households. It follows the Goffle Brook and the New York, Susquehanna and Western Railway.

Southeast is the home of the Midland Park Shopping Center and to many other businesses.

== Demographics ==
Historical population
Census	Pop.	Note	%±
1900	1,348		—
1910	2,001		48.4%
1920	2,243		12.1%
1930	3,638		62.2%
1940	4,525		24.4%
1950	5,164		14.1%
1960	7,543		46.1%
1970	8,159		8.2%
1980	7,381		−9.5%
1990	7,047		−4.5%
2000	6,947		−1.4%
2010	7,128		2.6%
2020	7,014		−1.6%
2023 (est.)	6,970	▼	−0.6%
Population sources: 1900–1920 1900–1910; 1910–1930 1900–2020; 2000 2010 2020

=== Racial and ethnic composition ===
Midland Park borough, New Jersey – Racial and ethnic composition Note: the US Census treats Hispanic/Latino as an ethnic category. This table excludes Latinos from the racial categories and assigns them to a separate category. Hispanics/Latinos may be of any race.
Race / Ethnicity (NH = Non-Hispanic)	Pop 2000	Pop 2010	Pop 2020	% 2000	% 2010	% 2020
White alone (NH)	6,461	6,302	5,749	93.00%	88.41%	81.96%
Black or African American alone (NH)	29	51	70	0.42%	0.72%	1.00%
Native American or Alaska Native alone (NH)	4	2	6	0.06%	0.03%	0.09%
Asian alone (NH)	154	192	241	2.22%	2.69%	3.44%
Native Hawaiian or Pacific Islander alone (NH)	1	0	0	0.01%	0.00%	0.00%
Other race alone (NH)	10	9	34	0.14%	0.13%	0.48%
Mixed race or Multiracial (NH)	32	98	180	0.46%	1.37%	2.57%
Hispanic or Latino (any race)	256	474	734	3.69%	6.65%	10.46%
Total	6,947	7,128	7,014	100.00%	100.00%	100.00%

=== 2020 census ===
As of the 2020 census, Midland Park had a population of 7,014. The median age was 45.2 years. 20.4% of residents were under the age of 18 and 20.0% were 65 years of age or older. For every 100 females, there were 93.0 males, and for every 100 females age 18 and older, there were 89.3 males.

100.0% of residents lived in urban areas, while 0.0% lived in rural areas.

There were 2,750 households, of which 29.2% had children under the age of 18 living in them. Of all households, 57.9% were married-couple households, 13.4% were households with a male householder and no spouse or partner present, and 25.6% were households with a female householder and no spouse or partner present. About 25.9% of all households were made up of individuals, and 14.9% had someone living alone who was 65 years of age or older.

There were 2,887 housing units, of which 4.7% were vacant. The homeowner vacancy rate was 0.8%, and the rental vacancy rate was 6.4%.

=== 2010 census ===
The 2010 United States census counted 7,128 people, 2,756 households, and 1,924 families in the borough. The population density was 4,583.2 per square mile (1,769.6/km^{2}). There were 2,861 housing units at an average density of 1,839.6 per square mile (710.3/km^{2}). The racial makeup was 92.82% (6,616) White, 0.84% (60) Black or African American, 0.13% (9) Native American, 2.69% (192) Asian, 0.00% (0) Pacific Islander, 1.88% (134) from other races, and 1.64% (117) from two or more races. Hispanic or Latino of any race were 6.65% (474) of the population.

Of the 2,756 households, 32.4% had children under the age of 18; 58.0% were married couples living together; 8.9% had a female householder with no husband present and 30.2% were non-families. Of all households, 26.5% were made up of individuals and 13.9% had someone living alone who was 65 years of age or older. The average household size was 2.58 and the average family size was 3.17.

24.4% of the population were under the age of 18, 5.5% from 18 to 24, 24.9% from 25 to 44, 29.2% from 45 to 64, and 16.0% who were 65 years of age or older. The median age was 42.3 years. For every 100 females, the population had 92.3 males. For every 100 females ages 18 and older there were 89.0 males.

The Census Bureau's 2006–2010 American Community Survey showed that (in 2010 inflation-adjusted dollars) median household income was $87,905 (with a margin of error of +/− $9,258) and the median family income was $105,287 (+/− $9,882). Males had a median income of $74,688 (+/− $8,609) versus $49,398 (+/− $2,348) for females. The per capita income for the borough was $39,654 (+/− $3,206). About 1.5% of families and 3.2% of the population were below the poverty line, including none of those under age 18 and 10.4% of those age 65 or over.

Same-sex couples headed 8 households in 2010, an increase from the 6 counted in 2000.

=== 2000 census ===
As of the 2000 United States census there were 6,947 people, 2,613 households, and 1,883 families residing in the borough. The population density was 4,439.5 inhabitants per square mile (1,714.1/km^{2}). There were 2,650 housing units at an average density of 1,693.5 per square mile (653.9/km^{2}). The racial makeup of the borough was 95.81% White, 0.43% African American, 0.06% Native American, 2.22% Asian, 0.01% Pacific Islander, 0.76% from other races, and 0.71% from two or more races. Hispanic or Latino of any race were 3.69% of the population.

There were 2,613 households, out of which 32.7% had children under the age of 18 living with them, 62.8% were married couples living together, 7.2% had a female householder with no husband present, and 27.9% were non-families. 23.6% of all households were made up of individuals, and 9.8% had someone living alone who was 65 years of age or older. The average household size was 2.65 and the average family size was 3.19.

In the borough the population was spread out, with 24.3% under the age of 18, 5.8% from 18 to 24, 31.4% from 25 to 44, 23.9% from 45 to 64, and 14.6% who were 65 years of age or older. The median age was 39 years. For every 100 females, there were 95.2 males. For every 100 females age 18 and over, there were 92.2 males.

The median income for a household in the borough was $76,462, and the median income for a family was $83,926. Males had a median income of $55,044 versus $39,142 for females. The per capita income for the borough was $32,284. About 1.0% of families and 2.0% of the population were below the poverty line, including 1.1% of those under age 18 and 1.4% of those age 65 or over.

== Arts and culture ==
Musical groups from Midland Park include pop rock band Honor Society and the indie rock band Paulson.

== Government ==
=== Local government ===
Midland Park is governed under the borough form of New Jersey municipal government, one of 218 municipalities (of the 564) statewide that use this form, the most commonly used form of government in the state. The governing body is comprised of a mayor and a borough council, with all positions elected at-large on a partisan basis as part of the November general election. A mayor is elected directly by the voters to a four-year term of office. The borough council includes six members elected to serve three-year terms on a staggered basis, with two seats coming up for election each year in a three-year cycle. The borough form of government used by Midland Park is a "weak mayor / strong council" government in which council members act as the legislative body with the mayor presiding at meetings and voting only in the event of a tie. The mayor can veto ordinances subject to an override by a two-thirds majority vote of the council. The mayor makes committee and liaison assignments for council members, and most appointments are made by the mayor with the advice and consent of the council.

As of 2023, the mayor of Midland Park Borough is Republican Harry Shortway Jr., whose term of office ends on December 31, 2023. Members of the Borough Council are Mark Braunius (R, 2025), Lorenzo Damiano (R, 2023), Keith DeBlasio (R, 2024), Lorraine DeLuca (R, 2023), Kenneth Kruis (R, 2024) and Nancy Cronk Peet (R, 2025).

In June 2016, the borough council selected Jerry Iannone to fill the seat expiring in December 2016 that had become vacant following the resignation of Jack Considine who stepped down from office earlier in the month after he lost the Republican primary.

In November 2013, the borough council selected former councilmember Mark Braunius from among three candidates nominated by the Republican municipal committee to fill the vacant seat of Michael Junta, who had resigned in the previous month as he was moving out of the borough.

Jack Considine was appointed in January 2012 to fill the vacant seat on the borough council expiring in December 2013 that had been held by Patrick "Bud" O'Hagan, who had taken office as mayor.

=== Federal, state and county representation ===
Midland Park is located in the 5th Congressional District and is part of New Jersey's 39th state legislative district. For the 119th United States Congress, New Jersey's 5th congressional district is represented by Josh Gottheimer (D, Wyckoff). New Jersey is represented in the United States Senate by Democrats Cory Booker (Newark, term ends 2027) and Andy Kim (Moorestown, term ends 2031).

For the 2026–2027 session, the 39th legislative district of the New Jersey Legislature is represented in the State Senate by Holly Schepisi (R, River Vale) and in the General Assembly by Robert Auth (R, Old Tappan) and John V. Azzariti (R, Saddle River).

Bergen County is governed by a directly elected County Executive, with legislative functions performed by a Board of County Commissioners comprised of seven members who are elected at-large to three-year terms in partisan elections on a staggered basis, with either two or three seats coming up for election each November; a Chairman and Vice Chairman are selected from among its seven members at a reorganization meeting held every January. As of 2025, the county executive is James J. Tedesco III (D, Paramus), whose four-year term of office ends December 31, 2026.

Bergen County's Commissioners are Chair Mary J. Amoroso (D, Mahwah, 2025), Vice Chair Steven A. Tanelli (D, North Arlington, 2027), Chair Pro Tem Joan Voss (D, Fort Lee, 2026), Rafael Marte (D, Bergenfield, 2026), Germaine M. Ortiz (D, Emerson, 2025), Thomas J. Sullivan Jr. (D, Montvale, 2025) and Tracy Silna Zur (D, Franklin Lakes, 2027).

Bergen County's elected constitutional officials are Clerk John S. Hogan (D, Northvale, 2026), Sheriff Anthony Cureton (D, Englewood, 2027) and Surrogate Michael R. Dressler (D, Cresskill, 2026).

=== Politics ===
United States presidential election results for Midland Park 2024 2020 2016 2012 2008 2004
Year	Republican		Democratic		Third party(ies)	
Year	No.	%	No.	%	No.	%
2024	2,207	51.63%	1,984	46.41%	84	1.96%
2020	2,240	48.36%	2,332	50.35%	60	1.30%
2016	2,191	54.54%	1,690	42.07%	136	3.39%
2012	2,135	57.55%	1,533	41.32%	42	1.13%
2008	2,266	56.83%	1,695	42.51%	26	0.65%
2004	2,367	61.08%	1,491	38.48%	17	0.44%

As of March 2011, there were a total of 4,756 registered voters in Midland Park, of which 890 (18.7% vs. 31.7% countywide) were registered as Democrats, 1,865 (39.2% vs. 21.1%) were registered as Republicans and 1,998 (42.0% vs. 47.1%) were registered as Unaffiliated. There were 3 voters registered as Libertarians or Greens. Among the borough's 2010 Census population, 66.7% (vs. 57.1% in Bergen County) were registered to vote, including 88.2% of those ages 18 and over (vs. 73.7% countywide).

In the 2020 presidential election, Democrat Joe Biden received 2,322 votes (50.1% to 48.1% countywide), ahead of Republican Donald Trump with 2,240 votes (48.1% to 50.1% countywide). In the 2016 presidential election, Republican Donald Trump received 2,191 votes (54.1% vs. 41.1% countywide), ahead of Democrat Hillary Clinton with 1,690 votes (41.7% vs. 54.2%) and other candidates with 171 votes (4.2% vs. 4.6%), among the 4,100 ballots cast by the borough's 5,178 registered voters, for a turnout of 79.2% (vs. 72.5% in Bergen County). In the 2012 presidential election, Republican Mitt Romney received 2,135 votes (57.3% vs. 43.5% countywide), ahead of Democrat Barack Obama with 1,533 votes (41.1% vs. 54.8%) and other candidates with 42 votes (1.1% vs. 0.9%), among the 3,726 ballots cast by the borough's 4,978 registered voters, for a turnout of 74.8% (vs. 70.4% in Bergen County). In the 2008 presidential election, Republican John McCain received 2,266 votes (56.3% vs. 44.5% countywide), ahead of Democrat Barack Obama with 1,695 votes (42.1% vs. 53.9%) and other candidates with 26 votes (0.6% vs. 0.8%), among the 4,022 ballots cast by the borough's 4,941 registered voters, for a turnout of 81.4% (vs. 76.8% in Bergen County).

Gubernatorial election results for Midland Park
Year	Republican		Democratic		Third party(ies)	
Year	No.	%	No.	%	No.	%
2025	1,821	51.78%	1,681	47.80%	15	0.43%
2021	1,605	54.78%	1,304	44.51%	21	0.72%
2017	1,228	53.65%	1,019	44.52%	42	1.83%
2013	1,646	68.38%	738	30.66%	23	0.96%
2009	1,546	58.45%	962	36.37%	137	5.18%
2005	1,546	60.32%	956	37.30%	61	2.38%

In the 2013 gubernatorial election, Republican Chris Christie received 68.4% of the vote (1,646 cast), ahead of Democrat Barbara Buono with 30.7% (738 votes), and other candidates with 1.0% (23 votes), among the 2,438 ballots cast by the borough's 4,805 registered voters (31 ballots were spoiled), for a turnout of 50.7%. In the 2009 gubernatorial election, Republican Chris Christie received 1,546 votes (58.2% vs. 45.8% countywide), ahead of Democrat Jon Corzine with 962 votes (36.2% vs. 48.0%), Independent Chris Daggett with 131 votes (4.9% vs. 4.7%) and other candidates with 6 votes (0.2% vs. 0.5%), among the 2,658 ballots cast by the borough's 4,856 registered voters, yielding a 54.7% turnout (vs. 50.0% in the county).

United States Senate election results for Midland Park1
Year	Republican		Democratic		Third party(ies)	
Year	No.	%	No.	%	No.	%
2024	2,150	52.38%	1,873	45.63%	82	2.00%
2018	1,728	56.90%	1,208	39.78%	101	3.33%
2012	1,932	57.01%	1,401	41.34%	56	1.65%
2006	1,774	61.98%	1,049	36.65%	39	1.36%

United States Senate election results for Midland Park2
Year	Republican		Democratic		Third party(ies)	
Year	No.	%	No.	%	No.	%
2020	2,207	48.57%	2,272	50.00%	65	1.43%
2014	1,204	55.97%	912	42.40%	35	1.63%
2013	893	55.50%	704	43.75%	12	0.75%
2008	2,136	58.52%	1,473	40.36%	41	1.12%

== Education ==
The Midland Park School District serves students in public school for pre-kindergarten through twelfth grade. As of the 2023–24 school year, the district, comprised of three schools, had an enrollment of 897 students and 106.7 classroom teachers (on an FTE basis), for a student–teacher ratio of 8.4:1. Schools in the district (with 2023–24 enrollment data from the National Center for Education Statistics) are Godwin Elementary School with 239 students in grades PreK–2, Highland Elementary School with 283 students in grades 3–6 and Midland Park High School with 347 students in grades 7–12.

Public school students from the borough, and all of Bergen County, are eligible to attend the secondary education programs offered by the Bergen County Technical Schools, which include the Bergen County Academies in Hackensack, and the Bergen Tech campus in Teterboro or Paramus. The district offers programs on a shared-time or full-time basis, with admission based on a selective application process and tuition covered by the student's home school district.

Eastern Christian Elementary School is a private Christian day school that serves students in pre-kindergarten through fourth grade as part of the Eastern Christian School Association, which also includes a middle school located in Wyckoff and Eastern Christian High School in North Haledon.

== Transportation ==
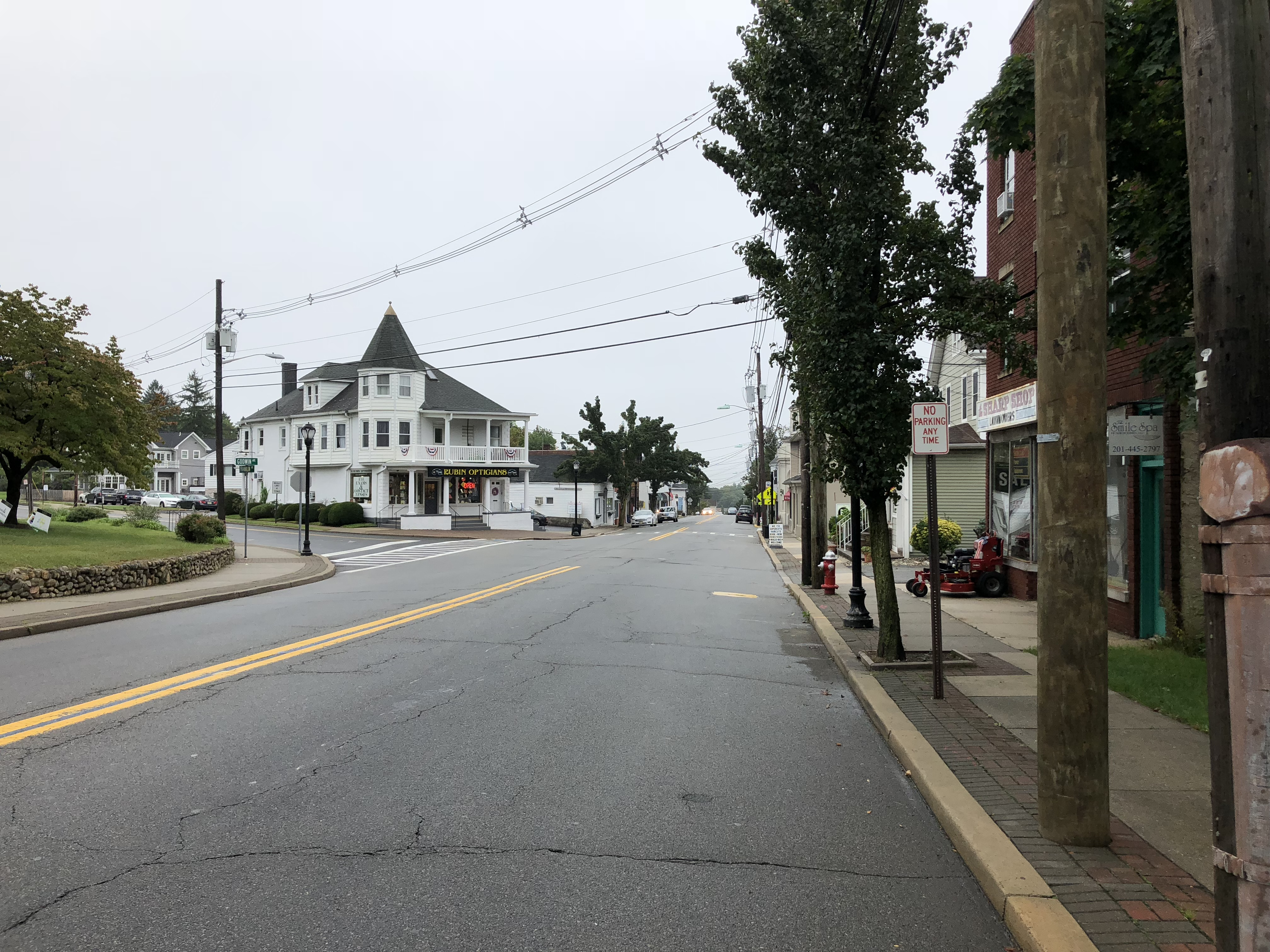
County Route 84 (Godwin Avenue), one of the main roads through Midland Park

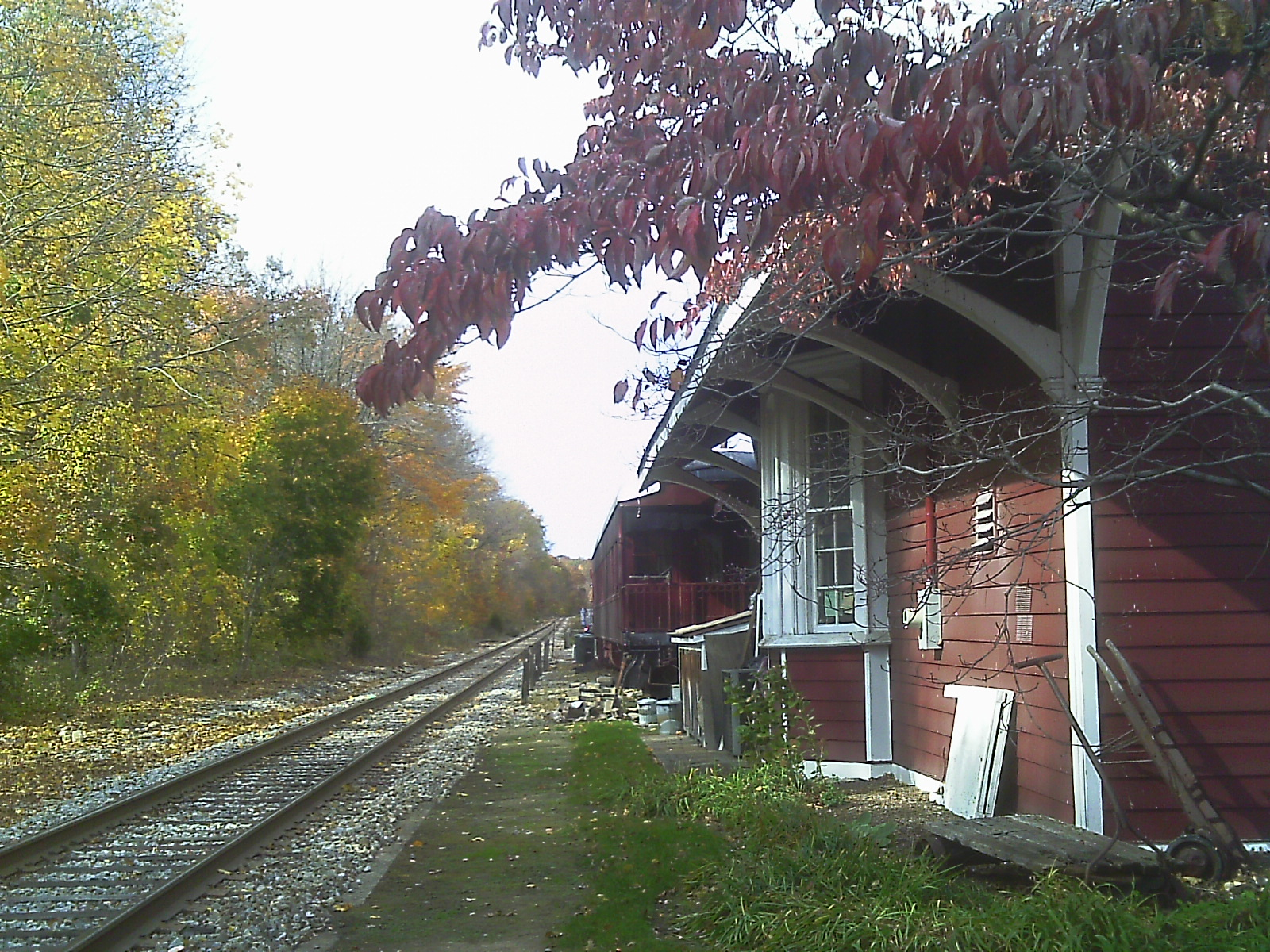
The Wortendyke station in 2010, along the active New York, Susquehanna and Western tracks. A caboose is visible in the distance, currently serving as a hot dog stand, known as the Hot Dog Caboose

=== Roads and highways ===
As of May 2010, the borough had a total of 25.66 miles (41.30 km) of roadways, of which 21.64 miles (34.83 km) were maintained by the municipality and 4.02 miles (6.47 km) by Bergen County. The most significant roads directly serving Midland Park are minor county roads such as County Route 84. Several major highways are near the town, however, including New Jersey Route 17 and New Jersey Route 208.

=== Public transportation ===
NJ Transit bus routes 148 and 164 provide service to and from the Port Authority Bus Terminal in Midtown Manhattan, with local service offered on the 722 and 752 routes.

== Emergency services ==
=== Police ===
Midland Park is served by a 18-man police force, including a Chief (Michael Powderley), two Lieutenants, five Sergeants, and ten patrolmen. The Midland Park Police Department responds to all variety of emergencies (including medical and fire) within the Borough, as well as special events.

=== Ambulance ===
Emergency Medical Services are provided to the borough by the Midland Park Volunteer Ambulance Corps, a 501(c)(3) non-profit charity founded in 1942 and funded by donations, which provides Basic Life Support (BLS) ambulance services around the clock on a volunteer basis, without any fees charged to users of its services. Advanced Life Support services (which are billed to the patient or their insurance) are provided by area hospitals through the Northern New Jersey Mobile Intensive Care Consortium (a.k.a. "MICCOM"), primarily by The Valley Hospital.

=== Fire ===
Dating back to 1909, the Midland Park Fire Department is an all-volunteer organization that provides full-time response to fires, motor vehicle accidents and search and rescue incidents within Midland Park. The department consists of approximately 40 active volunteers. The department staffs the following apparatus: Engine 531 – 2006 Pierce Lance Engine, Ladder 541 – 2015 Pierce 105' Ladder, Engine 532 – 2021 Pierce Engine and Rescue 542 – 1999 Peterbilt/Custom Rescue. The current chief of the Midland Park Fire Department is Matthew Tauber.

== Notable people ==
People who were born in, residents of, or otherwise closely associated with Midland Park include:

- Anna Whitehead Bodeker (1826–1904), suffragist who led the earliest attempt to organize for women's suffrage in the state of Virginia
- Roy Den Hollander (1947–2020), lawyer who gained notoriety as a suspected murderer after acting as an attorney in several unsuccessful sex discrimination suits on behalf of men
- Drew Gibbs (1962–2021), football coach who was head coach of the Kean University Cougars during the 1989 season and was a head coach at Ramapo High School
- Carol Habben (1933–1997), center fielder and backup catcher who played for four seasons in the All-American Girls Professional Baseball League
- Garrett W. Hagedorn (1910–1985), politician who served in the New Jersey Senate from 1968 until his death
- Fred Kornet (1919–2018), lieutenant general in the United States Army who served as commander of the U.S. Army Aviation Systems Command
- Nick Minicucci, college football quarterback for the Delaware Fightin' Blue Hens
- Dan Oates (born c. 1954), police chief of Aurora, Colorado, who graduated from Nativity School here
- Patricia Peardon (1923/24–1993), actress who originated the title role in the Broadway play Junior Miss
- Odeya Rush (born 1997), actress best known for her role as Fiona in The Giver
- James E. Ryan (born 1966), president of the University of Virginia
- Warren Terhune (1869–1920), 13th Governor of American Samoa
- Johnny Vander Meer (1914–1997), the only player in MLB history to pitch two consecutive no-hitters
- Donald R. Yennie (1924–1993), theoretical physicist

== Related reading ==
- Municipal Incorporations of the State of New Jersey (according to Counties) prepared by the Division of Local Government, Department of the Treasury (New Jersey); December 1, 1958.
- Clayton, W. Woodford; and Nelson, William. History of Bergen and Passaic Counties, New Jersey, with Biographical Sketches of Many of its Pioneers and Prominent Men., Philadelphia: Everts and Peck, 1882.
- Harvey, Cornelius Burnham (ed.), Genealogical History of Hudson and Bergen Counties, New Jersey. New York: New Jersey Genealogical Publishing Co., 1900.
- Van Valen, James M. History of Bergen County, New Jersey. New York: New Jersey Publishing and Engraving Co., 1900.
- Westervelt, Frances A. (Frances Augusta), 1858–1942, History of Bergen County, New Jersey, 1630–1923, Lewis Historical Publishing Company, 1923.
