= 16-inch/50-caliber Mark 2 gun =

US Navy shipboard and coastal defence gun

16"/50 caliber Mark 2 Gun
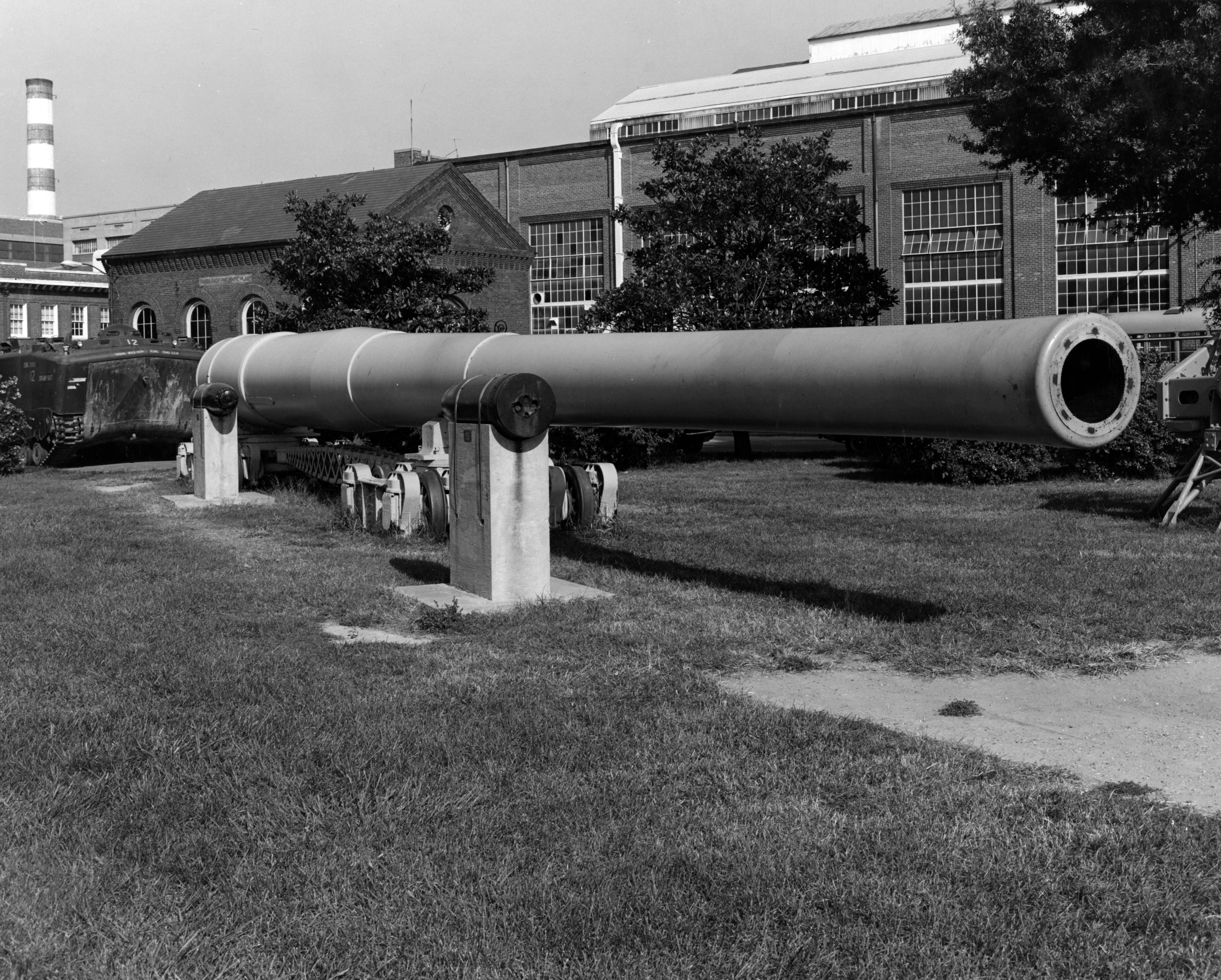
- 16"/50 Mark 2 gun on display at the Washington Navy Yard.
- Type: Naval gun; Coastal defense gun
- Place of origin: United States

Service history
- In service: 1924–47 as coastal defense gun
- Used by: United States Navy; United States Army
- Wars: World War II

Production history
- Designed: 1916
- Manufacturer: Naval Gun Factory; Bethlehem Steel; and others
- Produced: 1917–22
- No. built: 71
- Variants: Marks 2 and 3 Mods 0 and 1

Specifications
- Mass: 284,000 pounds (129,000 kg)
- Length: 68 feet 0 inches (20.73 m) (without breech)
- Barrel length: 66 feet 8 inches (20.32 m) bore (50 calibers)
- Shell: AP Mark 3: 2,110-pound (960 kg) armor-piercing (AP) (Naval); AP Mark 12: 2,240-pound (1,020 kg) AP (Army)
- Caliber: 16-inch (410 mm)
- Recoil: 49-inch (120 cm)
- Elevation: -4 to +40 degrees (turret); -7 to +65 degrees (casemate)
- Traverse: -145° to +145° (turret); 145° total (casemate)
- Rate of fire: 2 rounds per minute
- Muzzle velocity: AP Mark 3: 2,800 feet per second (853 m/s) (Naval charge); AP Mark 3: 2,750 feet per second (838 m/s) (Army charge); AP Mark 12: 2,650 feet per second (808 m/s) (Army charge)
- Effective firing range: 45,100 yd (41,200 m) at 46° elevation on coast defense mount

The 16"/50 caliber Mark 2 gun and the near-identical Mark 3 were guns originally designed and built for the United States Navy as the main armament for the South Dakota-class battleships and Lexington-class battlecruisers. The successors to the 16"/45 caliber gun Mark I gun, they were at the time among the heaviest guns built for use as naval artillery.

As part of the Washington Naval Treaty of 1922, both of these ship classes were cancelled part way through construction, rendering surplus about 70 examples of the 16-inch/50 which had already been built. Twenty were released to the United States Army, between 1922 and 1924, for use by the Coast Artillery Corps, the rest were kept in storage for future naval use. Only ten of the twenty available guns were deployed (in five two-gun batteries) prior to 1940.

When the design of the Iowa-class battleship began in 1938, it was initially assumed these ships would use the surplus guns. However, due to a miscommunication between the two Navy departments involved in the design, the ships required a lighter gun than the Mark 2/Mark 3, resulting, ultimately, in the design of the 267,900 lb (121,500 kg) 16"/50 caliber Mark 7 gun. In January 1941 all but three of the remaining fifty Mark 2 and Mark 3 guns were released to the Army. They were the primary armament of 21 two-gun batteries built in the United States and its territories during World War II. However, none of these were fired in battle.

== Development ==
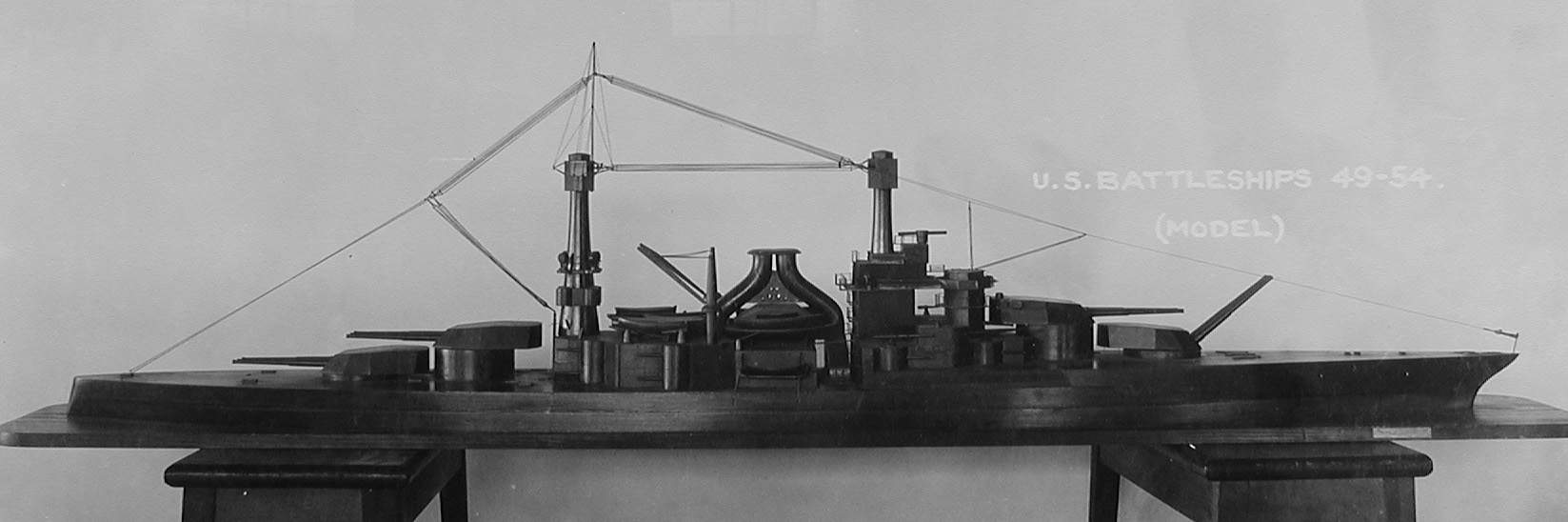
Model of the South Dakota-class battleship, including 12 16"/50 Mark 2 guns.

The first example of a US 16-inch gun was an Army weapon, the M1895, approved for construction in 1895 and completed in 1902; only one was built. The first US Navy 16-inch gun was the 16-inch/45 caliber Mark 1 gun, which armed the Colorado-class battleships launched 1920–21. The second Navy design, the Mark 2, was intended as armament for the planned South Dakota-class battleships, and also selected for the modified design of the Lexington-class battlecruisers, replacing the 14-inch/50 caliber gun that was originally used for the design. The Mark 3 was a slightly modified version of the Mark 2.

With the United States entering into the Washington Naval Treaty, the terms limited the United States to a maximum displacement of 35,000 long tons (36,000 t). As both the South Dakota-class battleships and Lexington-class battlecruisers exceeded this limit, the Navy was required to cancel their construction, doing so in 1922. While two of the Lexington class were re-ordered as Lexington-class aircraft carriers, none of them were completed with the barbettes necessary to mount these guns. Construction of the 16-inch Mark 2 and Mark 3 guns was also cancelled with 70 completed, plus the prototype, Gun No. 42. Twenty of the existing guns were transferred to the Army in 1922 to supplement the Army's more massive and much more expensive 16-inch gun M1919, of which only seven were ever deployed. The remaining Mk2/Mk3 guns were retained for use on future warships. With funding lacking until 1940, five batteries of two Mk2/Mk3 guns each were built 1924–40 in the harbor defenses of Pearl Harbor, the Panama Canal Zone (Pacific side), and San Francisco. They were designated 16-inch Navy guns MkIIMI and MkIIIMI in Army service. A version of the M1919 barbette mount used for the M1919 guns was used for these batteries, except at Fort Funston in San Francisco, where Battery Davis was the prototype for the M2 mount and casemating. Based on the Coast Artillery's experience operating heavy weapons in World War I, especially the French-made 400 mm (15.75 inch) Modèle 1916 railway howitzer, all barbette carriages for 16-inch guns were designed with an elevation of 65 degrees to allow plunging fire as enemy ships approached.

In 1938, with the signing of the Second London Naval Treaty, the tonnage limit for battleships was relaxed to 45,000 tons. After this, the U.S. Navy began design of a ship that would fit this higher tonnage limit, eventually resulting in the Iowa-class battleship. The larger size would allow for guns with a 16-inch caliber and a 50-caliber length, larger than the 16-inch/45 caliber Mark 6 guns used on the North Carolina- and South Dakota-class battleships. While the Iowa-class battleships were under construction, the Bureau of Ordnance assumed that the guns to be used would be the existing Mark 2 and 3 weapons, and through miscommunication, the Bureau of Construction and Repair assumed the ships would use a lighter design. As a result, the Mark 2 and 3 guns were not used for these, and the 16-inch/50 caliber Mark 7 gun was designed instead. The Mark 2 and 3 guns were never placed on any ship.

== Design ==
The 16-inch Mark 2 was 50 calibers long, with a liner, an A tube, jacket and seven hoops with four hoop locking rings and a screw box liner. The Mod 0 used an increasing twist in the rifling while the Mod 1 used a uniform twist and a different groove pattern. The Mark 3 was the same as the Mark 2 but used a one-step conical liner. The Mark 3 Mod 0 had an increasing rifling twist (like the Mark 2 Mod 0) while the Mark 3 Mod 1 utilized a uniform twist. At the time the program was cancelled, in 1922, 71 guns had been built, including the prototype, while another 44 were in progress.

A Mark 3 Mod 1 was modified and used as the prototype for the 16-inch/50 caliber Mark 7 gun, which would go on to arm the Iowa-class battleships; it was redesignated as Mark D Mod 0.

== Description ==
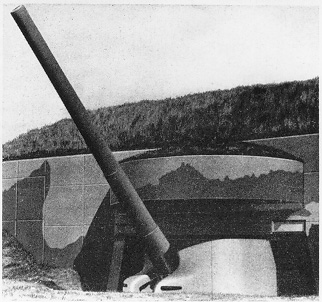
A casemated 16-inch gun. Almost all batteries were casemated by 1943.

These built-up guns were 66 feet 8 inches (20.32 m) long—50 times their 16-inch (406 mm) bore, or 50 calibers from breechface to muzzle. With a full powder charge of 700 pounds (320 kg), the guns were capable of firing a 2,110-pound (960 kg) Mark 3 armor-piercing shell with a muzzle velocity of 2,800 feet per second (850 m/s) firing out to an effective range of 44,680 yards (40,860 m). The Army used a reduced charge (672 pounds (305 kg) with Mark 3 shell or 648 pounds (294 kg) with Mark 12 shell) and either a 2,110-pound (960 kg) Mark 3 shell or a 2,240-pound (1,020 kg) Mark 12 shell, for a muzzle velocity of 2,750 feet per second (840 m/s) with the Mark 3 or 2,650 feet per second (810 m/s) with the Mark 12. The range for the Army version is listed as 45,150 yd (41,290 m) but it is not clear which shell and charge this is for.

== Service ==
With war on the horizon, the Navy released the approximately 50 remaining guns, and on 27 July 1940, in the wake of the Fall of France, the Army's Harbor Defense Board recommended the construction of twenty-seven 16-inch two-gun batteries to protect strategic points along the US coastline, to be casemated against air attack, as was begun with almost all of the older batteries. The M2 through M5 barbette mounts were used for the later batteries. As with the previous M1919 barbette carriage, these were designed with an elevation of 65 degrees to allow plunging fire as enemy ships approached. About twenty-one 16-inch gun batteries were completed at eleven harbor defense commands in 1941–44, but not all of these were armed.

Typical of this plan were the guns placed to protect Narragansett Bay, Rhode Island; two 16-inch guns in Battery Gray, Fort Church, Little Compton, Rhode Island, with two more in Battery Hamilton, Fort Greene, Point Judith, Narragansett, Rhode Island. A second battery of 16-inch guns at Fort Greene, Battery 109, had construction suspended in 1943 and never received guns. These batteries were placed such that they not only protected Narraganset Bay, but interdicted the main channels into Buzzards Bay and the east end of Long Island Sound.

By late 1943, the threat of a naval attack on the United States had diminished, and with two or four 16-inch guns in most harbor defenses, construction and arming of further batteries was suspended. As 16-inch guns and a companion improved 6-inch gun were emplaced, older weapons were scrapped. With the war over in 1945, most of the remaining coast defense guns, including the recently emplaced 16-inch weapons, were scrapped by 1948.

== Surviving examples ==
All but four of these guns were scrapped by 1950. One remaining piece is a Mark 3 (Bethlehem Steel No. 138) at Aberdeen Proving Ground, Aberdeen, Maryland, 39°29′22.9″N 76°08′21.6″W. Another is a Mark 2 (Naval Gun Factory No. 111) at the former Naval Gun Factory at the Washington Navy Yard, part of the Naval Historical Center museum collection. Two Mark 2 guns (Nos. 96 and 100) remain at the Naval Surface Warfare Center Dahlgren Division, Dahlgren, Virginia. Project HARP used some 16-inch, Mark II, Mod 1 barrels for high altitude projectile research. At least two of these barrels can be found at the abandoned Project HARP research site in Barbados, near the eastern end of Grantley Adams International Airport. Another complete HARP gun, made of two 16-inch barrels, is at Yuma Proving Ground, Arizona. Another survivor is the Fort Miles 16 inch mark 2 guns.

== Gallery ==
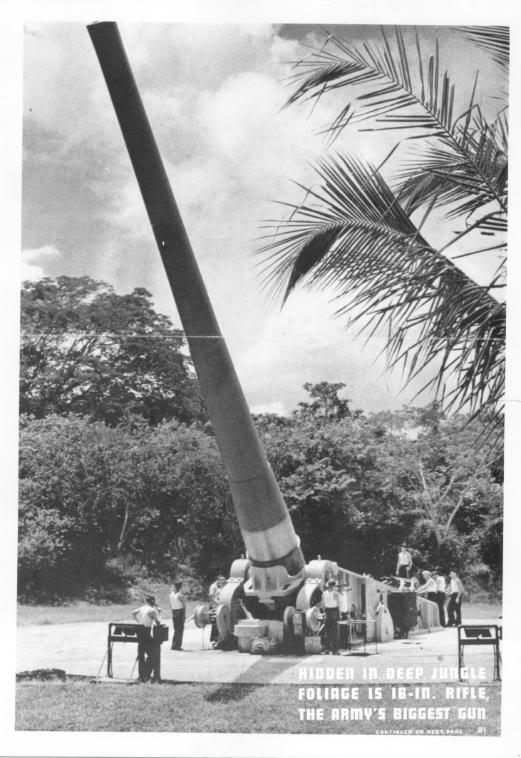
16-inch Navy MkIIMI gun on M1919 barbette mount, Fort Kobbe, Panama Canal Zone

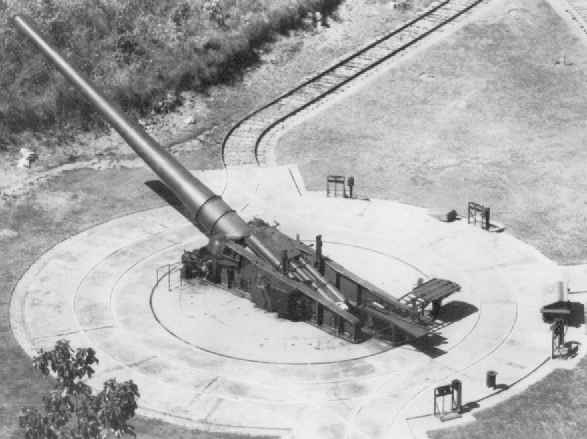
Aerial view of 16-inch Navy MkIIMI gun on M1919 barbette mount, Fort Kobbe, Panama Canal Zone

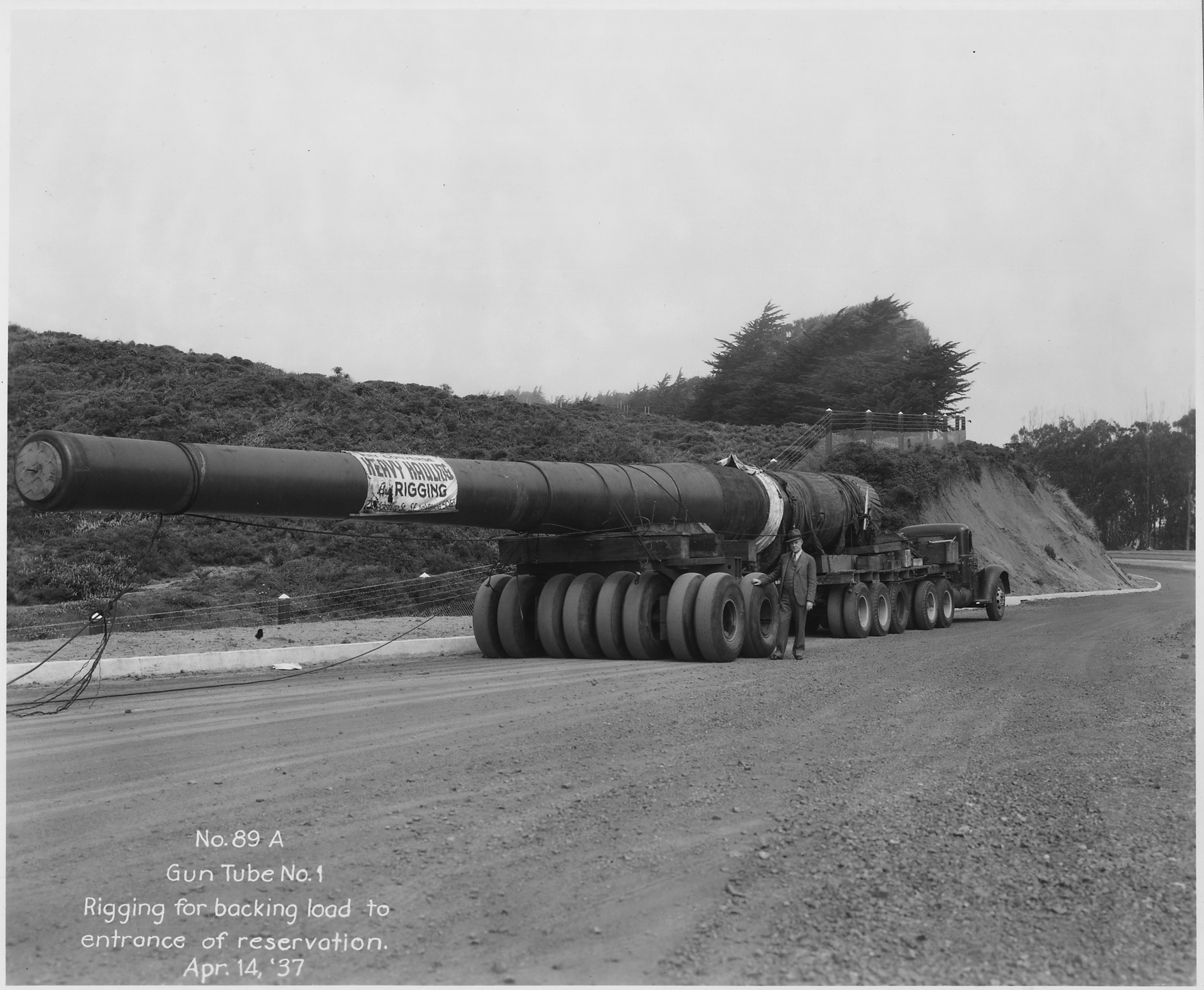
A 16-inch gun on the road to Fort Funston, San Francisco

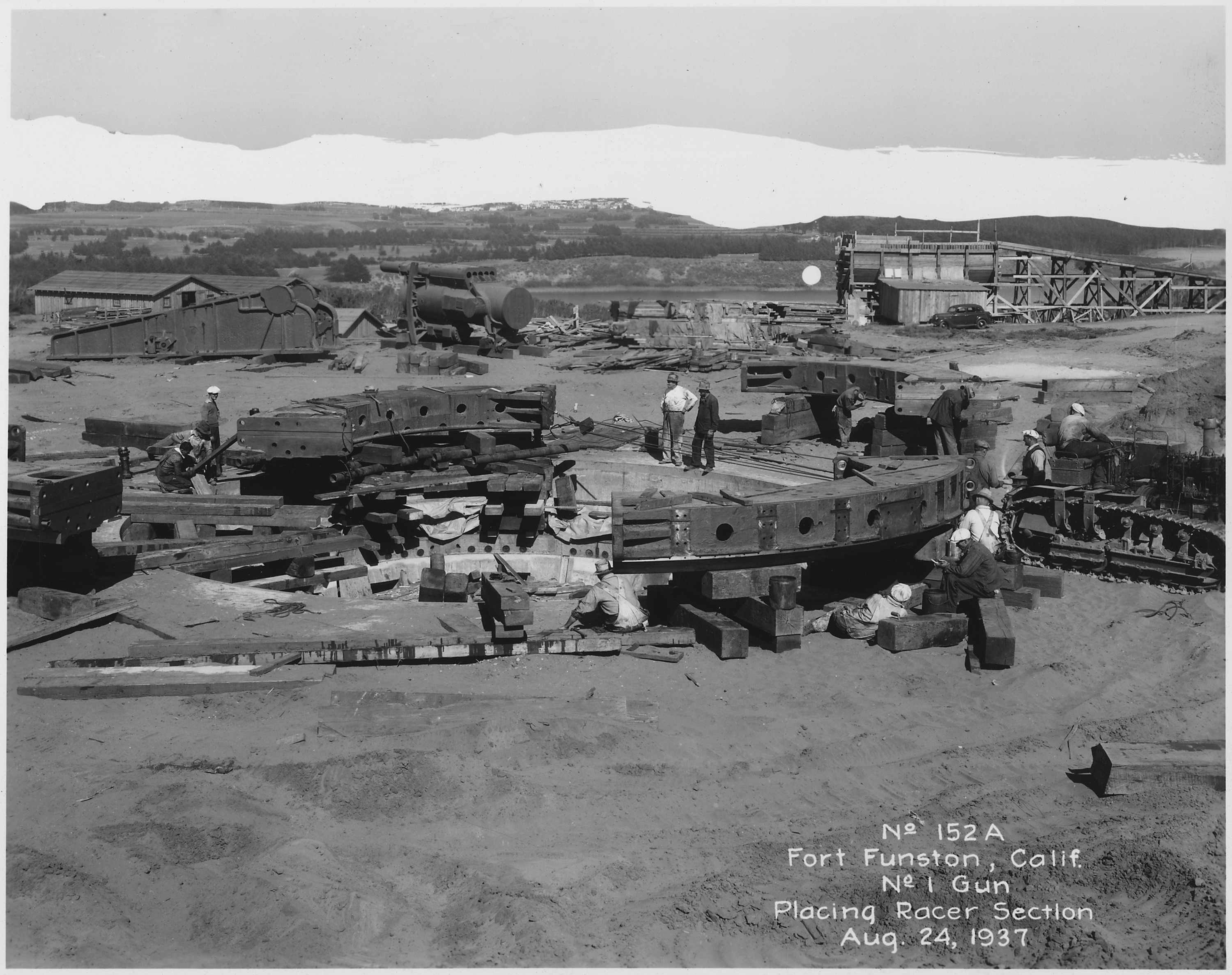
Assembling a 16-inch M2 gun carriage at Fort Funston

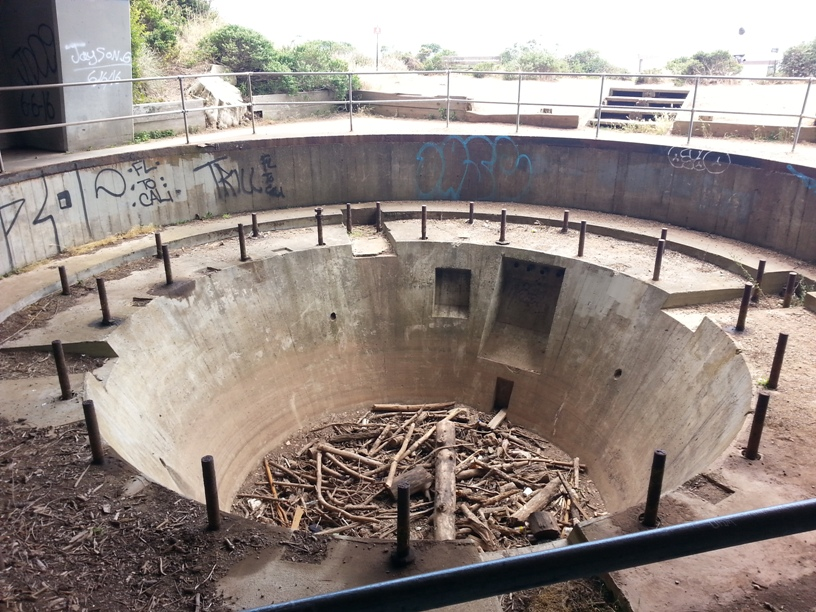
16-inch gun pit, Battery 129, Fort Barry, Marin Headlands, California

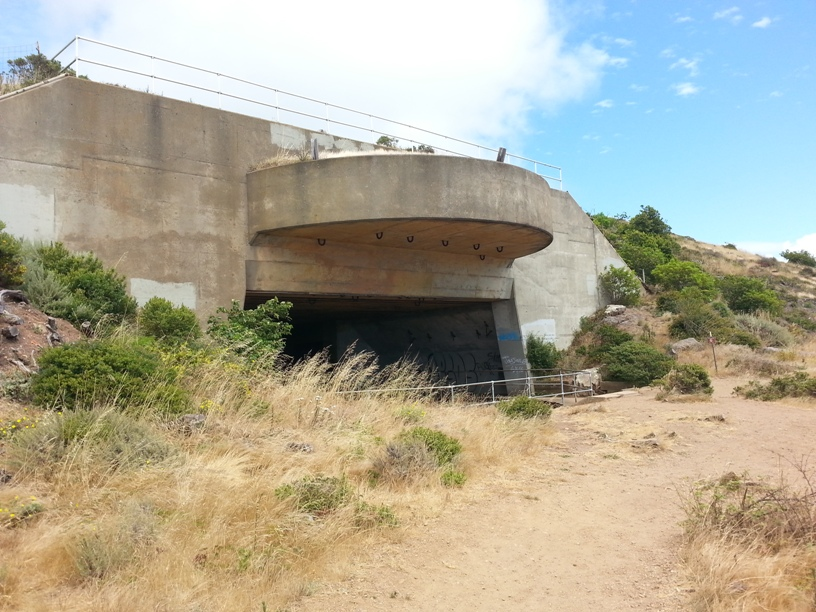
Casemated 16-inch gun emplacement, Battery 129, Fort Barry, Marin Headlands, California

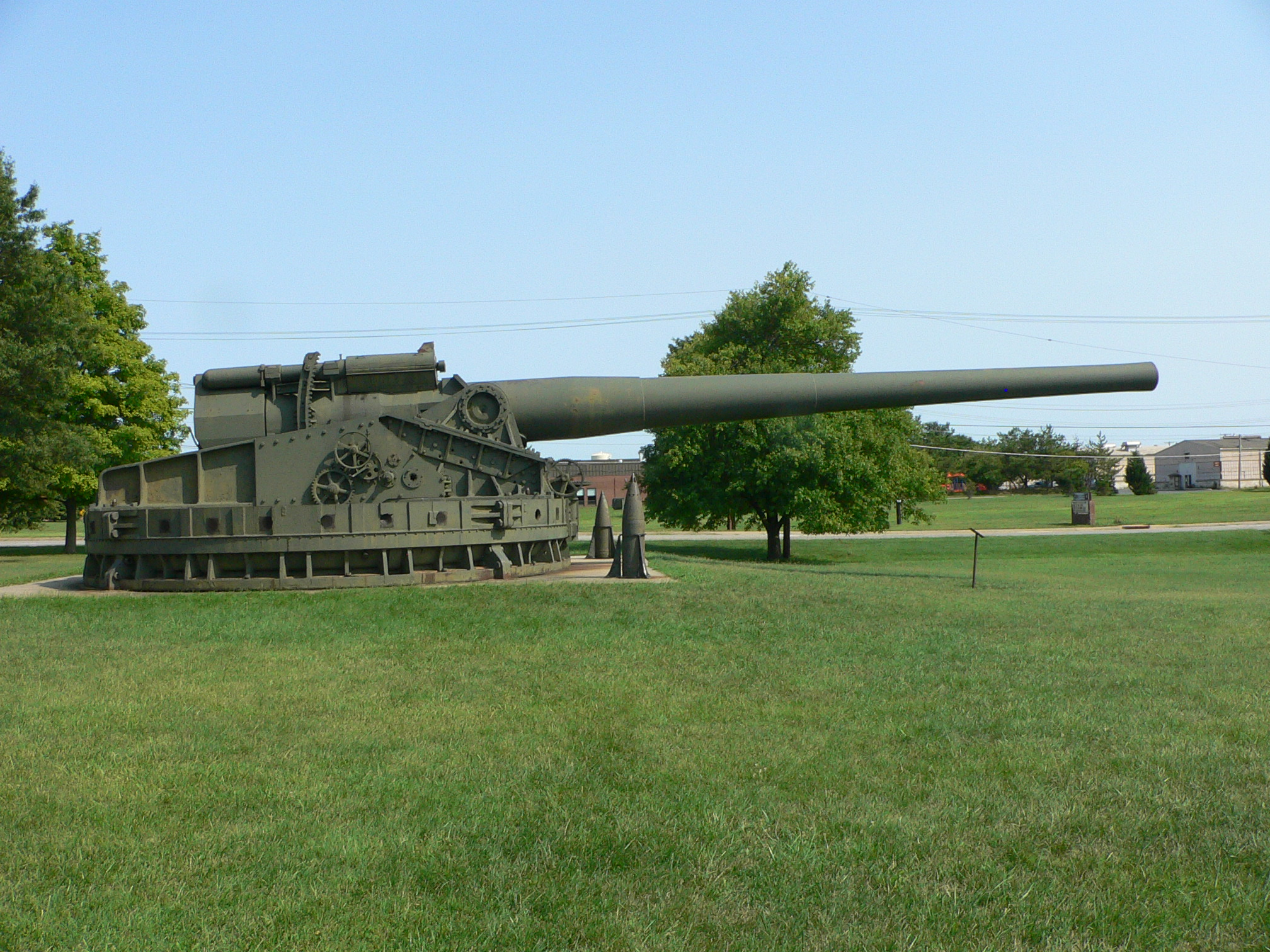
16-inch/50 caliber Mark 3 gun on proof mounting, Aberdeen Proving Ground, Maryland

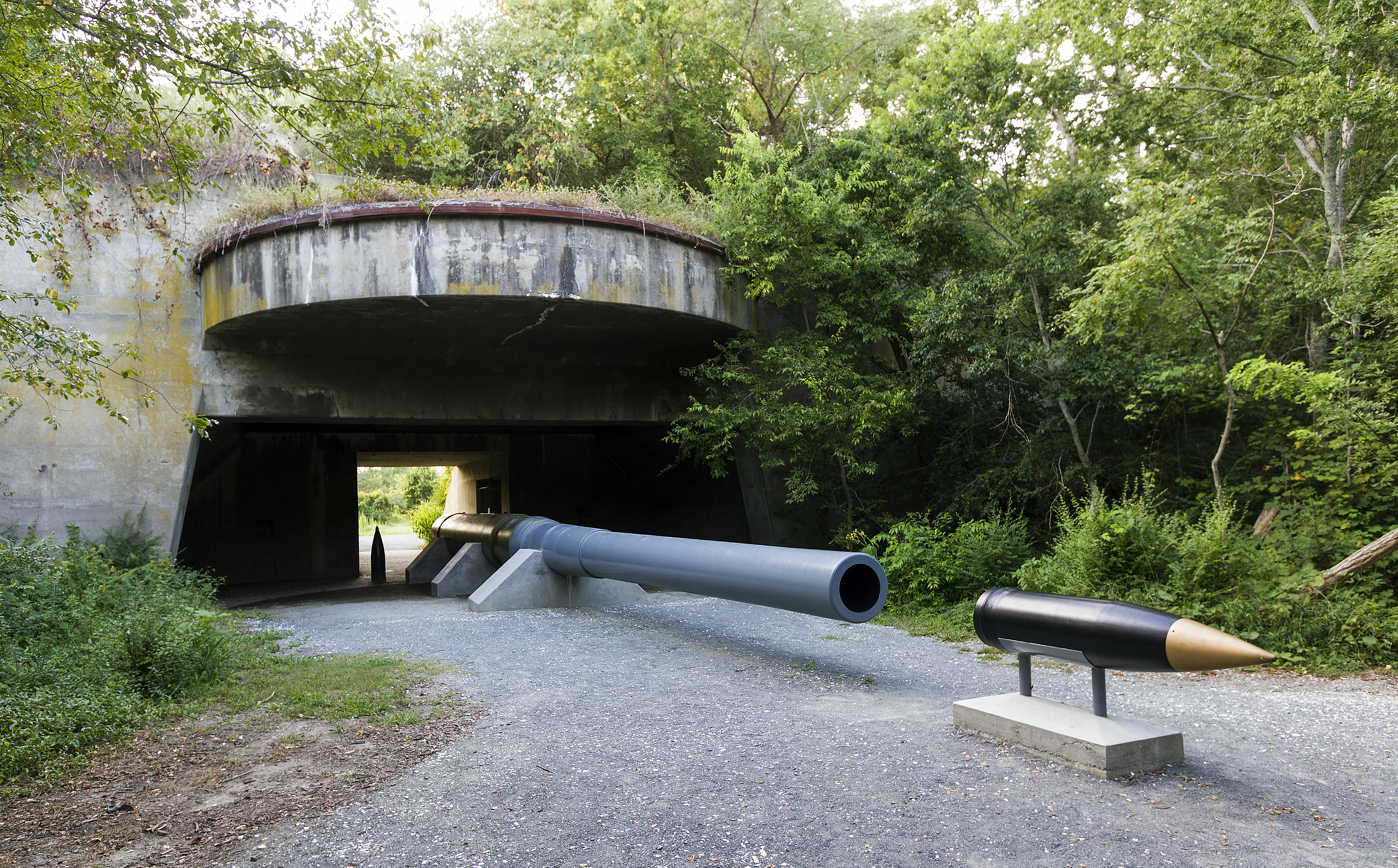
16-inch/50 caliber Mark 7 gun and shell in front of a World War II emplacement for Mark 2 guns at Fort John Custis (aka Cape Charles Air Force Station), Virginia

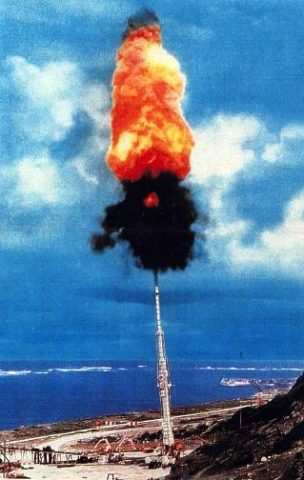
Barbados Project HARP gun firing

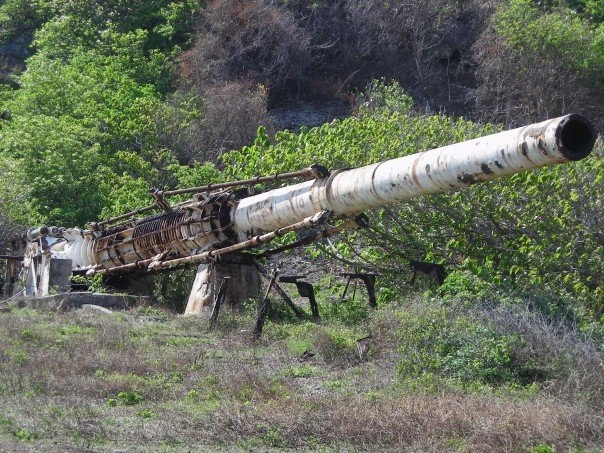
Abandoned Barbados PROJECT HARP Gun

== See also ==
- 16"/50 caliber Mark 7 gun : successor
- 16"/50 caliber M1919 gun : purpose-built United States Army coast defense gun
- List of the largest cannon by caliber
- Seacoast defense in the United States
