= 16-inch/50-caliber M1919 gun =

16-inch gun M1919
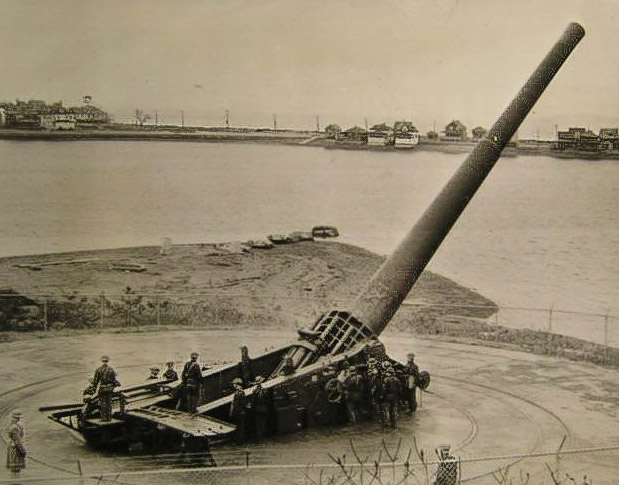
- 16-inch gun M1919 on barbette mount M1919, Fort Duvall, Boston, Massachusetts.
- Type: Coastal Artillery
- Place of origin: United States

Service history
- In service: 1920–1946
- Used by: United States Army Coast Artillery Corps
- Wars: World War II

Production history
- Designer: US Army Ordnance Corps
- Manufacturer: Watervliet Arsenal

Specifications
- Mass: 484 tons
- Barrel length: 50 calibers, 66 ft 8 in (20.32 m)
- Shell: AP: 2,340 lb (1,060 kg) or 2,100 lb (950 kg); 850 lb powder charge
- Caliber: 16 in (406 mm)
- Carriage: M1919 Barbette or M1917 disappearing, both fixed
- Elevation: -7° to +65° (-5° to +30° disappearing carriage)
- Traverse: 360° (open and disappearing), 145° (casemated)
- Muzzle velocity: 2,700 ft/s (823 m/s)
- Maximum firing range: 49,100 yd (44,900 m) 27.9 miles (less with disappearing carriage)

The 16 inch gun M1919 (406 mm) was a large coastal artillery piece installed to defend the United States' major seaports between 1920 and 1946. It was operated by the United States Army Coast Artillery Corps. Only a small number were produced and only seven were mounted; in 1922 and 1940 the US Navy surplussed a number of their own 16-inch/50 guns, which were mated to modified M1919 carriages and filled the need for additional weapons.

== History ==
The first US 16-inch (406 mm) gun, a coastal artillery weapon, started construction in 1895 at Watervliet Arsenal. It was known as the M1895 and completed in 1902; only one was built. It was mounted on a disappearing carriage in Fort Grant on the Pacific side of the Panama Canal Zone in 1914, where it served until scrapped in 1943. The weapon's muzzle section was displayed at the Watervliet Arsenal museum, which closed in 2013.

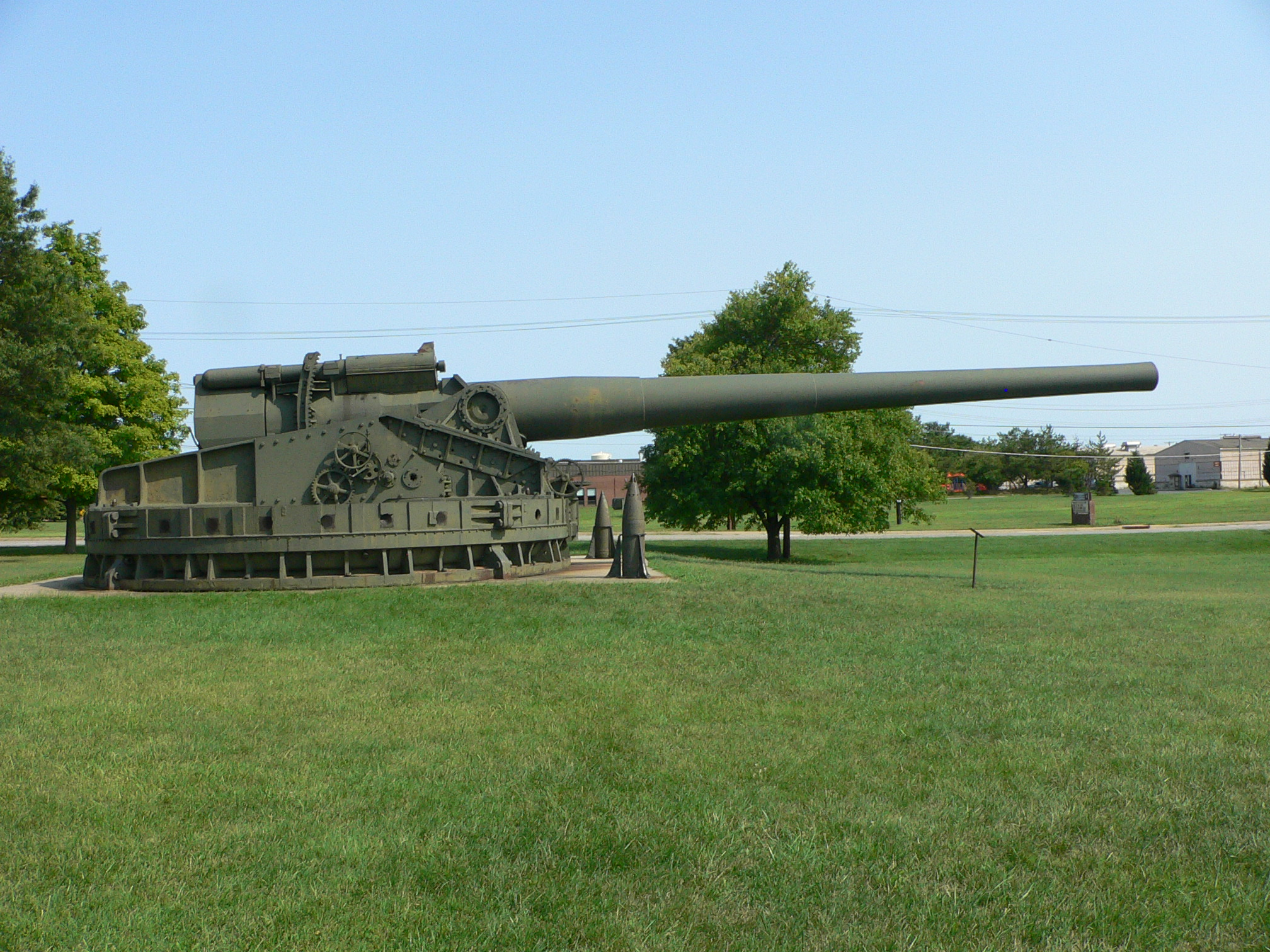
16 in Mark III coastal defense gun on a proof mount at Aberdeen Proving Ground, Maryland.

The second 16-inch (406 mm) gun was the United States Army 50 caliber Model 1919 (M1919). The first of these was deployed to Fort Michie, Great Gull Island, New York on a unique all-around-fire M1917 disappearing carriage, with elevation increased from 15° to 30°. An additional six of the Army-designed M1919 guns were built and deployed by 1927 in two-gun batteries on barbette carriages in the harbor defenses of Boston (Fort Duvall), New York City (Fort Tilden), and Pearl Harbor, Hawaii (Fort Weaver). The 16-inch gun M1919 was built using the wire-wound method, common in Europe but rare in the United States. Based on the Coast Artillery's experience operating heavy weapons in World War I, especially the French-made 400 mm (15.75 inch) Modèle 1916 railway howitzer, the M1919 barbette carriage was designed with an elevation of 65° to allow plunging fire as enemy ships approached.

In 1922, the terms of the Washington Naval Treaty caused the US Navy to cancel the South Dakota-class battleships and the Lexington-class battlecruisers, surplusing 16-inch/50 caliber Mark II and Mark III barrels. Initially, 20 guns were transferred to the Army, which built a new version of the M1919 mount for the naval guns. With funding lacking until 1940, five batteries of two guns each were built 1924–40 in the harbor defenses of Pearl Harbor, Panama (Pacific side), and San Francisco. In 1940 a near-fiasco was experienced in designing the Iowa-class battleships, and a new gun, the 16"/50 caliber Mark 7 gun, had to be designed for them, as they could not accommodate the Mark 2 and Mark 3 guns. With war on the horizon, the Navy released the approximately 50 remaining guns, and on 27 July 1940 the Army's Harbor Defense Board recommended the construction of 27 16-inch two-gun batteries to protect strategic points along the US coastline, all to be casemated against air attack, as were almost all of the older 16-inch batteries by this time.

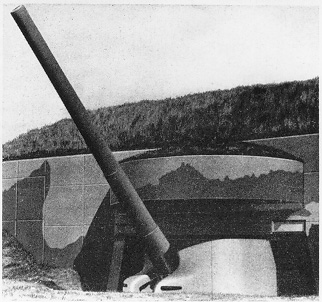
A casemated 16-inch gun. Almost all batteries were casemated by 1940, including the M1919 gun batteries in New York and near Boston.

Typical of this plan were the guns placed to protect Narragansett Bay; two 16-inch guns in Battery Gray, Fort Church, Little Compton, Rhode Island, with two more in Battery Hamilton, Fort Greene, Point Judith, Narragansett, Rhode Island. A second battery of 16-inch guns at Fort Greene, Battery 109, had construction suspended in 1943 and never received guns. These batteries were placed such that they not only protected Narraganset Bay, but interdicted the main channels into Buzzards Bay and the east end of Long Island Sound.

By late 1943, the threat of a naval attack on the United States had diminished, and with two or four 16-inch guns in most harbor defenses, construction and arming of further batteries was suspended. As 16-inch guns and a companion improved 6-inch gun were emplaced, older weapons were scrapped. About 21 16-inch gun batteries were completed 1941–44, but not all of these were armed. With the war over in 1945, most of the remaining coast defense guns, including the recently emplaced 16-inch weapons, were scrapped by 1948.

== Specifications ==
The gun fired a 2,340 lb (1,060 kg). projectile to a range of 26 miles (42 km). The estimated cost of the gun and barbette was $520,000 in 1938. The new M1 Gun Data Computer was used in directing these guns.

== See also ==
- 16"/50 caliber Mark 2 gun: similar US Navy gun also deployed for coast defense
- List of the largest cannon by caliber
- Seacoast defense in the United States

== General references ==
- TM 9-2300 Standard Artillery and Fire Control Materiel FEB. 1944
- TM 4-210 Seacoast Artillery Weapons Oct. 1944
- FM 4-85, Service of the Piece, 16-inch gun and howitzer
- TM 9–471
- SNL E-10
- SNL E-20
- SNL E-58
- American Coast Artillery Materiel 1922 (extensive manufacturing information)
