= M1895 =

M1895, or Model of 1895, can refer to:

- Nagant M1895 - a revolver
- Steyr-Mannlicher M1895 - an Austrian bolt-action rifle
- M1895 Lee Navy - an American bolt-action rifle
- Winchester Model 1895 - a lever-action rifle
- M1895 Colt–Browning machine gun - a machine gun
- 10-inch gun M1895 - a U.S. Army coast artillery piece
- 12-inch gun M1895 - a U.S. Army coast artillery piece
- 16-inch gun M1895 - a U.S. Army coast artillery piece
