= Lexington-class battlecruiser =

Abortive WWI-era battlecruiser class of the U.S. Navy

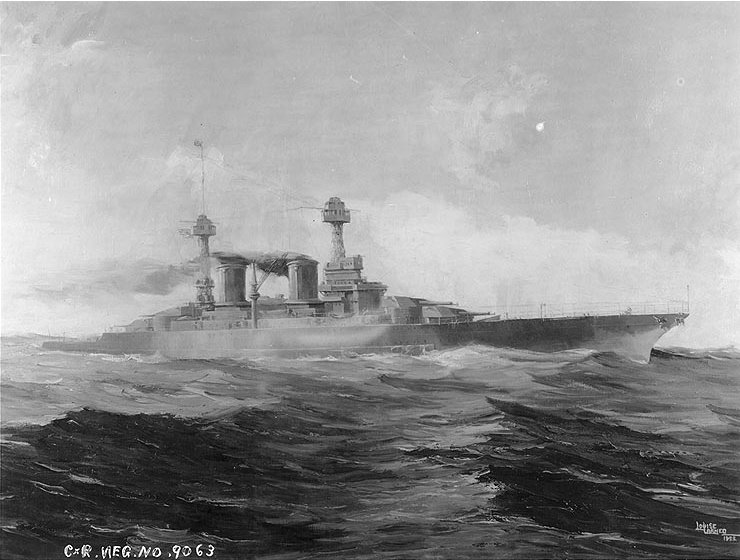
- A 1922 painting by Louise Larned depicting the definitive design of the Lexington class, with eight 16-inch (406 mm)/50 cal guns and two funnels

Class overview
- Builders: Fore River Shipbuilding, New York Shipbuilding and Newport News Shipbuilding and Drydock Company
- Operators: United States Navy
- Preceded by: None
- Planned: 6
- Completed: 2, converted to aircraft carriers
- Canceled: 4

General characteristics
- Type: Battlecruiser
- Displacement: 43,500 long tons (44,200 t); 44,638 long tons (45,354 t) deep load
- Length: 874 ft (266.4 m) overall
- Beam: 105 ft 4 in (32.1 m)
- Draft: 31 ft (9.4 m)
- Installed power: 180,000 shp (130,000 kW); 16 water-tube boilers
- Propulsion: four shafts; Turbo-electric drive
- Speed: 33 knots (61 km/h; 38 mph)
- Range: 10,000 nmi (19,000 km; 12,000 mi) at 10 knots (19 km/h; 12 mph)
- Complement: 1297 (1326 as flagship)
- Armament: 4 × twin 16-inch (406 mm) guns; 16 × single 6-inch (152 mm) guns; 4 (later 8) × single 3-inch (76 mm) AA guns; 8 × 21-inch (533 mm) torpedo tubes
- Armor: Belt: 5–7 in (127–178 mm); Barbettes: 5–9 in (127–229 mm); Turret face: 11 in (279 mm); Turret sides: 6 in (152 mm); Conning tower: 12 in (305 mm); Deck: 1.5–2.25 in (38–57 mm)

The Lexington-class battlecruisers were officially the only class of battlecruiser to ever be ordered by the United States Navy. (Note: The Lexington class were the only class of U.S. Navy ships to be officially designated to as battlecruisers. The World War II-era Alaska class, were officially classified as "large cruisers", although some modern historians have classified them as battlecruisers. The design of the Alaskas owed little to the Lexington class or other true battlecruisers, instead using a scaled-up Baltimore-class heavy cruiser with the machinery of an Essex-class aircraft carrier.) While these six vessels were requested in 1911 as a reaction to the building by Japan of the Kongō class, the potential use for them in the U.S. Navy came from a series of studies by the Naval War College which stretched over several years and predated the existence of the first battlecruiser, HMS Invincible (a series of proposed battlecruiser designs was in fact submitted to the General Board in 1909 but was not approved for construction). The fact they were not approved by Congress at the time of their initial request was due to political, not military, considerations.

The Lexingtons were included as part of the Naval Act of 1916. Like the South Dakota-class battleships also included in the 1916 Act, their construction was repeatedly postponed in favor of escort ships and anti-submarine vessels. During these delays, the class was redesigned several times; they were originally designed to mount ten 14-inch guns and eighteen five-inch guns on a hull with a maximum speed of 35 knots (65 km/h; 40 mph), but by the time of the definitive design, these specifications had been altered to eight 16-inch guns and sixteen six-inch guns, with a speed of 33.25 knots (61.58 km/h; 38.26 mph) to improve hitting power and armor (the decrease in speed was mostly attributed to the additions of armor).

The design challenges the Navy's Bureau of Construction and Repair (C&R) faced with this class were considerable, as the combined requirements of optimum hitting power, extreme speed and adequate protection taxed the knowledge of its naval architects and the technology of the time. The desired speed of 35 knots had been attained previously only in destroyers and smaller craft. To do so with a capital ship required a hull and a power plant of unprecedented size for a U.S. naval vessel and careful planning on the part of its designers to ensure it would have enough longitudinal strength to withstand bending forces underway and the added stresses on its structure associated with combat. Even so, it took years between initial and final designs for engine and boiler technology to provide a plant of sufficient power that was also compact enough to allow a practical degree of protection, even in such large ships.

While four of the ships were eventually canceled and scrapped on their building ways in 1922 to comply with the Washington Naval Treaty, two (Lexington and Saratoga) were converted into the United States' first fleet carriers. (Note: The U.S. Navy's first aircraft carrier was Langley, but she was never more than an experimental ship because she was too slow—at a top speed of 15.5 knots (28.7 km/h; 17.8 mph), she was not able to keep pace with any escorts including the slow battleships.) Both saw extensive action in World War II, with Lexington conducting a number of raids before being sunk during the Battle of the Coral Sea and Saratoga serving in multiple campaigns in the Pacific and the Indian Ocean. Though she was hit by torpedoes on two different occasions, Saratoga survived the war only to be sunk as a target ship during Operation Crossroads. (Note: For more information, see the entries for Saratoga and Lexington in the Dictionary of American Naval Fighting Ships: "Lexington" and "Saratoga")

== Background ==
=== Armor or speed ===
As early as 1903, questions arose in the Naval War College (NWC) about the overall effectiveness of large armored cruisers such as the Pennsylvania- and Tennessee-class vessels just then coming into service. The NWC's 1903 annual summer conference report, which included a staff memorandum on all-big-gun capital ships, also suggested a new type of cruiser that would be armed and armored much like a battleship. The following year, the summer conference considered tactics for a ship armed with four 12-inch (305 mm), twenty-two 3-inch (76 mm) guns, four submerged torpedo tubes and battleship-type protection. Ships such as these were essentially Tennessee-class ships in which the 6-inch (150 mm) intermediate battery had been traded for heavier main guns and protection. These ships figured in the college's studies for several years, and its 1906 summer conference report on a US building program strongly advocated the ships' construction for use in scouting and as fast wings in a fleet action, and for their resistance to 12-inch gunfire (much greater than the Tennessee class). Although the General Board and the Secretary of the Navy refused to adopt the proposed new armored cruiser, perhaps because the Navy already had 10 new armored cruisers on hand, the college continued to test the design against a variety of foreign vessels, including the British Invincible-class battlecruiser.

By 1908, the summer conference had come to favor battlecruisers over armored cruisers. The increasing range of torpedoes and the distances at which future gun battles were expected to be fought seemed to favor speed over armor. Gunnery officers "laid great stress upon the value of getting the range first and then smothering, or beating down, the enemy's fire before he gets the range." The conference concluded that battlecruisers would be worth building, with the caveat that they be considered in the same category as armored cruisers, in support of the battle fleet but not to fight in the line with fully armored battleships. A majority report recommended a top speed of at least 20 percent above that of battleships. As U.S. battleships then being built were expected to steam at 21 knots (39 km/h; 24 mph), this meant a minimum speed for battlecruisers of 25.4 knots (47.0 km/h; 29.2 mph). The Bureau of Construction and Repair (C&R) sketched out such ships the following year, at the request of the Secretary of the Navy, as fast equivalents of the Wyoming-class ships being considered. By adopting a 670-foot (204 m) hull on a displacement of 26,000 long tons (26,417 t), it could produce a vessel that could travel at 25.5 knots (47.2 km/h; 29.3 mph) and carry eight 50-caliber 12-inch guns in four twin turrets and equivalent armor; the savings in weight from eliminating two of the Wyomings' six turrets more than balanced the added length and height of the armor belt. An enlarged belt was required by a deeper hull, as all American battlecruiser studies required deep hulls to retain their girder strength because those hulls had to be abnormally long to attain their speed. If the armor belt were reduced by an average of three inches, a fifth turret could be added. Four intermediate proposals included one with intermediate armor and eight 12-inch guns and one with Wyoming armor and six 12-inch guns. None of these designs included superfiring turrets. The General Board retained these sketches but did not recommend construction.

=== Pacific developments ===
As the NWC continued its studies, the Imperial Japanese Navy (IJN) scored a decisive victory over the Russian Baltic Fleet at the Battle of Tsushima in 1905. Japan had already been a concern of the U.S. Navy. Strategist and Admiral Alfred Thayer Mahan had warned then-Assistant Secretary of the Navy Theodore Roosevelt in 1897 of a much greater likelihood of conflict in the Pacific than in the Atlantic. Roosevelt himself, as President of the United States, had written before Tsushima to British diplomat Cecil Spring Rice, "The Japs interest me and I like them. I am perfectly well aware that if they win out it may possibly mean a struggle between them and us in the future." Tsushima sealed the outcome of the Russo-Japanese War in Japan's favor, signaled its emergence as a world power and began a period of rivalry with the United States over intentions in the Pacific theater, as the two now became the dominant military powers there. An immediate consequence was the four Tsukuba-class armored cruisers, laid down between 1905 and 1908. These ships were designed to carry four 12-inch (305 mm) guns, a size generally allocated to capital ships and unprecedented for armored cruisers. They would be protected with 8 inches (203 mm) of belt and turret armour and 3 inches (76 mm) of deck armour and be capable of a speed of 20.5 knots. The Tsukubas were intended to take the place of aging battleships and thus showed Japan's intention of continuing to use armored cruisers in fleet engagements. They were also exactly the type of ships for which the college had argued unsuccessfully to add to the U.S. Navy before switching to battlecruisers.

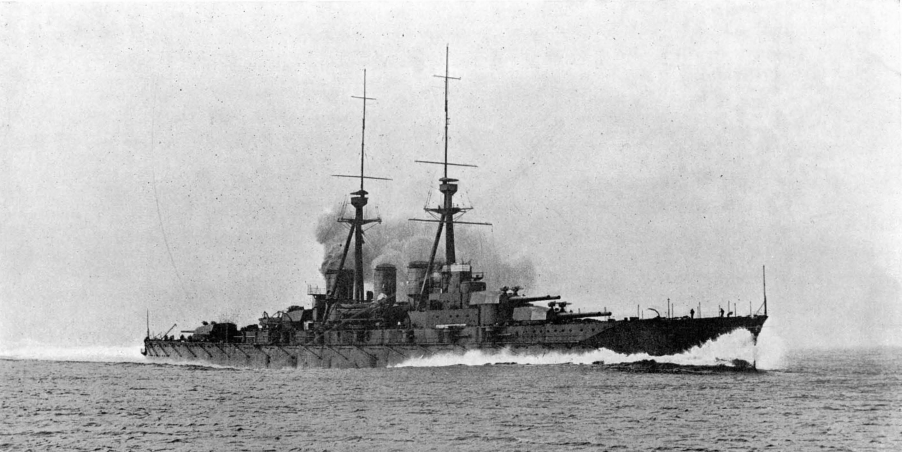
IJN battlecruiser Kongō, for which the Lexington class was to be a response

Therefore, while the Navy did not react as Germany and Britain built increasing numbers of battlecruisers, it took a very different tack when Japan laid down its first ship of this class, Kongō, in Britain on 17 January 1911. On 13 June, U.S. Naval Intelligence confirmed she was to be the first of four ships, the other three to be built in Japan, which would form a fast division for the IJN. The following day, the Secretary of the Navy asked the General Board to consider the construction of American battlecruisers for Pacific service, as the Pennsylvanias and Tennessees would no longer be viable units in the face of such opposition. The General Board, not willing to forego battleship construction in favor of auxiliary types such as battlecruisers, balked. On 29 August, it suggested that C&R research a ship under 30,000 tons that could steam at 29 knots (54 km/h), carry eight 14-inch (356 mm) and twenty-four 5-inch (127 mm) guns and have a protective system comparable to the Nevada-class battleships. In other words, the board requested an American version of the Kongō. (Note: The Kongōs would be cited a second time, almost 30 years later and this time by the General Board, as reason to build the Iowa-class fast battleships (Friedman (1985), p. 307).)

In view of the board's lack of urgency, C&R took nearly a year to research this project. The proposed main battery of eight 14-inch guns was kept constant while other factors were calculated—speeds of 26, 29 and 32 knots; operating ranges of 5000, 7000 and 8000 miles; and belt armor of 8, 11 and 14 inches. On 12 July 1912, Naval Constructor R.H. Robinson presented these studies at a lecture he gave at the Naval War College with the General Board in attendance. There, he emphasized 8 inches as an absolute minimum for armor protection and recommended a radius of 8000 miles, the same as in U.S. battleships. The General Board's reaction was to request two battlecruisers for the 1914 Naval Building Program and ask C&R for a slightly modified version of the proposed ship, but the Naval War College felt the design had serious problems and that a fast battleship would be a more practical option.

There was also the political climate to consider—and the weather was not good for battlecruisers. Just as it was thought that Congress would not approve any battlecruisers without reducing the number of battleships, the Navy decided that battleships, such as the new "super-dreadnought" Nevada class whose construction had just begun, were more important since Congress—in the Navy's eyes—was not approving enough battleships. In 1903 the General Board assumed that the U.S. would build two battleships per year, but Congress "balked", approving just one ship in 1904 (fiscal year 1905), two ships in 1905 (FY 1906), one ship in both 1906 and 1907 (FY 1907–1908), and one ship in both 1912 and 1913 (FY 1913–1914). The approval of two New York-class ships in 1910 (FY 1911) instead of just one was apparently "something of a personal triumph for Secretary of the Navy von Lengerke Meyer."

Five years later—with World War I raging in Europe—the political climate had changed. A tentative five-year program put together in October and supported by President Woodrow Wilson called for ten battleships, six battlecruisers and ten destroyers to be completed by 1922. This was submitted to Congress in December 1915. On 2 June 1916, the House of Representatives passed the bill in a modified form, replacing five of the battleships with battlecruisers. On 29 August 1916, the Senate also passed an altered bill, keeping the original number of ships but stipulating that the program be completed in three years (FY 1917–19). The first four ships were paid for in FY 1917, the fifth in FY 1918, and the last in FY 1919.

The Lexingtons, along with the Omaha and Wickes classes, were intended to be part of a 35-knot (40 mph) scouting force that would support a large battle fleet, but the battlecruisers' keel laying was delayed; capital ship construction had been suspended in favor of needed merchant ships and anti-submarine warfare destroyers.

The six Lexington-class ships were named Lexington, Constellation, Saratoga, Ranger, Constitution, and United States and were designated CC-1 through CC-6, (Note: This would be similar to the U.S.'s use of "BB" for battleships and "CV" for aircraft carriers, among many other designations. See Hull classification symbol.) with "CC" signifying their status as battlecruisers. (Note: The designation "CC" was later revived for the "command ship" USS Northampton (CLC-1).) Although the class was planned to be the U.S.'s first battlecruisers, it was not of a new design; instead, it expanded upon already-existing 10,000–14,000 ton cruiser designs.

== Design development ==
In their original 1916 configuration, the battlecruisers were to carry ten 14"/50 caliber guns in four turrets, with two triple superfiring over two dual because there was not enough beam to accommodate the larger barbettes of the triple turrets slight further forward and aft. They would have a secondary armament of eighteen 5"/51 caliber guns on a displacement of 34,300 long tons (34,900 t) and steam at 35 knots. All of these specifications were tempered by their sparse armor compared with contemporary battleships. C&R estimated 180,000 shaft horsepower would be needed to obtain this planned speed. This would require 24 boilers, which became problematic, as there was not enough room for the boilers under the armored deck in such a long, comparatively narrow hull. The solution decided upon was to place half of the boilers above the deck on the centerline with armored boxes fitted around each one. There was also the challenge of the many exhaust uptakes needed. The Lexingtons were given "no less than" seven funnels, four of them side by side.

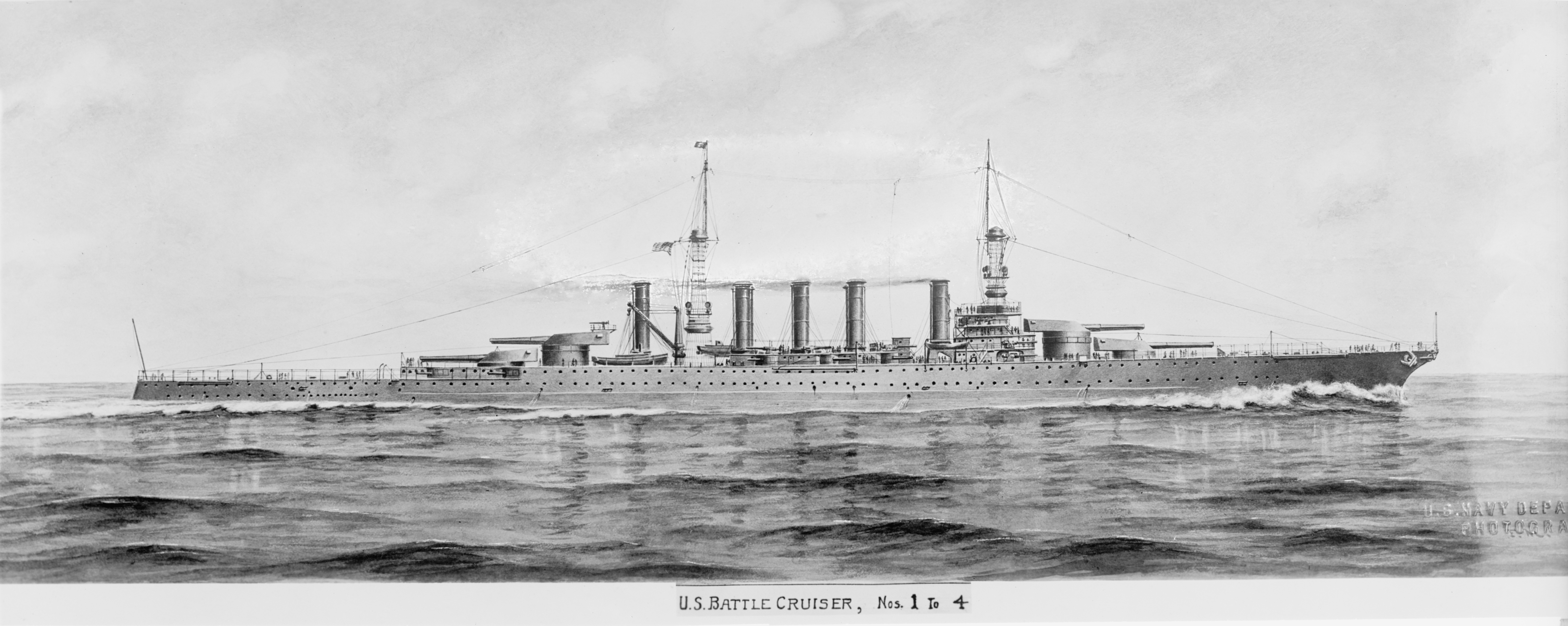
A painting of the Lexington class' original planned configuration

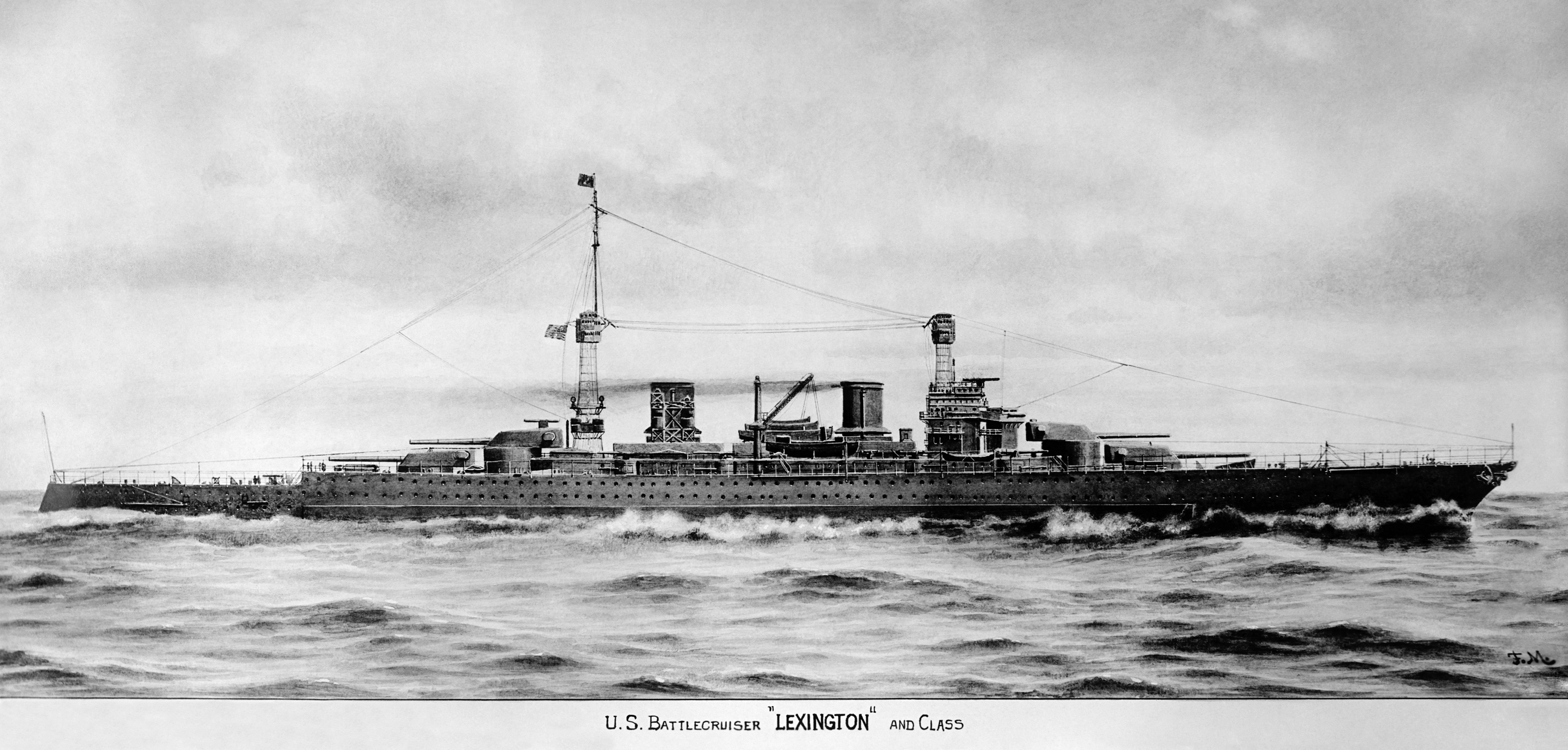
A painting that depicts the Lexington class' definitive design, 1919

Also, with such a long, narrow hull came a consequent penchant for bending, which led to the challenge of adequate hull strength, especially longitudinal strength. This challenge was complicated in a capital ship by the heavy weight of main turrets and guns. This was an area in which British battlecruisers were notably deficient. Structural members on HMS Invincible were so weak that her double-bottom frames distorted. HMS Renown had to go into drydock immediately following her preliminary gunnery tests because the hull structure could not withstand the bending stresses from firing her forward main guns. When the "large light cruiser" HMS Courageous weathered a heavy gale during her initial trial run, a number of her outer hull plates were so distorted that they had to be removed, sent back to the foundry and renewed.

In the Lexingtons longitudinal strength was challenged further by the large amount of freeboard required at the forward section of the hull to keep the ships dry and maintain a high speed in various types of weather. Also, while the 8 inches (203 mm) of belt armor being considered was not an impressive amount in itself, the belt's running potentially along 80 percent of the waterline and covering the entire side amidships made the amount of armor protection impressive by European standards. Because of the difference in ultimate tensile strength between armor steel and hull steel, severe stresses on the hull were expected. These factors plus the ships' unusual length prompted Naval Constructor R. H. Robinson, who led the design group for the Lexingtons, to make careful analyses of strength, buoyancy and stresses expected in service. For instance, designers assumed customarily that a ship needed to withstand stresses caused by a wave of the ship's length with a ratio of height to length of 1:20. Robinson found a more reasonable ratio at 1:26 for the Lexingtons, which also promised considerable savings in weight.

One suggestion from C&R was to make the belt armor a load-bearing member by connecting plates end to end. This was found inordinately difficult to be practical and, while it would have added girder strength where most badly needed, was considered too radical a proposition to be truly safe. Another idea, subsequently adopted, was to design the forecastle to break abaft the turrets. The challenge then became to continue the longitudinal strength contributed by the armored deck past this point to the end of the stern. This became a difficult design problem, especially with the need to save weight wherever possible and the fact that light structural members combined with heavy armament weight had become a source of grief for the British. One proposed solution was to use a combination of three decks—a strength deck at the top of the hull, a protective deck which would rest atop the belt armor, 10 feet (3 m) above the waterline, and a splinter deck below that, just above the waterline. A third idea, also adopted, was to continue the longitudinal bulkhead between the protective and splinter decks down to the bottom of the ship to add strength. The severity of the strength and weight challenges necessitated a larger displacement of 33,000 tons and a hull of 850 feet (259.1 m) instead of 800 feet (243.8 m) to give enough internal volume to accommodate all the needed machinery. Even so, the size of the power plant meant pushing the main turrets further toward the ends of the ships, which increased hull stress. This was why the idea was adopted to place half the boilers above the armored deck.

== Construction hold and redesign ==
Plans to begin construction were placed on hold in 1917. Large numbers of anti-submarine warfare vessels and merchant ships were needed to ensure the safe passage of men and materiel to Europe during Germany's U-boat campaign and were given top priority. This opened the opportunity for a massive redesign, the need for which had become apparent in light of experience gained in the Battle of Jutland, fought shortly after the initial design for the Lexingtons had been approved and in which three British battlecruisers had been lost. The fact that the U.S. Navy misunderstood the essential points of the battle initially was shown by its ignoring the Lexingtons' staying power while increasing their main armament to eight 50-caliber 16-inch (406 mm) guns and their secondary armament to fourteen 6"/53 caliber guns. Other factors for this decision were the discovery of plans by Britain and Japan for new battlecruisers armed with 15-inch (381 mm) and 16-inch guns (respectively) and the recommendation of the Bureau of Ordnance to give these ships the ability "to inflict fatal damage on the enemy's most powerful vessels at a distance no less than that at which she can be reached by the heavy gunfire of these opponent battleships." Only 20 of a newer style of boiler were needed, few enough to fit below the armored deck, and the number of funnels was reduced to five. The armor scheme was not modified, as that would have compromised the longitudinal strength of the hull.

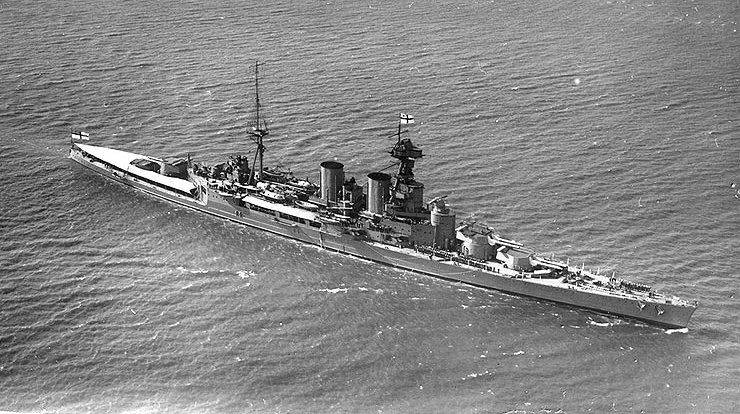
HMS Hood, which influenced the design of the Lexingtons

Around 1918, the U.S. naval staff in Great Britain became extremely impressed by the British's newest battlecruiser, HMS Hood of the Admiral class. Her side armor was comparable to that of previous battleships and her deck armor was the most extensive of any British capital ship. Because this ship was described as a "fast battleship" and the British Admiralty considered her a replacement for both the battleship and the battlecruiser, the staff advocated that the United States should develop a similar vessel of its own. Chief Constructor David Taylor agreed. On 8 April 1918, he told the Lexington design staff to plan a vessel combining the principal features of battleship and battlecruiser so that it would have the maximum possible speed, main armament and protection. Specifically, this meant arming her with the 16-inch guns planned for the South Dakota-class battleships, reducing armor protection 10 percent, a freeboard of at least 28 feet (8.5 m) (compared to 32 feet (9.8 m) for the 1917 battlecruiser and 29 feet (8.8 m) for the Hood) and a speed of at least 30 knots. Moreover, designs were to be prepared and submitted quickly.

The Royal Navy temporarily assigned a young constructor, Stanley Goodall, to C&R to assist in this task. Goodall brought a copy of the plans of Hood and accurate accounts of shell damage at the Battle of Jutland. (Note: Those plans were eventually filed in C&R's "Spring Styles" book of experimental naval design and can still been seen here.) (Note: Goodall would eventually become Director of Naval Construction (DNC) for the Royal Navy. Among his other tasks in this post was giving expert testimony and analysis on the loss of the Hood in 1941 (Friedman (1985), p. 163; ADM 116/4351: Report on the Loss of H.M.S. Hood. Retrieved 8 May 2012.) In addition, a senior U.S. constructor who served on Admiral Sims's staff in London, L.C. McBride, became privy to much British experience and was able to share it with C&R. While C&R worked concurrently on the more conventional, more heavily armed and armored South Dakota class, it quickly adopted and incorporated ideas from Hood into the Lexington project which included a reduction of the main armor belt, the change to "sloped armor" and the addition of four above-water torpedo tubes that were added to the four underwater tubes that had been included in the original design. Other changes included a widening of the ship to allow for an adequate torpedo protection system and an increase in vertical belt armor to 7 inches (180 mm). Another improvement in boiler technology reduced the number of boilers to 16 and the number of funnels to just two, but increased the normal displacement of the ship to 43,500 tons, 300 tons more than the South Dakota class and 10,900 tons greater than the previous battleship class, the Colorado class.

Four proposed redesigns were submitted to the General Board on 3 June 1918, along with a letter that requested a formal reconsideration by the Navy that the Lexingtons be armored to protect them only against fire of guns six inches and smaller. The Board, concerned about the delay incorporating any of the redesigns would have on not just the Lexingtons but the 1916 building program in general and the subsequent cost, declined all four designs. The Board also feared that producing heavily armored fast battleships such as Hood would make the U.S. Navy's Standard type battleships obsolete, just as HMS Dreadnought made the Royal Navy's pre-dreadnought battleships obsolescent and negated its advantage in numbers over other navies. This did not stop the U.S. Commander in Chief in European waters, Admiral William S. Sims, to argue for the redesigned vessels by pointing out that Hood had already brought about the very revolution that the Board wished to suppress. (Note: Sims' argument was based in part on erroneous information, as the Admiralty assured him that they planned to complete Hood's three sister-ships when they had actually been cancelled (Friedman (1984), pp. 98–99).) Debate continued while the project remained suspended until May 1919, when the Board decided that the battlecruisers should be built as planned, except for a slightly slower version of Design B from C&R with increased protection for turrets, conning towers, magazines and communications. This amended version, labeled B3, was the final version of the Lexington battlecruiser design.

== Design ==
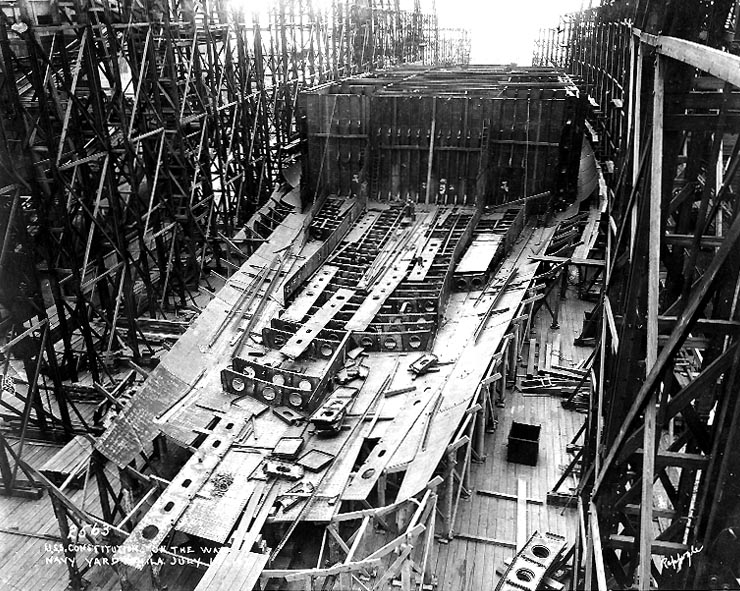
Constitution under construction in Philadelphia in July 1921, seven months before work was suspended pending the outcome of the Washington Naval Conference

=== General characteristics ===
The Lexington-class ships had an overall length of 874 feet (266.4 m), a beam of 105 feet 4 inches (32.1 m), and a draft of 31 feet (9.4 m). They displaced 43,500 long tons (44,200 t) at normal load and 44,638 long tons (45,354 t) at deep load. Because the demand for extreme speed necessitated a long hull with maximum freeboard, the forecastle was extended down 75 percent of the total length of the hull. For this class, Rear Admiral David W. Taylor, who served as Chief Constructor for the Bureau of Construction and Repair, used a relatively new kind of bow called the bulbous bow or Taylor bow. The result of a series of towing tests begun in 1910, this bow reduced water resistance by an average of six percent, supported the forecastle and reduced bending stress on the hull. At speeds of more than 25 knots, test results were highly favorable. A disadvantage was the formation of a heavy layer of water which would creep up along the outer plating of the forecastle at higher speeds. However, this tendency could be reduced to some degree by careful design of the frames. Taylor first introduced this bow, also known as a bulbous forefoot, in his design of USS Delaware, which entered service in 1910.

=== Propulsion ===
Turbo-electric propulsion was selected for the battlecruisers despite the fact it needed more room than geared turbines to allow for better underwater protection that wartime experience showed was essential. First used in the Tennessee-class battleships, it also had several other advantages. The turbines could run at their optimum speed, without regard to propeller speed, which was economical on fuel and the machinery could be easily sub-divided which increased the ships' ability to withstand torpedo hits. The substitution of flexible electric cables for bulky steam-lines meant that the motors could be mounted further to the rear of the ship, which reduced both vibration and weight by shortening the propeller shafts. Also, the ship could go astern at full power simply by reversing the electrical polarity of the motors. Despite these factors and the fact that American companies would have struggled to produce the very large geared steam turbines needed for such big ships, the Curtis Company tried unsuccessfully to convince the Navy to reverse this decision. The Navy countered that doing so would mean a complete rearrangement of machinery spaces and a reduction in underwater protection.

Each propeller was 14 feet 9 inches (4.50 m) in diameter and each of the four propeller shafts was powered by two 22,500-shaft-horsepower (16,800 kW) electric motors acting in tandem. These motors were about five times the size of any earlier electric motor. Four General Electric turbo generators powered each propeller shaft and each was rated at 35,200 kilowatts (47,200 hp), 5000 volts and 4620 amps of direct current (DC). Each of the four AC alternators produced 40,000 KVA. Sixteen water-tube boilers, each in their own individual compartment, provided steam for the generators at a working pressure of 295 psi (2,034 kPa; 21 kgf/cm^{2}) and a temperature of 460 °F (238 °C). The turbo-electric machinery of the Lexington-class ships was designed to produce a total of 180,000 shaft horsepower (130,000 kW) and propel the ships at 33.25 knots (61.58 km/h; 38.26 mph), but each ship reached over 202,000 shp (151,000 kW) and 34.5 knots (63.9 km/h; 39.7 mph) during sea trials in 1928. Six 750-kilowatt (1,010 hp) DC turbo generators were installed in the upper levels of the two main turbine compartments.

The estimated range would have been 10,000 nautical miles (19,000 km; 12,000 mi) at a speed of 10 knots (19 km/h; 12 mph).

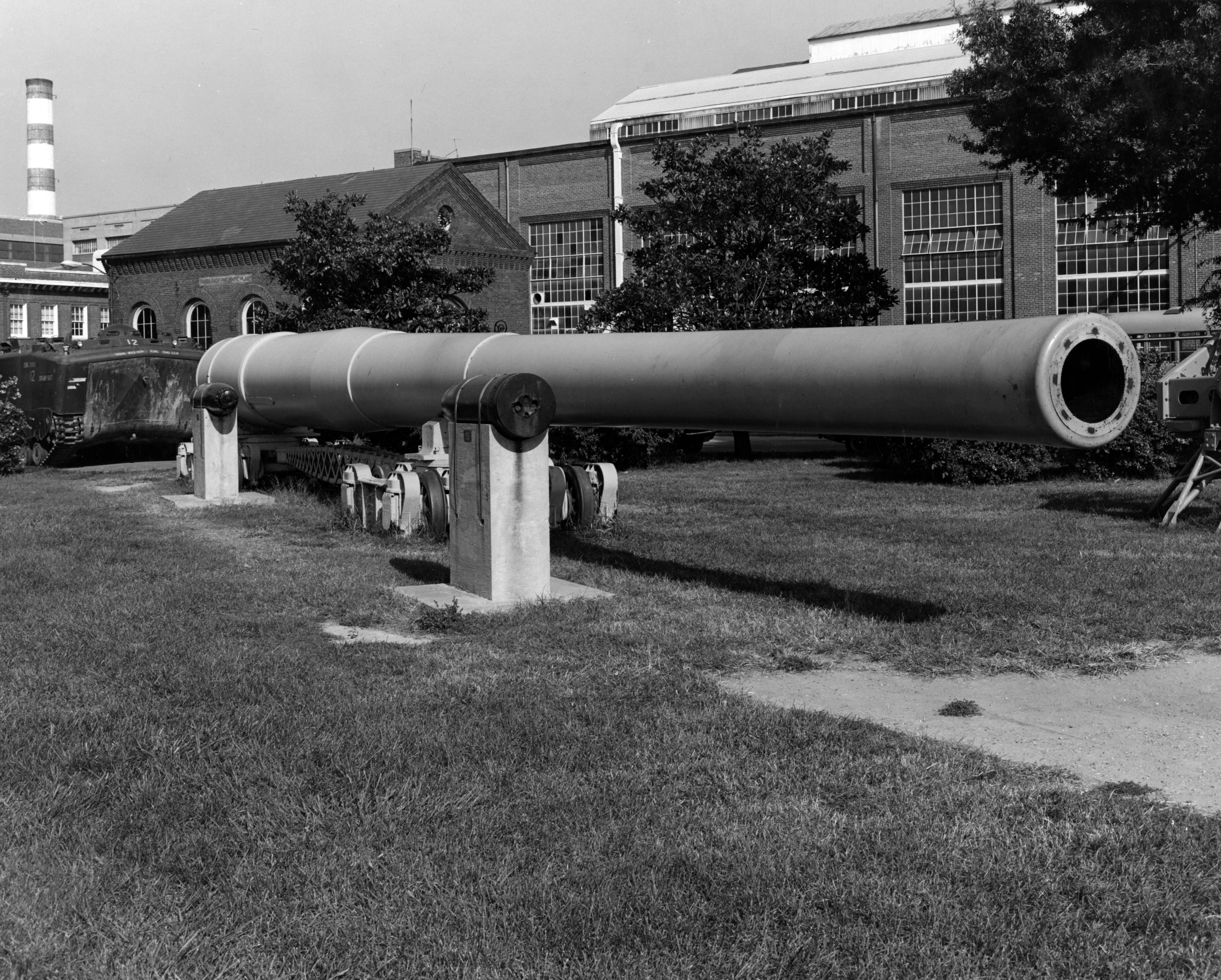
16"/50 Mark 2 gun on display in Washington Navy Yard

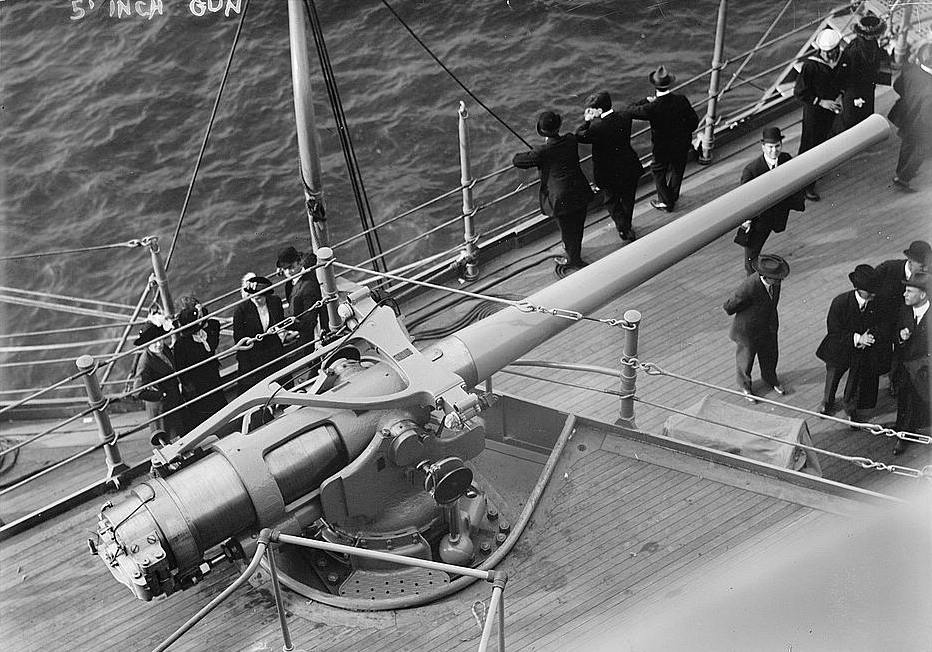
5"/51 cal, possibly on USS Texas

=== Armament ===
==== Main guns ====
The original design of the Lexington class called for ten 14"/50 caliber guns of either the Mark 4, 5, or 6 variety to be mounted in four turrets (two triple superfiring over two double turrets) for the main armament. (Note: Though no source states what Mark was used, the only three versions of the 14" U.S. gun that were 50 caliber were Marks 4, 5 and 6.) (Note: Breyer's sketch shows two twin turrets superfiring over two triple turrets as in the Nevada class (Breyer, p. 236).) Designed in 1916 and put into service by 1918, these guns were installed on the Tennessee- and New Mexico-class battleships. The guns were capable of firing a 1,400 pounds (640 kg) armor-piercing (AP) projectile at a muzzle velocity of 2,800 fps (853 m/s) to a range of 24,000 yards (22 km) at a maximum angle of 15 degrees.

Later designs called for eight 16"/50 caliber Mark 2 gun, also slated to be used on the South Dakota-class battleship of 1920. Like the 14"/50 caliber gun, the 16" gun was designed in 1916. Basically an extended version of the 16"/45 caliber Mark 1 gun used on the Colorado class, it fired the same 2,100-pound (950 kg) shell as the Mark 1 at a muzzle velocity of 2,800 fps (853 mps) and rate of two rounds per minute to a range of 44,500 yards (40,700 m) at an elevation of 45 degrees.

A prototype Mark 2 was tested and proven on 8 April 1918, and the gun was scheduled to go into naval service in 1923. However, with the cancellation of both the Lexington and the South Dakota classes, no guns were installed on any ships even though 71 had been built and 44 were under construction. In 1922–24, twenty of the guns were given to the Army for use as coastal defense guns along with the Army's 16"/50 caliber M1919 guns. Later planning called for the use of these guns in the Iowa-class battleships, but miscommunication between design bureaus led to the 16"/50 caliber Mark 7 gun being used instead. As a result, all but three of the Navy's remaining Mark 2 and 3 guns were sent to the Army to also be used as coastal defense guns.

==== Secondary guns ====
The original design called for eighteen 5"/51 caliber guns. These guns were originally mounted on the Florida- and Wyoming-class battleships, but they found their way into the secondary armament of every U.S. battleship that was built prior to the Washington Naval Treaty. Also, many of the destroyers, submarines, and auxiliaries that were built during this time mounted this gun as their main gun. They fired a 50-pound (23 kg) shell at a muzzle velocity of 3,150 fps (960 mps) and a rate of eight or nine rounds per minute to a range of 18,880 yards (17,260 m) at an elevation of 25 degrees.

The secondary armament was later upped to sixteen 6"/53 caliber guns in Mark 13 casemate mountings during one of the redesigns. Designed in 1920 and in service by 1923, these guns became the main armament on the Omaha-class light cruisers, Narwhal, Nautilus, and Argonaut submarines, and they were intended as secondary armament on the South Dakota-class battleships. They fired a 105-pound (48 kg) shell at a muzzle velocity of 3,000 fps (914 mps) and a rate of six or seven rounds per minute to a range of 25,300 yards (23,100 m) at an elevation of 30 degrees.

==== Anti-aircraft guns ====
Four 3"/23 caliber Mark 11 anti-aircraft guns were planned for the original and first redesigned versions of the Lexingtons. This was increased to eight guns in the final version. These could depress to −10 degrees and elevate to 85 degrees. They fired a 13-pound (5.9 kg) shell at a muzzle velocity of 1,650 fps (503 mps) and rate of between eight and nine rounds per minute to a range of 8,800 yards (8,000 m) and a height of 18,000 feet (5,500 m).

==== Torpedo tubes ====
Eight 21-inch (533 mm) torpedo tubes were to be carried. Four of these would be mounted inside the hull below the waterline, two at either side of the bow; the others would be above the waterline at the stern, two at either side.

=== Armor ===
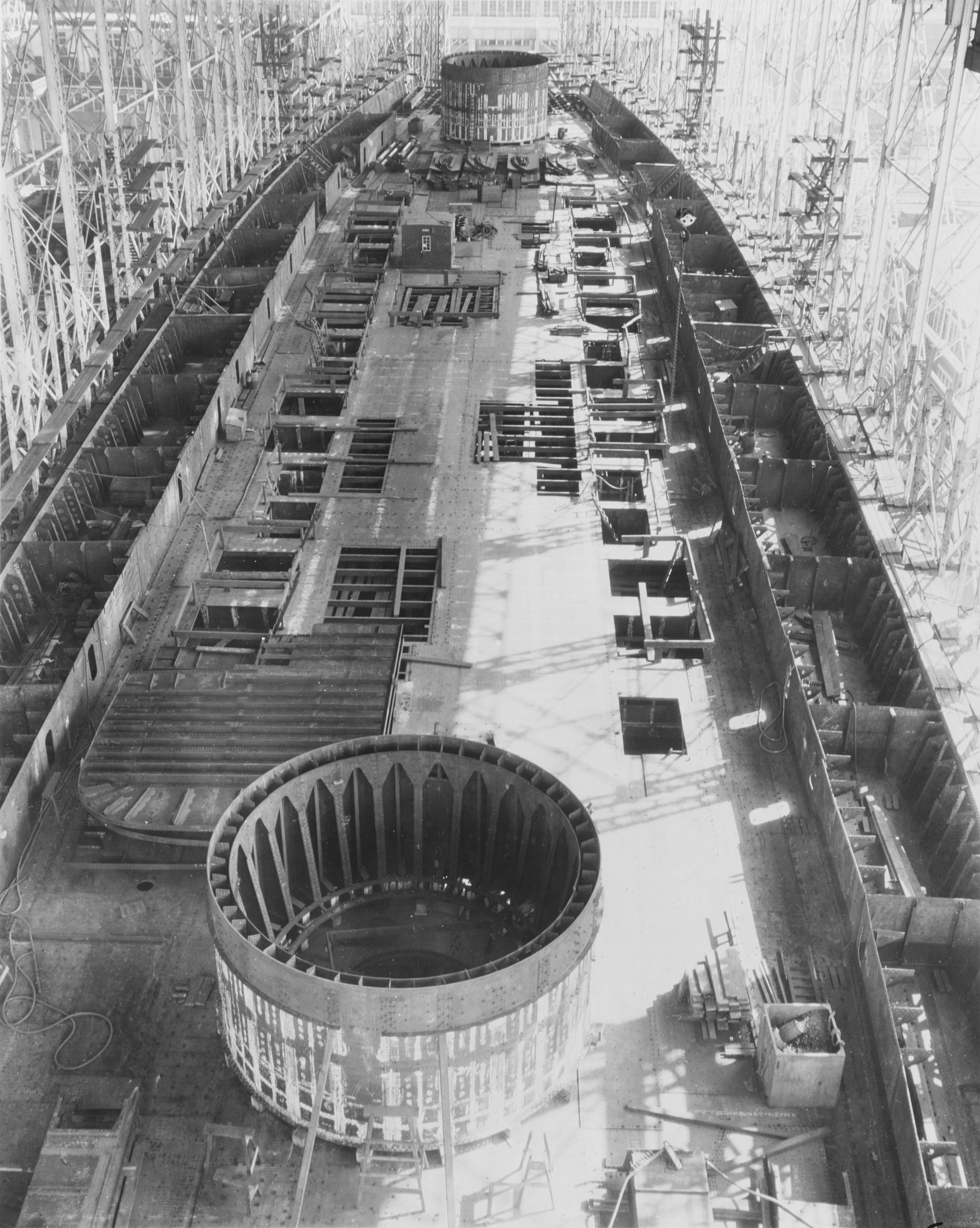
Saratoga on 8 March 1922, after her construction had been suspended. The circular barbettes on blocks on her deck were intended for the battlecruiser's main battery

The waterline belt of the Lexington-class ships tapered 7–5 inches (178–127 mm) in thickness from top to bottom and was angled 11° outwards at the top to increase the armor's relative thickness to horizontal, close-range fire (a concept taken from HMS Hood). The downside to this practice was a reduction of the relative height of the belt, which increased the chance of plunging shellfire going over or under it. The belt covered the middle 530 feet (161.5 m) of the ships. Forward, the belt ended in a bulkhead also tapered from seven to five inches in thickness. Aft, it terminated at a seven-inch bulkhead. This belt had a height of 17 feet (5.2 m). The upper deck was 2.25 inches (57 mm) thick in two layers. The third deck over the ships' machinery and magazine was armored with two layers of Special treatment steel (STS) totaling 2 inches (51 mm) in thickness. The steering gear, however, was protected by two layers of STS that totaled 3 inches (76 mm) on the slope and 4.5 inches (114 mm) on the slope.

The turret faces were 11 inches (279 mm) thick while their sides were 6 inches (152 mm) in thickness, and the roof was five inches thick. The barbettes had a maximum of 9 inches (229 mm) of armor, but were reduced in thickness in stages below decks to a minimum thickness of five inches. The conning tower armor was 12 inches (305 mm) thick, and it had a communications tube with 10 inches (254 mm) sides ran from the conning tower down to the lower conning position on the 1st platform deck. The torpedo defense system of the Lexington-class ships consisted of three to six medium steel protective bulkheads that ranged from .375 to .75 inches (10 to 19 mm) in thickness. The spaces between them could be left empty or used as fuel tanks to absorb the detonation of a torpedo's warhead.

=== Aircraft ===
None of the designs made provision for aircraft. However, the Navy planned to adapt the poop deck of these vessels to accommodate aircraft at a later date.

== Conversion ==
Construction finally began upon the battlecruisers in 1920 and 1921, after a delay of almost five months. However, that July, U.S. Secretary of State Charles Evans Hughes called for a conference in Washington D.C. to be held that November. The stated goal was to curb the rapidly growing and extremely expensive naval construction programs. It was obvious to the General Board that the expensive new battlecruisers, which some thought were already obsolete, would be very attractive targets for cancellation. Accordingly, studies were done exploring the possibilities of converting one or more of the battlecruisers to different uses: one looked at a conversion to an aircraft carrier, while another contemplated a conversion to an Atlantic ocean liner.

Conversion of a Lexington to an aircraft carrier had both positive and negative aspects when compared with a "specifically designed carrier". While the conversion would have better anti-torpedo protection, larger magazines for aircraft bombs than a keel-up carrier and more room for aircraft landings (the after elevator would be 28 feet farther up), it would also be a half-knot slower with less hangar space (about 16 percent less), less emergency fuel and "narrower lines" aft (pilots landing on the converted battlecruiser would not have as wide of a runway to aim for). Comparing costs, a brand-new aircraft carrier would cost $27.1 million, while a conversion of one of the Lexington class, not counting the $6.7 million already sunk into them, would cost $22.4 million. (Note: Both of these figures (the $6.7 and $22.4) are estimates for one of the lesser-advanced ships like Ranger. The former cost would be higher and the second lower for one of the more-advanced ships.)

Any debate over converting them was quelled by the signing of the Washington Naval Treaty. Under the terms of the treaty, any capital ships that were under construction by the five signatories (the United States, Great Britain, France, Italy and Japan) had to be canceled and scrapped. For battlecruisers, this encompassed the United States' Lexington class, Japan's Amagi class, and Great Britain's G3 battlecruisers. However, the treaty did allow the participating nations to take two of the capital ships they had under construction and convert them to aircraft carriers; the U.S. Navy decided to complete the two Lexingtons that were closest to completion, Lexington and Saratoga.

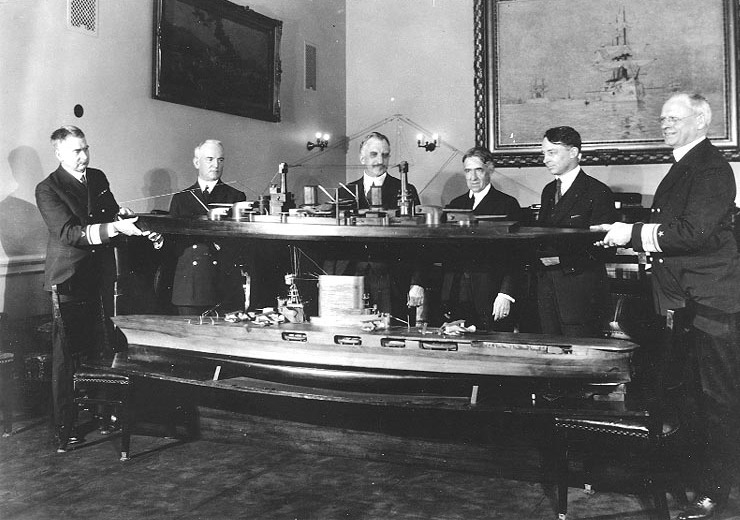
Rear Admiral David W. Taylor (left), Chief of the Bureau of Construction and Repair, and Rear Admiral John K. Robison (right), Chief of the Bureau of Engineering, hold a model of the battlecruiser above a model of the proposed conversion to an aircraft carrier at the Navy Department on 8 March 1922.

The problem was that the tonnage cap for new carrier construction had been set at 27,000 tons, which was too low for any practical conversion of the battlecruisers. An exception, spearheaded by Assistant Secretary of the Navy Theodore Roosevelt Jr., was added to the treaty. This gave the five nations the option to convert no more than two capital ships that were under construction to 33,000 ton aircraft carriers. But even that increase of 6,000 tons (from 27,000 to 33,000) was almost not enough for a conversion—it took creative interpreting of a clause in the treaty to allow for the conversion without removing half of the power plant, which the General Board did not want to do. The clause (Chapter II, Part III, Section I, (d)):

No retained capital ships or aircraft carriers shall be reconstructed except for the purpose of providing means of defense against air and submarine attack, and subject to the following rules: The Contracting Powers may, for that purpose, equip existing tonnage with bulge or blister or anti-air attack deck protection, providing the increase of displacement thus effected does not exceed 3,000 tons (3,048 metric tons) displacement for each ship.

Without this clause, the two carriers would have likely been in serious trouble—1928 estimates for the two ships put Lexington at an actual tonnage of 35,689 tons and Saratoga at 35,544, though on official lists the number given was 33,000 tons with a footnote that stated "[this number] does not include weight allowance under Ch. 11, pt. 3, Sec. 1, art. (d) of Washington Treaty for providing means against air and submarine attack". This tonnage was used by these ships for their entire careers.

== Ships in class ==
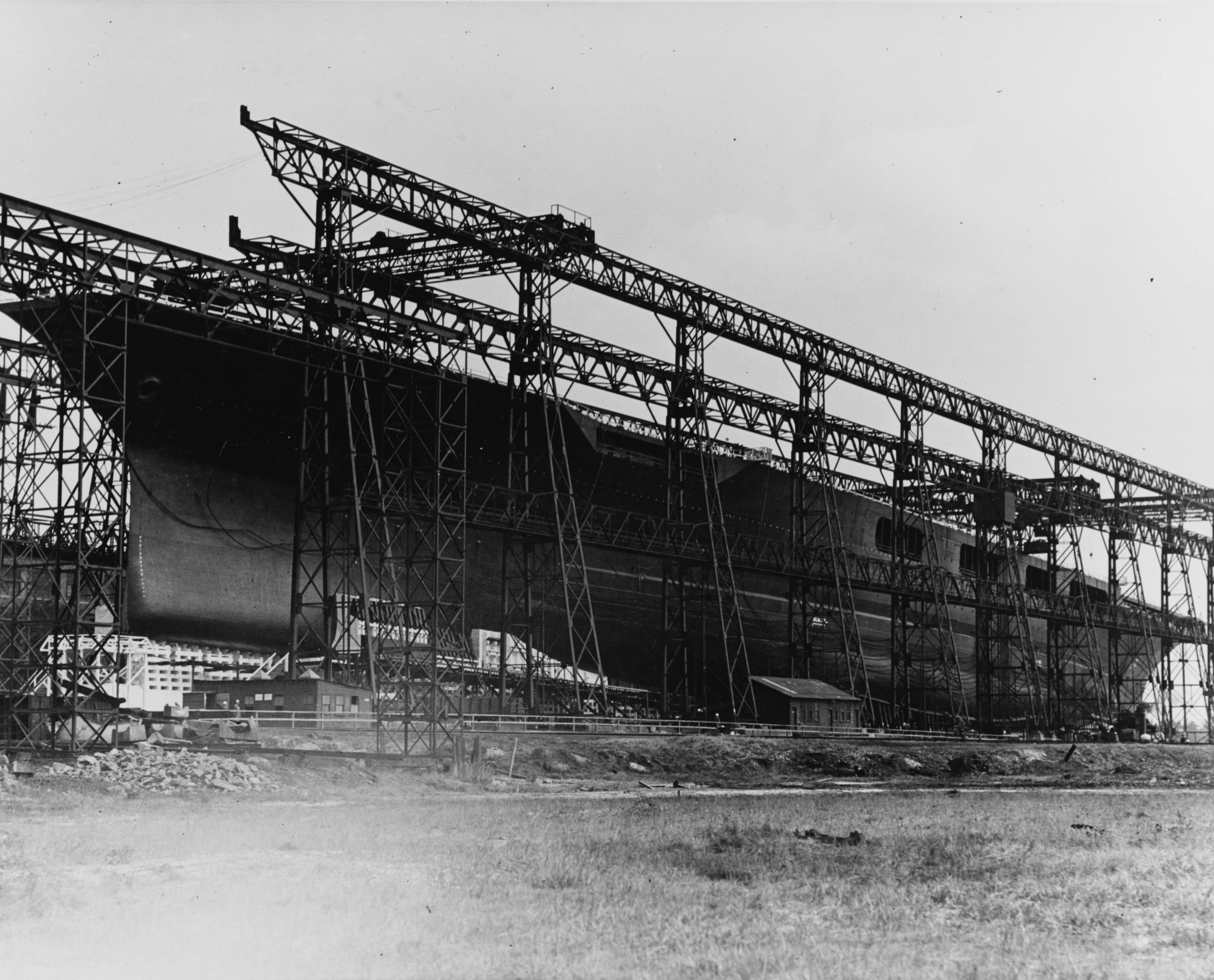
Lexington shortly before her launch, circa 1925

Following adoption of the Washington Naval Treaty, construction on all the ships was stopped in February 1922. Two of the battlecruiser hulls were reordered as the Lexington-class aircraft carriers Lexington (CV-2) and Saratoga (CV-3) under the terms of the Treaty, while the other four ships were formally cancelled and scrapped in place. Due to the planned re-use of the name, USS Constitution was renamed Old Constitution from 1 December 1917 until the name was returned on 24 July 1925.

Ship	Hull number	Builder	Laid down	Launched	Commissioned	Fate
Lexington (ex-Constitution)	CC-1	Fore River Shipyard, Quincy, Massachusetts	8 January 1921	3 October 1925	14 December 1927	Converted to aircraft carrier 1922–1927; Sunk in air attack, 8 May 1942
Constellation	CC-2	Newport News Shipbuilding, Newport News, Virginia	18 August 1920	—N/a		Cancelled, August 1923; Sold, 8 November 1923 for $45,666.66 and broken up in place
Saratoga (Note: Because more progress had been made on the construction of Saratoga (35.4% versus 22.7%), she was converted instead of Constellation.)	CC-3	New York Shipbuilding, Camden, New Jersey	25 September 1920	7 April 1925	16 November 1927	Converted to aircraft carrier 1922–1927; Sunk as a target ship during Operation Crossroads, 25 July 1946
Ranger (ex-Lexington) (Note: Ranger was originally named Lexington, but was renamed on 10 December 1917.)	CC-4	Newport News Shipbuilding, Newport News, Virginia	23 June 1921	—N/a		Cancelled, August 1923; Sold, 8 November 1923 for $10,666.66 and broken up in place
Constitution (ex-Ranger)	CC-5	Philadelphia Naval Shipyard, Philadelphia, Pennsylvania	25 September 1920	—N/a		Cancelled, August 1923; Sold, 25 October 1923 for $92,024.40 and broken up in place
United States	CC-6	Philadelphia Naval Shipyard, Philadelphia, Pennsylvania	25 September 1920	—N/a		Cancelled 17 August 1923; Sold, 25 October 1923 for $84,996.60 and broken up in place

== See also ==
- List of cruisers of the United States Navy
