= Fort Funston =

Former harbor defense installation in San Francisco

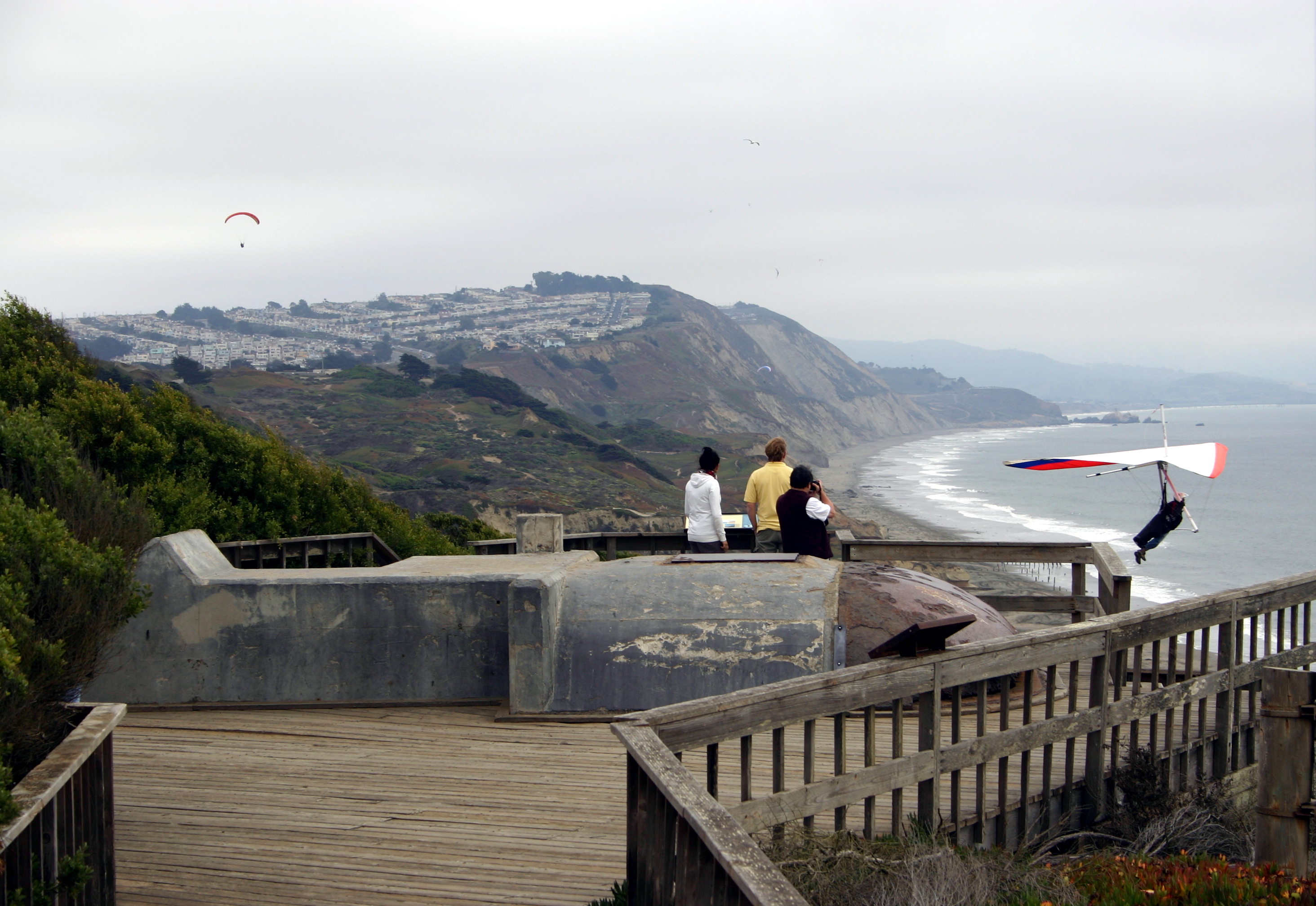
- A hang glider launches from Fort Funston

- Location within San Francisco County Location within California Location within the United States
- Location: San Francisco, California, United States
- Coordinates: 37°42′54″N 122°30′07″W
- Operator: Golden Gate National Parks Conservancy
- Website: Official website
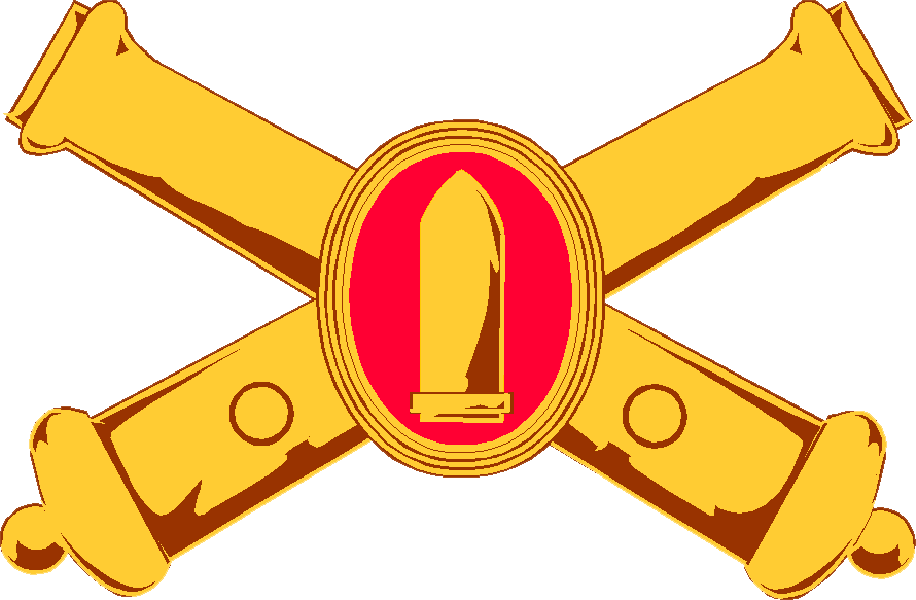
- Fort Funston
- Lake Merced Military Reservation
- Near San Francisco, California in United States

Site information
- Type: Harbor defense installation
- Owner: United States Army
- Controlled by: United States Army Coast Artillery Corps

Site history
- Built: 1900
- Fate: Decommission 1963

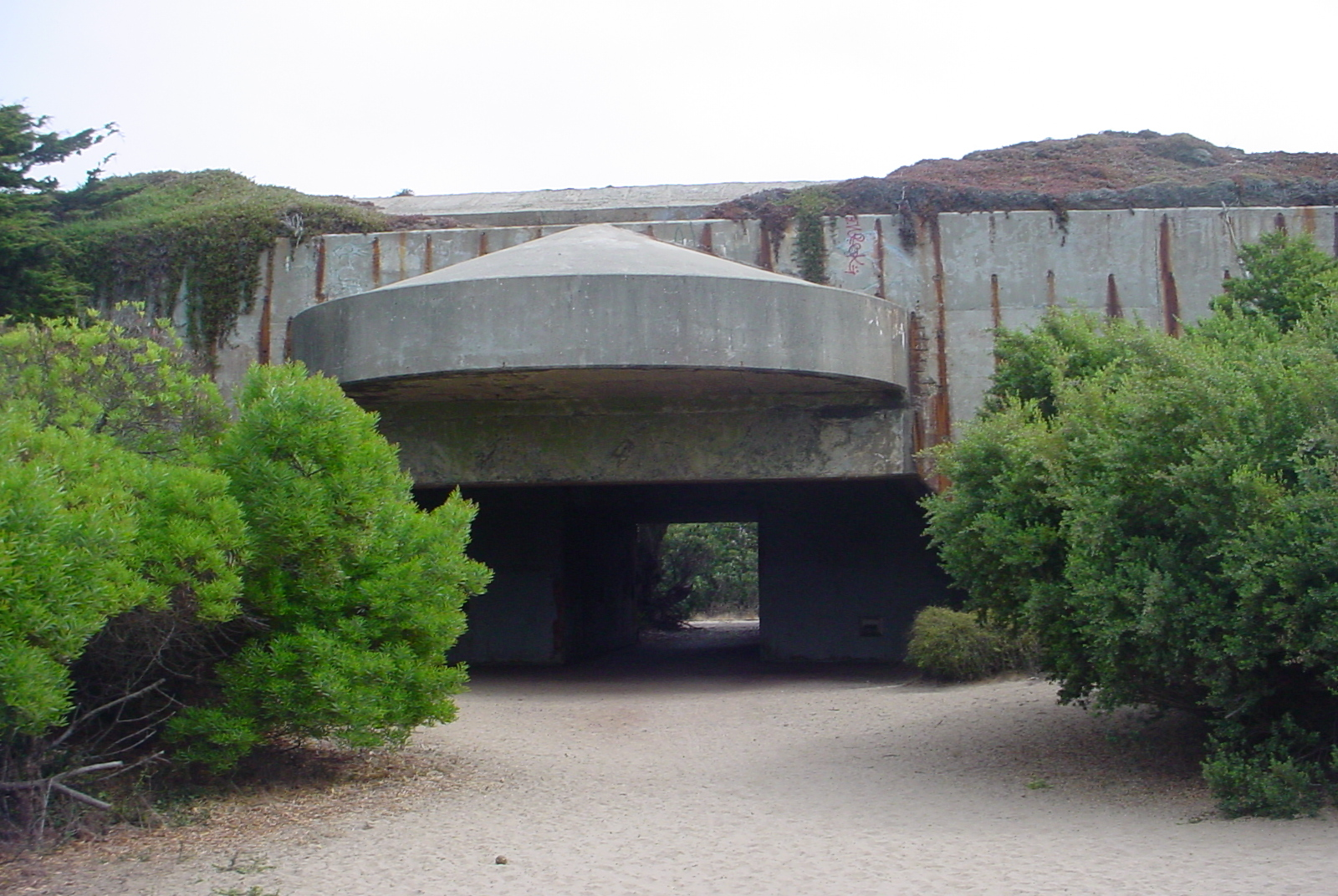
Battery Davis. Some of the earth covering the fort has eroded.

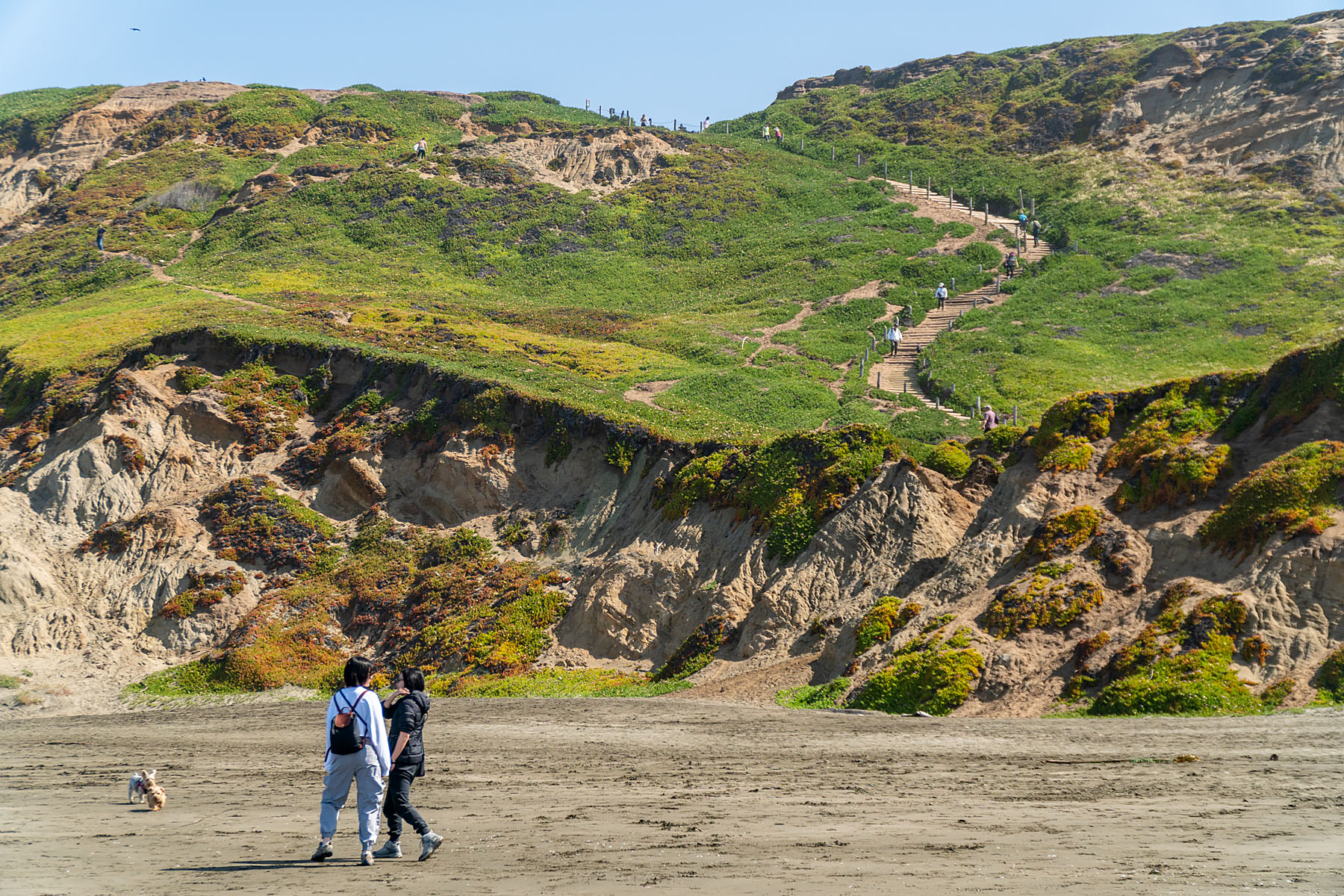
Steps from the southwest corner of the parking area to the beach.

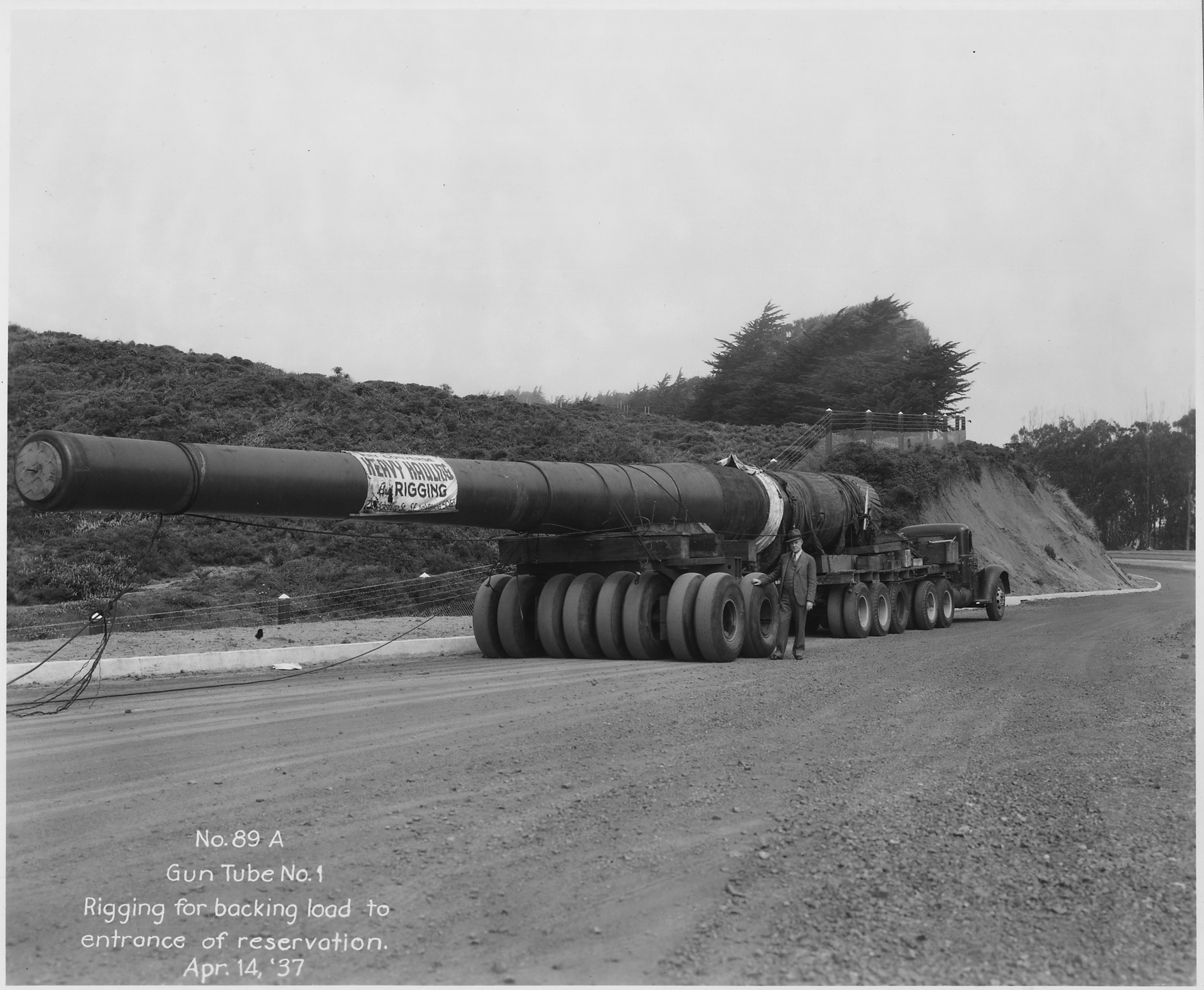
A 16-inch gun on the road to the fort

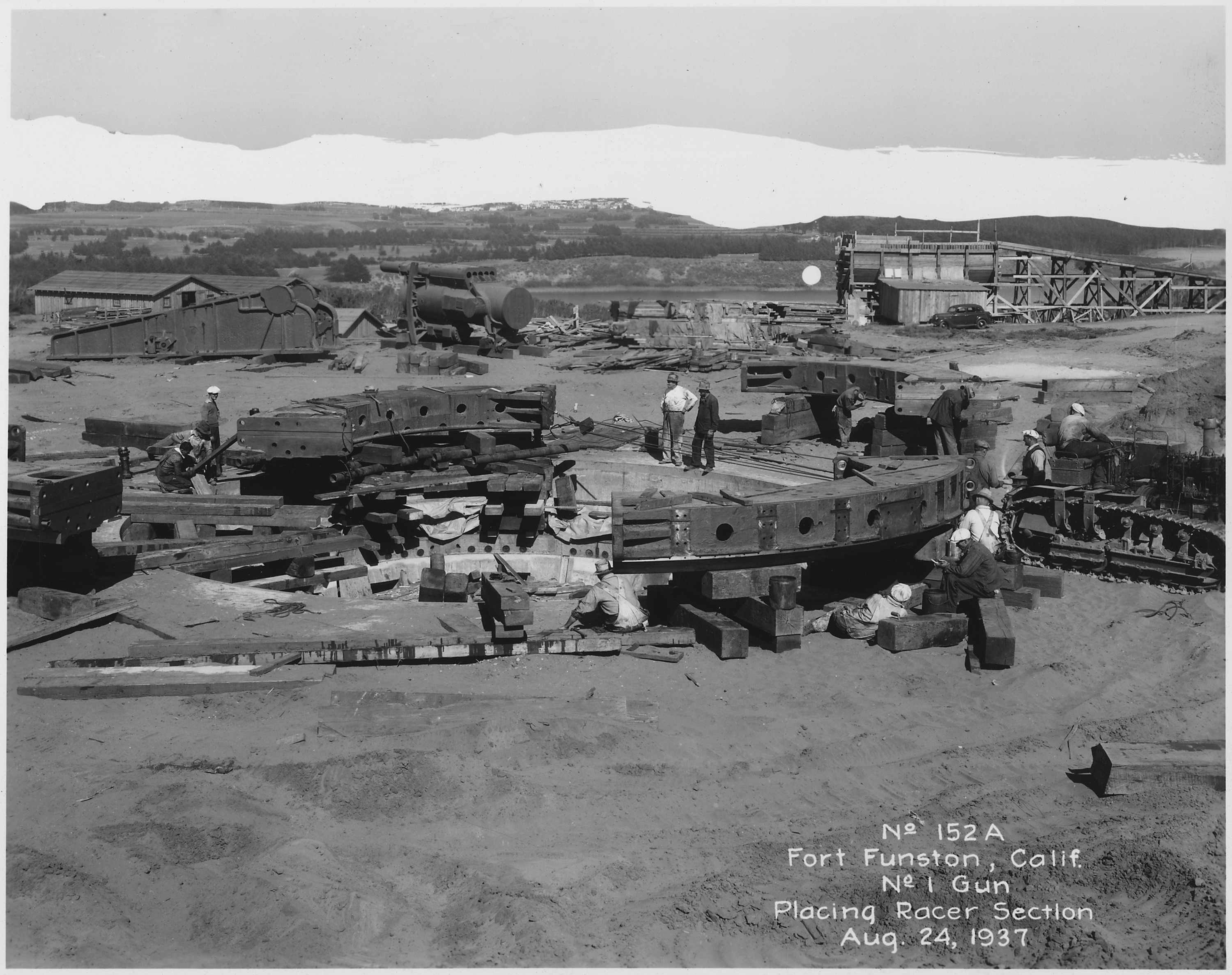
Assembling a 16-inch gun carriage at the fort

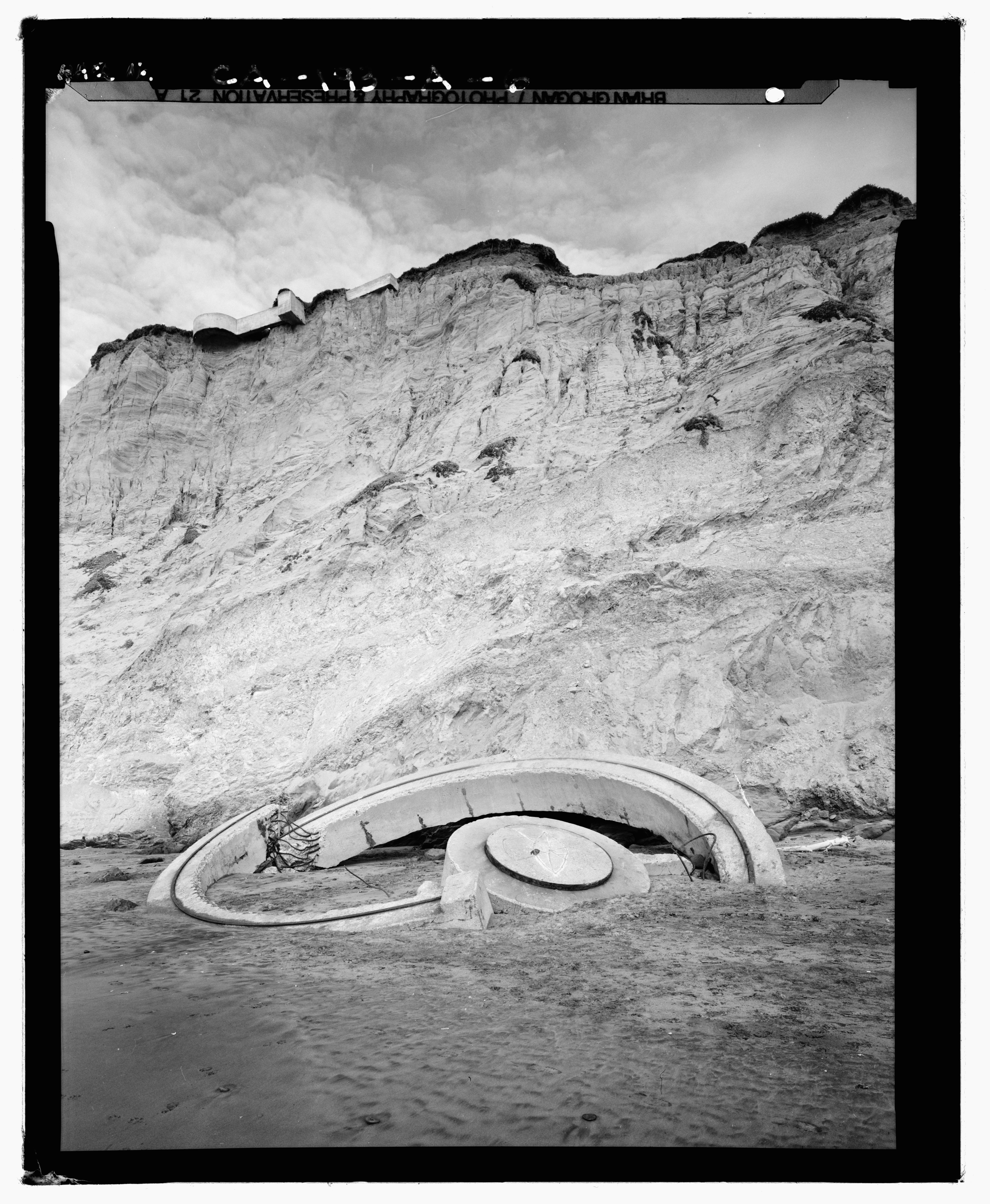
Panama mount fallen from cliff due to erosion. Another mount can be seen at the top of the cliff.

Fort Funston is a former harbor defense installation located on the West Side of San Francisco in the southwestern part of the city. Formerly known as the Lake Merced Military Reservation, the fort is now a protected area within the Golden Gate National Recreation Area (GGNRA) and is used widely as an off-leash dog park. It was named in honor of Frederick N. Funston (1865–1917), a Major General in the United States Army with strong connections to San Francisco, and included several artillery batteries. The fort is located on Skyline Boulevard at John Muir Drive, west of Lake Merced.

The fort was constructed upon windswept headlands along the Pacific coast and Ocean Beach below, above steep sandstone cliffs that provide a nesting habitat for a colony of bank swallows (Riparia riparia). The last remnants of a sand dune ecosystem that once covered the western half of San Francisco grow along the top of the headlands, with trailheads forming part of the California Coastal Trail that runs through San Francisco County.

== History ==
The land was acquired by the federal government in 1900 as the Lake Merced Military Reservation, originally intended to accommodate two 12-inch coast defense mortar batteries in the Coast Defenses of San Francisco (later Harbor Defenses). However, nothing significant was built there until after the American entry into World War I in early 1917. The fort, renamed for Major General Frederick Funston shortly after his death in 1917, began to take shape during World War I, with the construction of a parade ground, barracks and a series of coastal batteries. These were Battery Howe with four 12-inch mortars and Battery Bruff with two 5-inch M1900 guns on pedestal mounts. These weapons were relocated from Batteries McKinnon and Sherwood at Fort Winfield Scott, adjacent to the Presidio. Battery Howe was named for Walter Howe, a general and veteran of the Indian war who died in 1915. Battery Bruff was named after Lawrence Bruff, an Ordnance Corps colonel and instructor at West Point who died in 1911. In 1920 Battery Bruff was disarmed due to a withdrawal from Army service of the 5-inch gun. In the early 1920s, Anti-aircraft Battery No. 5 of three 3-inch guns was built at the fort.

Following World War I, the Washington Naval Treaty of 1923 caused the cancellation of numerous battleships and battlecruisers building and planned for the US Navy. Some of the guns intended for these ships were made available to the United States Army Coast Artillery Corps to defend key ports against a potential naval attack. However, only a few of these weapons were emplaced prior to the outbreak of World War II in September 1939. In 1936–1939 Battery Davis was built at Fort Funston, housing two 16-inch Mark 2 Navy guns. These 143-ton guns were moved on railroad cars in 1937 from Mare Island Naval Shipyard to Southern Pacific's Ocean View Station. This was the prototype US 16-inch battery for casemating against air attack, which was adopted for almost all US 16-inch batteries built during the war and retrofitted to most pre-war batteries of this type. It was also the prototype for the Army's M2 carriage; previous ex-Navy 16-inch guns had used a modified M1919 carriage designed for the 16-inch gun M1919. Battery Davis was named for Major General Richmond P. Davis, a Coast Artillery officer who served in France in World War I, retired in 1929 and died in 1937. Also, an unnamed battery of four 155 mm guns on concrete "Panama mounts" was built at the fort circa 1938.

In 1940 Battery Davis was joined by Battery Townsley at Fort Cronkhite. A third 16-inch battery, Battery 129 (also called "Construction 129") at Fort Barry, was built for the San Francisco area during World War II but not completed or armed. Four additional 155 mm guns on Panama mounts were emplaced as Battery Bluff. Also, four 40 mm Bofors gun batteries were placed around the fort.

From December 1941 through April 1944 Fort Funston's garrison included elements of the 18th Coast Artillery Regiment.

The gun batteries were declared obsolete shortly after World War II, but a 90 mm anti-aircraft gun battery was on the site 1953-57 during the Cold War. Fort Funston later became a Nike missile launch site, hosting sites SF-59L (now the parking lot) and SF-61 from 1956 to 1963. The fort was inactivated in 1963 and eventually transferred to the National Park Service to be administered as part of the Golden Gate National Recreation Area. At some point Batteries Howe and Bruff were demolished, while the Panama mounts have either been destroyed by erosion or buried.

== Features ==
The area is covered with a network of trails suitable for hiking or horseback riding. There are two Dutch sand ladders that extend down the dunes to the beach. The beach is known for its magnetic sand and strong currents, discouraging swimming. Fort Funston is a popular dog park and the only park in the GGNRA that allows off-leash dogs.

The strong, steady winds make the cliffs overlooking the beach a popular site for hang gliding. The gliding is rated intermediate difficulty (Level III). When the NPS first took over administration of the area in the early 1970s, rangers asked hang gliders what they needed. A few months later NPS opened up a gate so fliers could drive up to the old Nike site to park rather than hike in from the road, and they provided a port-a-potty.

Additionally, the world record for the farthest thrown object was set here in 2003 by Erin Hemmings, who threw an Aerobie flying ring 1,333 feet.

== Wildlife ==
- Bank swallow (Riparia riparia)

== See also ==
- Seacoast defense in the United States
- List of beaches in California
- List of California state parks
