= Fort Amador =

Historic United States Army bases

Coordinates: 8°56′17″N 79°32′52″W

Fort Amador (Spanish: Fuerte Amador) and Fort Grant were former United States Army bases built to protect the Pacific (southern) end of the Panama Canal at Panama Bay. Amador was the primary on-land site, lying below the Bridge of the Americas. Grant consisted of a series of islands lying just offshore, some connected to Amador via a causeway. Fort Sherman was the corresponding base on the Atlantic (northern) side. All of the forts were turned over to the Republic of Panama in 1999, and the area is now a major tourist attraction.

== History ==
The offshore islands had always been considered excellent defensive grounds and were long visited by English pirates. Sir Francis Drake, Captain Cook, and Henry Morgan all used Taboga and Perico as refuges, after raiding Spanish galleons. It was here that then-Captain Ulysses S. Grant ended his cross-Panama march in 1852.

During the construction of the Panama Canal, notably the Culebra Cut, waste material was dumped in a mangrove bush then known as the "Balboa dump". As the work progressed, the dump was backfilled to create a large breakwater, which was later extended to the nearest of the offshore islands, Naos. This work was completed in 1912, and the military reservations were given their official names that year. Fort Amador is named for Manuel Amador Guerrero, the first president of Panama, while Fort Grant was named to commemorate Grant's earlier crossing to that point.

The two forts initially claimed only about 70 acres (28 ha) of land, but this expanded over the years to over 70 acres (28 ha). Amador was the primary infantry and support area, and grew to include a rather prominent "tank farm" for fuel storage. Grant was used primarily for naval defence, and included a number of large batteries on the various islands. To supply them, the causeway was extended to connect from Naos to the other nearby islands, Culebra, Perico, and Flamenco, all of which had batteries of various sizes. Grant also included the nearby unconnected islands of San Jose, Panamarca, Changarmi, Tortolita, Torola, Taboga, Cocovieceta, Cocovi, and Venado.

== Armament ==
Fort Amador was initially armed with two batteries, each of two six inch disappearing guns. Batteries Birnie and Snith, begun in 1913, were completed in 1917. They remained in service until 1943, when the guns were removed, and the structures buried. The area was then used for housing. A 90mm Anti-Motor Torpedo Boat (AMTB) Battery replaced them in 1942; it, too, was disarmed and buried in 1948.

== See also ==
- 14-inch M1920 railway gun
- 16-inch gun M1895 at Fort Grant
- Panama Canal Zone
- List of former United States military installations in Panama
