= 16-inch gun M1895 =

16-inch coastal defense gun M1895
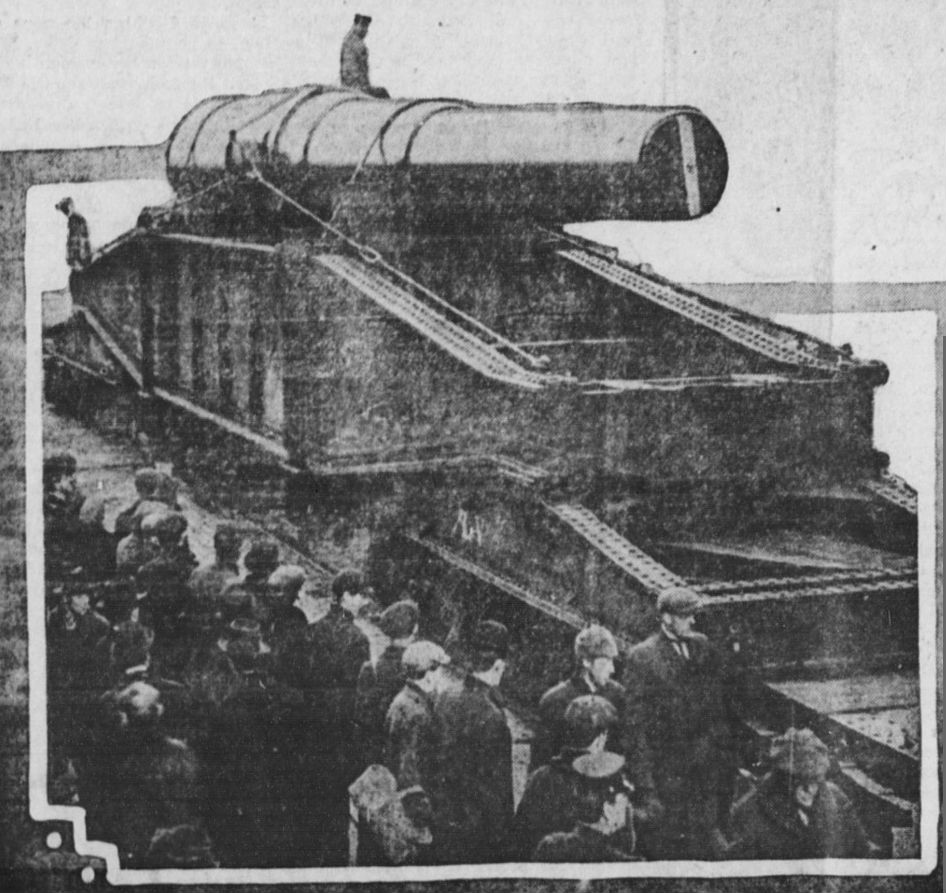
- Crowds in New York watch the shipment of the 16-inch coastal defense gun M1895, January 1915
- Type: Coastal artillery
- Place of origin: United States

Service history
- In service: 1915–1943
- Used by: United States Army
- Wars: World War I

Production history
- Designer: Watervliet Arsenal
- Designed: 1895
- Manufacturer: Watervliet Arsenal
- No. built: 1

Specifications
- Mass: 284,000 pounds (129,000 kg)
- Length: 35 calibers (56 feet (17 m))
- Shell: 2,400 pounds (1,100 kg) shell, 650 pounds (290 kg) nitrocellulose powder
- Caliber: 16 in (406 mm)
- Carriage: M1912 disappearing
- Elevation: -5° to +20°
- Traverse: circa 160°
- Muzzle velocity: 2,250 feet per second (690 m/s)
- Maximum firing range: 19,300 yards (17,600 m)
- Feed system: hand

The 16-inch coastal defense gun M1895 was a large artillery piece installed to defend major American seaports. Only one was built and it was installed in Fort Grant on the Pacific side of the Panama Canal Zone. It was operated by the United States Army Coast Artillery Corps.

== History ==
Under President Grover Cleveland's administration in 1885, the Board of Fortifications under William C. Endicott was ordered to investigate the value and state of the United States' coastal defenses. Endicott found that America had fallen behind and that new naval technology made many forts and coastal defense weaponry obsolete. The 1886 report recommended a $127-million ($4,551,000,000 in 2025) construction program of breech-loading cannons, mortars, floating batteries, and submarine mines for some 29 locations on the US coastline. New fortifications built in the following decades as a result of this report were called "Endicott Period" fortifications.

Finding a need for long range weaponry, the United States Army Coast Artillery Corps ordered a 16-inch (406 mm) gun, the construction of which began in 1895 at the Watervliet Arsenal in Watervliet, New York. The massive artillery piece was designated the M1895 and was completed in 1902; only one was built. At 284,000 pounds (129,000 kg) it weighed more than any gun that had ever been created up to that point. The 32-wheel train car alone weighed 192,420 pounds (87,280 kg). The 56-foot (17 m) long gun could launch a 2,400-pound (1,100 kg) shell 21 miles (34 km).

The weapon was shipped from the Watervliet Arsenal to Watertown Arsenal in Watertown, Massachusetts to be packed for shipment to the Panama Canal Zone. It was installed on an M1912 disappearing carriage in Fort Grant on the Pacific side of the canal in 1915, where it protected the fort until it was scrapped in 1943. The muzzle section was later preserved and displayed at the Watervliet Arsenal museum, which closed in 2013.

== Gallery ==
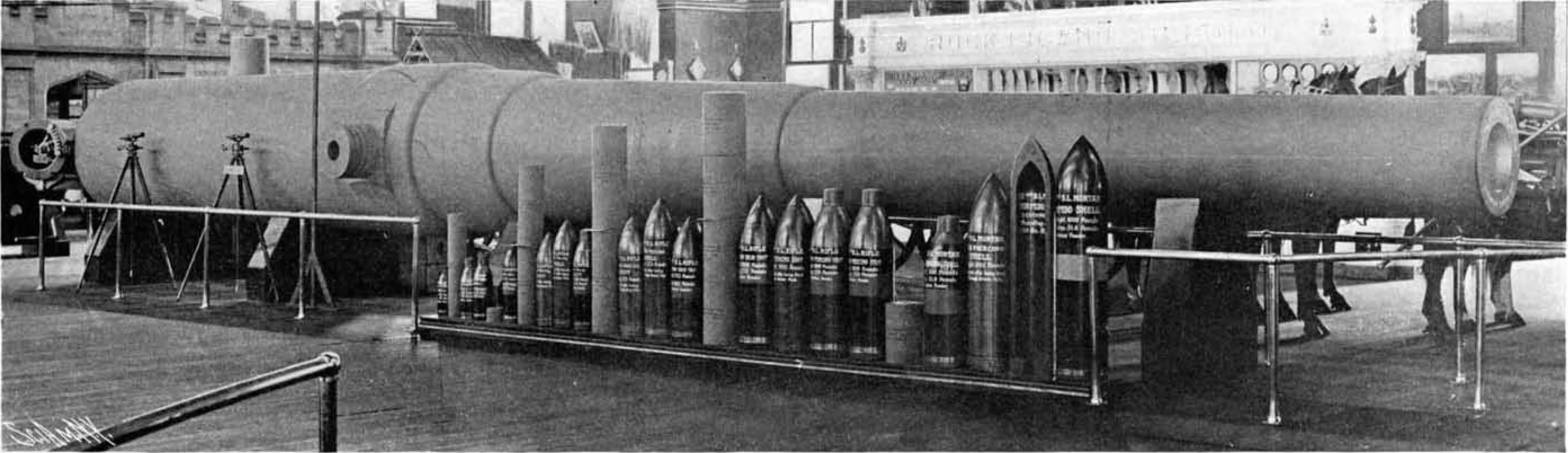
Full-scale model of 16-inch gun M1895 with various ammunition alongside, St. Louis World's Fair, 1904

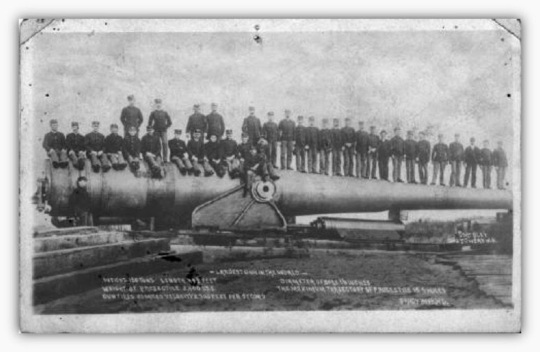
Soldiers standing on the 16-inch gun M1895 at Sandy Hook Proving Ground, New Jersey

== See also ==
- List of U.S. Army weapons by supply catalog designation
- List of the largest cannon by caliber
- Seacoast defense in the United States
- 12-inch Gun M1895
- 16"/50 caliber M1919 gun
- Coast Artillery fire control system
