= Johnny Manziel =

American football player (born 1992)

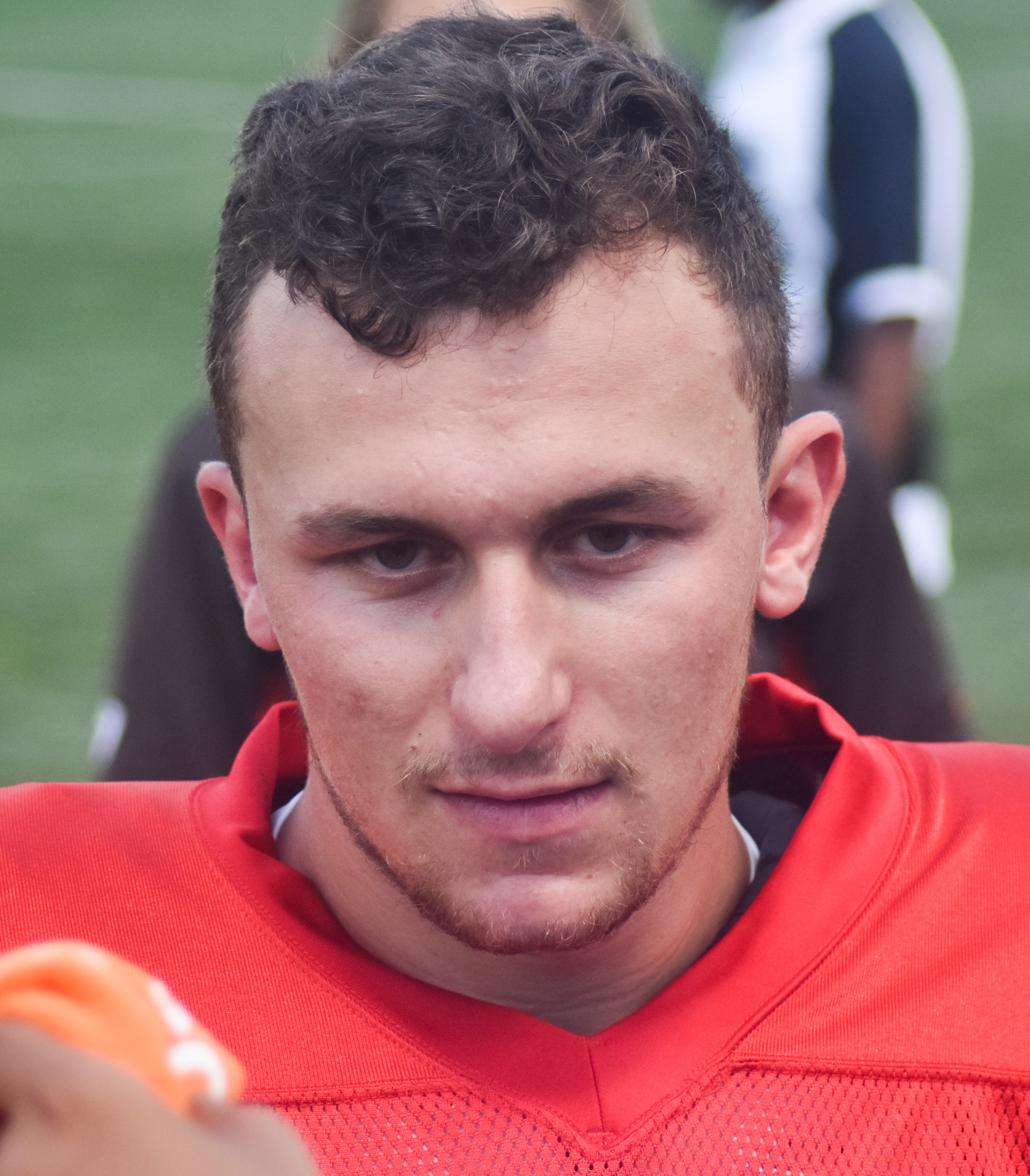
- Manziel with the Cleveland Browns in 2015

No. 2
- Position: Quarterback

Personal information
- Born: December 6, 1992 (age 33); Tyler, Texas, U.S.
- Listed height: 6 ft 0 in (1.83 m)
- Listed weight: 210 lb (95 kg)

Career information
- High school: Tivy (Kerrville, Texas)
- College: Texas A&M (2011–2013)
- NFL draft: 2014: 1st round, 22nd overall pick

Career history
- Cleveland Browns (2014–2015); Hamilton Tiger-Cats (2018); Montreal Alouettes (2018); Memphis Express (2019); FCF Zappers (2021–2022)

Awards and highlights
- Heisman Trophy (2012)

Career NFL statistics
- Passing attempts: 248
- Passing completions: 147
- Completion percentage: 57.0%
- TD–INT: 7–7
- Passing yards: 1,675
- Passer rating: 74.4
- Rushing yards: 259
- Rushing touchdowns: 1
- Stats at Pro Football Reference

Career CFL statistics
- Passing attempts: 165
- Passing completions: 106
- Completion percentage: 64.2%
- TD–INT: 5–7
- Passing yards: 1,290
- Stats at CFL.ca

Johnathan Paul Manziel (/mænˈzɛl/ man-ZEL; born December 6, 1992) is an American former professional football quarterback who played in the National Football League (NFL) for two seasons with the Cleveland Browns. Nicknamed "Johnny Football", he was the first freshman to win the Heisman Trophy, receiving the award with the Texas A&M Aggies in 2012. Manziel also played professionally in the Canadian Football League (CFL), the Alliance of American Football (AAF), and Fan Controlled Football (FCF).

After being redshirted in 2011, Manziel became the Aggies' starter during his freshman season and set several FBS and SEC records en route to a victory in the 2013 Cotton Bowl Classic. In addition to winning the Heisman, he was the first freshman to receive the Manning and Davey O'Brien awards. He was also named SEC Male Athlete of the Year in 2013. Following his sophomore year, Manziel declared for the NFL.

Manziel was selected by the Browns in the first round of the 2014 NFL draft, but his tenure was marked by inconsistent play and off-field controversies, leading to his release ahead of the 2016 season. He pursued a comeback in 2018 with the Hamilton Tiger-Cats and Montreal Alouettes of the CFL before being banned from the league the following year for violating his contract. Shortly after his CFL release, Manziel joined the Memphis Express of the AAF, appearing in two games until the AAF suspended operations. Manziel last played professionally in FCF for the Zappers from 2021 to 2022.

== Early life ==
Manziel was born in Tyler, Texas, on December 6, 1992, to Michelle (née Liberato) and John Paul Manziel. He has a younger sister named Meri.

Manziel's paternal great-great-grandfather Joseph immigrated to the United States, in 1907, from Lebanon and settled in Louisiana. He is of Italian descent on his maternal side.

Manziel grew up playing a variety of sports, including football, basketball, baseball, and golf. At Tivy High School in Kerrville, Texas, he focused on baseball and football. However, in football, sportswriters, coaches, and parents said he "achieved folk hero status" and was compared to quarterbacks like Brett Favre, Michael Vick, and Drew Brees.

=== High school ===
At Tivy High School, Manziel played high school football for four years, beginning with the freshman team in his first year. By the end of his first season, he played with the varsity team as a receiver. He began his sophomore year primarily as a receiver, but started the fourth game at quarterback. He shared that position for the remainder of the season, finishing with 1,164 yards passing, 806 rushing and 408 receiving for a combined 28 touchdowns. His junior year was his first as starting quarterback, and he completed that season with 2,903 passing yards, 1,544 rushing yards, 152 receiving yards and 55 touchdowns. That year, he was voted All-San Antonio Area Offensive Player of the Year as well as District 27-4A MVP.

During Manziel's senior season, he compiled 228-of-347 (65.7%) passing for 3,609 yards with 45 touchdowns and five interceptions. He also had 170 carries for 1,674 yards and 30 touchdowns. He had one touchdown reception and returned a kickoff for a touchdown for a combined 77 touchdowns. That year, he was honored as District 28-4A MVP (unanimous selection), Class 4A First-team All-State (AP), San Antonio Express-News Offensive Player of the Year (second year in a row), the Associated Press (AP) Sports Editors Texas Player of the Year, Sub-5A First-team All-Area (SA Express-News), No. 1 QB in Texas by Dave Campbell's Texas Football, DCTF Top 300, PrepStar All-Region and Super Prep All-Region.

For Manziel's three years as a starter, he completed 520-of-819 passes (63.5%) for 7,626 yards and 76 touchdowns, rushed 531 times for 4,045 yards and 77 touchdowns and caught 30 passes for 582 yards and another five touchdowns. He was the only quarterback in America named as a Parade All-American his senior year, and he was also named The National High School Coaches Association (NHSCA) Senior Athlete of the Year in football. He won the Mr. Texas Football award in 2010.

Manziel was highly recruited out of high school; in addition to Texas A&M, he received offers from Baylor, Colorado State, Iowa State, Louisiana Tech, Oregon, Rice, Stanford, Tulsa, and Wyoming. Although he grew up a Texas Longhorns fan, the University of Texas did not recruit him. Although it was rumored that Texas wanted Manziel at defensive back, Texas coach Mack Brown said the rumor was not true. Though Manziel originally committed to play for Oregon, he later changed his commitment to the Aggies, thanks to the influence of then-quarterbacks coach Tom Rossley.

High school statistics

Year	Team	Comp	Att	Pct	Yds	TD	INT	Rush att	Yds	Avg	TD
2008	Tivy	74	120	61.7%	1,109	11	5	123	835	6.8	15
2009	Tivy	211	349	60.5%	2,782	19	5	232	1,529	6.6	33
2010	Tivy	228	347	65.7%	3,609	45	5	170	1,674	9.8	30
Total		513	816	62.9%	7,500	75	15	525	4,038	7.3	78

Manziel was named to the NUC All World Game (started by David Schuman and National Underclassmen Combine) in 2010 where he rushed for over 100 yards and threw for over 200. It was the first time Manziel dominated on a national stage. He played in the game as a teammate with Oregon quarterback Marcus Mariota.

College recruiting
Name	Hometown	School	Height	Weight	40^{‡}	Commit date
Johnny Manziel; QB	Kerrville, Texas	Tivy HS	6 ft 1 in (1.85 m)	190 lb (86 kg)	4.7	Feb 2, 2011
Johnny Manziel; QB	Recruit ratings: Scout: Rivals: 247Sports: (78)					
Overall recruit ranking: Scout: 45 (QB); 31 (school) Rivals: 97 (QB); 27 (school) 247Sports: 9 (QB) ESPN: 78 (QB)
Note: In many cases, Scout, Rivals, 247Sports, On3, and ESPN may conflict in their listings of height and weight.; In these cases, the average was taken. ESPN grades are on a 100-point scale.; Sources: "Texas A&M Football Commitments". Rivals.; "2011 Texas A & M College Football Recruiting Commits". Scout.; "ESPN". ESPN.; "Scout.com Team Recruiting Rankings". Scout.; "2011 Team Ranking". Rivals.com.

== College career ==
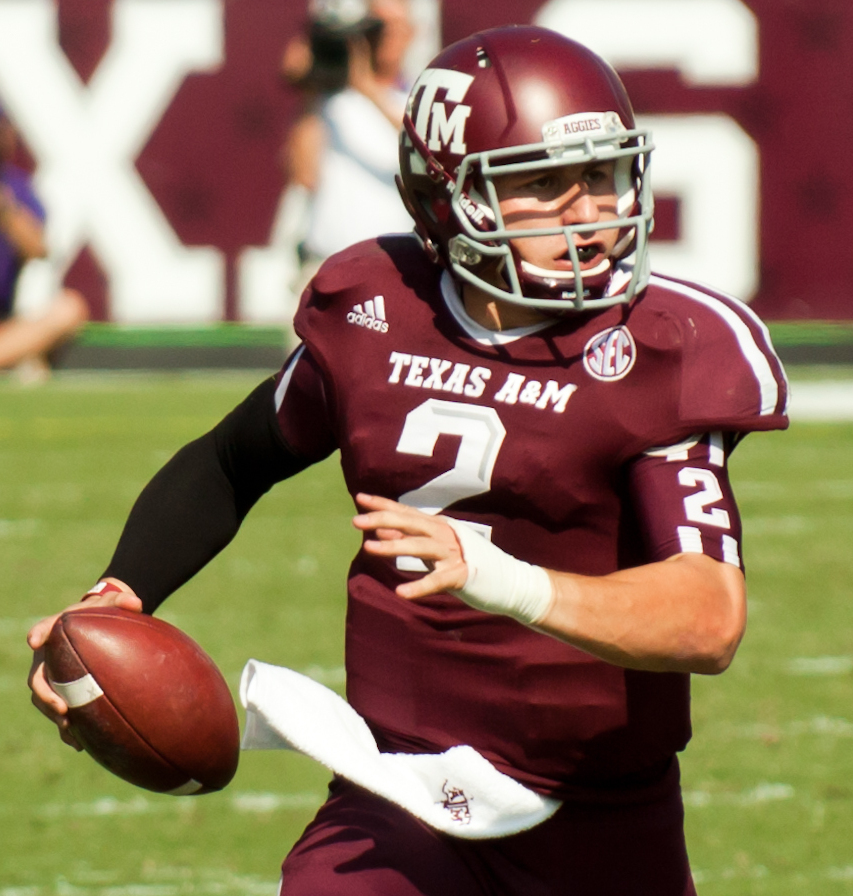
Manziel in 2012 with Texas A&M

Manziel received an athletic scholarship to attend Texas A&M University, where he attended under coach Mike Sherman in 2011 and played for new coach Kevin Sumlin from 2012 to 2013.

Manziel was redshirted during the 2011 season and did not play in any games. He made the travel squad after enrolling with the college in January.

=== 2012 season ===
Texas A&M faced uncertainty at the quarterback position when Ryan Tannehill left for the National Football League after the 2011 season.

On June 29, 2012, Manziel was arrested and charged with three misdemeanors: disorderly conduct, failure to produce identification, and possession of a fictitious driver's license. These charges stemmed from a late-night fight in College Station, Texas. Police reports stated that Manziel was with a friend who directed a racial slur at a man on the street. The man then approached the two of them and tried to get at the friend, but Manziel placed himself between the two men, saying his friend didn't mean it and he was going to take him home. The man continued pushing against Manziel to reach the other man, and Manziel eventually pushed back. At this point, the man swung at Manziel who then began fighting back. Shortly afterwards, the bicycle patrol officers arrived. Manziel was 19 at the time, and he presented to police officers a fake Louisiana driver's license that showed him to be 21 years of age. Manziel was taken into custody and reportedly spent the night in jail.

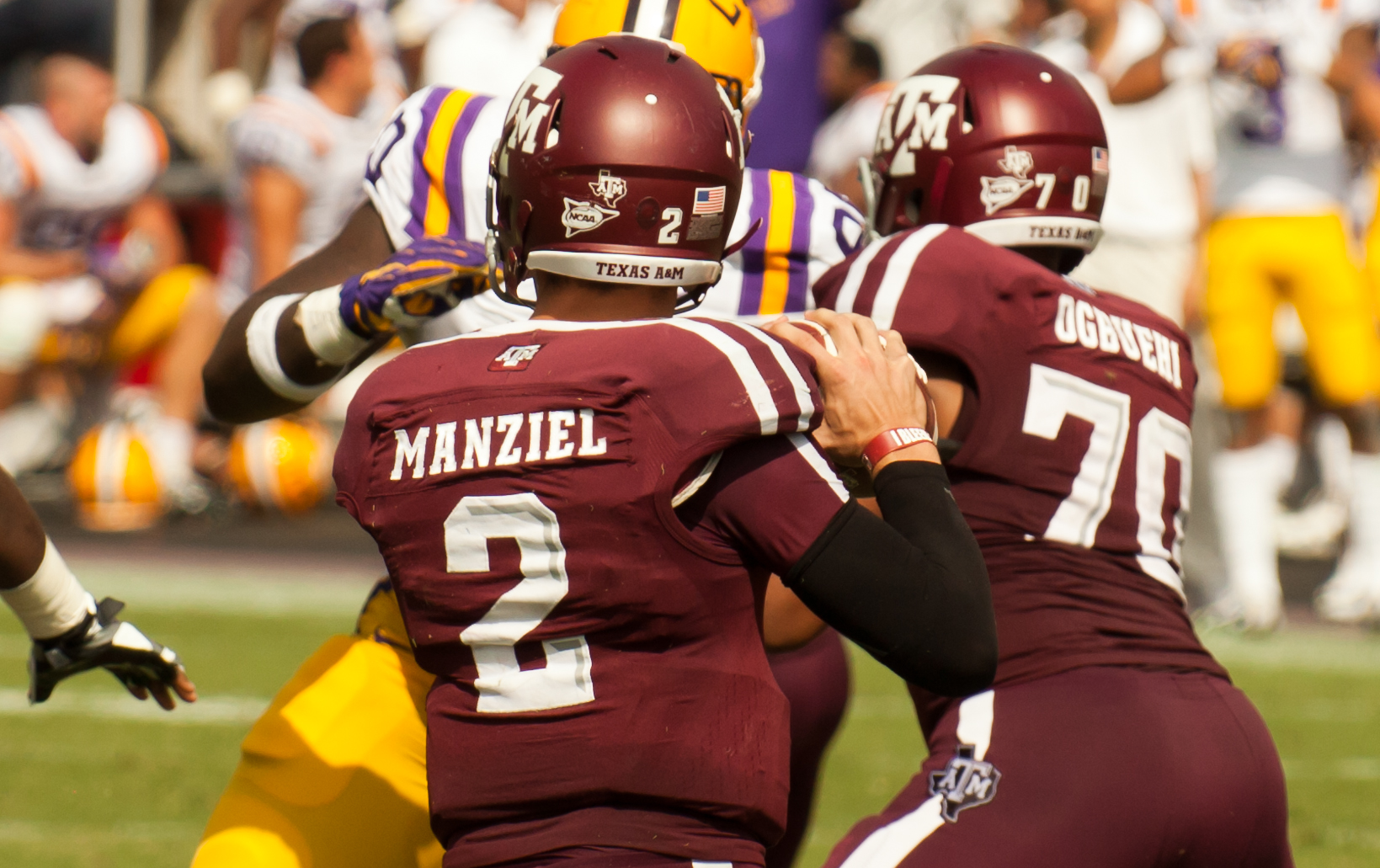
Manziel playing against LSU on October 20, 2012

Manziel, after performing well during spring ball and fall practices, won the starting job over Jameill Showers and Matt Joeckel before the season began. His first game was supposed to be against Louisiana Tech in Shreveport, Louisiana on Thursday, August 30, 2012, but the game was postponed until October 13 due to Hurricane Isaac hitting the Louisiana coast two days prior to game time. Consequently, Manziel's college football debut was played as a redshirt freshman against the Florida Gators before a home crowd at Kyle Field.

Although Manziel began the season in relative obscurity, his play against Arkansas in which he broke Archie Manning's 43-year-old total offense record gained him some attention. Manziel produced 557 yards of total offense, breaking Manning's record of 540. Two games later, Manziel surpassed his own total offense record against No. 24 Louisiana Tech by achieving 576 yards of total offense, becoming the first player in Southeastern Conference (SEC) history to have two 500+ total offense games in one season. After Texas A&M's blowout of Auburn in the eighth game of the season, in which Manziel accounted for three passing and two rushing touchdowns through only the first half plus one series in the second, Manziel began showing up in national Heisman Watch lists.

Manziel was launched into the national scene after he led Texas A&M to a 29–24 victory over No. 1 Alabama in Tuscaloosa. In that game, Manziel accounted for 345 of A&M's 418 yards of offense, including two passing touchdowns. In the following days, Manziel became the frontrunner for the Heisman Trophy in most national watch lists and polls due to his performance during the game combined with other Heisman frontrunners faltering.

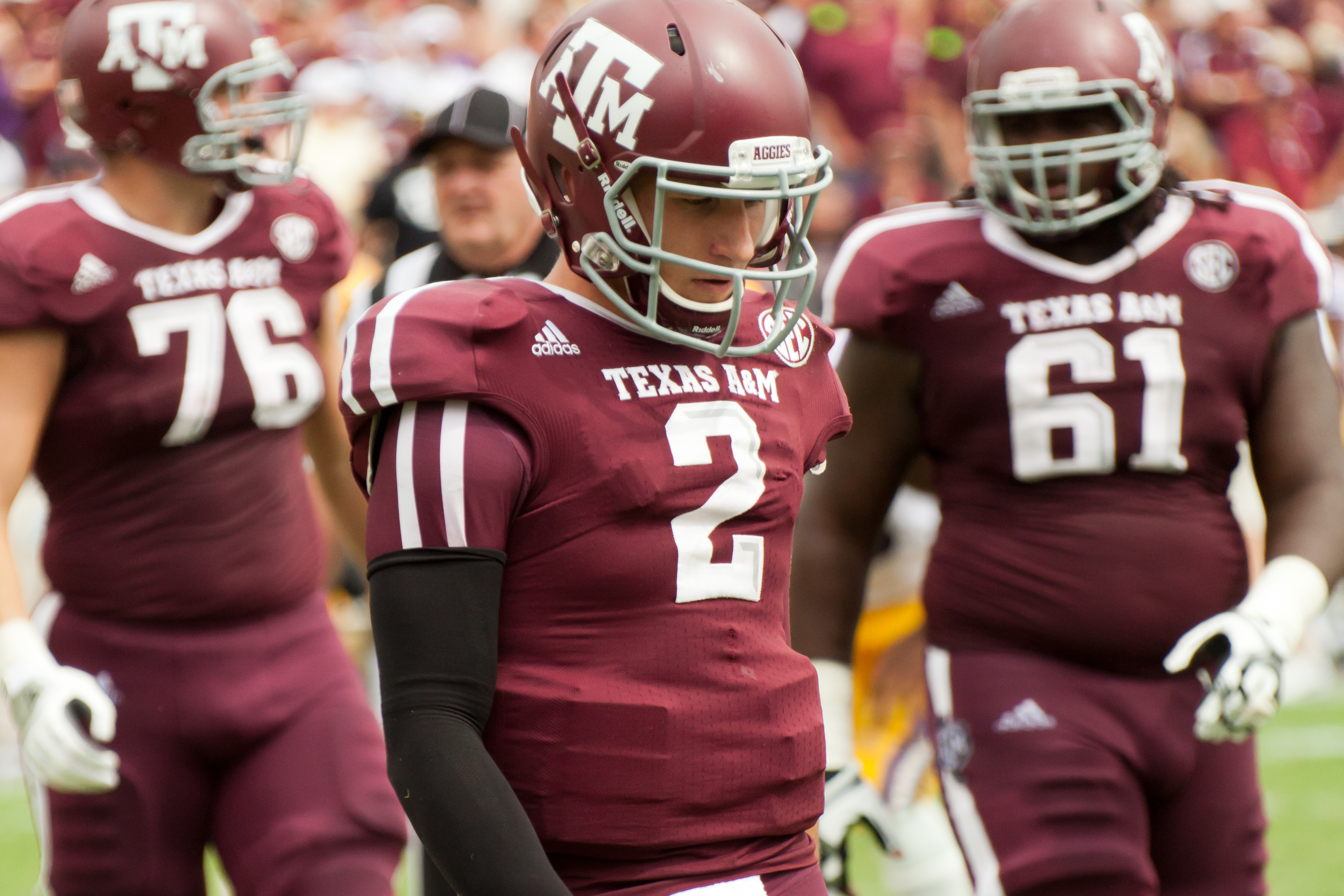
Manziel with Texas A&M teammates Luke Joeckel (76) and Patrick Lewis (61) in 2012

On November 24, during the game against the Missouri Tigers before a home crowd, Manziel left the game with an apparent knee injury late in the first quarter. He returned to the field for the next series of downs wearing a knee brace and finished the game with 439 yards of total offense, including three passing and two rushing touchdowns. During the game, he broke the single-season record for offensive production in the SEC with 4,600 yards, surpassing Cam Newton and Tim Tebow, notable recent Heisman Trophy winners. He also became the first freshman and only the fifth player in NCAA history to pass for 3,000 and rush for 1,000 yards in a season, reaching that mark two games earlier than any other player. He won the SEC Freshman of the Year Award and College Football Performance National Freshman of the Year Award. Manziel won the Davey O'Brien Award on December 6 and the Heisman Trophy on December 8, making him the first freshman ever to win either award.

=== 2013 season ===
During the 2013 offseason at Texas A&M, Manziel drew significant media attention over his behavior off the field. Notable incidents include his early departure from the Manning Passing Academy after allegedly oversleeping, tweeting that he "can't wait to leave College Station" after receiving a parking ticket, and getting kicked out of a University of Texas fraternity party. An ESPN The Magazine article revealed his parents' concerns about his dealings with his newfound stardom. In July 2013, he pleaded guilty to failure to produce identification stemming from the June 2012 arrest, and the other two charges were dismissed.

On August 4, ESPN reported that the NCAA was investigating whether Manziel accepted payments for autographs that he had signed in January 2013. The NCAA did not find any evidence that Manziel accepted money for the autographs, but reached an agreement with Texas A&M to suspend him for the first half of the season opener against Rice University, due to an "inadvertent violation" of NCAA rules.

Texas A&M started the 2013 season with a No. 6 ranking in the Coaches Poll. Prior to the season, some journalists argued that Manziel could suffer a sophomore slump, while others felt that he would continue to have success.

After serving his suspension in the first half of the opener against the Rice Owls, Manziel came off the bench in the second half and threw for three touchdowns to help the Aggies win 52–31. However, after his last touchdown pass, he was called for an unsportsmanlike conduct penalty for taunting Rice players and was subsequently benched by head coach Kevin Sumlin. This action led to high backlash from the media and ESPN analysts over his egotistical behavior, with some calling him a "detriment" to his football team.

In the game against No. 1 Alabama, Manziel threw for a school record of 464 yards and five touchdowns in the 49–42 loss. His primary target during the game was Mike Evans, who compiled seven receptions for a school record of 279 yards. In the 51–41 win over Mississippi State, Manziel tied his single-game career-high five touchdowns, while also throwing for 446 yards but with three interceptions. He led the Aggies to an 8–4 mark in the regular season. In his final collegiate game, he had 382 yards, four passing touchdowns, and one rushing touchdown in the 52–48 win over Duke in the Chick-fil-A Bowl. He helped lead the Aggies to a comeback from a 38–17 halftime deficit. He was fifth in Heisman Trophy voting in 2013.

Manziel was inducted into the Texas A&M Athletics Hall of Fame in September 2022.

== Baseball ==
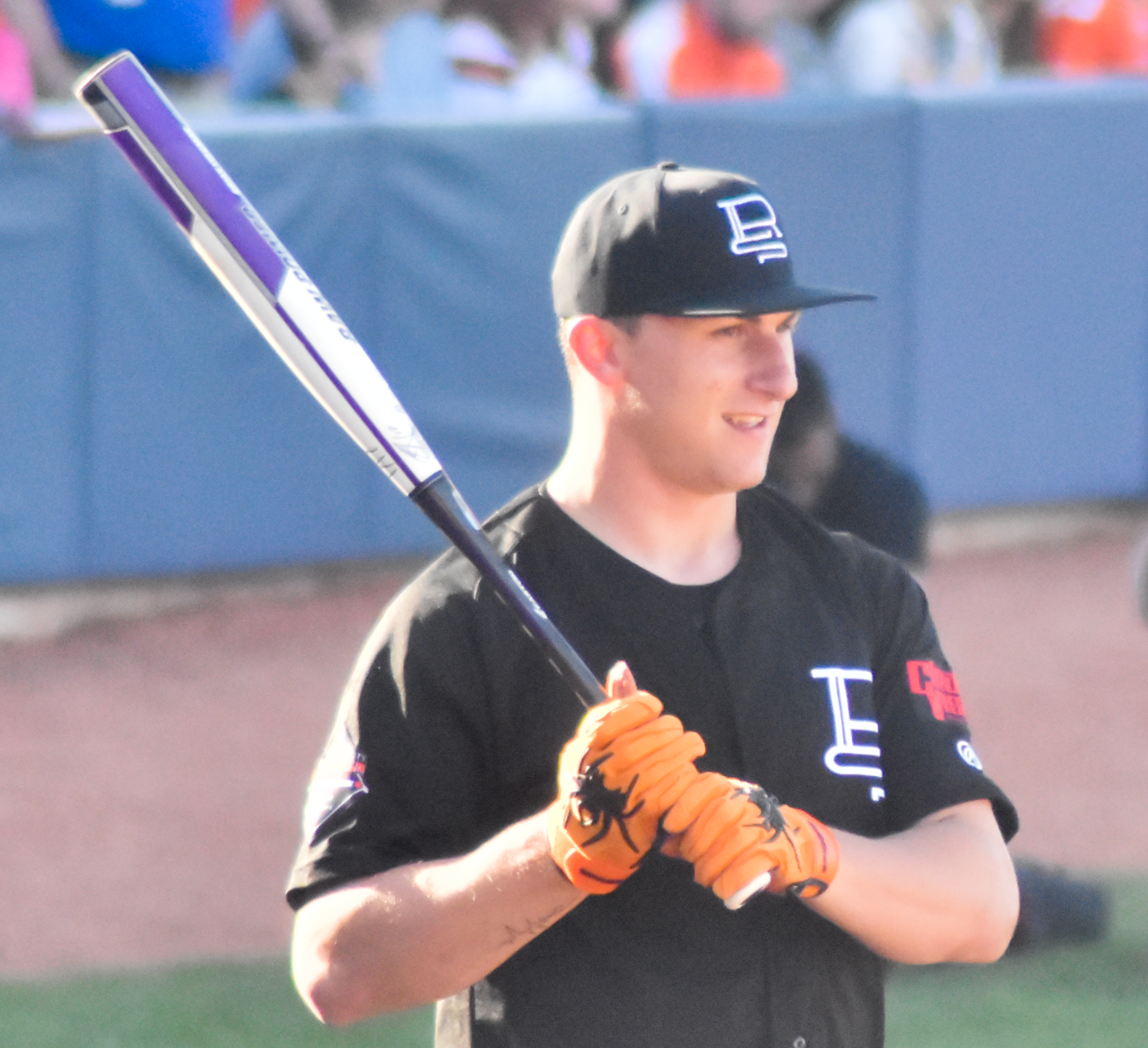
Manziel at the Joe Haden Charity Softball Game, June 2015

As a Texas Rangers fan growing up, Manziel was a middle infielder at Tivy High School before forgoing his baseball career in favor of football. He played baseball through his junior year, but he skipped out on his senior season so he could graduate early and focus on preparing for his freshman football season at Texas A&M.

Manziel's passion for the game of baseball, however, did not diminish after high school. He briefly discussed the possibility of playing collegiate ball with Texas A&M's baseball coaches, but that never came to fruition once he won the starting quarterback job as a redshirt freshman.

In the 2014 Major League Baseball draft, Manziel was drafted in the 28th round (837th overall pick) by the San Diego Padres as a shortstop.

== Professional career ==
=== Pre-draft ===
Pre-draft measurables
Height	Weight	Arm length	Hand span	40-yard dash	10-yard split	20-yard split	20-yard shuttle	Three-cone drill	Vertical jump	Broad jump	Wonderlic
5 ft 11 3/4 in (1.82 m)	207 lb (94 kg)	31 3/8 in (0.80 m)	9 7/8 in (0.25 m)	4.68 s	1.63 s	2.72 s	4.03 s	6.75 s	31.5 in (0.80 m)	9 ft 5 in (2.87 m)	32
All values from the NFL Combine

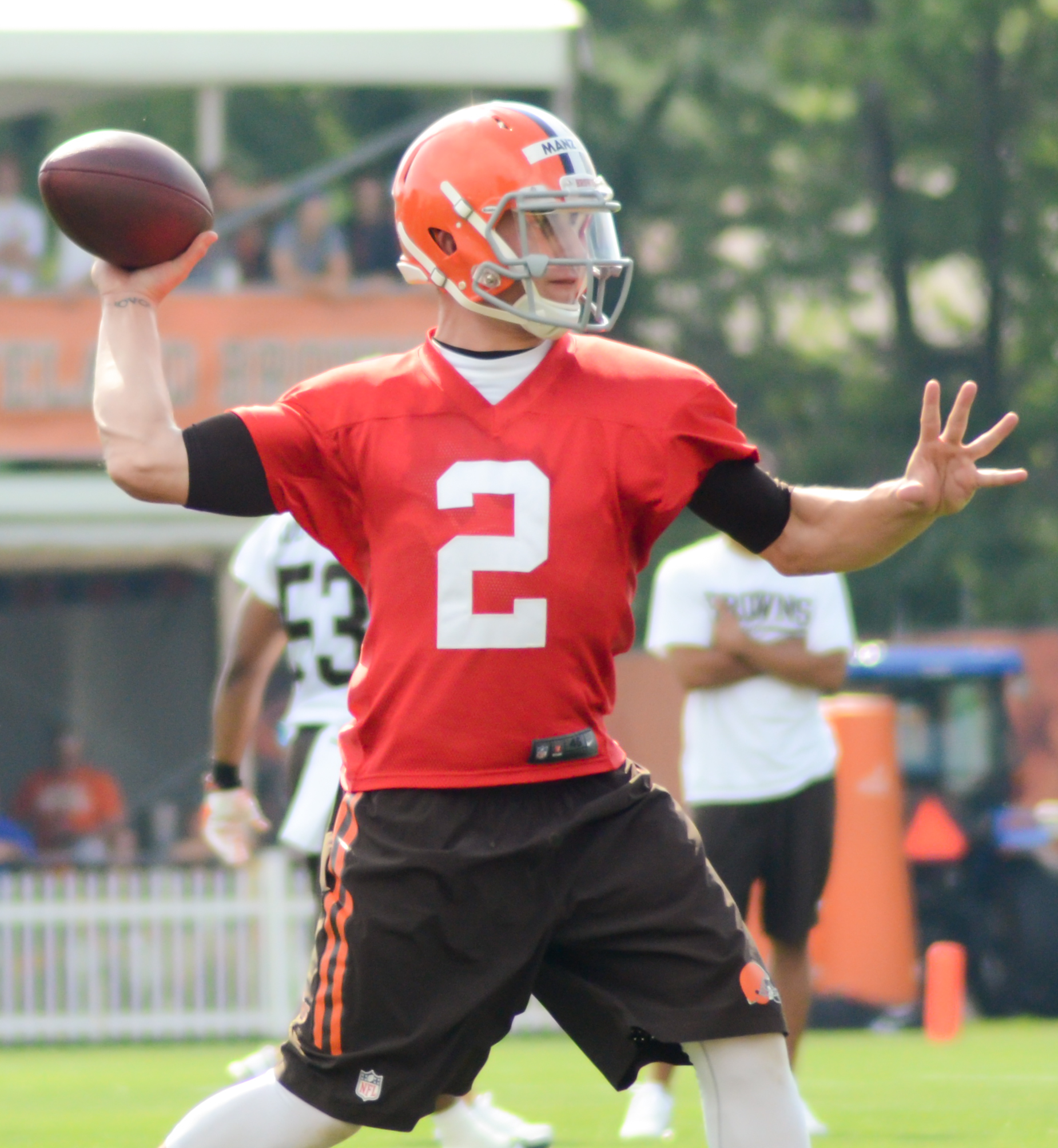
Manziel at Browns training camp in 2014

In January 2014, Manziel announced that he would forgo his junior season and enter the 2014 NFL draft. He was projected to be a first-round pick, and as of January 15, 2014, his draft stock was reported to be rising by a consensus of experts who had him pegged as a top-five pick. Manziel elected to throw during Texas A&M's Pro Day on March 27, 2014, instead of during the NFL Combine. During his pro day, Manziel completed 64 of 66 passes to six different receivers. His pro day performance was well received by sports journalists.

Prior to the 2014 NFL draft, Manziel became one of the most polarizing athletes in pre-draft history, with scouting opinions varying from "undraftable" to "rare competitor". Former NFL head coach Barry Switzer took it to a personal level, criticizing Manziel, saying: "I don't like his antics. I think he's an arrogant little prick. I've said that and I'll say it again."

=== Cleveland Browns (2014–2015) ===
==== 2014 season ====
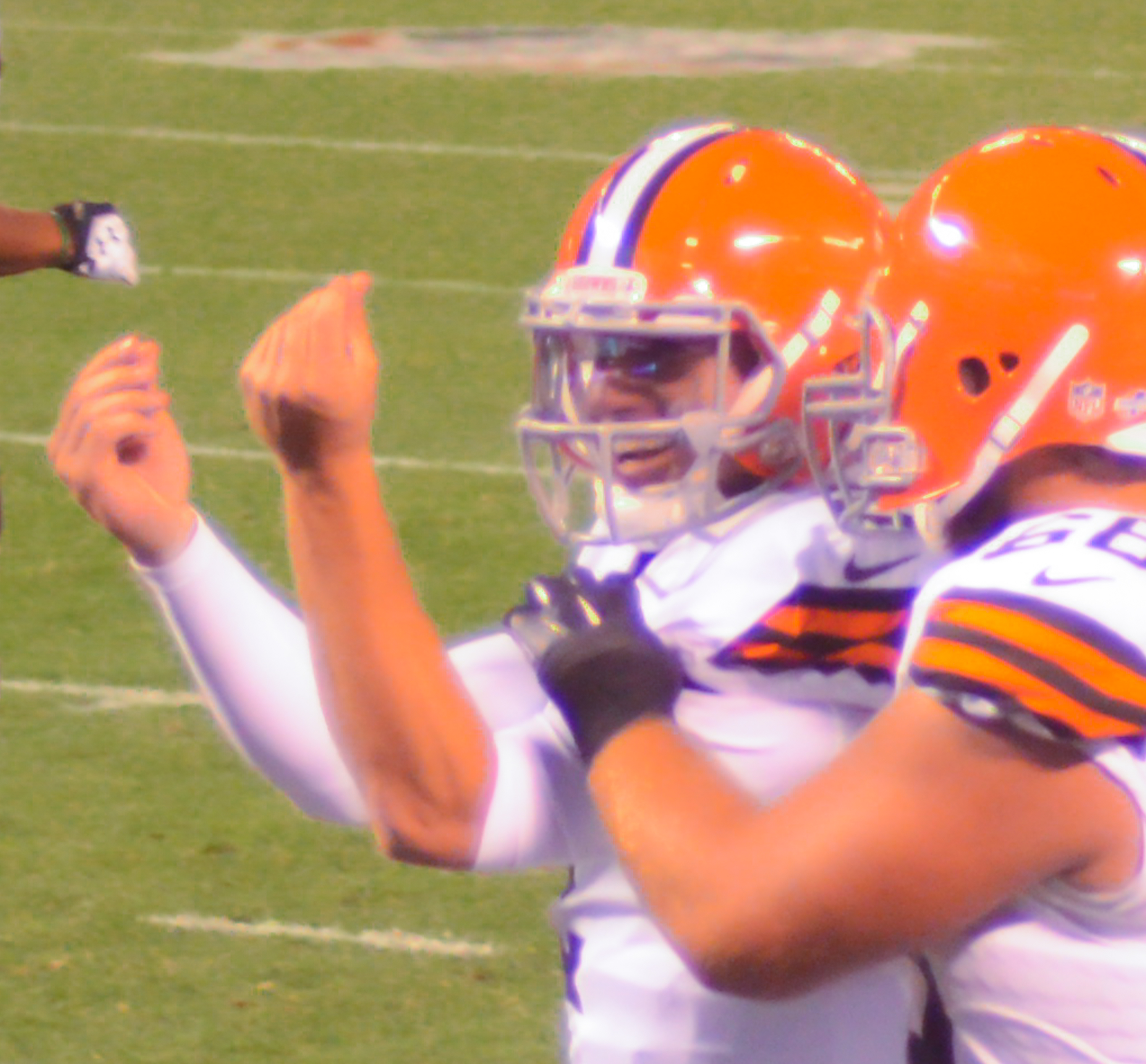
Manziel performing his signature money sign in 2014

On draft day, 21 teams, including the Cleveland Browns, passed over Manziel. While Manziel was waiting to get drafted, he texted then-Browns quarterbacks coach Dowell Loggains that he wanted to "wreck the league" in Cleveland. Loggains forwarded the text to head coach Mike Pettine, who made the decision to trade up to draft Manziel. The Browns drafted him at the 22nd overall pick; at 5'11 3/4", he was the shortest quarterback drafted in the first round until Kyler Murray in 2019.

On August 22, 2014, Manziel was fined $12,000 by the NFL for a hand gesture (flipping the bird) that he made in a preseason loss to the Washington Redskins. Fellow quarterback Brian Hoyer was named the starter over Manziel for the opening regular-season game.

On November 30, 2014, Manziel entered the game against the Buffalo Bills during the fourth quarter after an ineffective performance by Hoyer. Manziel went 5 of 8 for 63 yards, and scored his first NFL touchdown on a 10-yard rush in the fourth quarter. The Browns lost 26–10.

Manziel made his first NFL start in the Browns' Week 15 game against the Cincinnati Bengals. Manziel completed 10 of 18 passes for 80 yards and two interceptions for a 27.3 passer rating while being sacked three times. The Browns lost 30–0.

Manziel completed three of eight passes in his second career start against the Carolina Panthers on December 21, 2014. He left the game with a hamstring injury with less than two minutes remaining in the first half and was replaced by Hoyer. The Browns went on to lose 17–13.

Manziel was ruled out for the Browns' regular season finale against the Baltimore Ravens.

Overall, Manziel completed 18 of 35 passes for 176 yards and two interceptions, and rushed nine times for 29 yards and one touchdown. Manziel's work ethic and commitment were questioned by over 20 sources within the Browns. An anonymous player even called Manziel's rookie season a "100 percent joke." Others within the organization were hopeful about Manziel's future, including cornerback Joe Haden.

==== 2015 season ====
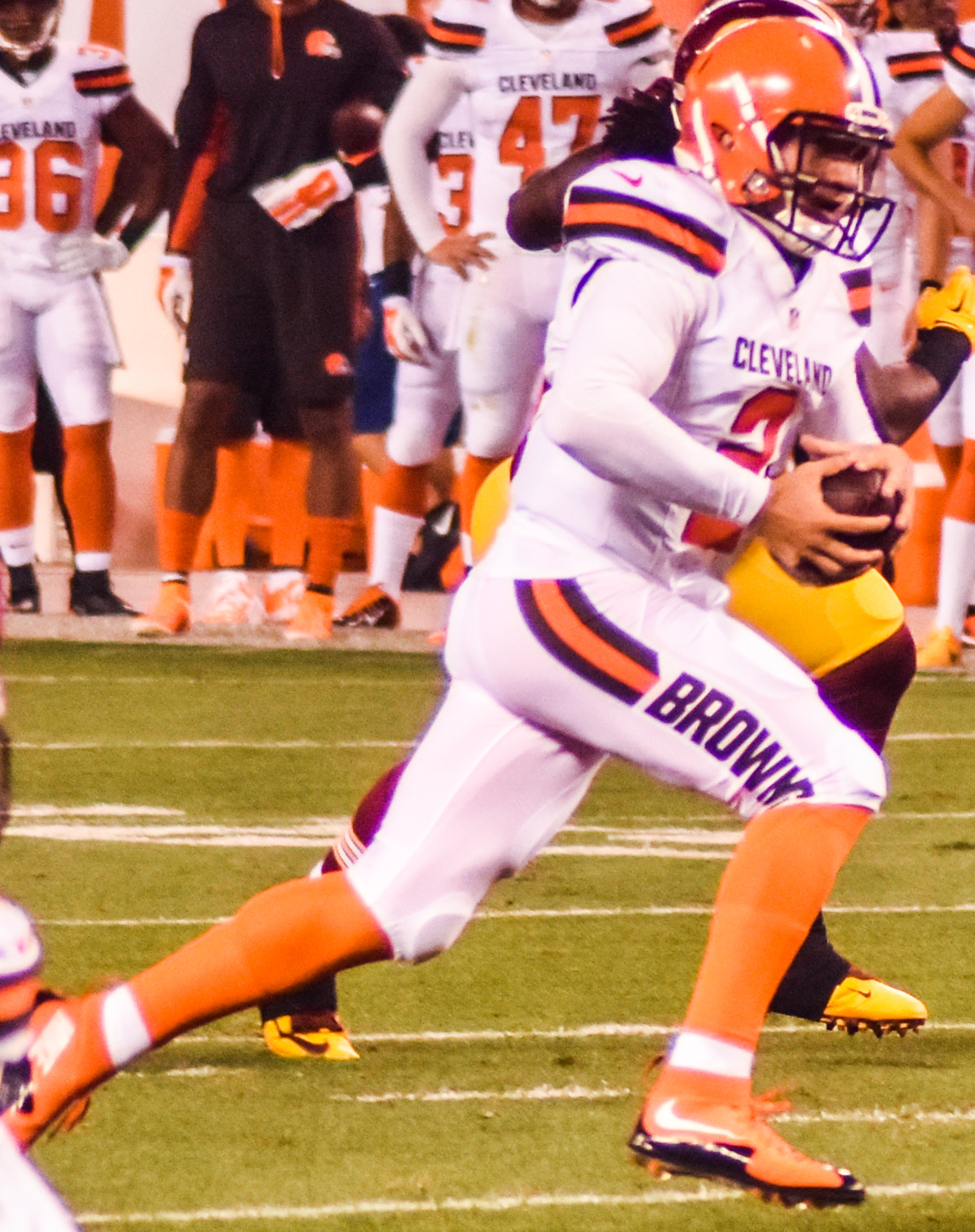
Manziel in a 2015 preseason game

On February 4, 2015, Manziel entered a treatment program for unspecified reasons. On May 30, Manziel was involved in an incident with a heckler at the AT&T Byron Nelson golf tournament. The heckler had been continually asking for an autograph, to the point that Manziel became fed up and threw a water bottle at the man. The water bottle missed the heckler. Security and police were called, but no criminal charges were filed.

On August 27, Manziel was ruled out for the rest of the preseason with recurring pain in his right elbow. Manziel had been making noticeable improvement in his play.

On September 13, Manziel was brought into the game against the New York Jets after starting quarterback Josh McCown was injured in the first half. Manziel scored his first career passing touchdown with a 54-yard pass to wide receiver Travis Benjamin. However, Manziel committed three turnovers in the second half (two of them being fumbles) as the Jets won 31–10. Manziel started the Week 2 game against 2014 Heisman Trophy winner Marcus Mariota and the Tennessee Titans. He completed 8 of 15 passes for 172 yards and two touchdowns to Benjamin in the 28–14 win.

Following McCown's recovery, Manziel did not take the field again until McCown suffered a shoulder injury in the fourth quarter of a Week 7 game against the St. Louis Rams. Manziel completed 4 of 5 passes for 27 yards in a 24–6 loss. In October 2015, Manziel was pulled over by a policeman after fighting in his car with his then-girlfriend, Colleen Crowley. Although no charges were made, Manziel admitted to having had some alcoholic drinks earlier that afternoon. In a Week 8 game against the Arizona Cardinals, Manziel again took the field in the fourth quarter after McCown suffered another injury. Manziel made his second start of the season in Week 9, completing 15 of 33 passes for 168 yards and one touchdown in a 31–10 loss to the Bengals. In Week 10, Manziel had his statistically best game against the Pittsburgh Steelers, completing 33 of 45 passes for 372 yards and one touchdown. Despite his efforts, however, the Browns lost 30–9.

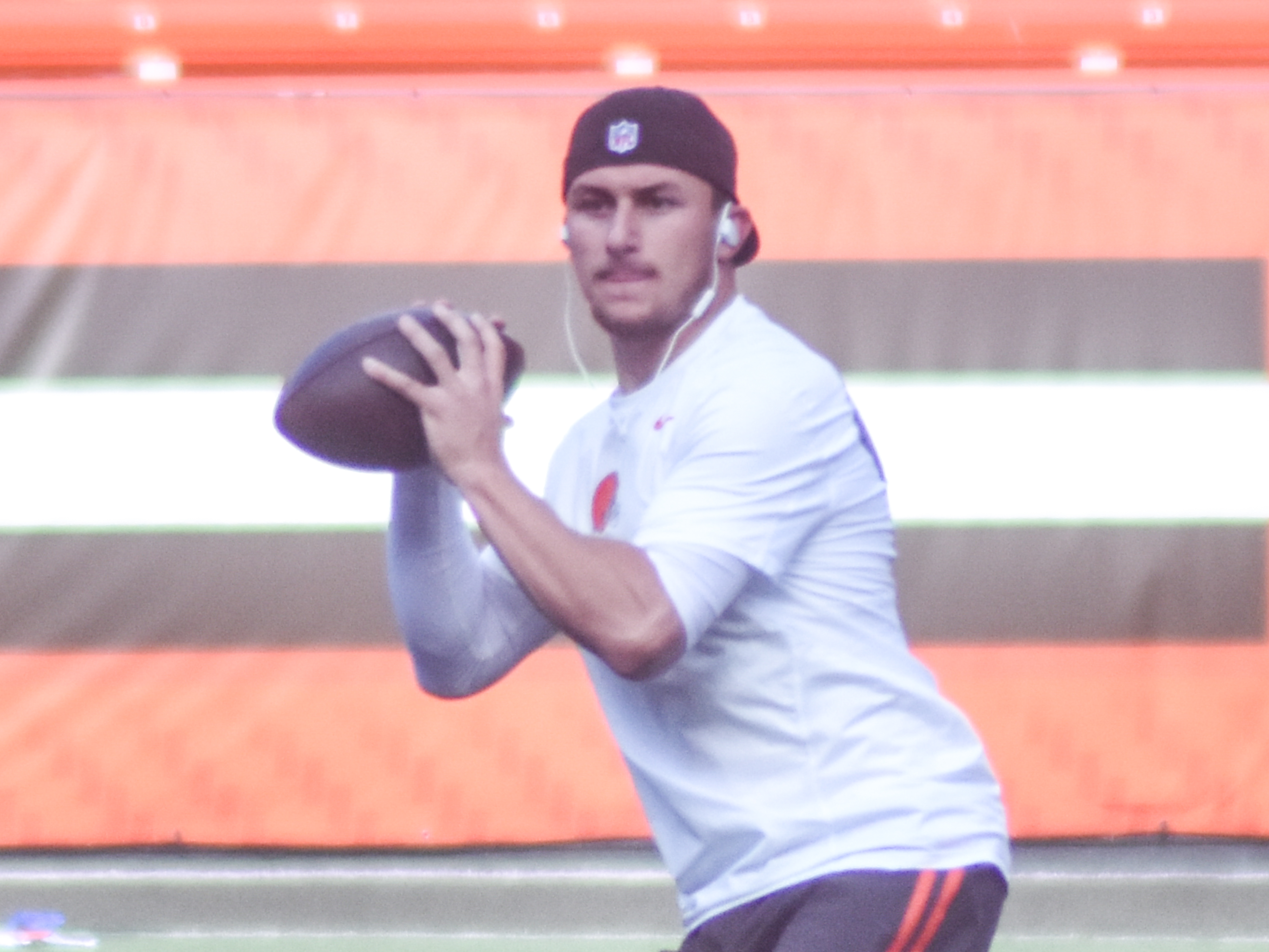
Manziel warming up in 2015

Manziel was announced as the starting quarterback for the rest of the season on November 17. However, he was demoted to third-string quarterback behind McCown and Austin Davis a week later after videos surfaced of him partying in Texas over the bye week. As a result, Manziel remained benched in favor of Davis when McCown suffered a season-ending collarbone injury in the subsequent game against the Ravens. Manziel was promoted to starter again after the Bengals defeated the Davis-led Browns 37–3. Despite throwing a maligned interception in his return performance, Manziel completed 21 of 31 passes for 270 yards and one touchdown in a 24–10 victory over the San Francisco 49ers, ending the Browns' seven-game losing streak.

Manziel sat out the last game of the 2015 season with a concussion, with reports circulating that he was in Las Vegas instead of in Cleveland with the team that weekend. The team confirmed that Manziel did miss a scheduled check-in on the morning of the last game of the season. Sports Illustrated's Peter King also added that the Browns are "so done with Manziel" and he "wants to go to Dallas."

==== 2016 offseason ====
On January 6, 2016, Manziel's marketing agency, LRMR, announced that it would no longer work with Manziel. On February 5, 2016, the Dallas Police Department announced that they were opening a criminal investigation with a claim of domestic violence involving his ex-girlfriend, Colleen Crowley. Dallas police had originally closed the case, but re-opened it with allegations stemming from an altercation on January 30, 2016, at a downtown Dallas hotel. According to Crowley, Manziel forced her into a car, pulled her by the hair, and threatened to kill both her and himself.

In early February 2016, NFL Network's Ian Rappaport and ESPN's Pat McManamon reported that the Browns planned to cut ties with Manziel as soon as the league's fiscal 2016 began. The Browns released a statement saying that Manziel's continued disregard of their "expectations for our players on and off the field" had undermined the Browns' reputation, and that they intended to address his status "as soon as permitted by league rules". Manziel was released by the Browns on March 11, 2016.

=== Free agency (2016) ===
On April 19, 2016, after just two months of representing him, agent Drew Rosenhaus terminated Manziel as a client, marking the first time in Rosenhaus' 27-year career he terminated his relationship with an NFL player. On the same day, Nike ended its sponsorship with Manziel. On April 24, Manziel was indicted by a Dallas grand jury on misdemeanor assault charges for the January 30, 2016, incident.

On June 24, 2016, Manziel's attorney, Bob Hinton, accidentally sent a lengthy text message to the AP relating to Manziel's defense in his domestic violence case. In the message, Hinton expressed concerns about Manziel's ability to stay clean, saying that he was given a receipt that suggests Manziel spent around $1,000 at The Gas Pipe, a drug paraphernalia store. On the same day, Manziel's father, Paul, told ESPN: "He's a druggie. It's not a secret that he's a druggie. Hopefully, he doesn't die before he comes to his senses. I mean, I hate to say it, but I hope he goes to jail. I mean, that would be the best place for him. I'm doing my job, and I'm going to move on. If I have to bury him, I'll bury him." On February 5, Manziel's agent, Erik Burkhardt, announced that he would no longer represent Manziel.

On June 30, 2016, he was suspended for the first four games of the 2016 season for violating the NFL's substance abuse policy. On September 5, Manziel returned to his alma mater to take classes.

On December 2, 2016, Manziel and prosecutors finalized a plea agreement in which Manziel agreed to undergo counseling and have his conduct monitored by prosecutors for up to a year or face prosecution.

=== Hamilton Tiger-Cats (2017–2018) ===
==== Negotiations ====
On March 31, 2017, the Hamilton Tiger-Cats of the Canadian Football League (CFL) revealed that they had placed Manziel on their negotiation list, a list of players that each team has exclusive rights to attempt to sign. The revelation was an unprecedented move, as CFL teams had previously kept their negotiation lists secret.

After a year out of football, Manziel had a workout in Buffalo, New York, with the Tiger-Cats, during which he was "put through a series of physical and medical tests" from August 23 to 24, 2017. He did not initially sign with the team. On September 2, Manziel's representatives requested a contract offer from the Tiger-Cats. According to CFL rules, the Tiger-Cats then had 10 days to offer Manziel a contract, trade his rights or relinquish his rights. However, the CFL later extended the 10-day window so that the league could "facilitate a process of evaluation for the player". Manziel also had a meeting with CFL commissioner Randy Ambrosie in September. On September 27, the CFL announced that Manziel would not be allowed to sign with any CFL team for the 2017 season but would be able to sign with a team for the 2018 season if he met "certain conditions".

On December 28, 2017, the CFL approved Manziel to play in the league. The Tiger-Cats had until January 7 to offer him a contract or trade his rights. If neither was done, the team would lose his rights. On January 7, the team confirmed that they had made Manziel an offer. Not long after, Manziel's agent, Eric Burkhardt, responded to the Tiger-Cats offer stating that Hamilton had until January 31, 2018, to offer his client a "fair deal". Failure to do so would result in Manziel turning his attention to "several other professional options". Burkhardt insisted that Manziel be paid in the same realm as Tiger-Cats' quarterback Zach Collaros was the previous season; i.e., in the range of $500,000 to $550,000. The Tiger-Cats released a statement on February 14 implying they had broken off negotiations with Manziel. The same day, Manziel agreed to play in The Spring League, a non-paying developmental league, for the 2018 season. He was the quarterback at Texas A&M's 2018 pro day, throwing passes to potential 2018 NFL draft prospects in front of representatives from all 32 NFL teams and the CFL. After the session, Manziel reiterated that his primary goal was to play in the NFL in 2018, but if that did not occur he would play in the CFL.

==== Signing and 2018 season ====
On May 19, 2018, Manziel and the Tiger-Cats announced that they had agreed to a two-year contract.

=== Montreal Alouettes (2018) ===
On July 22, after spending the first six weeks on Hamilton's bench without playing, as backup to Jeremiah Masoli, the Tiger-Cats traded Manziel and offensive linemen Tony Washington and Landon Rice to the Montreal Alouettes for defensive lineman Jamaal Westerman, wide receiver Chris Williams, and Montreal's 2020 and 2021 first-round draft picks. Hamilton coach June Jones stated Manziel was traded to give him a better chance at receiving playing time, while the development of quarterback Dane Evans was also a factor in the trade. On July 31, Alouettes head coach Mike Sherman announced that Manziel would start their August 3 game against the Tiger-Cats, his former team. By halftime of his first CFL start, Manziel had thrown four interceptions, including two to Jumal Rolle. Hamilton defeated Montreal 50–11. Manziel showed improvement and did not throw any interceptions in his second start, a 24–17 loss to the Ottawa Redblacks on August 11. In the third quarter, Manziel, after a 17-yard run, received a hard hit to the head from Ottawa's Jonathan Rose and fumbled the ball at the goal line, where the ball was recovered by Montreal's Kristian Matte for a touchdown. In the days following the game, Manziel missed practice and was placed in the CFL's concussion protocol. Manziel was placed on the injured list and Antonio Pipkin started Montreal's next game at quarterback in Manziel's place. Pipkin started two games while Manziel recovered from his concussion, and then two additional games after Manziel had recovered.

Following a four-interception game by Pipkin in Week 14, Manziel took over the reins as starting quarterback for the Alouettes in Week 15, a game they ended up losing 31–14 to the Winnipeg Blue Bombers. Manziel played in eight games in his first season in the CFL, completing 106 of 165 pass attempts (64.2%) for 1,290 yards with five touchdowns and seven interceptions. He also rushed the ball 29 times for 215 yards. Manziel was said to have struggled during his first season, and NBC Sports writer Michael David Smith said it "wasn't great", despite Manziel's satisfaction with how he played. Manziel's performance throughout the season gradually improved, and was attributed to his becoming accustomed to CFL rules.

Manziel was slated to compete with Pipkin and Vernon Adams for the starting role in 2019, but on February 27 it was revealed that the Alouettes released him on orders from the CFL after league officials determined that he had "contravened" the terms of his CFL contract. The CFL also barred him from signing with any other CFL team. Manziel had previously revealed that as part of his agreement with the league, he was required to see a doctor, attend weekly sessions with a therapist, and submit to weekly lithium tests. According to veteran CFL journalist Justin Dunk, the league decided to cut ties with Manziel after he missed a number of mandatory meetings.

=== Memphis Express (2019) ===
On March 16, 2019, Manziel signed an agreement to join the Alliance of American Football. Under the league's regional allocation process, the San Antonio Commanders had the first opportunity to sign him via his Texas A&M connections, but the Commanders elected to waive his rights. As a result, he was assigned to the 1–5 Memphis Express through the waiver system, as the Express needed a quarterback to replace the injured Zach Mettenberger and the struggling Christian Hackenberg.

Manziel made his debut against the Birmingham Iron on March 24, playing three drives in the second and third quarters as a backup to Brandon Silvers. He completed three of five passes for 48 yards, along with running for 20 yards as the Express won 31–25. The next week, in a March 30 game against the Orlando Apollos, Manziel was removed from the game due to a concussion suffered while attempting to make a tackle after throwing an interception. Three days later, the AAF suspended football operations, ending the 2019 season.

=== Fan Controlled Football (2021–2022) ===
When asked by TMZ in September 2020 about potentially playing in the XFL, Manziel announced his retirement, stating: "I think football is a little bit behind me ... Football for me is not at the forefront of my mind." He did not completely rule out coming out of retirement, praising incoming co-owner Dwayne Johnson and stating "Listen, anything 'The Rock' touches is gonna be gold as always."

On December 30, 2020, Manziel signed with Fan Controlled Football (FCF), an indoor American football league. He was assigned to the Zappers, a team co-owned by his friend Bob Menery. In a February 2021 USA Today interview, Manziel stated he joined the league out of boredom, and expressed disinterest in playing any more professional football in the future.

Manziel played sparingly for the Zappers and missed the week 3 game due to a dental emergency. He was pulled from the semifinal playoff matchup, a game that featured him reuniting with former Browns teammate Josh Gordon, for poor performance.

On March 25, 2022, Manziel announced he would return to FCF for a second season, noting that he will serve as a player-coach for the 2022 season and that the FCF did not pressure him to be the face of the league. The 2022 Zappers won the league title.

== Career statistics ==
Legend
**Bold**	Career high

=== NFL ===
Year	Team	Games			Passing									Rushing					Sacked		Fumbles (Note: Fumbles lost data taken from Pro Football Reference career game log)	
Year	Team	GP	GS	Record	Cmp	Att	Pct	Yds	Y/A	Lng	TD	Int	Rtg	Att	Yds	Y/A	Lng	TD	Sck	SckY	Fum	Lost
2014	CLE	5	2	0–2	18	35	51.4	175	5.0	32	0	2	42.0	9	29	3.2	10	**1**	3	26	1	0
2015	CLE	**10**	**6**	**2–4**	**129**	**223**	**57.8**	**1,500**	**6.7**	**61**	**7**	**5**	**79.4**	**37**	**230**	**6.2**	**34**	0	**19**	**141**	**6**	**3**
Career		15	8	2–6	147	258	57.0	1,675	6.5	61	7	7	74.4	46	259	5.6	34	1	22	167	7	3

=== Spring League (2018) ===
Team	Games	Passing							Rushing
Team	Games	Cmp	Att	Pct	Yds	Y/A	TD	Int	TD
South	Apr 7	9	15	60.0	82	5.5	**1**	0	0
South	Apr 12	**10**	**16**	**62.5**	**188**	**11.8**	0	**1**	**2**
Career		19	31	61.3	270	8.7	1	1	2

=== CFL ===
Year	Team	GP	Passing									Rushing					Sacked	
Year	Team	GP	Cmp	Att	Pct	Yds	Y/A	Lng	TD	Int	Rtg	Att	Yds	Y/A	Lng	TD	Sck	SckY
2018	HAM	5	0	0	—	0	—	0	0	0	—	0	0	—	0	**0**	0	0
2018	MTL	**11**	**106**	**165**	**64.2**	**1,290**	**7.8**	**52**	**5**	**7**	**80.6**	**29**	**215**	**7.4**	**25**	**0**	**21**	**183**
Career		16	106	165	64.2	1,290	7.8	52	5	7	80.6	29	215	7.4	25	0	21	183

=== AAF ===
Year	Team	Passing									Rushing					Sacked	
Year	Team	Cmp	Att	Pct	Yds	Y/A	Lng	TD	Int	Rtg	Att	Yds	Y/A	Lng	TD	Sck	SckY
2019	MEM	**5**	**8**	**62.5**	**61**	**7.6**	**36**	**0**	**1**	**46.4**	**5**	**38**	**7.6**	**13**	**0**	**1**	**9**
Career		5	8	62.5	61	7.6	36	0	1	46.4	5	38	7.6	13	0	1	9

=== FCF ===
Year	Team	GP	Passing							Rushing			
Year	Team	GP	Cmp	Att	Pct	Yds	Y/A	TD	Int	Att	Yds	Y/A	TD
2021	ZAP	**3**	**14**	**27**	**51.9**	**133**	**4.9**	1	**0**	**13**	**104**	**10.4**	**2**
2022	ZAP	2	10	23	43.5	112	**4.9**	**2**	**0**	6	19	3.2	1
Career		5	24	50	48.0	245	4.9	3	0	19	123	6.5	3

=== College ===
Legend
Heisman Trophy

Season	Team	Games			Passing								Rushing		
Season	Team	GP	GS	Record	Cmp	Att	Pct	Yds	TD	Int	Rtg	Att	Yds	Avg	TD
2011	Texas A&M	0	0	—	(redshirt) Redshirted										
2012	Texas A&M	**13**	**13**	**11–2**	295	**434**	68.0	3,706	26	9	155.3	**201**	**1,410**	**7.0**	**21**
2013	Texas A&M	**13**	12	8–4	**300**	429	**69.9**	**4,114**	**37**	**13**	**172.9**	144	759	5.3	9
Total		26	25	19–6	595	863	68.9	7,820	63	22	164.1	345	2,169	6.3	30

== Career highlights ==
=== College honors ===
==== Full-season awards ====
- 2012 Heisman Trophy winner (first freshman to win)
- 2012 Davey O'Brien National Quarterback Award winner (first freshman to win)
- 2012 Manning Award winner (first freshman to win)
- 2012 First-team All-American by:

◦ Associated Press
◦ Football Writers Association of America
◦ Walter Camp Football Foundation
◦ Sporting News
◦ ESPN
◦ CBS Sports
◦ Scout.com
◦ Sports Illustrated

- 2012 Sporting News College Football Player of the Year
- 2012 SEC Offensive Player of the Year
- 2012 SEC Freshman of the Year
- 2012 All-SEC First-team Quarterback
- 2013 Cotton Bowl Classic – Offensive MVP
- 2012 ESPN.com All-Bowl Team
- 2013 SEC Male Athlete of the Year
- 2013 All-SEC First-team Quarterback
- 2013 Chick-fil-A Bowl – Offensive MVP

==== Weekly awards ====
- 2-time Walter Camp National Offensive Player of the Week
- 3-time AT&T All-America Player of the Week
- 4-time SEC Offensive Player of the Week
- 9-time SEC Freshman of the Week

==== NCAA records and notes ====
- FBS freshman record: rushing yards by a quarterback, season (1,410)
- FBS freshman record: total offense, season (5,116)
- 10th-most (at the time) single-season total offensive yards in NCAA FBS history
- Most games with 300 or more passing yards and 100+ rushing yards, career (4)
- FBS record: First freshman (and fifth player ever) in FBS history with 3,000 passing yards and 1,000 rushing yards, season
- FBS record: Rushing yards by a quarterback in a bowl game (229 yards)
- Only the fourth player to have 20 passing TDs and 20 rushing TDs, season
- Eclipsed the 7,000-yard barrier in total offense in his 19th career game, which is the fastest in NCAA FBS history by a four-year player
- Second freshman in FBS history to rush for 1,000 yards and pass for 2,000 yards
- First freshman to win the Heisman Trophy
- First freshman to win the Davey O'Brien National Quarterback Award
- First freshman to win the Manning Award

==== SEC records and notes ====
- Most yards total offense in a game (576, breaking Archie Manning's 1969 record of 540 yards)
  - The first three places on the SEC total offense in a game
    - 576 yards
    - 562 yards against No. 1 Alabama
    - 557 yards two weeks before the 576 yards
- Most yards total offense, season (5,116, breaking Cam Newton's 2010 record in two fewer games)
- 2nd-most yards total offense, season (4,873)
- Most yards total offense, game average (383.3, breaking Tim Couch's 1998 record, of 377.4 yards)
- Highest yards per play average (50 plays minimum), game (10.71, against Arkansas on September 29, 2012, breaking Steve Tanneyhill's record of 10.0 yards)
- First SEC quarterback to pass for 3,000 yards and rush for 1,000 yards in one season
- Second-most passing yards in a SEC single season, 4,114 passing yards
- Tied for third-most passing touchdowns in an SEC single season, 37 touchdowns
- Tied for second most rushing touchdowns in a single season
- Tied for 8th most scoring in a single season
- 8th most passing yards in a single season

==== Texas A&M records and notes ====
- Most total yards in a season with 5,116
- Most yards passing yards in a game
  - The first three spots on the Texas A&M passing yards in a game
    - 464 yards against No. 1 Alabama on September 14, 2013
    - 454 yards against Auburn on October 19, 2013
    - 453 yards against Arkansas on September 29, 2012
- Most yards total offense in a game (576, breaking Archie Manning's 1969 record of 540 yards)
  - The first 3 spots on the Texas A&M total offense in a game
    - 576 yards
    - 562 yards against No. 1 Alabama
    - 557 yards two weeks before the 576 yards
- In 10 games, Manziel had 4 of the top 10 games in total offense in Texas A&M history.
- Logged 10 straight games with 300 or more total yards, 21 total games with 300+ yards.
- Third Texas A&M quarterback to surpass 3,000 passing yards in a season.
- First Texas A&M quarterback to have multiple 3,000-yard seasons.
- Texas A&M career total touchdowns record with 94 touchdowns.
- Texas A&M career total yards record with 9,989 yards.
- Third Texas A&M quarterback to surpass 7,000 passing yards in a career.
- Most passing yards in a single season.
- Second Texas A&M quarterback to rush for 2,000 yards.
- The most rushing touchdowns in a single season.
- The most passing touchdowns in a single season.
- 2nd in career passing touchdowns.
- 2nd in career passing yards.
- Tied for 12th in career rushing touchdowns.
- 15th in career rushing yards.

=== Cleveland Browns records ===
- Cleveland Browns franchise record for most rushing yards by a quarterback in a single game (108)

== Personal life ==
On March 10, 2017, Manziel became engaged to Bre Tiesi; the two were married in a private ceremony in March 2018. Their divorce was finalized in November 2021. Manziel is a friend of rap artist Drake and in April 2014, Drake released a track entitled "Draft Day", which includes a shoutout to Manziel.

In a February 2018 interview, Manziel stated that he had been diagnosed with bipolar disorder.

=== Nickname ===
TexAgs users tagged Manziel with the nickname "Johnny Football" during Manziel's sophomore high school football season in Texas. The nickname followed him to Texas A&M University. Manziel applied for and was granted a registered trademark for the nickname in 2013.

=== Television and film ===
Manziel appears in an episode of Netflix's UNTOLD anthology series, "Johnny Football", which premiered on August 8, 2023. Sports Illustrated called the documentary "bizarre [and] poorly done," criticizing the film's scattered treatment of Manziel's recovery, especially "shots [of Manziel drinking alcohol that] were not only bizarre but also made the lack of substance in the documentary glaringly obvious."

Manziel appeared with Tiesi on Selling Sunset, season 8, episode 6.

=== Podcasts ===
In 2018, Manziel was host of the Comeback SZN podcast with his fellow Texas A&M University alumni Kayce Smith at Barstool Sports. He only lasted a year at the company however and the podcast became the Unnecessary Roughness podcast with Smith, Brandon Walker, and T-Bob Hebert.

=== MMA ===
In May 2026, Manziel ventured into the world of mixed martial arts. He faced internet personality Bob Menery in an amateur bout on May 23 at an event held by Brand Risk Promotions. He won the fight via TKO in the first round.

== See also ==
- List of NCAA major college football yearly total offense leaders
