= Saddle Brook, New Jersey =

Township in Bergen County, New Jersey, US

- Township
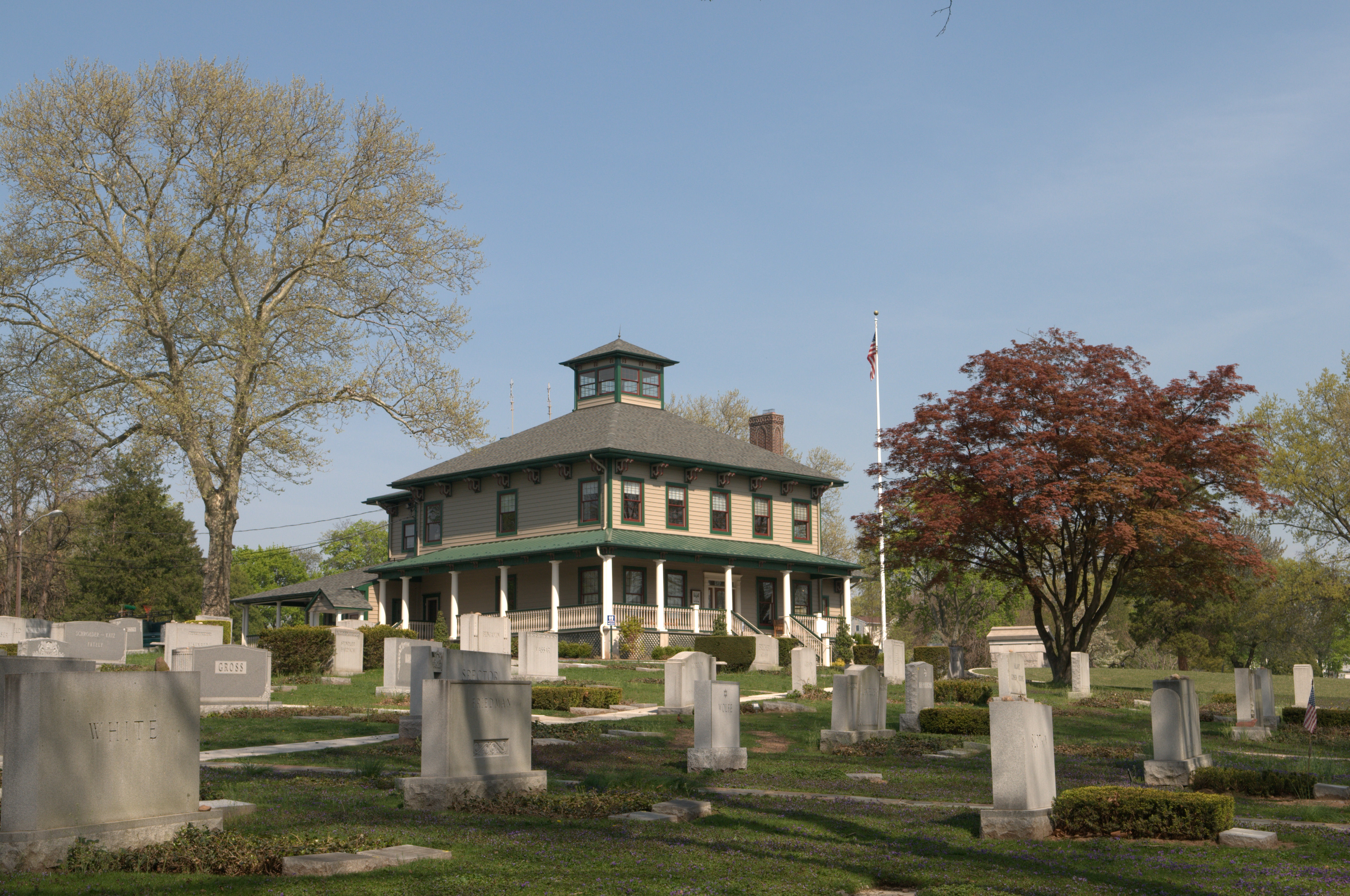
- House in Riverside Cemetery

- Seal

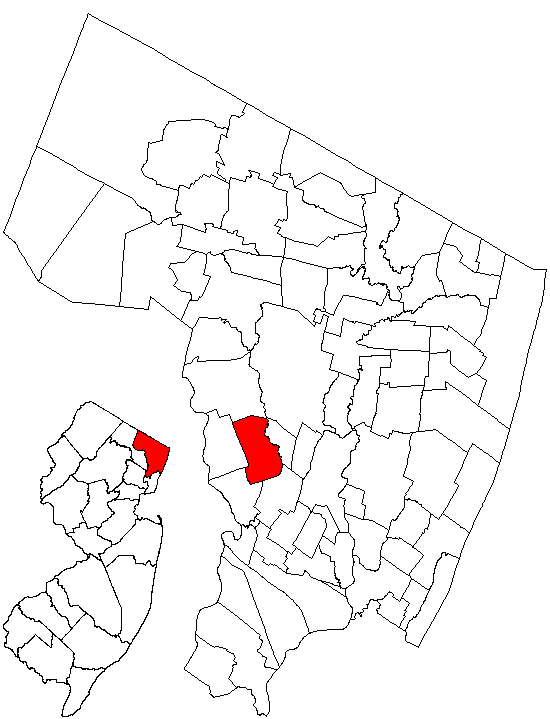
- Location of Saddle Brook in Bergen County highlighted in red (right). Inset map: Location of Bergen County in New Jersey highlighted in red (left).

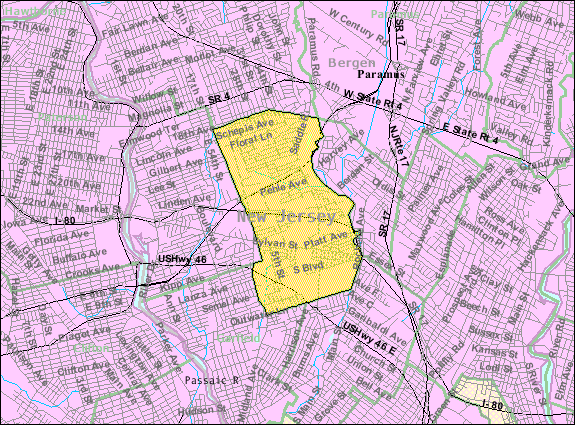
- Census Bureau map of Saddle Brook, New Jersey

- Location in Bergen County Location in New Jersey Location in the United States
- Coordinates: 40.903099°N 74.093591°W
- Country: United States
- State: New Jersey
- County: Bergen
- Incorporated: March 20, 1716 (as Saddle River Township)
- Renamed: November 8, 1955 (as Saddle Brook Township)

Government
  - Type: Faulkner Act (mayor–council)
  - Body: Township Council
  - Mayor: Robert D. White (D, term ends December 31, 2026)
  - Administrator / Municipal clerk: Peter A. LoDico

Area
  - Total: 2.76 sq mi (7.14 km^{2})
  - Land: 2.69 sq mi (6.97 km^{2})
  - Water: 0.066 sq mi (0.17 km^{2}) 2.32%
  - Rank: 360th of 565 in state 33rd of 70 in county
- Elevation: 46 ft (14 m)

Population (2020)
  - Total: 14,294
  - Estimate (2023): 14,386
  - Rank: 185th of 565 in state 25th of 70 in county
  - Density: 5,309.8/sq mi (2,050.1/km^{2})
  - Rank: 104th of 565 in state 28th of 70 in county
- Time zone: UTC−05:00 (Eastern (EST))
  - Summer (DST): UTC−04:00 (Eastern (EDT))
- ZIP Code: 07663
- Area codes: 201 and 973
- FIPS code: 3400365340
- GNIS feature ID: 882308
- Website: www.saddlebrooknj.us

Saddle Brook is a township in Bergen County, in the U.S. state of New Jersey. As of the 2020 United States census, the township's population was 14,294, an increase of 635 (+4.6%) from the 2010 census count of 13,659, which in turn reflected an increase of 504 (+3.8%) from the 13,155 counted in the 2000 census.

== History ==
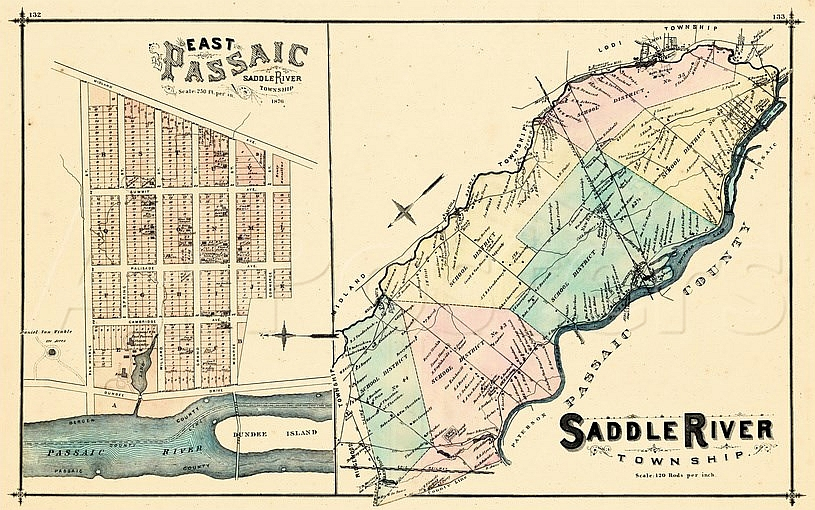
Map of Saddle River Township as of 1876

Before European settlement, the earliest people in the area were the Lenape Native Americans.

Saddle River Township was created on March 20, 1716, consisting of all of the territory in Bergen County west of the Saddle River, making it one of the oldest municipalities in Bergen County, within the area that had been known as New Barbadoes Township, which itself had been set off from Essex County and added to Bergen County in 1710. It was incorporated on February 21, 1798, by the Township Act of 1798 as one of the initial group of 104 townships incorporated in New Jersey. The historic name of the township was from the Saddle River, a tributary of the Passaic River, which in turn was named for a stream and valley in Saddell, Argyll, Scotland. It was bounded on the north by Ridgewood, south by Lodi, east by the Saddle River and west by the Passaic River. In 1724, the Township formally seceded from New Barbadoes.

After its formation in 1716, Saddle River Township was split up in 1772 by royal decree, with the northernmost half becoming Franklin Township, named after the last royal governor of New Jersey, William Franklin, son of Benjamin Franklin. Pompton Township was established in 1797 from parts of both Franklin and Saddle River Townships west of the Ramapo River, leaving sections of both townships disconnected to the west of Pompton Township. West Milford Township was formed from the discontinuous, western sections of both Franklin and Saddle River townships in 1834. Saddle Brook was among the initial group of 104 municipalities formally incorporated under the Township Act of 1798.

In the initial wave of "Boroughitis" in which 26 new boroughs were created in 1894 alone and two more in 1895, Glen Rock (on September 14, 1894) and Lodi (December 22, 1894) split off from Saddle River Township, followed shortly thereafter by Wallington (January 2, 1895). Garfield (March 15, 1898), East Paterson (April 18, 1916; renamed to Elmwood Park, effective January 1, 1973) and Fair Lawn (April 5, 1924) subsequently split off.

Saddle Brook adopted its current name on November 8, 1955, replacing Saddle River Township.

== Geography ==
According to the United States Census Bureau, the township had a total area of 2.76 square miles (7.14 km^{2}), including 2.69 square miles (6.97 km^{2}) of land and 0.06 square miles (0.17 km^{2}) of water (2.32%).

The township borders the Bergen County municipalities of Elmwood Park, Fair Lawn, Garfield, Lodi, Paramus and Rochelle Park.

Unincorporated communities, localities and place names located partially or completely within the township include Coalberg and Passaic Junction.

== Demographics ==
Historical population
Census	Pop.	Note	%±
1810	2,171		—
1820	2,291		5.5%
1830	3,399		48.4%
1840	828	*	−75.6%
1850	823		−0.6%
1860	1,007		22.4%
1870	1,168		16.0%
1880	1,355		16.0%
1890	1,169		−13.7%
1900	1,954	*	67.2%
1910	3,047		55.9%
1920	2,845	*	−6.6%
1930	2,424		−14.8%
1940	3,169		30.7%
1950	7,955		151.0%
1960	13,834		73.9%
1970	15,975		15.5%
1980	14,084		−11.8%
1990	13,296		−5.6%
2000	13,155		−1.1%
2010	13,659		3.8%
2020	14,294		4.6%
2023 (est.)	14,386		0.6%
Population sources: 1800–1920 1840 1850–1870; 1850 1870 1880–1890; 1890–1910 1910–1930; 1900–2020 2000; 2010 2020 * = Lost territory in previous decade.

=== 2020 census ===
Saddle Brook township, Bergen County, New Jersey – Racial and ethnic composition Note: the US Census treats Hispanic/Latino as an ethnic category. This table excludes Latinos from the racial categories and assigns them to a separate category. Hispanics/Latinos may be of any race.
Race / Ethnicity (NH = Non-Hispanic)	Pop 2000	Pop 2010	Pop 2020	% 2000	% 2010	% 2020
White alone (NH)	11,400	10,418	9,554	86.66%	76.27%	66.84%
Black or African American alone (NH)	162	268	442	1.23%	1.96%	3.09%
Native American or Alaska Native alone (NH)	5	8	6	0.04%	0.06%	0.04%
Asian alone (NH)	611	1,102	1,219	4.64%	8.07%	8.53%
Native Hawaiian or Pacific Islander alone (NH)	0	0	2	0.00%	0.00%	0.01%
Other race alone (NH)	20	40	62	0.15%	0.29%	0.43%
Mixed race or Multiracial (NH)	132	157	261	1.00%	1.15%	1.83%
Hispanic or Latino (any race)	825	1,666	2,748	6.27%	12.20%	19.22%
Total	13,155	13,659	14,294	100.00%	100.00%	100.00%

=== 2010 census ===
The 2010 United States census counted 13,659 people, 5,286 households, and 3,690 families in the township. The population density was 5,080.2 per square mile (1,961.5/km^{2}). There were 5,485 housing units at an average density of 2,040.0 per square mile (787.6/km^{2}). The racial makeup was 84.35% (11,521) White, 2.31% (316) Black or African American, 0.16% (22) Native American, 8.21% (1,121) Asian, 0.00% (0) Pacific Islander, 3.19% (436) from other races, and 1.78% (243) from two or more races. Hispanic or Latino of any race were 12.20% (1,666) of the population.

Of the 5,286 households, 28.1% had children under the age of 18; 54.7% were married couples living together; 11.3% had a female householder with no husband present and 30.2% were non-families. Of all households, 25.3% were made up of individuals and 10.8% had someone living alone who was 65 years of age or older. The average household size was 2.58 and the average family size was 3.13.

20.2% of the population were under the age of 18, 7.6% from 18 to 24, 27.3% from 25 to 44, 28.4% from 45 to 64, and 16.5% who were 65 years of age or older. The median age was 41.4 years. For every 100 females, the population had 91.4 males. For every 100 females ages 18 and older there were 88.2 males.

The Census Bureau's 2006–2010 American Community Survey showed that (in 2010 inflation-adjusted dollars) median household income was $79,279 (with a margin of error of +/− $6,351) and the median family income was $92,861 (+/− $9,495). Males had a median income of $60,214 (+/− $5,753) versus $44,243 (+/− $3,010) for females. The per capita income for the township was $33,674 (+/− $2,295). About none of families and 3.4% of the population were below the poverty line, including 5.6% of those under age 18 and 4.2% of those age 65 or over.

Same-sex couples headed 40 households in 2010, an increase from the 15 counted in 2000.

=== 2000 census ===
As of the 2000 United States census there were 13,155 people, 5,062 households, and 3,578 families residing in the township. The population density was 4,830.8 inhabitants per square mile (1,865.2/km^{2}). There were 5,161 housing units at an average density of 1,895.2 per square mile (731.7/km^{2}). The racial makeup of the township was 90.73% White, 1.39% Black, 0.04% Native American, 4.74% Asian, 1.70% from other races, and 1.41% from two or more races. Hispanic or Latino of any race were 6.27% of the population.

Among those resident who reported their ancestry in the 2000 census, the most common were Italian (35.7%), Irish (15.7%), Polish (13.1%) and German (11.0%). The number of residents who reported being of Italian ancestry in the 2000 census (adjusted for the total number of ancestries reported) was the 15th highest of any municipality in New Jersey.

There were 5,062 households, out of which 27.7% had children under the age of 18 living with them, 57.6% were married couples living together, 9.6% had a female householder with no husband present, and 29.3% were non-families. 25.0% of all households were made up of individuals, and 10.8% had someone living alone who was 65 years of age or older. The average household size was 2.58 and the average family size was 3.11.

In the township the population was spread out, with 20.2% under the age of 18, 6.7% from 18 to 24, 31.5% from 25 to 44, 23.6% from 45 to 64, and 18.0% who were 65 years of age or older. The median age was 40 years. For every 100 females, there were 89.4 males. For every 100 females age 18 and over, there were 87.1 males.

The median income for a household in the township was $63,545, and the median income for a family was $73,205. Males had a median income of $49,834 versus $34,542 for females. The per capita income for the township was $27,561. About 1.4% of families and 3.3% of the population were below the poverty line, including 2.8% of those under age 18 and 5.6% of those age 65 or over.

== Government ==
=== Local government ===
Saddle Brook operates within the Faulkner Act (formally known as the Optional Municipal Charter Law) under the Mayor-Council system of municipal government (Plan 2), implemented by direct petition as of January 1, 1991, after voters approved a referendum supporting the change in June 1990. The township is one of 71 (of the 564) municipalities statewide that use this form of government. The township's governing body is comprised of the Mayor and the five-member Township Council. Members of the Township Council are elected at-large in partisan elections to four-year terms of office on a staggered basis, with either two seats (plus the mayoral seat) or three seats up for election in even-numbered years as part of the November general election.

As of 2024, the Mayor of Saddle Brook is Democrat Robert D. White, whose term of office ends December 31, 2026. Members of the Township Council are Todd J. Accomando (D, 2026), Andrew M. Cimiluca (D, 2024), David Gierek (D, 2024), Florence Mazzer (D, 2024) and Sarah A. Sanchez (D, 2026).

In June 2017, David Gierek was chosen to fill the seat expiring in December 2020 that had been held by Joseph Camilleri until he resigned from office under the terms of an anti-nepotism ordinance, after his son was under consideration for hire by the township as a police officer; Gierek served on an interim basis until the November 2017 general election, when voters elected Gierek to serve the balance of the term of office.

==== List of mayors ====
Prior to 1969, the township committee chose a chairman to head the township committee. Below is a list of former chairmen and mayors of Saddle River Township and Saddle Brook:

- James Taylor: 1925–1926
- William Schlitze: 1927, 1929
- John J. Miller: 1928
- William Schlitze: 1929
- William E. Schlitze: 1929–1930
- John Finley: 1931
- Edward Woollby: 1932–1933
- Adolph Doornbosch: 1934
- Edward Woollby: 1935–1936
- Joseph Wilhelm: 1937–1939
- Otto E. Pehle: 1940, 1942
- Otto C. Pehle: 1943–1947
- Joseph A Evans: 1948
- Otto C. Pehle: December 1948 – 1953
- Walter J. Ochsner: 1953–1956
- Frank Sheara: 1957–1958
- Otto C. Pehle: 1959
- Edwin Zdanowicz: 1960
- Benjamin Walenczyk: 1962–1964
- Jeremiah F. O'Connor: 1965
- Edward Siepiola: 1966
- Stephen J. Cuccio: 1967
- Benjamin Walenczyk: 1968
- Thomas Zangara: 1969
- Edward F. Kugler, Jr: 1969–1977 (First elected mayor)
- Charles J. Kern: 1977–1981
- Raymond C. Santa Lucia: 1981–1985
- Peter A. LoDico: 1985–1989
- Thomas Trier: 1989–1990
- Raymond C. Santa Lucia: 1991–August 1997 (died in office)
- Bernard Goldsholl: August–September 1997
- Karen Chamberlain: 1997–2002
- Louis D'Arminio: 2003–2010
- Karen Chamberlain: 2011–2015
- Robert D. White: 2015–present

=== Federal, state and county representation ===
Saddle Brook is located in the 9th Congressional District and is part of New Jersey's 38th state legislative district.

For the 119th United States Congress, New Jersey's 9th congressional district is represented by Nellie Pou (D, North Haledon) New Jersey is represented in the United States Senate by Democrats Cory Booker (Newark, term ends 2027) and Andy Kim (Moorestown, term ends 2031).

For the 2026–2027 session, the 38th legislative district of the New Jersey Legislature is represented in the State Senate by Joseph Lagana (D, Paramus) and in the General Assembly by Lisa Swain (D, Fair Lawn) and Chris Tully (D, Bergenfield).

Bergen County is governed by a directly elected County Executive, with legislative functions performed by a Board of County Commissioners comprised of seven members who are elected at-large to three-year terms in partisan elections on a staggered basis, with either two or three seats coming up for election each November; a Chairman and Vice Chairman are selected from among its seven members at a reorganization meeting held every January. As of 2025, the county executive is James J. Tedesco III (D, Paramus), whose four-year term of office ends December 31, 2026.

Bergen County's Commissioners are Chair Mary J. Amoroso (D, Mahwah, 2025), Vice Chair Steven A. Tanelli (D, North Arlington, 2027), Chair Pro Tem Joan Voss (D, Fort Lee, 2026), Rafael Marte (D, Bergenfield, 2026), Germaine M. Ortiz (D, Emerson, 2025), Thomas J. Sullivan Jr. (D, Montvale, 2025) and Tracy Silna Zur (D, Franklin Lakes, 2027).

Bergen County's elected constitutional officials are Clerk John S. Hogan (D, Northvale, 2026), Sheriff Anthony Cureton (D, Englewood, 2027) and Surrogate Michael R. Dressler (D, Cresskill, 2026).

=== Politics ===
United States presidential election results for Saddle Brook 2024 2020 2016 2012 2008 2004
Year	Republican		Democratic		Third party(ies)	
Year	No.	%	No.	%	No.	%
2024	4,341	57.46%	3,039	40.23%	175	2.32%
2020	4,015	51.32%	3,712	47.44%	97	1.24%
2016	3,644	53.47%	2,992	43.90%	179	2.63%
2012	2,945	46.86%	3,264	51.93%	76	1.21%
2008	3,495	52.06%	3,159	47.05%	60	0.89%
2004	3,467	52.97%	3,025	46.22%	53	0.81%

As of March 2011, there were a total of 8,377 registered voters in Saddle Brook Township, of which 2,890 (34.5% vs. 31.7% countywide) were registered as Democrats, 1,603 (19.1% vs. 21.1%) were registered as Republicans and 3,882 (46.3% vs. 47.1%) were registered as Unaffiliated. There were 2 voters registered as Libertarians or Greens. Among the township's 2010 Census population, 61.3% (vs. 57.1% in Bergen County) were registered to vote, including 76.8% of those ages 18 and over (vs. 73.7% countywide).

In the 2016 presidential election, Republican Donald Trump received 3,644 votes (53.2% vs. 41.1% countywide), ahead of Democrat Hillary Clinton with 2,992 votes (43.7% vs. 54.2%) and other candidates with 213 votes (3.1% vs. 4.6%), among the 6,926 ballots cast by the township's 9,360 registered voters, for a turnout of 74.0% (vs. 72.5% in Bergen County). In the 2012 presidential election, Democrat Barack Obama received 3,264 votes (51.5% vs. 54.8% countywide), ahead of Republican Mitt Romney with 2,945 votes (46.5% vs. 43.5%) and other candidates with 76 votes (1.2% vs. 0.9%), among the 6,334 ballots cast by the township's 8,789 registered voters, for a turnout of 72.1% (vs. 70.4% in Bergen County). In the 2008 presidential election, Republican John McCain received 3,495 votes (51.5% vs. 44.5% countywide), ahead of Democrat Barack Obama with 3,159 votes (46.6% vs. 53.9%) and other candidates with 60 votes (0.9% vs. 0.8%), among the 6,785 ballots cast by the township's 8,628 registered voters, for a turnout of 78.6% (vs. 76.8% in Bergen County). In the 2004 presidential election, Republican George W. Bush received 3,467 votes (52.7% vs. 47.2% countywide), ahead of Democrat John Kerry with 3,025 votes (46.0% vs. 51.7%) and other candidates with 53 votes (0.8% vs. 0.7%), among the 6,576 ballots cast by the township's 8,369 registered voters, for a turnout of 78.6% (vs. 76.9% in the whole county).

Gubernatorial election results for Saddle Brook
Year	Republican		Democratic		Third party(ies)	
Year	No.	%	No.	%	No.	%
2025	2,927	51.93%	2,689	47.71%	20	0.35%
2021	2,661	56.85%	1,986	42.43%	34	0.73%
2017	1,748	48.68%	1,778	49.51%	65	1.81%
2013	2,489	63.35%	1,404	35.73%	36	0.92%
2009	2,025	50.27%	1,775	44.07%	228	5.66%
2005	1,774	44.46%	2,110	52.88%	106	2.66%

In the 2013 gubernatorial election, Republican Chris Christie received 63.3% of the vote (2,489 cast), ahead of Democrat Barbara Buono with 35.7% (1,404 votes), and other candidates with 0.9% (36 votes), among the 4,040 ballots cast by the township's 8,459 registered voters (111 ballots were spoiled), for a turnout of 47.8%. In the 2009 gubernatorial election, Republican Chris Christie received 2,025 votes (50.0% vs. 45.8% countywide), ahead of Democrat Jon Corzine with 1,775 votes (43.8% vs. 48.0%), Independent Chris Daggett with 212 votes (5.2% vs. 4.7%) and other candidates with 16 votes (0.4% vs. 0.5%), among the 4,049 ballots cast by the township's 8,478 registered voters, yielding a 47.8% turnout (vs. 50.0% in the county).

United States Senate election results for Saddle Brook1
Year	Republican		Democratic		Third party(ies)	
Year	No.	%	No.	%	No.	%
2024	3,661	53.50%	2,963	43.30%	219	3.20%
2018	2,478	50.64%	2,245	45.88%	170	3.47%
2012	2,343	42.95%	3,016	55.29%	96	1.76%
2006	2,214	50.39%	2,122	48.29%	58	1.32%

United States Senate election results for Saddle Brook2
Year	Republican		Democratic		Third party(ies)	
Year	No.	%	No.	%	No.	%
2020	3,599	47.85%	3,775	50.19%	147	1.95%
2014	1,598	41.01%	2,228	57.17%	71	1.82%
2013	1,058	50.60%	1,008	48.21%	25	1.20%
2008	2,078	39.70%	3,086	58.96%	70	1.34%

== Education ==
The Saddle Brook Public Schools serves students in pre-kindergarten through twelfth grade. As of the 2023–24 school year, the district, comprised of five schools, had an enrollment of 1,848 students and 149.7 classroom teachers (on an FTE basis), for a student–teacher ratio of 12.3:1. Schools in the district (with 2023–24 enrollment data from the National Center for Education Statistics) are Washington School which houses the district's early intervention special education programs, with 52 students in PreK, Franklin Elementary School with 312 students in grades K–6, Salome H. Long Memorial Elementary School with 309 students in grades K–6, Helen I. Smith Elementary School with 342 students in grades K–6 and Saddle Brook High School / Middle School with 804 students in grades 7–12.

Public school students from the township, and all of Bergen County, are eligible to attend the secondary education programs offered by the Bergen County Technical Schools, which include the Bergen County Academies in Hackensack, and the Bergen Tech campus in Teterboro or Paramus. The district offers programs on a shared-time or full-time basis, with admission based on a selective application process and tuition covered by the student's home school district.

== Transportation ==
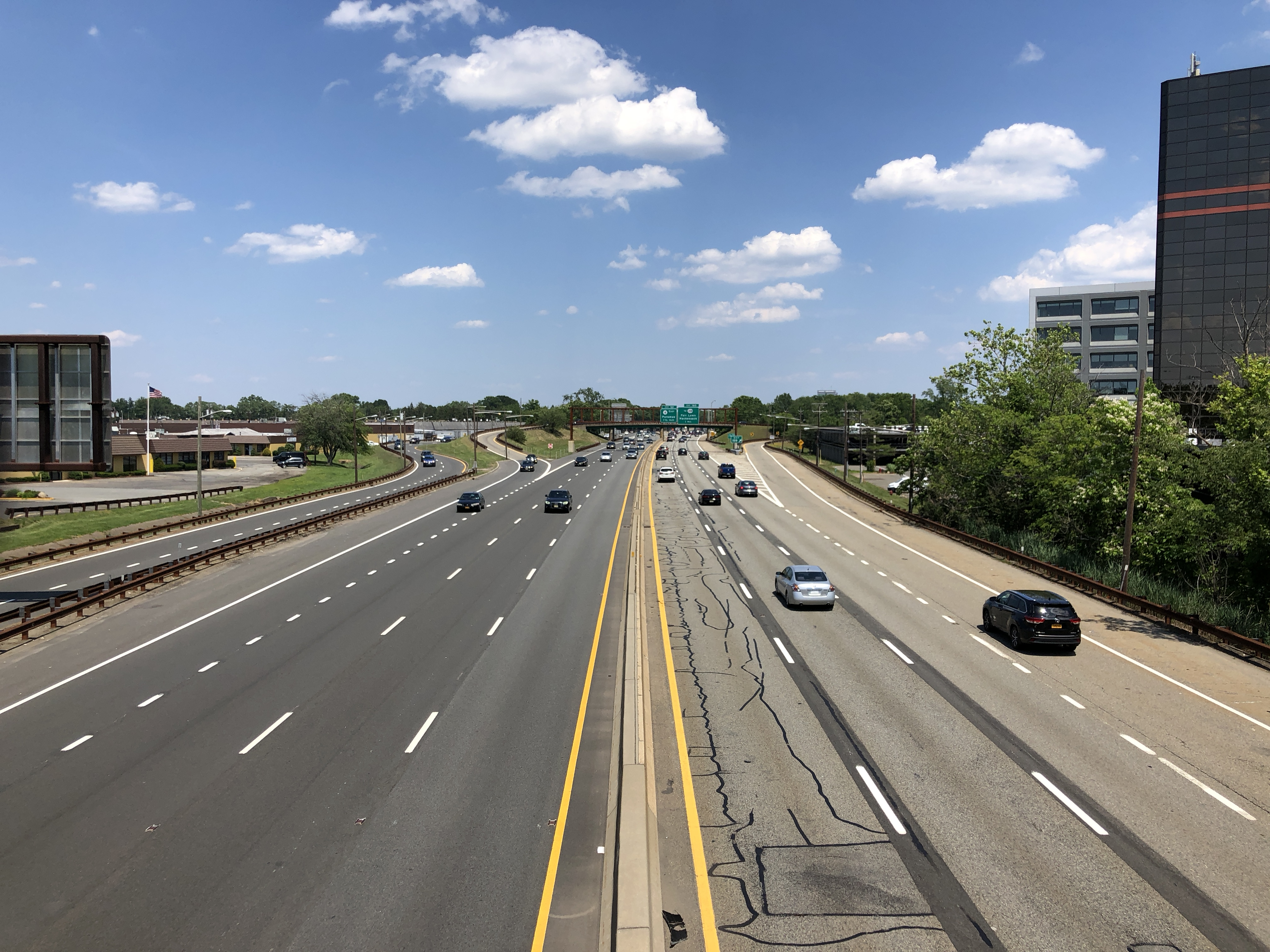
View north along the Garden State Parkway in Saddle Brook

=== Roads and highways ===
As of May 2010, the township had a total of 41.73 miles (67.16 km) of roadways, of which 31.45 miles (50.61 km) were maintained by the municipality, 6.91 miles (11.12 km) by Bergen County, 2.40 miles (3.86 km) by the New Jersey Department of Transportation, and 0.97 miles (1.56 km) by the New Jersey Turnpike Authority.

Saddle Brook hosts the intersection of the Garden State Parkway (Exit 159) and Interstate 80 (Exit 62), along with portions of U.S. Route 46. Route 4 and Route 17 are within a quarter mile of its borders.

The Parkway extends across the center of the township for 1.0 mile (1.6 km), heading northeast from Elmwood Park to Rochelle Park. Two toll gates are located in the township, with one toll gate on the northbound lanes of the parkway (just north of Exit 159), and the other toll gate used at the interchange for Exit 159.

Interstate 80 heads east through Saddle Brook for 1.6 miles (2.6 km) from Elmwood Park to Lodi. U.S. Route 46 clips the township's southwest corner, heading southeast for 0.6 miles (0.97 km) from Garfield to Lodi on Saddle Brook's southern border.

=== Public transportation ===
NJ Transit's Plauderville rail station is near the township's southwest corner, just across the border in Garfield, south of the intersection of Plauderville Avenue and Midland Avenue. The station provides service on the Bergen County Line to Hoboken Terminal, with transfers available at Secaucus Junction to New York Penn Station, Newark Penn Station, and Newark Airport, and with transfers at Hoboken to PATH trains, Hudson Bergen Light Rail, and New York Waterway ferries.

NJ Transit bus service is offered to the Port Authority Bus Terminal in Midtown Manhattan on the 144, 145, 148, 160, 161 and 164 routes; and to other New Jersey communities served on the 707, 712 and 758 routes.

== Television station ==
From 1999 to January 2009, Saddle Brook had a public-access cable TV station with news bulletins (channel 77 on Cablevision and channels 38 and 39 on Verizon FiOS). This station, called SBC-TV, was created after Hurricane Floyd hit Saddle Brook in September 1999 so the town would have a system for emergency alerts. The station was shut down in 2009 because of budget constraints. The station resumed operations in 2011 with an all-volunteer staff, airing Township Council meetings and providing information of Township services, events and activities via a scrolling message board.

== Points of interest ==
Riverside Cemetery is a plot-holder-owned Jewish cemetery with over 65,000 burials. Acquired by the Lakewood Cemetery Association in 1906, the 105-acre (42 ha) property includes an Italianate style home used as administrative offices that has been restored and expanded after the building was extensively damaged in a 1950 fire.

Passaic Junction is a rail yard owned by New York, Susquehanna and Western Railway that has a connection to and is the official interchange location with Norfolk Southern.

The Kessler Institute for Rehabilitation maintains a campus in Saddle Brook, in addition to other main campuses in Chester and West Orange. The Saddle Brook campus was established after the acquisition of Saddle Brook/Kennedy Memorial Hospital in 1993, and operates 112 beds, specializing in rehabilitation from stroke, brain injury, amputation, neurological conditions (including Multiple Sclerosis, ALS and Parkinson's disease), joint replacement and orthopedic trauma

The First Reformed Church of Saddle Brook, located at 5 Ackerman Avenue, was the first church to be established in the present boundaries of the township. It was officially established in 1900, with its first worship service being held on May 5, 1901.

== Notable people ==
People who were born in, residents of, or otherwise closely associated with Saddle Brook include:

- Steve Beauharnais (born 1990), defensive linebacker for the Washington Redskins
- Gary Brolsma (born 1986), Internet sensation and creator of the original Numa Numa Dance
- Joe Cunningham (1931–2021), former MLB first baseman and outfielder first baseman and outfielder who played for the St. Louis Cardinals, Chicago White Sox and Washington Senators
- A. Lee Dellon (born 1944), plastic surgeon known for his work in treating peripheral nerve injury
- Ralph Giacomarro (born 1961), former American football punter who played in the NFL for the Atlanta Falcons and Denver Broncos
- Morgan Hoffmann (born 1989), professional golfer
- Kim Jones (born 1969), broadcaster for the New York Yankees on the YES Network
- Zane Kalemba (born 1985), professional ice hockey goaltender who has played for HC Banská Bystrica in the Slovak Extraliga
- Steve Longa (born 1994), linebacker for the Detroit Lions of the NFL
- Steve Maneri (born 1988), tight end for the Chicago Bears
- Fred Mariani, former head football coach for the Iona Gaels football team
- Jeremiah F. O'Connor (1933–2020), politician who represented the 13th Legislative District in the New Jersey Senate from 1966 to 1968
- David Schuman, founder and president of Schuman Enterprises, who runs the National Underclassmen Combine, the nation's largest high school football combine and recruitment showcase

== Sources ==
- History of Bergen County, New Jersey, 1630–1923 by Westervelt, Frances A. (Frances Augusta), 1858–1942.
- Municipal Incorporations of the State of New Jersey (according to Counties) prepared by the Division of Local Government, Department of the Treasury (New Jersey); December 1, 1958.
- Clayton, W. Woodford; and Nelson, William. History of Bergen and Passaic Counties, New Jersey, with Biographical Sketches of Many of its Pioneers and Prominent Men., Philadelphia: Everts and Peck, 1882.
- Harvey, Cornelius Burnham (ed.), Genealogical History of Hudson and Bergen Counties, New Jersey. New York: New Jersey Genealogical Publishing Co., 1900.
- Van Valen, James M. History of Bergen County, New Jersey. New York: New Jersey Publishing and Engraving Co., 1900.
- Westervelt, Frances A. (Frances Augusta), 1858–1942, History of Bergen County, New Jersey, 1630–1923, Lewis Historical Publishing Company, 1923.
- Women's Club of Saddle Brook. A History of Saddle Brook, The Department, 1961.
