= Dellon =

Dellon is both a given name and a surname. Notable people with the name include:

- Dellon Peiris (born 2000), Sri Lankan cricketer
- A. Lee Dellon (born 1944), American plastic surgeon
- Allan Dellon (norm 1997), Brazilian footballer
- Charles Dellon (1649–c. 1710), French physician
