= Saddle Brook High School =

Public secondary school in Bergen County, New Jersey, United States

Location
- 355 Mayhill Street; Saddle Brook, Bergen County, New Jersey 07663; United States; 40.905323°N 74.089793°W

Information
- Type: Public high school
- Established: 1958
- School district: Saddle Brook Public Schools
- NCES School ID: 341449000824
- Principal: Donald J. Meisch Jr.
- Faculty: 62.9 FTEs
- Grades: 7–12
- Enrollment: 806 (as of 2024–25)
- Student to teacher ratio: 12.8:1
- Colors: Blue white and gold
- Athletics conference: North Jersey Interscholastic Conference
- Team name: Falcons
- Website: highschool.sbpsnj.org

Saddle Brook High School is a six-year comprehensive community public high school that serves students in seventh through twelfth grades from Saddle Brook, in Bergen County, in the U.S. state of New Jersey, operating as the lone secondary school of the Saddle Brook Public Schools.

As of the 2024–25 school year, the school had an enrollment of 806 students and 62.9 classroom teachers (on an FTE basis), for a student–teacher ratio of 12.8:1. There were 214 students (26.6% of enrollment) eligible for free lunch and 35 (4.3% of students) eligible for reduced-cost lunch.

== History ==
in December 1955, voters approved by a better than 6-1 margin a referendum allocating $1.15 million (equivalent to $13.8 million in 2025) for the construction of a high school on a 13-acre (5.3 ha) site that had been contributed by the township; voters had rejected an earlier proposal that would have spent $1.8 million for a junior-senior high school project.

Students in ninth through twelfth grades had attended Lodi High School until the new Saddle Brook High School opened in September 1958. At its opening, the building served 650 students in grades 7-10, with those in eleventh and twelfth grades continuing in Lodi until their graduation.

With the opening of the Long Memorial Elementary School in Spring 1960, 7th and 8th grade students from Cambridge School no longer used space in the high school building. The high school was expanded in the mid 1960s and by the 1970s there were approximately 1,200 students in grades 9 through 12. Due to changes in demographics, the school became a High School/Middle School in the early 1990s serving grades 7 through 12. At that time Washington Elementary School was closed and reused for other purposes and the other three elementary schools in Saddle Brook—Franklin, Helen I. Smith and Long Memorial—changed from a K-8 format to K-6.

== Awards, recognition and rankings ==
The school was the 205th-ranked public high school in New Jersey out of 339 schools statewide in New Jersey Monthly magazine's September 2014 cover story on the state's "Top Public High Schools", using a new ranking methodology. The school had been ranked 153rd in the state of 328 schools in 2012, after being ranked 170th in 2010 out of 322 schools listed. The magazine ranked the school 142nd in 2008 out of 316 schools. The school was ranked 191st in the magazine's September 2006 issue, which surveyed 316 schools across the state.

== Athletics ==
The Saddle Brook High School Falcons participate in the North Jersey Interscholastic Conference, which is comprised of small-enrollment schools in Bergen, Hudson, Morris and Passaic counties, and was created following a reorganization of sports leagues in Northern New Jersey by the New Jersey State Interscholastic Athletic Association (NJSIAA). Prior to realignment that took effect in the fall of 2010, Saddle Brook was a member of the smaller Bergen-Passaic Scholastic League (BPSL). With 397 students in grades 10-12, the school was classified by the NJSIAA for the 2019–20 school year as Group I for most athletic competition purposes, which included schools with an enrollment of 75 to 476 students in that grade range. The school was classified by the NJSIAA as Group I North for football for 2024–2026, which included schools with 254 to 474 students.

Interscholastic sports teams offered at Saddle Brook include football, boys soccer, girls soccer, cross country boys and girls, boys basketball, girls basketball, wrestling, winter track boys and girls, spring track boys and girls, baseball, softball and girls tennis.

The boys' track team won the Group I / II indoor relay title in 1973 (as co-champion with Metuchen High School), won the Group II title in 1976, and won the Group I title in 1987 and 1991; the girls' track team won the Group I championship in 1983 and 1992.

The boys team has won winter / indoor track titles in Group II in both 1975 and 1976, and in Group I in 1991, 2004 (as co-champion) and 2005.

The girls' cross country team won the Group II state championship in 1976 and 1978.

The boys' wrestling team won the North I Group II state sectional championship in 1981.

The softball team won the North I, Group I state sectional championships in 1998 and 2000, 2002, 2005, 2009 and won again in 2013 with a 5-0 victory over New Milford High School in the tournament finals. The softball team has had 18 consecutive 20-game win seasons. The team won the BPSL Carpenter Division title in 1999, 2001, 2002, 2004, 2006, 2007 and 2009 and in 2008 made it to the final in the county tournament as the only group I school left in the tournament.

The boys track team won the Group I spring / outdoor track state championship in 2005. Saddle Brook's track and field team, led by Coach Howard Schuman, won the 2005 indoor and outdoor Group I NJSIAA state track championships.

== Administration ==
The school's principal is Donald J. Meisch Jr. His administration team includes the vice principal.

== Notable alumni ==
- Steve Beauharnais (born 1990), defensive linebacker for the New England Patriots who transferred out of the high school before his senior year.
- Jim Capobianco (born 1969), film director, animator and screenwriter
- A. Lee Dellon (born 1944), plastic surgeon known for his work in treating peripheral nerve injury.
- Mohammed Dewji (born 1975, class of 1994), Tanzanian businessman and former politician.
- Ralph Giacomarro (born 1961), former American football punter who played in the NFL for the Atlanta Falcons and Denver Broncos.
- Steve Longa (born 1994), linebacker for the Detroit Lions of the NFL.
- Steve Maneri (born 1988), tight end who played in the NFL for the Chicago Bears.
- Anna Memija (born 2004) footballer who plays as a forward for the Albania national team.
- David Schuman, football coach and analyst who runs the National Underclassmen Combine.

== Notable faculty ==
- Jane Moffet (1930–2018), utility player who played for four seasons in the All-American Girls Professional Baseball League and served 23 years as the school's principal.
