= Ralph Giacomarro =

American football player (born 1961)

No. 1, 6
- Position: Punter

Personal information
- Born: January 17, 1961 (age 65); Passaic, New Jersey, U.S.
- Listed height: 6 ft 1 in (1.85 m)
- Listed weight: 190 lb (86 kg)

Career information
- High school: Saddle Brook (Saddle Brook, New Jersey)
- College: Penn State
- NFL draft: 1983: 10th round, 268th overall pick

Career history
- Atlanta Falcons (1983–1985); Denver Broncos (1987); Los Angeles Raiders (1988)*
- * Offseason or practice squad member only

Awards and highlights
- National champion (1982); 2× First-team All-East (1981, 1982)

Career NFL statistics
- Punts: 185
- Punt yards: 7,592
- Longest punt: 58
- Stats at Pro Football Reference

Ralph Giacomarro (born January 17, 1961) is an American former professional football player who was a punter for four seasons in the National Football League (NFL). He played college football for the Penn State Nittany Lions.

Born in Passaic, New Jersey and raised in Saddle Brook, New Jersey, Giacomarro attended Saddle Brook High/Middle School.
