= Steve Maneri =

American football player (born 1988)

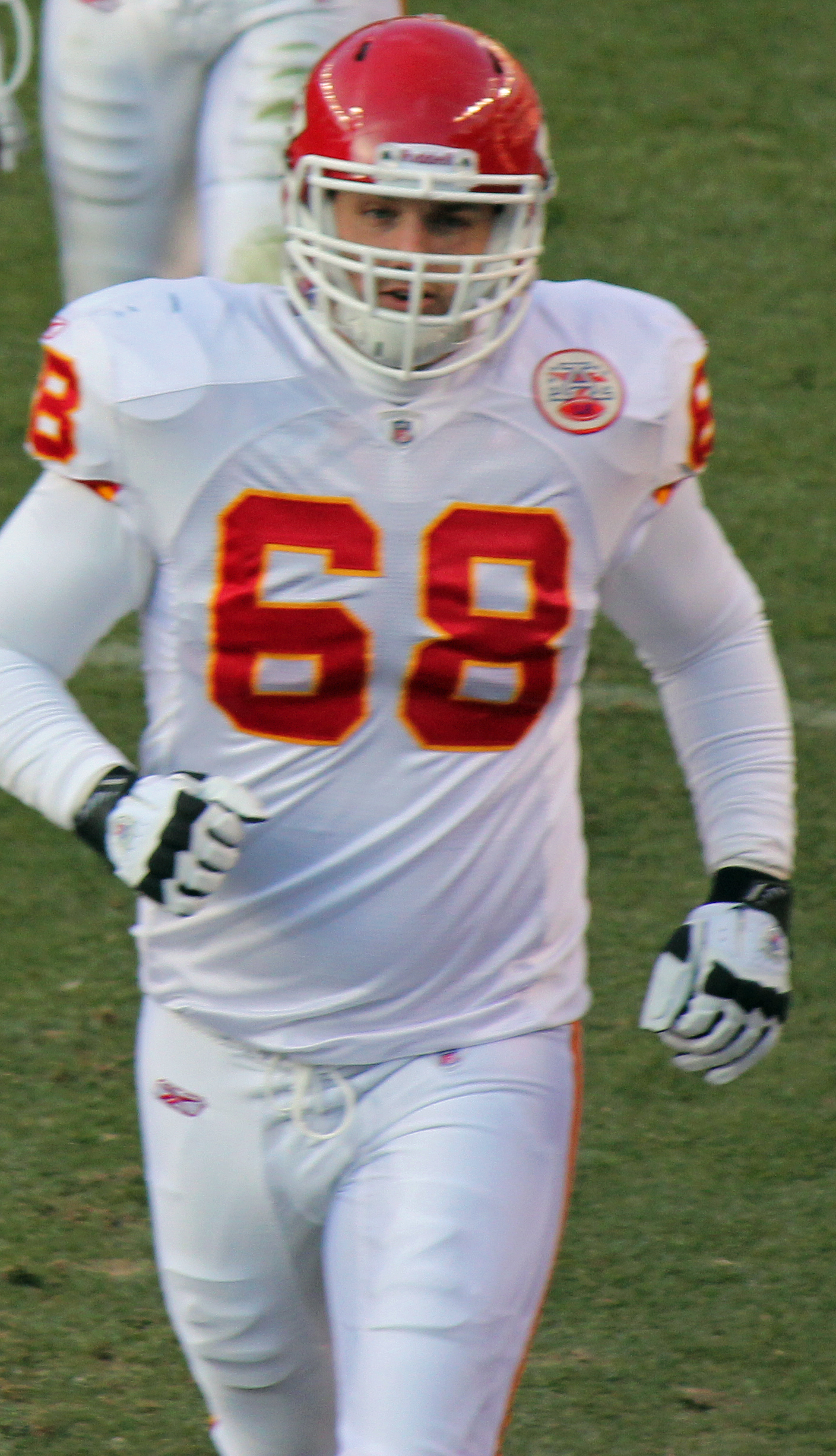
- Maneri during the 2011 NFL season

No. 68, 87, 86
- Position: Tight end

Personal information
- Born: March 20, 1988 (age 38); Saddle Brook, New Jersey, U.S.
- Listed height: 6 ft 6 in (1.98 m)
- Listed weight: 275 lb (125 kg)

Career information
- High school: Saddle Brook
- College: Temple (2006–2009)
- NFL draft: 2010: undrafted

Career history
- Houston Texans (2010)*; New England Patriots (2010); Kansas City Chiefs (2011–2012); Chicago Bears (2013); Tampa Bay Buccaneers (2014)*; New England Patriots (2014); New York Jets (2015)*
- * Offseason or practice squad member only

Awards and highlights
- Third-team All-MAC (2009)

Career NFL statistics
- Receptions: 6
- Receiving yards: 52
- Receiving average: 8.7
- Stats at Pro Football Reference

Steve Maneri (born March 20, 1988) is an American former professional football player who was a tight end in the National Football League (NFL). He played college football for the Temple Owls and was signed as an undrafted free agent by the Houston Texans in 2010.

He has played for the Kansas City Chiefs, Chicago Bears, Tampa Bay Buccaneers, New England Patriots, and New York Jets.

== Early life ==
Maneri attended Saddle Brook High School in Saddle Brook, New Jersey, graduating in 2006. He played varsity basketball for three years, earning all-county honors as well as being named to the Bergen-Passaic Scholastic League Carpenter Division first-team in his junior and senior seasons. Maneri played one season of football as a tight end, making 36 catches for 607 yards and five touchdowns as a senior, earning Bergen Record second-team All-North Jersey honors. He was coached in football at Saddle Brook by NationalUnderclassmen.com and National Underclassmen Combine founder David Schuman.

== College career ==
Following high school, Maneri attended Temple University, playing in ten games at tight end as a true freshman in 2006. He had six catches on the season for 61 yards and two touchdowns. He played in 13 games in 2007, starting three. In 2008, as a junior, Maneri started 9 of 12 games, recording 14 receptions for 150 yards and four touchdowns. In his senior season in 2009, Maneri started all 13 games at tight end, finishing the season with 12 receptions for 134 yards and two touchdowns, earning third-team All-Mid-American Conference honors.

== Professional career ==
=== Houston Texans ===
After going undrafted in the 2010 NFL draft, Maneri signed with the Houston Texans as an offensive tackle. He was waived by the team during final cuts on September 4, 2010.

=== New England Patriots (first stint) ===
Maneri was claimed off waivers by the New England Patriots on September 5, 2010. He was waived on September 27, 2010, after being inactive for the first three games of the season. He was then re-signed to the team's practice squad on September 29. He was re-signed to a future contract for the 2011 season on January 20, 2011. He was waived on September 4.

=== Kansas City Chiefs ===
On September 5, he was claimed off waivers by the Kansas City Chiefs. During the 2012 offseason, his position was changed to Tight End.

=== Chicago Bears ===
On March 21, 2013, Maneri signed a two-year deal with the Chicago Bears. On October 21, the Bears released Maneri to make room for Jordan Palmer after Jay Cutler's injury.

=== Tampa Bay Buccaneers ===
Maneri signed with the Tampa Bay Buccaneers on February 14, 2014. He was released by the Buccaneers on May 12, 2014.

=== New England Patriots (second stint) ===
Maneri re-signed with the New England Patriots on August 10, 2014. He was released on August 30 during final cuts.

On December 17, 2014, the Patriots announced that they re-signed Maneri to the 53-man roster. On January 17, 2015, the Patriots waived him.

=== New York Jets ===
Maneri was signed by the New York Jets on June 15, 2015 after Zach Sudfeld suffered an anterior cruciate ligament injury in minicamp.
