= A. Lee Dellon =

American plastic surgeon (born 1944)

- Born: Arnold Lee Dellon; April 18, 1944 (age 82); Bronx, New York
- Citizenship: United States
- Education: Johns Hopkins University (BA) Johns Hopkins University School of Medicine (MD) Utrecht University, Netherlands (PhD)
- Years active: 38
- Known for: Peripheral Nerve Surgery
- Medical career
- Profession: Surgery of the peripheral nerve
- Research: Peripheral nerve injury, regeneration, and reconstruction. Pelvic pain, facial pain
- Website: www.dellon.com

Arnold Lee Dellon (born April 18, 1944) is an American plastic surgeon known for his work in the field of peripheral nerve injury. He is a Professor of Plastic Surgery and Neurosurgery at Johns Hopkins University and the founder of Dellon Institutes for Peripheral Nerve Surgery.

== Early life and education ==
Dellon was born in the Bronx, New York to parents Irene Jewel Dellon and Alfred Dellon. He grew up in Saddle Brook, New Jersey and graduated from Saddle Brook High School. He went on to study pre-med at Johns Hopkins University in Baltimore and graduated with a BA in 1966. He then proceeded to Johns Hopkins University School of Medicine where he earned his MD in 1970.

Dellon then spent two years as a Clinical Associate and Lieutenant commander in the United States Public Health Service in the Surgery Branch of the National Cancer Institute. He became the first Hand Surgery Fellow at the Curtis National Hand Center in Baltimore in 1977 and completed Plastic Surgery Residency at the Johns Hopkins Hospital in 1978. He received a PhD from Utrecht University in the Netherlands in 2007 for his work relieving pain, preventing ulcers and amputations in diabetics with neuropathy and chronic nerve compression.

== Career ==
Dellon founded the Dellon Institutes for Peripheral Nerve Surgery in 2000 and began the first Peripheral Nerve Fellowship training program in 2002. He serves as Professor of Plastic Surgery and Neurosurgery at Johns Hopkins University School of Medicine. He remains the only person to be promoted at the Johns Hopkins University to Full Professor of Plastic Surgery and Neurosurgery while in private practice.

Dellon is the author of five books, as well as over 450 scientific papers. He held editorial positions for many years on various journals in the field of plastic surgery including Annals of Plastic Surgery, Journal of Hand Therapy, Journal of Hand Surgery, (American Volume) and Journal of Reconstructive Microsurgery.

Dellon is one of the founding members of the American Society for Peripheral Nerve (ASPN) in 1991 and is its second President as of 2016. He is also the founding member of the Association of Extremity Nerve Surgeons in 2005, and received its Lifetime Achievement Award in 2013.

== Awards and recognition ==
- 1977 – Cleft Palate Associate Educational Award.
- 1985 – Robert H. Ivy Award of Pennsylvania Society of Plastic Surgeons.
- 1985– Emanuel Kaplan Award of the New York State Society for Surgery of the Hand.
- 2005 – USA Plastic Surgeon of the Year.
- 2012 – Emanuel Kaplan Award of the New York State Society for Surgery of the Hand (second win).
- 2013 – Lifetime Achievement Award by Association of Extremity Nerve Surgeons.

== See also ==
- Peripheral nerve injury
- Plastic surgery
- Neurosurgery
