= Saddle Brook Public Schools =

School district in Bergen County, New Jersey, US

Address
- 355 Mayhill Street Saddle Brook, Bergen County, New Jersey, 07663; United States
- Coordinates: 40.905323°N 74.089793°W

District information
- Grades: PreK-12
- Superintendent: Toni Violetti
- Business administrator: Raymond Karaty
- Schools: 5

Students and staff
- Enrollment: 1,848 (as of 2023–24)
- Faculty: 149.7 FTEs
- Student–teacher ratio: 12.3:1

Other information
- District Factor Group: DE
- Website: www.sbpsnj.org
| Ind. | Per pupil | District spending | Rank (*) | K-12 average | %± vs. average |
|---|---|---|---|---|---|
| 1A | Total Spending | $23,708 | 45 | $18,891 | 25.5% |
| 1 | Budgetary Cost | 13,967 | 27 | 14,783 | −5.5% |
| 2 | Classroom Instruction | 7,881 | 22 | 8,763 | −10.1% |
| 6 | Support Services | 2,500 | 37 | 2,392 | 4.5% |
| 8 | Administrative Cost | 1,562 | 20 | 1,485 | 5.2% |
| 10 | Operations & Maintenance | 1,659 | 32 | 1,783 | −7.0% |
| 13 | Extracurricular Activities | 340 | 9 | 268 | 26.9% |
| 16 | Median Teacher Salary | 58,475 | 22 | 64,043 |
Data from NJDoE 2014 Taxpayers' Guide to Education Spending. *Of K-12 districts with up to 1,800 students. Lowest spending=1; Highest=49

The Saddle Brook Public Schools are a comprehensive community public school district that serves students in pre-kindergarten through twelfth grade from Saddle Brook, in Bergen County, in the U.S. state of New Jersey.

As of the 2023–24 school year, the district, comprised of five schools, had an enrollment of 1,848 students and 149.7 classroom teachers (on an FTE basis), for a student–teacher ratio of 12.3:1.

The district's schools are accredited by the New Jersey Department of Education.

== History ==
in December 1955, voters approved by a better than 6-1 margin a referendum allocating $1.15 million (equivalent to $13.5 million in 2024) for the construction of a high school on a 13-acre (5.3 ha) site that had been contributed by the township; voters had rejected an earlier proposal that would have spent $1.8 million for a junior-senior high school project. The high school opened in September 1958 with 650 students in grades 7–10, with those in eleventh and twelfth grades continuing in Lodi High School, the previous sending school, until their graduation.

The district underwent a $24.4 million expansion and renovation campaign to update facilities and providing new instructional space for its growing enrollment. Renovations at the three elementary schools were completed toward the conclusion of the 2004-05 school year with full occupancy at the opening of the 2005-06 school year in September. At the middle/high school, two large additions went up during the school year. One area houses a state-of-the-art library/media center and six new classrooms, while the other area houses a new gymnasium/fitness center. Renovations that began in the summer of 2005 brought updated science labs to the middle/high school. The project included $18.5 million included in a March 2002 referendum plus an additional $5.9 million that was added in a second vote in June 2004 after the district concluded that costs for the project would be higher than had been originally expected.

In December 2022, voters rejected three referendum proposals totaling $58.6 million that would have included the creation of a new middle school, two new turf fields and updates at other district schools. Voters approved a stripped-down referendum in March 2023 for 14.4 million that would cover many of the projects proposed earlier and would be covered by $5 million in funding from the state of New jersey.

The district had been classified by the New Jersey Department of Education as being in District Factor Group "DE", the fifth-highest of eight groupings. District Factor Groups organize districts statewide to allow comparison by common socioeconomic characteristics of the local districts. From lowest socioeconomic status to highest, the categories are A, B, CD, DE, FG, GH, I and J.

== Schools ==
Schools in the district (with 2023–24 enrollment data from the National Center for Education Statistics) are:

Preschool / special education

- Washington School which houses the district's early intervention special education programs, with 52 students in PreK
  - Brooke Hanenberg, principal

Elementary schools

- Franklin Elementary School with 312 students in grades K–6
  - James Robinson, principal
- Salome H. Long Memorial Elementary School with 309 students in grades K–6
  - Jacquelyn Mansfield, principal
- Helen I. Smith Elementary School with 342 students in grades K–6
  - Deborah Wunder, principal

High school

- Saddle Brook High School / Middle School with 804 students in grades 7–12
  - Brenda Coffey, middle school principal
  - Donald J. Meisch, high schol principal

== Administration ==
Core members of the district's administration are:

- Toni Violetti, superintendent
- Raymond Karaty, business administrator and board secretary

== Board of education ==
The district's board of education, comprised of nine members, sets policy and oversees the fiscal and educational operation of the district through its administration. As a Type II school district, the board's trustees are elected directly by voters to serve three-year terms of office on a staggered basis, with three seats up for election each year held (since 2012) as part of the November general election. The board appoints a superintendent to oversee the district's day-to-day operations and a business administrator to supervise the business functions of the district.
