= Steve Beauharnais =

American football player (born 1990)

No. 58
- Position: Linebacker

Personal information
- Born: May 2, 1990 (age 36); Saddle Brook, New Jersey, U.S.
- Listed height: 6 ft 1 in (1.85 m)
- Listed weight: 240 lb (109 kg)

Career information
- High school: Saint Joseph Regional (Montvale, New Jersey)
- College: Rutgers
- NFL draft: 2013: 7th round, 235th overall pick

Career history
- New England Patriots (2013); Washington Redskins (2014); San Francisco 49ers (2015)*; Arizona Hotshots (2019); St. Louis BattleHawks (2020)
- * Offseason or practice squad member only
- Stats at Pro Football Reference

Steve Beauharnais (born May 2, 1990) is an American former professional football player who was a linebacker in the National Football League (NFL). He played college football for the Rutgers Scarlet Knights and was selected by the New England Patriots in the seventh round of the 2013 NFL draft. He was also a member of the Washington Redskins, San Francisco 49ers, Arizona Hotshots, and St. Louis BattleHawks.

== Early life ==
Beauharnais was a three-year standout at Saddle Brook High School in Saddle Brook, New Jersey before transferring to Saint Joseph Regional High School in Montvale, New Jersey for his senior season. While at Saint Joseph, he helped guide the Green Knights to an 11–1 record and the Non-Public Group III state title. He was named The Record Defensive Player of the Year as a senior where he recorded 99 tackles, including 11.5 tackles-for-loss.

Considered a three-star recruit by Rivals.com, he was rated as the 71st best outside linebacker in the nation. He accepted a scholarship to Rutgers University.

== College career ==
As a true freshman, Beauharnais moved into the starting lineup for final three games at strongside linebacker, and also appeared on special teams. He played in all 13 games with 36 tackles and five sacks, and was one of two true freshmen to appear in all 13 games. In 2010, he was the starting middle linebacker who appeared in all 12 games. He finished third on the team in tackles (79), he also had six tackles-for-loss along with 1.5 sacks, four quarterback hurries and four fumble recoveries on the year. The following season, as a junior, he finished second on the team in tackles with 77, was first on the team in tackles for loss (16), and also recorded five sacks, three interceptions, one forced fumble and recovered a fumble. In 2012, he started all 13 games at middle linebacker, and was tied for third on the team with 83 tackles (32 solo) and 6 tackles for loss. He was named captain by his teammates and was a semifinalist for the Butkus Award. He also recorded an interception and six quarterback hurries.

== Professional career ==
Pre-draft measurables
Height	Weight	Arm length	Hand span	40-yard dash	10-yard split	20-yard split	20-yard shuttle	Three-cone drill	Vertical jump	Broad jump	Bench press
6 ft 0 7/8 in (1.85 m)	240 lb (109 kg)	32 3/4 in (0.83 m)	9 1/8 in (0.23 m)	4.67 s	1.61 s	2.74 s	4.20 s	6.99 s	33.0 in (0.84 m)	9 ft 10 in (3.00 m)	19 reps

=== New England Patriots ===
He was selected by the New England Patriots in the seventh round (235th overall) of the 2013 NFL draft. Beauharnais signed a four-year, $2.2 million contract. The deal includes a $47,592 signing bonus.

Beauharnais was only used sparingly In the 2013 season, playing primarily on special teams. He only recorded one snap on defense, but made the tackle on that play.

=== Washington Redskins ===
Beauharnais signed with the Washington Redskins practice squad on October 8, 2014. He was promoted to the active roster on November 24. He was waived on December 9, but re-signed with the practice squad on December 16. On December 19, Beauharnais was promoted again to the active roster. On May 4, 2015, he was waived by the Redskins.

=== San Francisco 49ers ===
The San Francisco 49ers signed Beauharnais on August 7, 2015.

=== Arizona Hotshots ===
In 2018, Beauharnais signed with the Arizona Hotshots for the 2019 season. The league ceased operations in April 2019.

=== St. Louis BattleHawks ===
In October 2019, Beauharnais was selected by the St. Louis BattleHawks as an open phase selection in the 2020 XFL draft. He was waived on February 25, 2020.
