= Steve Longa =

Cameroonian American football player (born 1994)

No. 58, 54
- Position: Linebacker

Personal information
- Born: September 29, 1994 (age 32); Yaounde, Cameroon
- Listed height: 6 ft 1 in (1.85 m)
- Listed weight: 241 lb (109 kg)

Career information
- High school: Saddle Brook (Saddle Brook, New Jersey, U.S.)
- College: Rutgers (2012–2015)
- NFL draft: 2016: undrafted

Career history
- Seattle Seahawks (2016)*; Detroit Lions (2016–2019)
- * Offseason or practice squad member only

Awards and highlights
- Third-team All-Big Ten (2015)

Career NFL statistics
- Total tackles: 28
- Stats at Pro Football Reference

Steven Longa (born September 29, 1994) is a Cameroonian-American former professional football player who was a linebacker for the Detroit Lions of the National Football League (NFL). He played high school football at Saddle Brook High School in Saddle Brook, New Jersey, where he earned All-State honors his senior year. He played college football at Rutgers, where he was a three-year letterman. In 2013, Longa was named a Freshman All-American after leading NCAA Division I in tackles by a freshman with 123. He was named third-team All-Big Ten Conference in 2015. He started 37 games during his college career and recorded 342 tackles, which was the third most in school history. Longa forwent his final year of college eligibility to enter the 2016 NFL draft. After going undrafted, he signed with the Seattle Seahawks. He was released by the Seahawks before the start of the 2016 season and was then signed by the Lions, with whom he played for until 2019. Longa was primarily a special teams player during his NFL career; 493 of his 561 careers snaps were on special teams.

== Early life ==
Steven Longa was born on September 29, 1994, in Yaoundé, Cameroon. He lived in Yaoundé before moving to the United States at the age of 12. His family settled in Saddle Brook, New Jersey, where he attended Saddle Brook High School and was recruited to play American football, a sport he had never played before. He began playing football his freshman year of high school.

Longa played linebacker and running back at Saddle Brook High School. He earned second-team honors in the Carpenter division of the Bergen-Passaic Scholastic League (BPSL) in his sophomore year in 2009. He totaled 76 tackles, four sacks, 751 rushing yards and eight rushing touchdowns his junior year in 2010, earning first-team honors in the Meadowlands B division of the North Jersey Interscholastic Conference (NJIC). As a senior in 2011, the team started the season with 10 straight wins before losing in the Group 1 North 1 semi-final. Longa recorded over 70 tackles and over 1,000 rushing yards his senior season, earning All-Group 1, All-State, All-North Jersey, and All-Bergen County honors. He accepted an invitation to play in the 2011 Chesapeake Bowl, a senior-only all-star game featuring players from New Jersey, Pennsylvania, Delaware, Maryland, Washington, D.C., Virginia and West Virginia. He also participated in track at Saddle Brook High.

In the class of 2012, Longa was rated a four-star athlete recruit, the No. 31 athlete in the country and the No. 9 overall prospect in New Jersey by ESPN.com: a three-star outside linebacker recruit, the No. 33 outside linebacker in the country and the No. 8 overall prospect in New Jersey by Rivals.com: a three-star outside linebacker recruit, the No. 42 outside linebacker in the country and the No. 11 overall prospect in New Jersey by 247Sports.com: and a two-star recruit and the No. 110 outside linebacker in the country by Scout.com. He was also rated both a three-star recruit, the No. 59 outside linebacker in the country and the No. 17 overall prospect in New Jersey on 247Sports.com's composite rating, which takes into account the ratings of all the other major recruiting services in the country.

He committed to play college football for Rutgers in May 2011. He also had offers from Boston College, Connecticut, FIU, Maryland, Monmouth, Northwestern, Syracuse, Temple, Villanova, Western Michigan and Youngstown State.

== College career ==
Longa was a three-year letterman for the Rutgers Scarlet Knights of Rutgers University from 2013 to 2015. He was redshirted in 2012.

In June 2013, he was named a Preseason first-team All-Freshman by Athlon Sports. Longa played in 13 games, all starts, at middle linebacker in 2013. His 123 tackles were the most by a Rutgers player and the most by any NCAA Division I freshman that year. He also led all NCAA Division I freshmen in tackles per game with 9.5. Longa had three sacks, two forced fumbles, one fumble recovery and four pass breakups as well. He was named a first-team Freshman All-American by Sporting News, a second-team Freshman All-American by Athlon Sports and a second-team Freshman All-American by Phil Steele. He was also named second-team All-American Athletic Conference by Phil Steele. Longa shared team defensive MVP honors with lineman Marcus Thompson.

He moved to weakside linebacker during spring practice in 2014. In June 2014, he was named second-team Preseason All-Big Ten Conference by Athlon Sports and first-team Preseason All-Big Ten by Phil Steele. Longa appeared in 13 games, all starts, at weakside linebacker in 2014. He again led the team in tackles with 102. He also had two sacks, one forced fumble, one fumble recovery and one pass breakup.

In June 2015, Longa was named Preseason first-team All-Big Ten by Phil Steele and third-team Preseason All-Big Ten by Athlon Sports. In July 2015, he was named to the watch list for the Lombardi Award, which is given to the best lineman or linebacker in the country. He played in 11 games, all starts, in 2015 at weakside linebacker. Longa missed the game against Army on November 21 due to injury. He led the team in tackles with 117 and in forced fumbles with two. He also recorded two sacks and two pass breakups. Longa had a career-high 19 tackles against Ohio State on October 24. His 19 tackles was tied for the most by any Big Ten player in a game that season. He was named Honorable Mention All-Big Ten by the coaches and third-team All-Big Ten by the media. Longa was also named the team's defensive MVP.

Longa started 37 career games for the Scarlet Knights and recorded 342 tackles, which was the third most in school history. He became the second player in school history to have three seasons with at least 100 tackles. He also had seven career sacks, seven pass breakups, five forced fumbles and two fumble recoveries. Longa majored in labor studies and employment relations at Rutgers. On December 22, 2015, he announced that he would forgo his final year of college eligibility and enter the 2016 NFL draft.

== Professional career ==
=== Pre-draft ===
Longa was rated the 17th best inside linebacker in the 2016 draft by NFLDraftScout.com. Lance Zierlein of NFL.com predicted that he would be drafted in the sixth or seventh rounds. Zierlein stated that "Longa could factor in as an eventual starter at some point, but he might have to prove himself on special teams early in his career to earn his initial roster spot."

Pre-draft measurables
Height	Weight	Arm length	Hand span	40-yard dash	10-yard split	20-yard split	20-yard shuttle	Three-cone drill	Vertical jump	Broad jump	Bench press
6 ft 1 in (1.85 m)	241 lb (109 kg)	32 in (0.81 m)	9 3/4 in (0.25 m)	4.78 s	1.67 s	2.79 s	4.56 s	7.50 s	32 in (0.81 m)	9 ft 8 in (2.95 m)	19 reps
All values from NFL Combine

=== Seattle Seahawks ===
Longa signed with the Seattle Seahawks in May 2016 after going undrafted in the 2016 draft. He was released on September 3, 2016.

=== Detroit Lions ===
On September 5, 2016, Longa was signed to the practice squad of the Detroit Lions. He was promoted to the active roster on October 8 and made his NFL debut on October 9 against the Philadelphia Eagles, appearing in 15 snaps on special teams. He was released on October 11 and re-signed to the team's practice squad on October 13.

Longa signed a reserve/future contract with the Lions on January 9, 2017. He appeared in a career-high 15 games in 2017, recording 12 solo tackles and one assisted tackle while appearing in 14 snaps on defense and 302 snaps on special teams. He was inactive for the Week 9 game against the Green Bay Packers.

On August 20, 2018, Longa was placed on injured reserve after suffering a torn ACL. He missed the entire season due to the injury.

On August 31, 2019, he was waived by the Lions and re-signed to the practice squad the next day. Longa was promoted to the active roster on October 26. He appeared in 10 games during the 2019 season, totaling seven solo tackles and eight assisted tackles while playing 54 snaps on defense and 176 snaps on special teams. The Lions released Longa on April 15, 2020.

Overall, he played in 26 games during his NFL career, recording 19 solo tackles and nine assisted tackles while appearing in 68 snaps on defense and 493 snaps on special teams.

== Personal life ==
Longa's father, Etienne Longa, played soccer in Cameroon. Steve became an American citizen in 2019.
