= David Schuman (American football coach) =

David Schuman is the founder and president of Schuman Enterprises, a national high school football camp series. Schuman runs the largest high school football combine and recruitment showcase in the country, The National Underclassmen Combine, and has trained over 30,000 athletes in the US. Formerly, he was the head football coach for the co-operative Palisades Park High School / Leonia High School football team.

== History ==
Raised in Saddle Brook, New Jersey, Schuman was an elite high school football player for Saddle Brook High School, named 1st Team All American as a running back by Bigger Faster Stronger magazine, as well as 3rd All State in New Jersey.

After high school, he earned a full athletic scholarship to the University of Connecticut, where he was a starting linebacker for the UConn Huskies football team. Schuman received a bachelor's and master's degree from the university, as well as the Kendall Madison Award for top student athlete.

After graduating, he spent some time working as a business analyst before opening Schuman's Speed School. In 2004, he started Ultimate 100 Camp, a hand-picked football training camp for elite high school players.
