= Robert H. Ivy =

American plastic surgeon

- Born: May 21, 1881; Southport, Lancashire, England
- Died: 1974
- Education: University of Pennsylvania School of Dental Medicine; Perelman School of Medicine at the University of Pennsylvania
- Occupations: oral and plastic surgeon

Robert H. Ivy (21 May 1881–1974) was an American oral and plastic surgeon who is known to develop the team approach or multidisciplinary treatment involving care of children with Cleft lip and cleft palate. He is one of the early pioneers in the specialty of plastic surgery due to his surgical experience in World War I. During an intermaxillary fixation technique, Ivy Loop (Eyelet Wiring) is named after Dr. Ivy.

== Life and Career ==
He was born on 21 May 1881 at 73c Manchester Road, Southport, Lancashire, England, the son of Robert Sutcliffe Ivy and Annie Edith Cryer. He emigrated to the United States after 1891 and became naturalised in 1913. His uncle was Dr. Matthew Henry Cryer, by whom Robert's father was convinced to travel to the U.S. Robert's father studied dentistry and joined Dr. Cryer at his practice. Dr. Ivy went back to England to attend the Emmanuel School. At the age of 18 years in 1898, Dr. Ivy attended the University of Pennsylvania School of Dental Medicine at the influence of his uncle, Dr. Cryer. Robert then attended University of Pennsylvania School of Medicine soon after. He served as the first dental intern in the United States in 1901 at the Philadelphia General Hospital. Upon the request of his father, Robert interrupted his studies during the 3rd year of medical school and went to China to practice dentistry. After returning from China, Robert completed his medical school education.

Dr. Vilrary P. Blair had a tremendous influence on Dr. Ivy's career as an oral surgeon. Dr. Ivy worked as an assistant to Dr. Blair at the Surgeon's General Office in Washington in 1917. Later, he was assigned to Base Hospital in France, which saw a lot of patients with face, head, and jaw injuries. Dr. Ivy also learned French during his stay in France, practicing oral surgery during World War I.

Dr. Ivy played an instrumental role in making the Journal of Plastic and Reconstructive Surgery one of the world's first academic journals on plastic surgery. The Robert H. Ivy Pennsylvania Plastic Surgery Society, formed in 1954, was named in honor of Dr. Ivy. Dr. Ivy also authored Applied Anatomy and Oral Surgery for Dental Students, an important dentistry textbook.

== Positions ==
- Journal of Plastic and Reconstructive Surgery - Chief Editor (1942)
- Bureau of Maternal and Child Health of Pennsylvania, Cleft Palate Division - Director (1919)
- American Society of Plastic Surgeons - President
- American Board of Plastic Surgery - Founding Member (1938)
- Blockley Almshouse - First Dental Intern (1901-1903)

== Awards ==
- Alumni Award of Merit - Alumni Society of University of Pennsylvania
- Strittmatter Award - Philadelphia County Medical Society (1946)
- Trimble Lecture Award
- First Award by the Foundation of American Society of Plastic and Reconstructive Surgery
