= National Underclassmen Combine =

National Underclassman Combine
- Industry: Football Evaluation/Sports Recruiting
- Founder: David Schuman
- Headquarters: Roseland, New Jersey, U.S.
- Number of locations: Numerous throughout the U.S.
- Area served: United States
- Services: Football Camps, Football Combines, 7v7 Tournaments, Youth Tournaments, Recruiting Analysis, NFL Analysis
- Website: National Underclassman Homepage

The National Underclassmen Combine/NUC Sports is a professional, privately owned recruiting program and three-day training and assessment function for high school football players to display their skills and potential. It is one of the largest and most successful programs of its kind, the purpose of which is to connect talented football athletes with collegiate programs willing to offer them a scholarship. Notable players to go through the system include Joe Haden, cornerback for the NFL's Cleveland Browns, and Marcus Lattimore, star running back for the University of South Carolina. Founded by former University of Connecticut linebacker David Schuman, the first combine event was held in New Jersey in 2005.

== Combine structure ==
A typical weekend combine organized by National Underclassmen is a three-day event. The first day consists of preparatory events: combine prep training, positions skill training and All American recruiting. Day 2 includes the actual combines: tests of athletic ability and football-specific skills. Seventh through ninth graders participate in the morning, while sophomores and juniors work out during the afternoon...

The tests and drills on day two of the combine allow athletes to gauge their abilities against competition. Standard drills include the 40-yard dash, shuttle run, bench press and vertical leap. National Underclassmen Combine also administers position-specific drills, such as throwing strength and accuracy, catching ability, and offensive and defensive line work.

Day three consists of special events such as a 7-on-7 tournament and "trench warfare" for linesmen. Additionally, an awards ceremony for the most exceptional athletes of the weekend is held at the end of day three. Event managers hand out the overall MVP (most valuable player) award and positional MVP awards, as well as a number of other awards, including Strongest Man and Combine King.

The top participants from all of the national combines are invited to take part in the regional Ultimate 100 camps. According to the National Underclassmen website, 50 percent of those invited to an Ultimate 100 camp go on to play college football at the Division 1 or 1aa level. The format of these camps is similar to the standard National Underclassmen weekend combine. The first Ultimate 100 camp was held in 2006.

== Issues with recruitment of young athletes ==
The recruitment of young players is not without controversy. Some coaches and parents worry that, just as in the classroom, some athletes may not "test" well and therefore have a blemish on their recruiting record, not to mention the potential psychological damage of falling short of their goals. Others have expressed concern that combines are too expensive for some families.
