= Smoke Rise (community) =

Gated community in Morris County, New Jersey, US

- Gated community
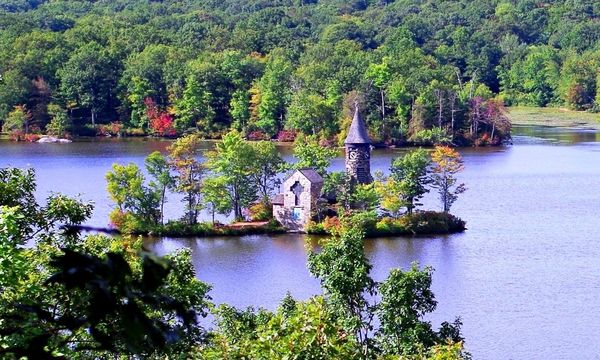
- St. Hubert's Chapel on Lake Kinnelon

- Location in Morris County Location in New Jersey Location in the United States
- Coordinates: 40.9953756°N 74.4023751°W
- Country: United States
- State: New Jersey
- County: Morris
- Borough: Kinnelon
- Elevation: 837 ft (255 m)
- ZIP code: 07405
- GNIS feature ID: 880670

Smoke Rise is an upscale gated lakeside community within Kinnelon in Morris County, in the U.S. state of New Jersey. The community was created out of the estate of Francis Kinney, a 19th-century industrialist who founded Kinney Brothers Tobacco Company. The Kinney estate dates back to the 1880s, when Francis Kinney, a pioneer in the tobacco industry, built a huge "summer cottage" here. His son, Morris Kinney, for whom the borough of Kinnelon was named 41 years later, lived most of his life on the estate.

The community encompasses the 19-acre (7.7 ha) Lake Kinnelon and more than 900 homes located on 3,500 acres (1,400 ha). Smoke Rise was planned with philosophy that no two homes would look alike with a minimum size of 2,500 square feet (230 m^{2}) located on wooded lots of 1 to 10 acres (0.40 to 4.05 ha).

The gated lakeside community provides 24-hour security, activities, clubs and special events.

== History ==
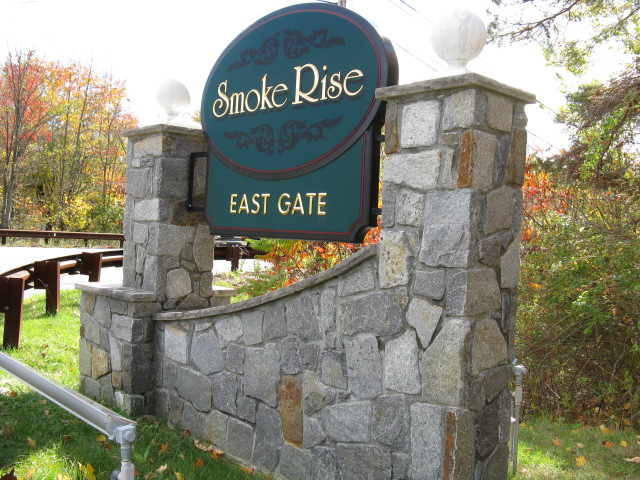
Smoke Rise East Gate Entrance

During the early part of the 20th century, like much of Morris County at the time, the area became a haven for the wealthy who were attracted by the isolation and natural beauty. The most notable example of this was Francis S. Kinney, a 19th-century industrialist who founded Kinney Brothers Tobacco Company and built an estate that dates back to 1883.

One of the largest private holdings in Morris County at any time, Kinney purchased upwards of 5,000 acres (20 km^{2}) of land and built a large "summer cottage" known as Smoke Rise, which is a translation of the Pequannock Native American name for the mountainous area, where a heavy mist often rises at sunset. His son, Morris Kinney, for whom the borough of Kinnelon was named 41 years later, lived most of his life on the estate.

On February 20, 1922, with only 400 full-time residents, Kinnelon was formed as a borough by an act of the New Jersey Legislature from portions of Pequannock Township, based on the results of a referendum passed on March 21, 1922.

Upon Morris Kinney's death in 1945, he left the estate to longtime friend John Talbot Sr., former mayor of the borough, and a founder of the Chilton Memorial Hospital, Pompton Plains (John Talbot Sr. was a real estate developer in New York City and a patron of the arts and was credited with the revival of ballet as a major art form in the United States in the 1930s), as a tribute to their lifetime friendship and mutually shared love of Smoke Rise.

Following the Second World War, the need for suburban housing became evident, John Talbot Sr. went on to create the Smoke Rise Club, one of the earliest community club plans in the United States. Unlike many developers, he insisted that the land be kept in its natural state as far as possible. When friends asked to purchase land on the estate to build homes, Talbot decided to develop a planned community designed primarily to serve New York corporation executives. The Smoke Rise Club was the result in November 1946.

Talbot's intention was to develop the property as a residential club community akin to Tuxedo Park in nearby Orange County, New York; envisioning a community of architect-designed houses suitable for ideal country living. By October 1951, more than 100 families were living in Smoke Rise and community services at St. Hubert’s Chapel were revived for the first time since 1923, when it was used as a private chapel. The development of Smoke Rise largely spurred much of the borough's growth and rising home values in the 1950s; enhancing Kinnelon's standing as a residential suburb.

In 1956, the interdenominational Smoke Rise Community Church was established near the North Gate entrance. By August 1966, there were 500 homes in Smoke Rise.

The private family friendly community is located entirely within Kinnelon and is administered by residents elected to the Board of Governors of the Smoke Rise Club, which must approve all residents' building plans. The community features over 40 miles (64 km) of roadway and over 900 houses on 2,500 acres (10 km^{2}). Entry into the community can only accessed through two gates, the North Gate and East Gate.

=== St. Hubert's Chapel ===
Smoke Rise is notably home to Lake Kinnelon and Kitty Ann Mountain, the highest point in Kinnelon. On an island in the lake is St. Hubert's Chapel, built by Mr. Kinney in 1886 and named after his favorite patron saint of the hunt. It was built in the style of an 8th-century stone chapel in tribute to the saint who lived in the 7th and 8th centuries.

Sometime later, Kinney commissioned Louis Comfort Tiffany to expand and enhance the chapel including a Celtic cross stained glass window and a Tiffany-signed mosaic floor among other things. While in private hands, the Chapel stopped holding services until they were revived in 1951. The Chapel is owned by the Smoke Rise Club who can be contacted for more information including tours. Kitty Ann mountain offers views of northern New Jersey and the distant New York City skyline at an elevation of 1,140 feet (350 m) from the Smoke Rise Tower.

== Community ==
The neighborhood also includes one church, the Community Church of Smoke Rise, the Smoke Rise Village Inn, the Smoke Rise Tennis Club and other recreation facilities. It is home to the Kinnelon Volunteer Fire Company - Company 3 Fire House. The Village Inn and the Community Church are open to members and non-members of the community.

== Location ==
Smoke Rise residents enjoy the close proximity to New York City. Nearby highways include Interstate 287, Route 23, and Route 208. The population consists of a vast variety of professionals, entrepreneurs, and executives.

The community has two entrances: one from Route 23 south (North Gate) and the other from Kinnelon Road (East Gate).

== Notable people ==
People who were born in, residents of, or otherwise closely associated with Smoke Rise include:

- Scott Allen (born 1949), retired figure skater who was the 1964 Olympic bronze medalist, the 1965 world silver medalist, and the 1964 and 1966 U.S. national champion
- Rand Araskog (1931–2021), manufacturing executive, investor, and writer who served as the CEO of ITT Corporation
- Missy Elliott (born 1971), rapper, singer, songwriter, record producer, dancer, and philanthropist
- Herbert O. Fisher (1909–1990), test pilot and an aviation executive
- Oz Griebel (1949–2020), banker, lawyer, and political candidate who ran for Governor of Connecticut
- Rene Joyeuse (1920-2012), World War II operative, spy and saboteur with the OSS, who was a physician, professor and researcher, co-founder of the American Trauma Society and the first person born in Switzerland to be honored with a burial in Arlington National Cemetery
- Stearns Matthews (born 1984), cabaret singer, recording artist, director, teacher and pianist
- Harry L. Towe (1898–1977), Congressman who represented New Jersey's 9th congressional district from 1943 to 1951
