= Kinnelon High School =

High school in Morris County, New Jersey, US

Location
- 121 Kinnelon Road; Kinnelon, Morris County, New Jersey 07405; United States; 40.999398°N 74.37504°W

Information
- Type: Public high school
- Established: 1962
- School district: Kinnelon Public Schools
- NCES School ID: 340804004282
- Principal: Jennifer Oluwole
- Faculty: 48.0 FTEs
- Grades: 9-12
- Enrollment: 507 (as of 2024–25)
- Student to teacher ratio: 10.6:1
- Colors: Dark green and white
- Athletics conference: Northwest Jersey Athletic Conference (general); North Jersey Super Football Conference (football)
- Team name: Colts
- Website: khs.kinnelonpublicschools.org

Kinnelon High School is a four-year comprehensive community public high school that serves students in ninth through twelfth grades from Kinnelon in Morris County, in the U.S. state of New Jersey, operating as the lone secondary school of the Kinnelon Public Schools.

As of the 2024–25 school year, the school had an enrollment of 507 students and 48.0 classroom teachers (on an FTE basis), for a student–teacher ratio of 10.6:1. There were 29 students (5.7% of enrollment) eligible for free lunch and 5 (1.0% of students) eligible for reduced-cost lunch.

== History ==
After the Kinnelon and West Milford school districts were notified in August 1959 that their students would no longer be accommodated at Butler High School within two to three years, the two districts joined in discussions with the Bloomingdale School District for the establishment of a regional school district.

By a margin of one percent, equal to 12 votes out of 1,162 cast, voters approved a January 1960 referendum that allocated $2 million (equivalent to $21.3 million in 2025) for the construction of a building on a 54-acre (22 ha) site that would be designed to accommodate a maximum capacity of 840 to 1,000 students, and would open starting with grades 7-10 and adding a grade over the next two years.

With the new high school coming to Kinnelon, the Riverdale School District sought approval in August 1960 from the state for a plan to shift its students out of Butler High School to attend school in Kinnelon for grades 7-12.

The athletic team name of "Colts" and the school colors of green and white were chosen in an April 1962 poll of students from Kinnelon and Riverdale who were in grades 6-9 at Butler High School who would constitute the initial incoming student body at Kinnelon High School.

The school opened in phases starting in October 1962 as sections of the facility were completed and had 620 students in its inaugural year, including 200 from Riverdale, who attended as part of a sending/receiving relationship.

In 1991, Riverdale ended their sending/receiving relationship with Kinnelon and started sending their high school students to Pompton Lakes for financial reasons and proximity.

== Awards, recognition and rankings ==
The school was the 20th-ranked public high school in New Jersey out of 339 schools statewide in New Jersey Monthly magazine's September 2014 cover story on the state's "Top Public High Schools", using a new ranking methodology. The school had been ranked 5th in the state of 328 schools in 2012, after being ranked 21st in 2010 out of 322 schools listed. The magazine ranked the school 34th in the magazine's September 2008 issue, and 35th in its September 2006 issue, both of which included 316 schools across the state. Schooldigger.com ranked the school tied for 90th out of 381 public high schools statewide in its 2011 rankings (a decrease of 62 positions from the 2010 ranking) which were based on the combined percentage of students classified as proficient or above proficient on the mathematics (87.5%) and language arts literacy (96.5%) components of the High School Proficiency Assessment (HSPA).

In its listing of "America's Best High Schools 2016", the school was ranked 473rd out of 500 best high schools in the country; it was ranked 49th among all high schools in New Jersey and 32nd among the state's non-magnet schools.

In its 2013 report on "America's Best High Schools", The Daily Beast ranked the school 591st in the nation among participating public high schools and 46th among schools in New Jersey.

In the 2011 "Ranking America's High Schools" issue by The Washington Post, the school was ranked 39th in New Jersey and 1,217th nationwide.

== Athletics ==
The Kinnelon High School Colts compete in the Northwest Jersey Athletic Conference, which is comprised of public and private high schools in Morris, Sussex and Warren counties, and was established following a reorganization of sports leagues in Northern New Jersey by the New Jersey State Interscholastic Athletic Association (NJSIAA). Prior to the 2009-10 realignment, the school had competed in the Colonial Hills Conference, which included high schools in Essex, Morris and Somerset counties. With 490 students in grades 10-12, the school was classified by the NJSIAA for the 2019–20 school year as Group II for most athletic competition purposes, which included schools with an enrollment of 486 to 758 students in that grade range. The football team competes in the American Blue division of the North Jersey Super Football Conference, which includes 112 schools competing in 20 divisions, making it the nation's biggest football-only high school sports league. The school was classified by the NJSIAA as Group I North for football for 2024–2026, which included schools with 254 to 474 students.

The school participates as the host school / lead agency in a joint ice hockey team with Jefferson Township High School and Sparta High School. The co-op program operates under agreements ending in June 2028.

The boys' cross country team won the Group I state championship in 1967 and 2022, and won the Group II title in 1970.

The boys' tennis team won the Group I state title in 1980, defeating Mahwah High School in the semifinals by 5-0 and then Bernardsville High School by 3-2 in the tournament final.

The girls' soccer team won the Group I state championship in 2006 (against Metuchen High School in the final game of the tournament) and in 2014 (vs. Shore Regional High School). In 2006, the team won the North I Group I tournament, defeating Cresskill High School by a score of 5-0 in the final game. The team then moved on to win the overall Group I state championship less than two weeks later, defeating Metuchen by a score of 2-1 in the championship game played at The College of New Jersey, winning the school's first state championship in any sport in nearly 40 years. The 2008 team became the first Group II school to win the Morris County Tournament championship. At the time it was considered to be an accomplishment that topped their previous year's state championship because the county tournament presented the challenge of much larger schools than they did during their run to the 2006 Group I state title. The following year, the team shared the county title with West Morris Central High School. In 2014, the team defeated Park Ridge High School to win the North I Group I sectional title. They then defeated the favored Glen Ridge High School squad, winners of the two previous Group I titles, by a score of 2-1 to reach the Group I semifinals. Going into the finals as underdogs again, they beat the 2013 Group I co-champions, Shore Regional by a final score of 2-0 to win the school's second state championship. It was a season in which the team had started at 4-4, but won 16 of the ir last 17, to finish the season with a school record 20 wins.

The girls' basketball team won the 2007 North I Group I sectional championship with a 48-37 win over Butler High School.

Also in 2008, the boys' soccer team won the North I, Group I championship, the first in the team's history, beating Wallington High School by a 4-1 margin in the sectional title game. The Colts then played then 9h-ranked Harrison to a 0-0 tie in the semi-final game, but Harrison advanced to the state finals on penalty kicks.

In 2008, the Kinnelon ice hockey team beat the Jefferson Township High School Falcons at the Prudential Center to win the Public B state tournament. The win was the team's first ever state championship.

In 2009, the boys' lacrosse team finished the season with a 16-6 record after winning the Group I state championship, defeating Chatham High School by a score of 11-9 in the title game.

The football team, which had been winless in all previous playoff games, won their first state championship in 2012, beating New Milford High School 26-14 to earn the state North I, Group II sectional title. On November 14, 2014, Kinnelon quarterback Kyle Presti set a New Jersey state record, with nine touchdown passes in a 68-42 victory over Sussex Technical High School, breaking the previous record of eight that had been achieved twice since 2010.

The girls tennis team won the Group I state championship in 2017, defeating Mountain Lakes High School by 4-1 in the tournament final.

== Administration ==
The school's principal is Jennifer Oluwole. Her administration team includes the assistant principal.

== Notable alumni ==
- Scott Allen (born 1949), retired figure skater who was the 1964 Olympic bronze medalist, the 1965 world silver medalist, and the 1964 and 1966 U.S. national champion
- Kurt Allerman (born 1955, class of 1973), linebacker who played for nine seasons in the NFL, for the Green Bay Packers, Arizona Cardinals and Detroit Lions
- Laura Benanti (born 1979, class of 1997), television, film and Tony-winning Broadway actress
- Bryan Gallego (born 1993, class of 2011) professional soccer player
- Oz Griebel (1949–2020), banker, lawyer, and political candidate who ran for Governor of Connecticut as a third-party candidate, winning 3.9% of the vote
- Stearns Matthews (born 1984), cabaret singer, recording artist, director, teacher and pianist
- William A. Pailes (born 1952, class of 1970), astronaut who carried a school pennant into space aboard the Space Shuttle Atlantis on mission STS-51-J in 1985
- Elise Testone (born 1983), singer and American Idol contestant
