= Kinnelon, New Jersey =

Borough in Morris County, New Jersey, US

- Borough
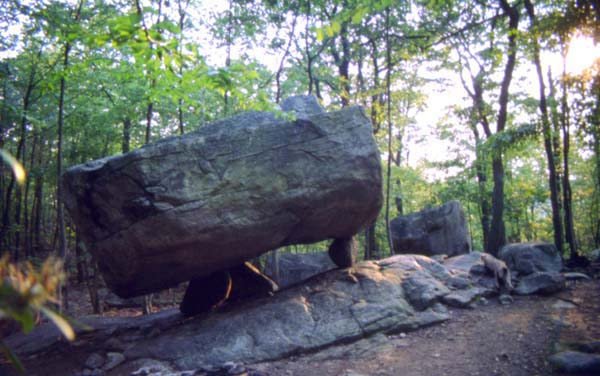
- Tripod Rock in Pyramid Mountain County Park

- Seal

- Location of Kinnelon in Morris County highlighted in red (right). Inset map: Location of Morris County in New Jersey highlighted in orange (left).

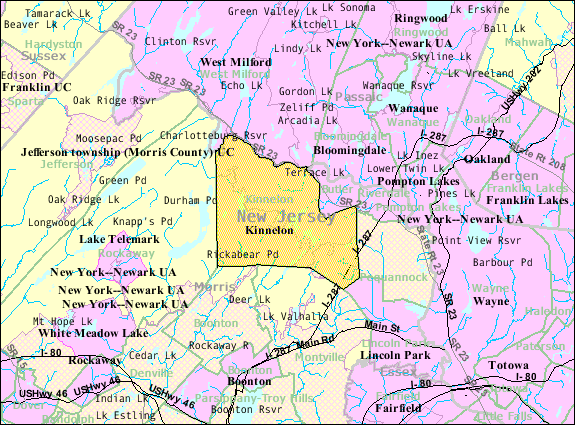
- Census Bureau map of Kinnelon, New Jersey

- Location in Morris County Location in New Jersey Location in the United States
- Coordinates: 40.982036°N 74.385896°W
- Country: United States
- State: New Jersey
- County: Morris
- Incorporated: March 21, 1922
- Named for: Francis S. Kinney

Government
  - Type: Borough
  - Body: Borough Council
  - Mayor: James J. Freda (R, term ends December 31, 2026)
  - Municipal clerk: Karen Iuele

Area
  - Total: 19.25 sq mi (49.86 km^{2})
  - Land: 18.04 sq mi (46.73 km^{2})
  - Water: 1.21 sq mi (3.13 km^{2}) 6.27%
  - Rank: 146th of 565 in state 10th of 39 in county
- Elevation: 699 ft (213 m)

Population (2020)
  - Total: 9,966
  - Estimate (2023): 10,009
  - Rank: 246th of 565 in state 20th of 39 in county
  - Density: 552.8/sq mi (213.4/km^{2})
  - Rank: 437th of 565 in state 33rd of 39 in county
- Time zone: UTC−05:00 (Eastern (EST))
  - Summer (DST): UTC−04:00 (Eastern (EDT))
- ZIP Code: 07405
- Area codes: 201 and 973
- FIPS code: 3402737110
- GNIS feature ID: 0885269
- Website: www.kinnelonboro.org

Kinnelon (/ˈkɪnəlɒn/) is a borough in Morris County, in the U.S. state of New Jersey, located approximately 33 miles (53 km) west of New York City. As of the 2020 United States census, the borough's population was 9,966, a decrease of 282 (−2.8%) from the 2010 census count of 10,248, which in turn reflected an increase of 883 (+9.4%) from the 9,365 counted in the 2000 census. It is a low-density, suburban community, with many parks and trails.

Once known as Charlotteburg, Kinnelon was formed as a borough by an act of the New Jersey Legislature on February 20, 1922, from portions of Pequannock Township, based on the results of a referendum passed on March 21, 1922. The borough's name comes from Francis S. Kinney, who purchased 5,000 acres (20 km^{2}) of land in the 1880s for an estate that included Lake Kinnelon, and built St. Hubert's Chapel in 1886 on an island in the lake.

Kinnelon is home to Smoke Rise, a private gated community that describes itself as one of the oldest gated communities in the United States. It includes more than 900 unique homes located on 3,500 acres (1,400 ha) in addition to Lake Kinnelon and Kitty Ann Mountain.

In 2012, Forbes.com listed Kinnelon as 462nd in its listing of "America's Most Expensive ZIP Codes", with a median home price of $630,414.

The borough is one of the state's highest-income communities. Based on data from the American Community Survey (ACS) for 2014–2018, Kinnelon residents had a median household income of $156,048, almost double the statewide median of $79,363.

== History ==
Then still part of Pequannock Township and known as Charlotteburg (named after Charlotte, wife of King George III of Great Britain), early settlements in the Kinnelon area date back to the late 17th century when iron forges and furnaces were first established. Mining and forest cropping were major occupations of the earliest settlers. The construction of the Morris Canal in the early 1820s led to a significant decline in the mining industry, after which the land was sold over time.

During the early part of the 20th century, like much of Morris County at the time, the area became a haven for the wealthy who were attracted by the isolation and natural beauty. The most notable example of this was Francis S. Kinney, a 19th-century industrialist who founded Kinney Brothers Tobacco Company and built an estate that dates back to 1883.

One of the largest private holdings in Morris County at any time, Kinney purchased upwards of 5,000 acres (20 km^{2}) of land and built a large "summer cottage" known as Smoke Rise, which is a translation of the Pequannock Native American name for the mountainous area, where a heavy mist often rises at sunset. Francis Kinney referred to the estate as "Kinney Lawn"; when the borough was formed in 1922, residents adopted "Kinnelon" as a modified form of that name. His son, Morris Kinney, lived most of his life on the estate.

On February 20, 1922, with only 400 full-time residents, Kinnelon was formed as a borough by an act of the New Jersey Legislature from portions of Pequannock Township, based on the results of a referendum passed on March 21, 1922.

After the First World War, some residential development occurred in the borough. In 1925, Frank Fay Jr., a real estate developer, along with his son Frank Fay III, purchased 240 acres of farmland that boasted a small pond, later known as West Lake, to create a summer lake community called Fayson Lakes. The Fays advertised Fayson Lakes widely with ads being placed in The New York Times and New Jersey newspapers; heavily promoting its accessibility and proximity to New York City.

In 1931, an adjoining property featuring a small lake, later known as East Lake, was incorporated into the community. By 1938, an additional parcel of land was purchased and eventually dammed to create a third lake, known as South Lake, in the 1950s. Most homes in the community remained summer residences until the Second World War. Fayson Lakes remains Kinnelon's highest density area.

Upon Morris Kinney's death in 1945, he left the estate to longtime friend John Talbot Sr., former mayor of the borough, and a founder of the Chilton Memorial Hospital, Pompton Plains (John Talbot Sr. was a real estate developer in New York City and a patron of the arts and was credited with the revival of ballet as a major art form in the United States in the 1930s), as a tribute to their lifetime friendship and mutually shared love of Smoke Rise.

Following the Second World War, the need for suburban housing became evident, John Talbot Sr. went on to create The Smoke Rise Club, one of the earliest community club plans in the United States. Unlike many developers, he insisted that the land be kept in its natural state as far as possible. When friends asked to purchase land on the estate to build homes, Talbot decided to develop a planned community designed primarily to serve New York corporation executives. The Smoke Rise Club was the result in November 1946.

Talbot's intention was to develop the property as a residential club community akin to Tuxedo Park in nearby Orange County, New York; envisioning a community of architect-designed houses suitable for ideal country living. By October 1951, more than 100 families were living in Smoke Rise and community services at St. Hubert’s Chapel were revived for the first time since 1923, when it was used as a private chapel. The development of Smoke Rise largely spurred much of the borough's growth and rising home values in the 1950s; enhancing Kinnelon's standing as a residential suburb.

Since the inception of Smoke Rise, there has been nearly double-digit growth in the borough which today consists of three primary sections, Kinnelon proper, Fayson Lakes, and Smoke Rise. In 2005, it was estimated that Fayson Lakes and Smoke Rise accounted for about 42% of all borough households.

In 2000, Kinnelon had the highest home ownership rate in the state.

In 2012, Forbes.com listed Kinnelon as 462nd in its listing of "America's Most Expensive ZIP Codes", with a median home price of $630,414.

== Geography ==
According to the United States Census Bureau, the borough had a total area of 19.24 square miles (49.82 km^{2}), including 18.03 square miles (46.70 km^{2}) of land and 1.21 square miles (3.13 km^{2}) of water (6.27%).

The borough is home to Silas Condict County Park, which covers 1,000 acres (400 ha) and was dedicated in 1964. Tripod Rock is located in Kinnelon's Pyramid Mountain Natural Historical Area, portions of which are located in the borough. Its largest lake is Lake Kinnelon, which is within Smoke Rise, a private gated community of 900 homes located on 3,500 acres (1,400 ha).

Unincorporated communities, localities and place names located partially or completely within the township include Bald Hill, Brook Valley, Charlottesburg, Fayson Lakes, Ideal Lake, Jacksonville, Saw Mill Pond, Smoke Rise, Stickle Pond, Sun Tan Lake, Surprise Lake and Untermeyer Lake.

Splitrock Reservoir is 625 acres (2.53 km^{2}) of wilderness, located on the borders of Kinnelon and Rockaway Township.

The highest mountain in Kinnelon is Kitty Ann Mountain. Located in Smoke Rise, the mountain offers views of northern New Jersey at an elevation of 1,140 feet (350 m) from the Smoke Rise Tower.

Portions of the borough are owned by the City of Newark, Essex County, for their Pequannock River Watershed, which provides water to the city from an area of 35,000 acres (14,000 ha) that also includes portions of Hardyston Township, Jefferson Township, Rockaway Township, Vernon Township and West Milford.

Kinnelon borders the municipalities of Boonton Township, Butler, Lincoln Park, Montville, Pequannock Township, Riverdale and Rockaway Township in Morris County; and West Milford in Passaic County.

== Demographics ==
Historical population
Census	Pop.	Note	%±
1930	428		—
1940	745		74.1%
1950	1,350		81.2%
1960	4,431		228.2%
1970	7,600		71.5%
1980	7,770		2.2%
1990	8,470		9.0%
2000	9,365		10.6%
2010	10,248		9.4%
2020	9,966		−2.8%
2023 (est.)	10,009	▲	0.4%
Population sources:1930 1940–2000 2000; 2010 2020

=== 2020 census ===
As of the 2020 census, Kinnelon had a population of 9,966. The median age was 44.8 years. 22.5% of residents were under the age of 18 and 17.9% were 65 years of age or older. For every 100 females, there were 99.2 males, and for every 100 females age 18 and older, there were 96.6 males.

48.0% of residents lived in urban areas, while 52.0% lived in rural areas.

There were 3,405 households in Kinnelon, of which 35.6% had children under the age of 18 living in them. Of all households, 71.0% were married-couple households, 9.3% were households with a male householder and no spouse or partner present, and 16.7% were households with a female householder and no spouse or partner present. About 13.8% of all households were made up of individuals and 8.1% had someone living alone who was 65 years of age or older.

There were 3,571 housing units, of which 4.6% were vacant. The homeowner vacancy rate was 1.6% and the rental vacancy rate was 6.3%.

Racial composition as of the 2020 census
Race	Number	Percent
White	8,362	83.9%
Black or African American	97	1.0%
American Indian and Alaska Native	6	0.1%
Asian	610	6.1%
Native Hawaiian and Other Pacific Islander	0	0.0%
Some other race	174	1.7%
Two or more races	717	7.2%
Hispanic or Latino (of any race)	728	7.3%

=== 2010 census ===
The 2010 United States census counted 10,248 people, 3,472 households, and 2,927 families in the borough. The population density was 569.7 per square mile (220.0/km^{2}). There were 3,600 housing units at an average density of 200.1 per square mile (77.3/km^{2}). The racial makeup was 93.05% (9,536) White, 0.91% (93) Black or African American, 0.05% (5) Native American, 4.26% (437) Asian, 0.00% (0) Pacific Islander, 0.51% (52) from other races, and 1.22% (125) from two or more races. Hispanic or Latino of any race were 4.08% (418) of the population.

Of the 3,472 households, 41.8% had children under the age of 18; 74.4% were married couples living together; 7.4% had a female householder with no husband present and 15.7% were non-families. Of all households, 12.8% were made up of individuals and 5.5% had someone living alone who was 65 years of age or older. The average household size was 2.95 and the average family size was 3.24.

27.2% of the population were under the age of 18, 6.6% from 18 to 24, 19.0% from 25 to 44, 35.1% from 45 to 64, and 12.2% who were 65 years of age or older. The median age was 43.5 years. For every 100 females, the population had 99.7 males. For every 100 females ages 18 and older there were 95.8 males.

The Census Bureau's 2006–2010 American Community Survey showed that (in 2010 inflation-adjusted dollars) median household income was $129,664 (with a margin of error of +/− $11,416) and the median family income was $144,318 (+/− $7,698). Males had a median income of $98,094 (+/− $7,382) versus $71,886 (+/− $9,897) for females. The per capita income for the borough was $56,826 (+/− $3,939). About 1.4% of families and 1.5% of the population were below the poverty line, including 1.4% of those under age 18 and 0.8% of those age 65 or over.

=== 2000 census ===
As of the 2000 United States census there were 9,365 people, 3,062 households, and 2,685 families residing in the borough. The population density was 523.5 inhabitants per square mile (202.1/km^{2}). There were 3,123 housing units at an average density of 174.6 per square mile (67.4/km^{2}). The racial makeup of the borough was 95.60% White, 0.58% African American, 0.04% Native American, 2.84% Asian, 0.10% Pacific Islander, 0.23% from other races, and 0.61% from two or more races. Hispanic or Latino people of any race were 2.33% of the population.

There were 3,062 households, out of which 45.4% had children under the age of 18 living with them, 80.6% were married couples living together, 5.3% had a female householder with no husband present, and 12.3% were non-families. 9.4% of all households were made up of individuals, and 3.6% had someone living alone who was 65 years of age or older. The average household size was 3.06 and the average family size was 3.27.

In the borough the population was spread out, with 30.0% under the age of 18, 4.3% from 18 to 24, 27.0% from 25 to 44, 29.7% from 45 to 64, and 9.0% who were 65 years of age or older. The median age was 40 years. For every 100 females, there were 99.6 males. For every 100 females age 18 and over, there were 95.9 males.

The median income for a household in the borough was $105,991, and the median income for a family was $110,593. Males had a median income of $88,870 versus $65,069 for females. The per capita income for the borough was $45,796. About 2.3% of families and 2.6% of the population were below the poverty line, including 2.9% of those under age 18 and 0.6% of those age 65 or over.

== Club communities ==
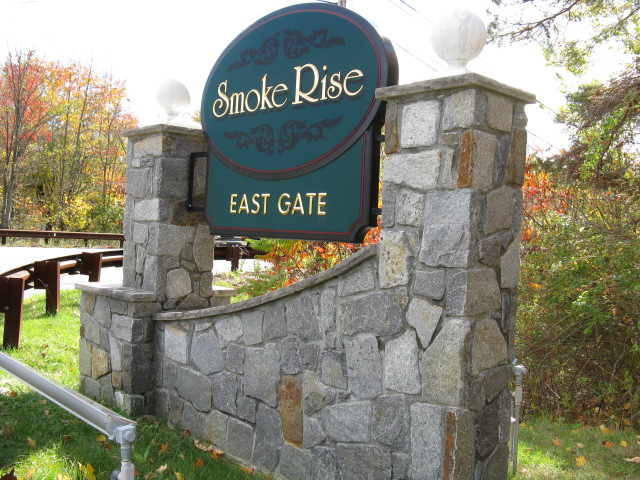
Smoke Rise East Gate Entrance

Kinnelon is home to two club communities: Smoke Rise and Fayson Lakes. In 2005, about 42% of the borough's total households resided between these two communities.

=== Smoke Rise ===
Smoke Rise is a private gated residential community established in 1946. It is one of the oldest gated communities in the United States, boasting over 900 unique homes located on 3,500 acres (1,400 ha) in addition to Lake Kinnelon and Kitty Ann Mountain.

=== Fayson Lakes ===
Fayson Lakes was founded in 1925 around three lakes located in the southeastern corner of the borough. It is named for the developers who started the community, Frank Fay Jr. and his son Frank Fay III. It has a variety of homes of different sizes and styles ranging from rustic winterized cabins to opulent custom-built homes.

== Parks and recreation ==
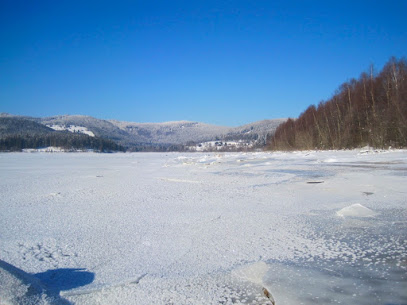
The Kittatinny Valley on top of frozen Lake Kinnelon, next to Kitty Ann Mountain, which reaches 1,152 feet (351 m) in height

- Silas Condict County Park was established in 1963 and includes picnic areas, athletic fields, hiking trails, and the Casino, an old house that was used as a speakeasy in the Prohibition era. The Casino is used for parties, rentals, and other events. Home to a large lake for fishing and paddle boating, paddle boats are available to rent. The park is operated by the Morris County Park Commission.
- Stony Brook Park features recreational areas and playgrounds surrounded by a lake.

== Economy ==
- Meadtown Shopping Center – a shopping center located on Route 23 in Kinnelon. It features numerous stores and restaurants.

== Government ==
=== Local government ===
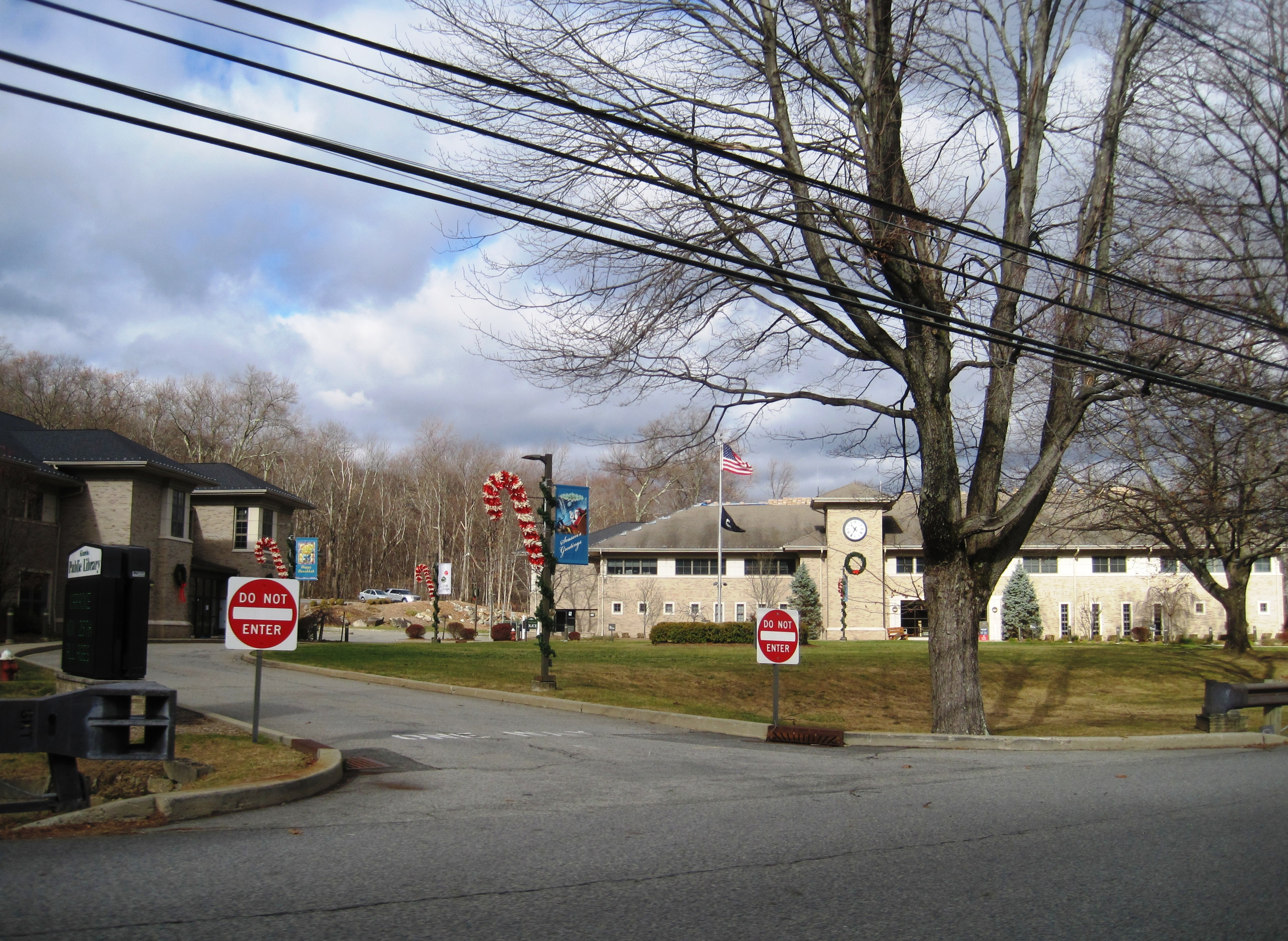
Kinnelon municipal complex on Kinnelon Road

Kinnelon is governed under the borough form of New Jersey municipal government, which is used in 218 municipalities (of the 564) statewide, making it the most common form of government in New Jersey. The governing body is comprised of a mayor and a borough council, with all positions elected at-large on a partisan basis as part of the November general election. A mayor is elected directly by the voters to a four-year term of office. The borough council includes six members elected to serve three-year terms on a staggered basis, with two seats coming up for election each year in a three-year cycle. The borough form of government used by Kinnelon is a "weak mayor / strong council" government in which council members act as the legislative body with the mayor presiding at meetings and voting only in the event of a tie. The mayor can veto ordinances subject to an override by a two-thirds majority vote of the council. The mayor makes committee and liaison assignments for council members, and most appointments are made by the mayor with the advice and consent of the council.

As of 2023, the mayor of Kinnelon is Republican James J. Freda, whose term of office ends December 31, 2026. Members of the Borough Council are Council President Sean Mabey (R, 2023), Robert Lewis (R, 2028), Anthony Chirdo (R, 2025), Eric Harriz (R, 2025), Cyndi Frank (R, 2027) and Ronald Reckler (R, 2028).

In January 2017, Glenn Sisco was selected from three candidates nominated by the Republican municipal committee and appointed to fill the council seat expiring in December 2017 that had been held by Adam N. Barish; Sisco, served on an interim basis until the November 2017 general election. Sisco served as the mayor of Kinnelon for 42 years, making him one of the longest-serving mayors in the state of New Jersey.

In March 2016, the Borough Council unanimously selected William Neely from three candidates nominated by the Republican municipal committee to fill the seat expiring in December 2016 that had been held by Stephen Cobell until his resignation the previous month after nearly 12 years in office; Neely will serve on an interim basis until the November 2016 general election, when voters will choose a candidate to serve the balance of the term of office.

Selected by a 3–2 majority of the borough council from among three potential candidates, Clifford Giantonio was sworn into office in April 2014 to fill the vacant seat of Ronald Mondello, who had resigned in the previous month citing personal and work conflicts.

==== Public safety ====
Since 1939, the borough of Kinnelon has been protected by the Kinnelon Police Department, which provides 24/7 coverage.

Since 1930, the Kinnelon Volunteer Fire Department has protected the borough. This organization is staffed 100% by volunteers from in and around the borough and responds to emergencies in Kinnelon and surrounding towns as part of the Morris County Mutual Aid Agreement.

Various organizations are responsible for emergency medical services, some of which are Atlantic Health, Morris County Office of Emergency Management, and the Tri-Boro First Aid Squad.

=== Federal, state and county representation ===
Kinnelon is located in the 11th Congressional District and is part of New Jersey's 25th state legislative district.

For the 119th United States Congress, New Jersey's 11th congressional district is represented by Analilia Mejia (D, Glen Ridge) who was elected in a 2026 special election to serve for the remainder of the Congress following the resignation Mikie Sherrill (D, Montclair), who was elected Governor of New Jersey in 2025. New Jersey is represented in the United States Senate by Democrats Cory Booker (Newark, term ends 2027) and Andy Kim (Moorestown, term ends 2031).

For the 2026–2027 session, the 25th legislative district of the New Jersey Legislature is represented in the State Senate by Anthony M. Bucco (R, Boonton Township) and in the General Assembly by Aura K. Dunn (R, Mendham Borough) and Marisa Sweeney (D, Morristown).

Morris County is governed by a Board of County Commissioners comprised of seven members who are elected at-large in partisan elections to three-year terms on a staggered basis, with either one or three seats up for election each year as part of the November general election. Actual day-to-day operation of departments is supervised by County Administrator Deena Leary.

As of 2026, Morris County's Commissioners (with all terms ending December 31) are Director Stephen H. Shaw (R, Mountain Lakes, 2027), Deputy Director John Krickus (R, Washington Township, 2027), Douglas Cabana (R, Boonton Township, 2028), Thomas J. Mastrangelo (R, Montville, 2028), Christine Myers (R, Harding Township, 2028), Tayfun Selen (R, Chatham Township, 2026), and Deborah Smith (R, Denville Township, 2027).

The county's constitutional officers are County Clerk Ann F. Grossi (R, Parsippany–Troy Hills, 2028), Sheriff James M. Gannon (R, Boonton Township, 2025) and Surrogate Heather Darling (R, Roxbury, 2029).

=== Politics ===
United States presidential election results for Kinnelon 2024 2020 2016 2012 2008 2004
Year	Republican		Democratic		Third party(ies)	
Year	No.	%	No.	%	No.	%
2024	3,727	59.42%	2,429	38.73%	116	1.85%
2020	3,873	56.23%	2,910	42.25%	105	1.52%
2016	3,540	60.14%	2,127	36.14%	219	3.72%
2012	3,497	65.52%	1,772	33.20%	68	1.27%
2008	3,638	62.75%	2,105	36.31%	55	0.95%
2004	3,517	64.57%	1,895	34.79%	35	0.64%

As of March 23, 2011, there were a total of 7,122 registered voters in Kinnelon, of which 1,117 (15.7%) were registered as Democrats, 3,310 (46.5%) were registered as Republicans and 2,694 (37.8%) were registered as Unaffiliated. There was one voter registered to another party.

In the 2012 presidential election, Republican Mitt Romney received 65.5% of the vote (3,497 cast), ahead of Democrat Barack Obama with 33.2% (1,772 votes), and other candidates with 1.3% (68 votes), among the 5,354 ballots cast by the borough's 7,463 registered voters (17 ballots were spoiled), for a turnout of 71.7%. In the 2008 presidential election, Republican John McCain received 62.4% of the vote (3,638 cast), ahead of Democrat Barack Obama with 36.1% (2,105 votes) and other candidates with 0.9% (55 votes), among the 5,829 ballots cast by the borough's 7,334 registered voters, for a turnout of 79.5%. In the 2004 presidential election, Republican George W. Bush received 64.4% of the vote (3,517 ballots cast), outpolling Democrat John Kerry with 34.7% (1,895 votes) and other candidates with 0.5% (35 votes), among the 5,463 ballots cast by the borough's 6,955 registered voters, for a turnout percentage of 78.5.

Gubernatorial election results for Kinnelon
Year	Republican		Democratic		Third party(ies)	
Year	No.	%	No.	%	No.	%
2025	2,946	58.80%	2,041	40.74%	23	0.46%
2021	2,712	64.33%	1,485	35.22%	19	0.45%
2017	1,833	59.28%	1,205	38.97%	54	1.75%
2013	2,419	75.26%	754	23.46%	41	1.28%
2009	2,669	66.74%	1,032	25.81%	298	7.45%
2005	2,160	64.21%	1,134	33.71%	70	2.08%

In the 2013 gubernatorial election, Republican Chris Christie received 75.3% of the vote (2,419 cast), ahead of Democrat Barbara Buono with 23.5% (754 votes), and other candidates with 1.3% (41 votes), among the 3,260 ballots cast by the borough's 7,424 registered voters (46 ballots were spoiled), for a turnout of 43.9%. In the 2009 gubernatorial election, Republican Chris Christie received 66.2% of the vote (2,669 ballots cast), ahead of Democrat Jon Corzine with 25.6% (1,032 votes), Independent Chris Daggett with 5.9% (237 votes) and other candidates with 1.5% (61 votes), among the 4,034 ballots cast by the borough's 7,167 registered voters, yielding a 56.3% turnout.

United States Senate election results for Kinnelon1
Year	Republican		Democratic		Third party(ies)	
Year	No.	%	No.	%	No.	%
2024	3,598	60.26%	2,281	38.20%	92	1.54%
2018	3,108	62.91%	1,695	34.31%	137	2.77%
2012	3,211	65.81%	1,606	32.92%	62	1.27%
2006	2,242	65.44%	1,137	33.19%	47	1.37%

United States Senate election results for Kinnelon2
Year	Republican		Democratic		Third party(ies)	
Year	No.	%	No.	%	No.	%
2020	3,787	57.17%	2,755	41.59%	82	1.24%
2014	2,080	62.86%	1,178	35.60%	51	1.54%
2013	1,521	66.07%	752	32.67%	29	1.26%
2008	3,427	65.33%	1,751	33.38%	68	1.30%

== Education ==
The Kinnelon Public Schools serves students in pre-kindergarten through twelfth grade. As of the 2020–21 school year, the district, comprised of four schools, had an enrollment of 1,670 students and 165.0 classroom teachers (on an FTE basis), for a student–teacher ratio of 10.1:1. Schools in the district (with 2020–21 enrollment data from the National Center for Education Statistics) are Kiel Elementary School with 312 students in grades Pre-K–2, Stonybrook Elementary School with 346 students in grades 3–5, Pearl R. Miller Middle School with 427 students in grades 6–8 and Kinnelon High School with 570 students in grades 9–12. In 2016, Kinnelon High School was named #3 in the state by New Jersey Monthly magazine, the school's highest ranking ever in the magazine's biannual rankings, and was listed as a top 500 high school by Newsweek.

Our Lady of the Magnificat School, a Catholic school that had been operated since 1964 under the auspices of the Roman Catholic Diocese of Paterson, closed after the 2009–10 school year in the face of declining enrollment and increasing deficits that the parish could no longer sustain.

== Transportation ==
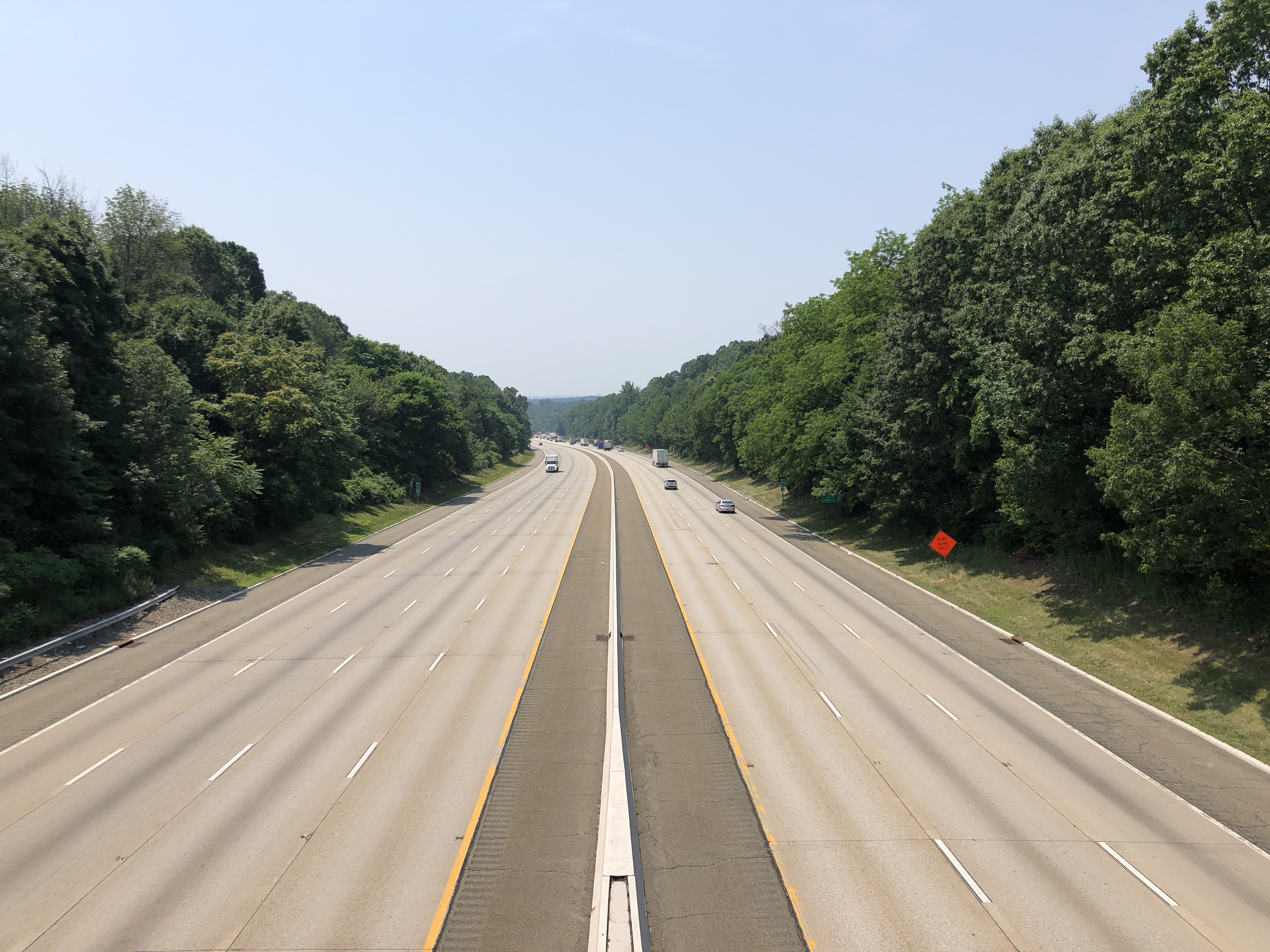
I-287 southbound in Kinnelon

=== Roads and highways ===
As of May 2010, the borough had a total of 54.41 miles (87.56 km) of roadways, of which 44.94 miles (72.32 km) were maintained by the municipality, 7.42 miles (11.94 km) by Morris County and 2.05 miles (3.30 km) by the New Jersey Department of Transportation.

Route 23 runs along the northern border of the borough. Interstate 287 passes through in the southeastern area, but the closest exit is along Route 23 in neighboring Riverdale.

=== Public transportation ===
NJ Transit provides bus service to the Port Authority Bus Terminal in Midtown Manhattan on the 194 route.

== Notable people ==
People who were born in, residents of, or otherwise closely associated with Kinnelon include:

- Juan Agudelo (born 1992), soccer player for the New England Revolution in Major League Soccer
- Scott Allen (born 1949), retired figure skater who was the 1964 Olympic bronze medalist, the 1965 world silver medalist, and the 1964 and 1966 U.S. national champion
- Kurt Allerman (born 1955), former NFL football player
- Rand Araskog (1931–2021), manufacturing executive, investor, and writer who served as the CEO of ITT Corporation
- Laura Benanti (born 1979), musical theatre actress who has appeared in numerous Broadway theatre productions
- Missy Elliott (born 1971), rapper, singer, songwriter, record producer, dancer, and philanthropist
- DJ Envy (born 1977), DJ who works on the syndicated radio show The Breakfast Club on Power 105.1
- Herbert O. Fisher (1909–1990), test pilot and aviation executive
- Ray Forrest (1916–1999), pioneering TV announcer, host and news broadcaster from the earliest era of television
- Bryan Gallego (born 1993), professional soccer player
- Oz Griebel (1949–2020), banker, lawyer, and political candidate who ran for Governor of Connecticut as a third-party candidate and earned 3.9% of the vote
- Erik Hanson (born 1965), former Major League baseball pitcher
- Brett Hearn (born 1958), modified stock car driver
- Ian Joyce (born 1985), professional soccer player who played for the Major League Soccer club Colorado Rapids
- Rene Joyeuse (1920-2012), World War II operative, spy and saboteur with the OSS, who was a physician, professor and researcher, co-founder of the American Trauma Society and the first person born in Switzerland to be honored with a burial in Arlington National Cemetery
- Stearns Matthews (born 1984), cabaret singer, recording artist, director, teacher, and pianist
- Roman Oben (born 1972), former NFL football player
- William A. Pailes (born 1952), astronaut who flew as a payload specialist aboard STS-51-J on the Space Shuttle Atlantis
- Elise Testone (born 1983), singer and American Idol contestant
- Harry L. Towe (1898–1977), Congressman who represented New Jersey's 9th congressional district from 1943 to 1951
