= Bryan Gallego =

American soccer player

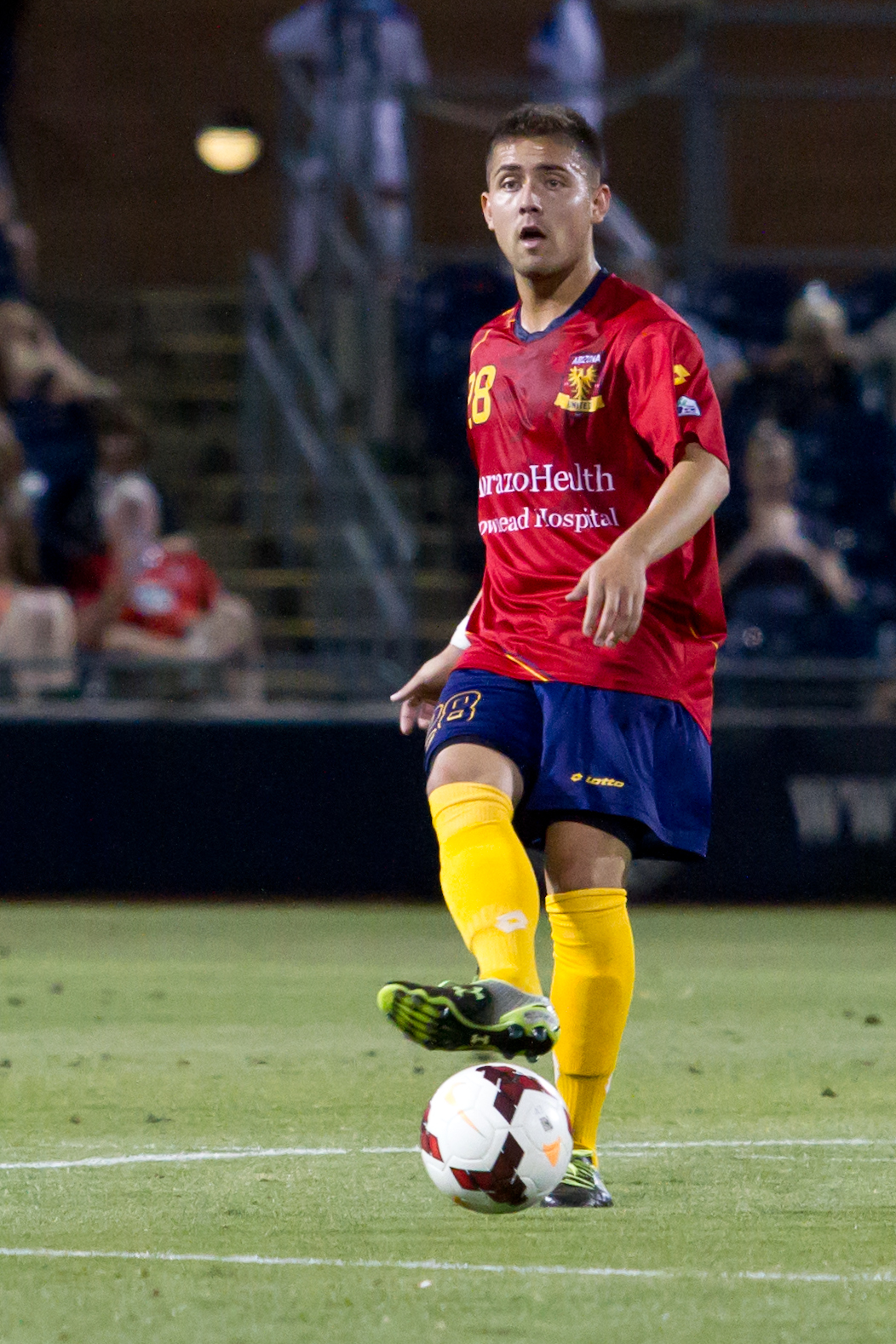
- Gallego playing for Arizona United SC

Personal information
- Date of birth: March 10, 1993 (age 33)
- Place of birth: Kinnelon, New Jersey, U.S.
- Height: 1.76 m (5 ft 9 in)
- Position: Defender

Youth career
- 2007–2011: New York Red Bulls

College career
Years	Team	Apps	(Gls)
2011–2013	Akron Zips		

Senior career*
Years	Team	Apps	(Gls)
2012	Michigan Bucks	1	(0)
2013	Portland Timbers U23s	10	(0)
2014	Portland Timbers	0	(0)
2014	→ Sacramento Republic FC (loan)	0	(0)
2014	→ Arizona United (loan)	6	(0)

International career^{‡}
2010–2011	United States U18	8	(0)
2010	United States U20	1	(0)
2014	United States U23	1	(0)
- * Club domestic league appearances and goals as of December 13, 2014 ‡ National team caps and goals as of August 16, 2014

Bryan Gallego (born March 10, 1993) is an American former soccer player.

== Career ==
=== Youth, college and amateur ===
Gallego grew up in Kinnelon, New Jersey and graduated from Kinnelon High School as part of the class of 2011. He spent his youth career with the New York Red Bulls Academy. However, on December 3, 2012, the Portland Timbers acquired the MLS Homegrown rights for Gallego in a trade that sent Kosuke Kimura to the New York Red Bulls.

Following his time in the Red Bulls youth system, Gallego spent three seasons at the University of Akron. In 2011, he started all 22 games he appeared in and was named College Soccer News Freshman All-American, All-MAC Second Team and All-Ohio team. In 2012, he started all 22 games and finished the year with a goal and an assist on his way to being named All-MAC Second Team for the second straight year. In 2013, he appeared in 20 games and helped the Zips record nine shutouts and hold opponents to one or fewer goals in 19 of 22 games. He went on to be named NSCAA All-America Second Team, All-Great Lakes Region First Team and All-MAC First team.

During his time in college, Gallego also played in the USL Premier Development League for Michigan Bucks and Portland Timbers U23s.

=== Professional ===
On January 15, 2014, Gallego signed a homegrown contract with MLS club Portland Timbers, making him the third homegrown signing in club history. A month later, he was loaned to USL Pro affiliate club Sacramento Republic FC. However, he was recalled by the Timbers after not making an appearance for the club and loaned out to Arizona United SC on April 24. He made his professional debut the following day in a 1–1 draw with LA Galaxy II.
