= Frank C. Osmers Jr. =

American politician

Frank Charles Osmers Jr.
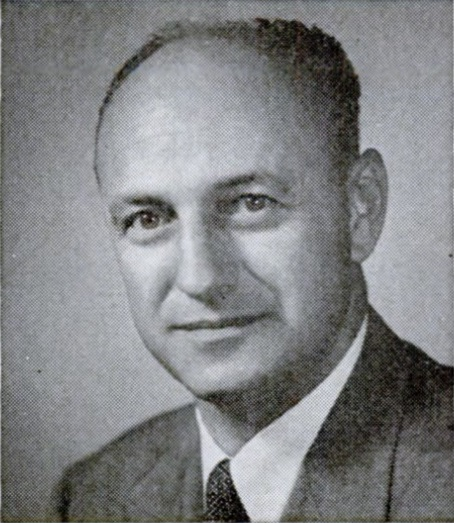
- From 1953's Pocket Congressional Directory of the Eighty-Third Congress

Member of the U.S. House of Representatives from New Jersey's 9th district
- In office November 6, 1951 – January 3, 1965
- Preceded by: Harry L. Towe
- Succeeded by: Henry Helstoski
- In office January 3, 1939 – January 3, 1943
- Preceded by: Edward Aloysius Kenney
- Succeeded by: Harry L. Towe

Member of the New Jersey General Assembly
- In office 1935–1937

Personal details
- Born: December 30, 1907 Leonia, New Jersey, US
- Died: May 21, 1977 (aged 69) Tenafly, New Jersey, US
- Party: Republican

Frank Charles Osmers Jr. (December 30, 1907 – May 21, 1977) was an American Republican Party politician who represented New Jersey's 9th congressional district in the United States House of Representatives from 1939 to 1943 and again from 1951 to 1965.

== Biography ==
He was born in Leonia, New Jersey, on December 30, 1907. Raised in Haworth, New Jersey, Osmers attended the local public schools, graduating from Dumont High School before attending Williams College, in Williamstown, Massachusetts. He was engaged in the jewelry business.

Osmers was a member of the Haworth Borough Council from 1930 to 1934 and served as Mayor of Haworth, New Jersey in 1935 and 1936. He was a member of the New Jersey General Assembly from 1935 to 1937, and was elected as a Republican to the Seventy-sixth and to the Seventy-seventh Congress, serving in office from January 3, 1939 – January 3, 1943.

While a member of the Seventy-seventh Congress, Osmers enlisted as a private and graduated from the Infantry School at Fort Benning, Georgia, as a second lieutenant. He was placed on the inactive list by Presidential directive and finished his term in Congress, but was not a candidate for reelection in 1942 to the Seventy-eighth Congress.

Osmers went on active duty as a second lieutenant in the Seventy-seventh Infantry Division on January 4, 1943, transferred to the Twenty-fourth Corps and served in the Pacific, and was discharged on February 22, 1946. He served as a major in Officers’ Reserve Corps.

After he returned from his military service, Osmers resumed his former business pursuits and was also interested in real estate, insurance, and publishing businesses. He was elected as a Republican to the Eighty-second Congress, by special election on November 6, 1951, to fill the vacancy caused by the resignation of Harry L. Towe, and was reelected to the six succeeding Congresses, serving from November 6, 1951, to January 3, 1965. Osmers voted in favor of the Civil Rights Acts of 1957, 1960, and 1964, and the 24th Amendment to the U.S. Constitution. He was an unsuccessful candidate for reelection in 1964 to the Eighty-ninth Congress, and was again unsuccessful in his bid for office in 1966 to the Ninetieth Congress, both times losing to Democrat Henry Helstoski by 51% to 49% margins.

He was executive administrator, Bergen County, New Jersey from 1968 to 1970 and engaged in a real estate business in Englewood, New Jersey.

He resided in Tenafly, New Jersey, where he died on May 21, 1977, and was interred in Brookside Cemetery in Englewood, New Jersey.

U.S. House of Representatives
Preceded by Edward Aloysius Kenney	Member of the U.S. House of Representatives from New Jersey's 9th congressional district January 3, 1939 – January 3, 1943	Succeeded by Harry L. Towe
Preceded by Harry L. Towe	Member of the U.S. House of Representatives from New Jersey's 9th congressional district November 6, 1951 – January 3, 1965	Succeeded by Henry Helstoski
