= Oz Griebel =

American politician

- Born: Richard Nelson Griebel; June 21, 1949; Camden, New Jersey, U.S.
- Died: July 29, 2020 (aged 71); Pennsylvania, U.S.
- Education: Dartmouth College; Suffolk University
- Occupations: Banker; lawyer; political candidate
- Political party: Independent (2017–2020); Republican (before 2017)
- Children: 3

Richard Nelson "Oz" Griebel (June 21, 1949 – July 29, 2020) was an American banker, lawyer, and political candidate. He ran as a Republican primary candidate in the 2010 Connecticut gubernatorial election, and as an independent in the 2018 gubernatorial election.

== Early life and education ==
Richard Nelson Griebel was born in Camden, New Jersey. Raised in the Smoke Rise section of Kinnelon, New Jersey, he had moderate success as a pitcher on the Kinnelon High School baseball team.

His nickname, "Oz", was a reference to his middle name being the same as the surname of the Nelson family on The Adventures of Ozzie and Harriet. Griebel graduated in 1971 with a Bachelor of Arts in English from Dartmouth College, where he played baseball and football for the Dartmouth Big Green. In 1970, he played collegiate summer baseball for the Harwich Mariners of the Cape Cod Baseball League, establishing a league record for innings pitched in a season with 110. Griebel also earned a Juris Doctor from Suffolk University in 1977. The Dartmouth baseball team represented New England in the 1970 College World Series.

== Professional ==
Griebel was a teacher and coach at Worcester Academy. He served as CEO at BankBoston Connecticut from 1993 to 1999. Beginning in 2001, Griebel served as president and CEO of the MetroHartford Alliance, leading the economic development efforts of the Hartford region. Griebel sat on the corporate boards of MacDermid, Inc., Tallan, Inc., and World Business Capital. Griebel was named by the Hartford Courant and Hartford Business Journal as "Business Person of the Year" in 1995 and 2001, respectively.

== Political career ==
Griebel announced his candidacy for Governor of Connecticut on January 28, 2010. After declaring his candidacy, Griebel met with thousands of Republican activists and participated in several debates and forums. Some of Griebel's opponents had focused on the fact that as a Republican candidate, he had made numerous donations to Democratic politicians, and as a result of this, his legitimacy as a Republican candidate for governor had been under scrutiny. His campaign's first television commercial began airing on April 23, 2010. In the Republican primary, held on August 10, 2010, Griebel lost the gubernatorial nomination to former ambassador to Ireland Tom Foley.

On December 21, 2017, Griebel announced that he would make an independent run for governor in 2018, along with his running mate Monte Frank, an attorney from Newtown, Connecticut. Griebel, at that juncture a former Republican was registered as Unaffiliated. Frank a former Democrat was registered as Unaffiliated. In the general election he placed in third behind Republican nominee Bob Stefanowski and winner Ned Lamont, the Democratic nominee. Griebel earned 3.89% of the vote and had been called a spoiler candidate for Stefanowski who lost narrowly to Lamont.

Connecticut's gubernatorial election, 2018
Party	Candidate	Votes	%	±%
Democratic	Ned Lamont	694,510	49.37%	−1.36%
Republican	Bob Stefanowski	650,138	46.21%	−1.95%
Griebel Frank for CT	Oz Griebel	54,741	3.89%	N/A
Libertarian	Rod Hanscomb	6,086	0.43%	N/A
Amigo Constitution Liberty	Mark Greenstein	1,254	0.09%	N/A
Write-in	Lee Whitnum (write-in)	74	0.01%	N/A
Total votes		1,406,803	100.0%	N/A
Democratic hold				

== Civic participation ==
Griebel served on the boards of the Annual Fund of the United Way of the Central Naugatuck Valley, Bradley International Airport, the Connecticut Business and Industry Association, the Connecticut Transportation Strategy Board, Junior Achievement of Central Connecticut, the Mark Twain House, Northwest Catholic High School, Riverfront Recapture, the University of Hartford, the Wadsworth Atheneum, the Waterbury Foundation, and Yale-New Haven Hospital.

== Personal life ==
Griebel resided in Hartford and had three children.

On July 21, 2020, Griebel was hit by a motorist while jogging in Pennsylvania. He died from complications of his injuries on July 29.
