= The ITT Wars =

The ITT Wars: An Insider's View of Hostile Takeovers
- Softcover edition
- Author: Rand Araskog
- Language: English
- Subject: History of ITT Corporation
- Genre: Non-fiction
- Publisher: Henry Holt & Co.
- Publication date: 1989
- Publication place: United States
- Media type: Print
- Pages: 241 pp.
- ISBN: 978-1893122383

The ITT Wars: An Insider's View of Hostile Takeovers is a non-fiction book about ITT Corporation written by its CEO Rand Araskog. The book was published by Henry Holt & Co. in 1989.

== Contents ==
The book chronicles a hostile takeover attempt by Jay Pritzker to get control over the corporation.

== Review ==
The book as a whole is a self-serving account of fighting takeover and board-room battles and taking on the French bureaucracy in a joint venture involving ITT`s telecommunications operations in Europe. It is written in a breezy, first-person style, a la Iacocca, that attempts to bring the reader close to the world of business negotiation and intrigue. There also is an interesting account, skimpy in detail, of how Araskog succeeded in persuading former Defense Secretary Caspar Weinberger not to deny classified information to an ITT German subsidiary, Standard Eletrik Lorenz. A Soviet defector had identified the firm as a source of leaks, but Araskog said the information was false. Weinberger was ready to make the ITT firm an example, but backed off when his aide, Richard Perle, launched a probe that supported ITT.

—Review by Chicago Tribune

== See also ==
- Holding company
- List of conglomerates
- Media conglomerate
