= Tripod Rock =

Balancing boulder in Kinnelon, New Jersey

Coordinates: 40.9613°N 74.385°W

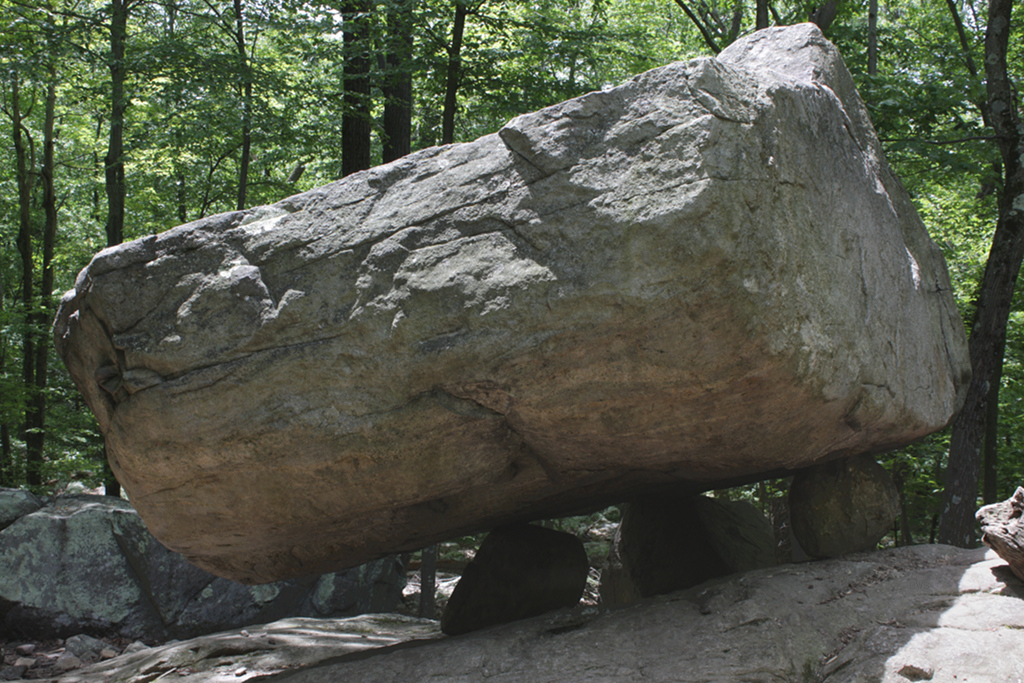
Tripod Rock from the east (video)

3D model of Tripod Rock produced via photogrammetry

Tripod Rock is a glacial erratic, in this specific case a balancing rock, or perched boulder, located in Kinnelon, New Jersey in the Pyramid Mountain Natural Historic Area. This multi-ton Precambrian gneiss boulder, located near the edge of a long ridge, is balanced on three smaller boulders. Tripod Rock is roughly 6 m (20 ft) long, 3 m (9.8 ft) wide, and 2.5 m (8 ft 2 in) high, weighing approximately 127 tonnes (280,000 lb). A triangular crest runs the length of its top. The boulder is balanced on three smaller stones roughly 1 m (3 ft 3 in) in diameter that raise it above the bedrock by about 0.5 m (1 ft 8 in) at its lowest point. The point of contact between the boulder and its support stones forms an approximate 3-4-5 triangle.

About 12 m (39 ft) northwest of Tripod Rock are three other boulders comprising a triangle. The two larger boulders are partially balanced on smaller stones (see diagram). The apex rock is about 3 m (9.8 ft) to the northeast. Two smaller perched boulders are located northeast of Tripod Rock (not shown on diagram) measuring approximately 1–3 m (3 ft 3 in – 9 ft 10 in) in diameter. No specific calendar alignment has been noted. Tripod Rock stands on a ridge overlooking a long valley where a massive glacial erratic named Bear Rock is located near a brook. Bear Rock was thoroughly excavated for archaeological artifacts during the 19th century, some of which are reported to be owned by museums. Bear Rock has a large overhang making it a possible rock shelter.

== See also ==
- List of individual rocks
