= Riverdale School District (New Jersey) =

School district in Morris County, New Jersey, US

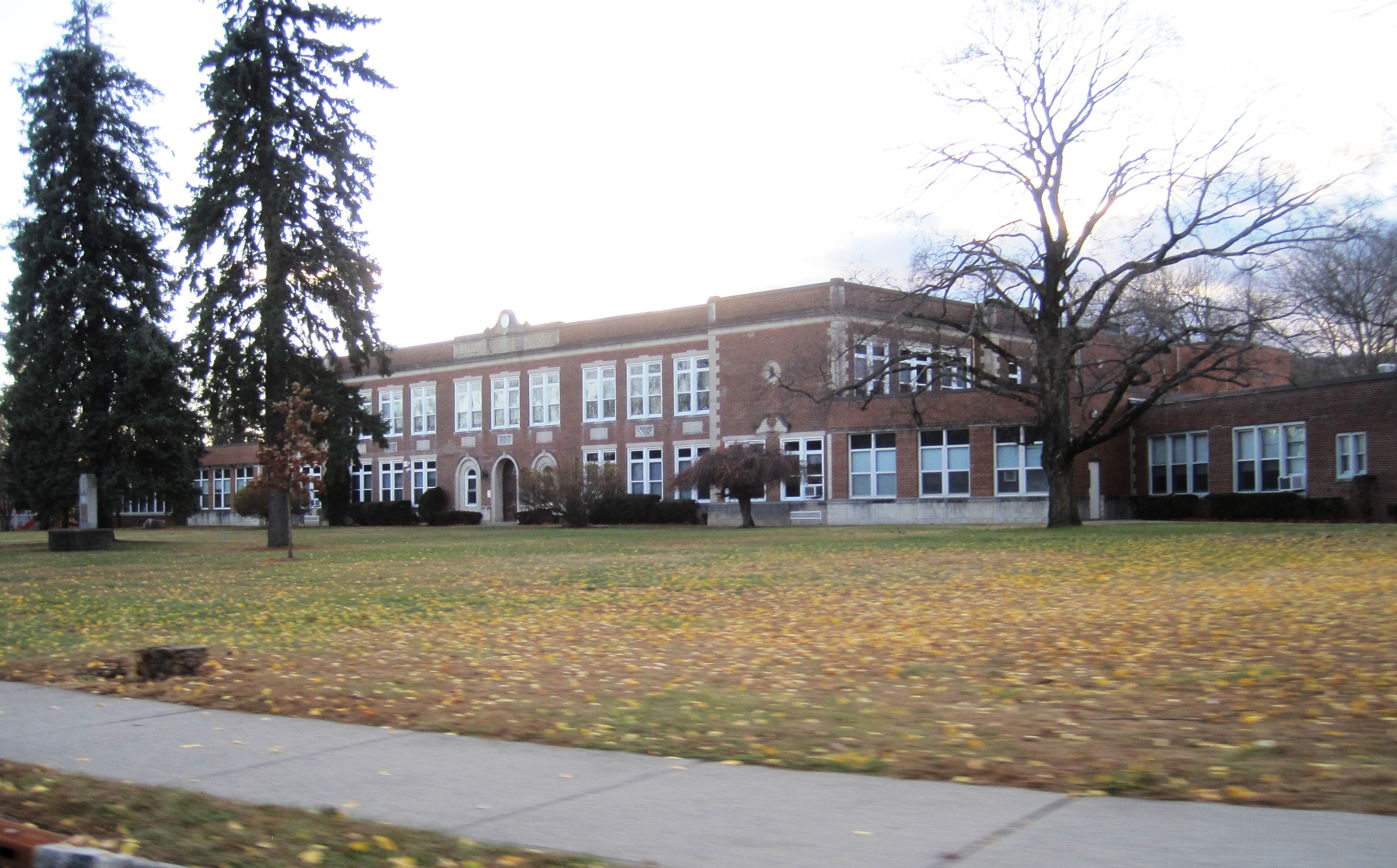
- Riverdale Public School, the only school in the district

Address
- 52 Newark-Pompton Turnpike Riverdale, Morris County, New Jersey, 07457; United States
- Coordinates: 40.992713°N 74.303223°W

District information
- Grades: PreK-8
- Superintendent: Jayson Gutierrez
- Business administrator: Scott Bisig
- Schools: 1

Students and staff
- Enrollment: 274 (as of 2024–25)
- Faculty: 32.0 FTEs
- Student–teacher ratio: 8.6:1

Other information
- District Factor Group: FG
- Website: www.rpsnj.org
Ind.	Per pupil	District spending	Rank (*)	K-8 average	%± vs. average
1A	Total Spending	$17,630	25	$18,891	−6.7%
1	Budgetary Cost	10,691	5	14,159	−24.5%
2	Classroom Instruction	5,975	2	8,659	−31.0%
6	Support Services	1,826	18	2,167	−15.7%
8	Administrative Cost	1,603	34	1,547	3.6%
10	Operations & Maintenance	1,137	6	1,612	−29.5%
13	Extracurricular Activities	137	35	104	31.7%
16	Median Teacher Salary	54,035	19	61,136
Data from NJDoE 2014 Taxpayers' Guide to Education Spending. *Of K-8 districts with up to 360 students. Lowest spending=1; Highest=71

The Riverdale School District is a community public school district that serves students in pre-kindergarten through eighth grade from Riverdale, in Morris County, in the U.S. state of New Jersey.

As of the 2024–25 school year, the district, comprised of one school, had an enrollment of 274 students and 32.0 classroom teachers (on an FTE basis), for a student–teacher ratio of 8.6:1.

Public school students in ninth through twelfth grades attend Pompton Lakes High School in Pompton Lakes, as part of a sending/receiving relationship with the Pompton Lakes School District. As of the 2024–25 school year, the high school had an enrollment of 610 students and 52.3 classroom teachers (on an FTE basis), for a student–teacher ratio of 11.7:1.

== History ==
With the planned opening of Kinnelon High School, the Riverdale School District obtained state approval in August 1960 to shift its students out of Butler High School to attend school in Kinnelon for grades 7-12.

Riverdale began their efforts to end their sending/receiving relationship with the Kinnelon Public Schools as early as 1975, and formally ended it in 1991, when they started sending their high school students to Pompton Lakes High School for financial reasons and proximity.

The district had been classified by the New Jersey Department of Education as being in District Factor Group "FG", the fourth-highest of eight groupings. District Factor Groups organize districts statewide to allow comparison by common socioeconomic characteristics of the local districts. From lowest socioeconomic status to highest, the categories are A, B, CD, DE, FG, GH, I and J.

== School ==
Riverdale Public School had an enrollment of 273 students in grades PreK–8 as of the 2024–25 school year.

- Mark Sernatinger, principal

== Administration ==
Core members of the district's administration are:

- Jayson Gutierrez, superintendent of schools
- Scott Bisig, business administrator and board secretary

== Board of education ==
The district's board of education, comprised of seven members, sets policy and oversees the fiscal and educational operation of the district through its administration. As a Type II school district, the board's trustees are elected directly by voters to serve three-year terms of office on a staggered basis, with either two or three seats up for election each year held (since 2017) as part of the November general election. The board appoints a superintendent to oversee the district's day-to-day operations and a business administrator to supervise the business functions of the district.
