= Herbert O. Fisher =

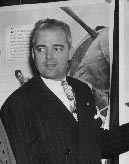
- Herbert O. Fisher, c. 1944
- Born: Herbert Owen Fisher; March 6, 1909; Tonawanda, New York, US
- Died: July 29, 1990 (aged 81); Chilton Memorial Hospital, Kinnelon, New Jersey, US
- Known for: Test pilot, Administrator
- Spouse: Emily Fisher (née Yucknat)
- Children: 1
- Awards: Air Medal
- Aviation career
- Air force: United States Army Air Corps
- Battles: World War II

Herbert O. Fisher (March 6, 1909 – July 29, 1990) was an American test pilot and aviation executive, overseeing aviation projects at the Port Authority of New York and New Jersey. He worked for the Curtiss-Wright Corporation. Fisher flew as a pilot for over 50 years, racking up 19,351 accident and violation free hours.

During World War II Fisher was sent to the China-Burma-India theater to train the Flying Tigers as a civilian. He flew many combat missions and was awarded the Air Medal by Franklin D. Roosevelt.

Disproving the public perception of the heroic test pilot, among his peers, the portly Fisher was considered one of the premiere pilots of his time. "Herbert O. Fisher is one of those people who generally went unnoticed. That is until he climbed into the cockpit of an airplane."

== Early years ==
Fisher was born on March 6, 1909, at Tonawanda, New York, to Harold O. Fisher and Emma Rose Fisher (née Wortley). At the age of 16, he had his first flying experience at the hands of a barnstormer, and was "hooked" on flying. After completing two years at college, Fisher began to explore aviation as a career.

== Aviation career ==
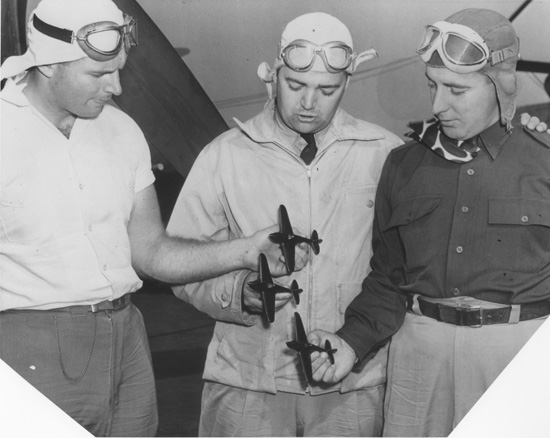
Curtiss test pilots, Fisher in center, c. 1940

Fisher's aviation career began with his signing up with the United States Army Air Corps in 1927, becoming a member of the 309 Observation Reserve Squadron, Schoen Field, Fort Benjamin Harrison, Indiana. He began flight training in 1928. (Note: In 1931, 309 Observation Reserve Squadron consisted of 18 National Guard personnel and 10 aircraft.) In 1931, as the Secretary for the Aviation Committee of the Indianapolis Chamber of Commerce, Fisher was actively involved in the aviation interests in the area, including the operation of the municipal airport.

=== Curtiss-Wright ===
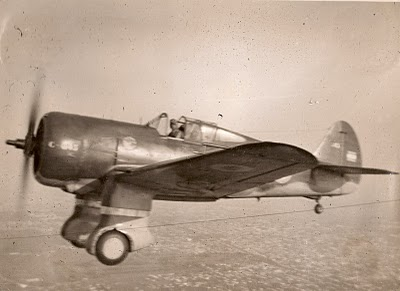
Curtiss Hawk 75-O, developed for Argentine Army Aviation, as an export Hawk 75 variant.

After leaving the military in 1933, Fisher joined Curtiss-Wright, and was assigned to test pilot duties. In checking out aircraft off the production lines at the Buffalo, New York, plant, on his first day, he flew 10 aircraft. (Note: The standard procedure for an acceptance flight was a one-hour check of all major systems. Fisher had a specialty, he would take an aircraft up to "20,000, strain the engine upward, then go inverted, throttle full forward, and nose it over, losing 10,000 feet or more at 500mph+. He knew it was almost impossible to tear a P-40 apart in a dive, which was a HUGE advantage over the Zero. He knew the operating parameters of that airplane and almost every rivet.") During his 15 years with Curtiss-Wright as Chief Production Test Pilot, Fisher recorded thousands of test flight hours in the Curtiss C-46 Commando, Curtiss P-36/Model 75 Hawk, Curtiss SB2C Helldivers, Curtiss P-40 Warhawks and Republic P-47 Thunderbolt fighters. (Note: During World War II, along with its own transports, dive bombers, trainers, seaplanes and fighters, Curtiss-Wright manufactured 354 P-47Gs at its Buffalo, New York, plant.) He flew 2,498 P-40s in his role as a production test pilot. (Note: In 1976, Fisher flew a P-40 again to make it an even 2,500 flights in the type.)

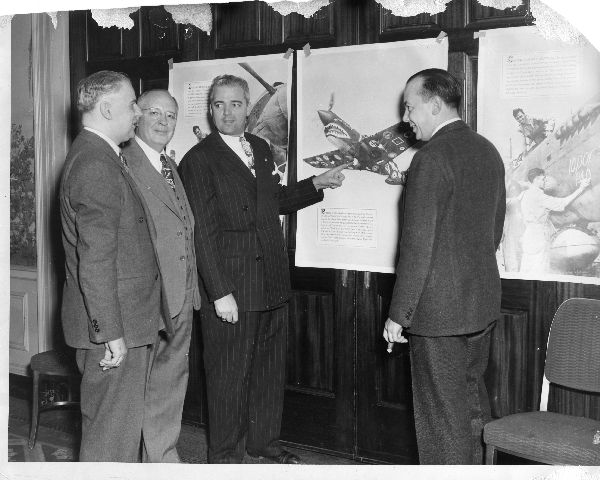
Curtiss company executives, with Fisher (at center), indicating the highly decorated P-40N, (Note: The Curtiss P-40N, representing the 15,000th Curtiss fighter built, was emblazoned with the insignia of all 28 air forces with which Curtiss fighters had served during World War II.) the firm's 15,000th fighter, November 1944.

In 1942, due to wartime priorities that prohibited the use of military aircraft for Hollywood productions, Republic Studios approached Curtiss-Wright in Buffalo to recreate the aerial battle sequences required for Flying Tigers, starring John Wayne. A number of P-40E fighter aircraft waiting for USAAC delivery were repainted in AVG markings, and with the aid of Curtiss test pilots, flew in the film. Fisher's screen role was in subbing for John Wayne.

At the request of the commander of the Flying Tigers, Claire Chennault, Chief Engineer Don R. Berlin sent Fisher abroad as the best way to have "imparted his experience on those courageous young fellows over there with knowledge they could not possibility have". During 13 months overseas from 1943 on, despite his being a civilian test pilot, while in the China-Burma-India (CBI) theater, Fisher flew as many as 50 missions to prove the P-40 under combat conditions. He also lectured and conducted P-40 flight demonstrations in almost every fighter base in the CBI, Middle East, North and Central Africa.

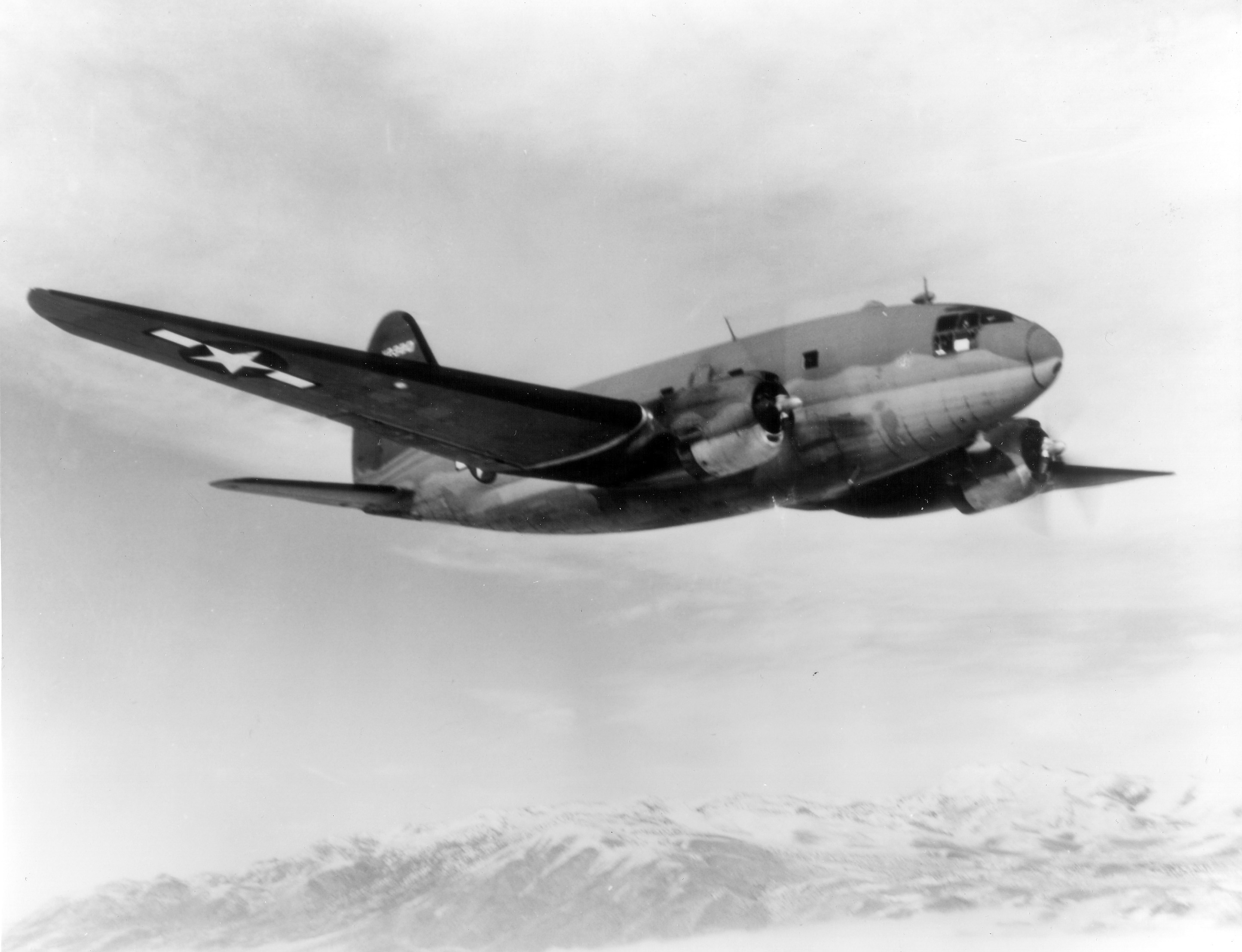
Curtiss C-46 Commando

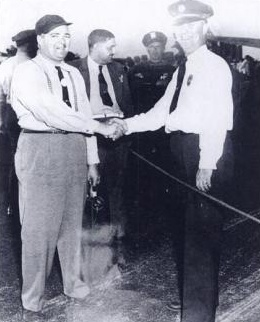
Fisher with Curtiss-Wright Fire Chief John L. Ward, note Caldwell in background, August 6, 1942.

Fisher was also instrumental in supporting the introduction of the Curtiss C-46 at the Engineering and Operation section of the Air Transport Command. On August 6, 1942, first-hand experience with a faulty landing gear on an early production C-46, led to an example of his coolness in critical situations. While on an acceptance re-flight, the aircraft was loaded with Curtiss executives, and a special guest, fresh from combat in North Africa, Australian P-40 ace, Group Captain Clive "Killer" Caldwell. With the landing gear stuck in a three-quarters down position, and after an extended eight-hour attempt to release the gear, Fisher calmly belly-landed the C-46. With the weight of the aircraft gently pushing the gear back into the wheel wells, a minimum of damage resulted. Caldwell had taken over as the co-pilot on the eight hours of circling over Buffalo, receiving certification that he was checked out on the C-46, under the tutelage of Fisher. Recognizing that the new transport was subject to teething problems common to any new type, Fisher was able to assist operational units in the technique of flying and maintaining C-46 transports. He would eventually fly 96 "research missions" over "The Hump" as a means of testing all the critical systems and troubleshooting a dangerous tendency for the engine fires and explosions that had plagued the C-46. CBI C-46 pilot Don Downie recalled, "Herb Fisher's detailed reports were some of the best pilot briefings we had."

Through his hard work and persistence, Fisher also convinced American General Joseph Stilwell, the Vice Commander of the CBI theater, that the new operational procedures would save the lives of hundreds of pilots and passengers. In 1944, at a special ceremony in Washington, D.C., President Franklin D. Roosevelt awarded the Air Medal to Fisher in recognition of his service; he was the first living civilian to receive the honor.

== Postwar ==
At the end of World War II, Fisher transferred to the Propeller Division of Curtiss-Wright, in Caldwell, New Jersey, where he served as the Chief Pilot. One of his important assignments was to assess the full potential of propeller-driven aircraft.

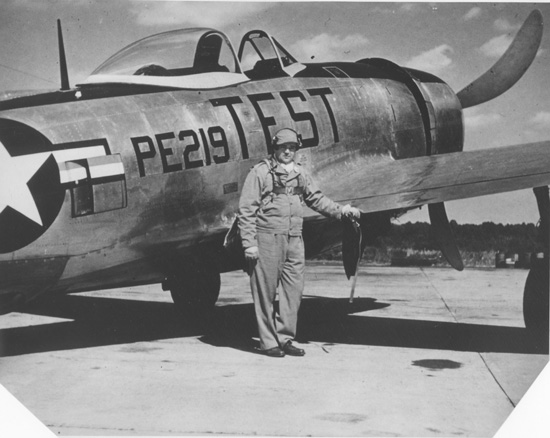
Fisher with USAAF P-47D-30-RE "Test PE-219" in postwar testing; note scimitar propeller.

=== Compressibility effects ===
After test flights of a P-47C on November 13, 1942, Republic Aviation issued a press release on December 1, 1942, claiming that Lts. Harold E. Comstock and fellow test pilot Roger Dyar had exceeded the speed of sound. In response, Fisher later observed, "We knew about Mach 1 going clear back to the P-36 and the P-40 ... Nothing could go 600 mph (970 km/h) mph in level flight, but pilots were beginning to dive fighters. We ran into compressibility back in '38."

The desire to develop a propeller that maintained its efficiency at transonic and supersonic speeds led the Curtiss-Wright Propeller Division to design and test several different concepts, including a thin, cuffed four-blade and a three-bladed "scimitar" design. Utilizing a specially modified P-47D-30-RE on loan from the USAAF, (Note: P-47D-30-RE (44-90219) was marked as "Test PE-219".) Fisher undertook over 100 high Mach number precision dives from 38,000 ft (11,582 m) at speeds from 500 mph (800 km/h) to 590 mph (950 km/h). (Note: In a bit of grim humor, British test pilot Eric Brown said diving the P-47 at anything over Mach 0.74 was called "The Graveyard Dive".) The typical flight began above 35,000 ft (10,668 m) when Fisher would push over into a steep dive, allowing his airspeed to build beyond 560 mph (900 km/h) (true airspeed). He would then execute a pullout at 18,000 ft (5,486 m), having to maintain an exacting set altitude within plus or minus five ft.

Some of the tests proved hazardous with flexing of the thin blades on the ground run-ups. Test flights also had to be carefully flown as engine power could only be fed in gradually for the same reason. The most serious incident, though one unconnected with compressibility, occurred in August 1948 when a rupture of a high pressure oil line at 590 mph (950 km/h) mph over Allentown, Pennsylvania, led to an emergency "blind" landing with the entire aircraft coated in black oil. Several of these dives resulted in speeds of Mach 0.83; one on 27 October 1949 reached the fastest speed a P-47 could attain.

During the test program, Fisher brought his son, Herbert O. Fisher, Jr., along for a Mach 0.80 dive. The youngster was touted as "the world's fastest toddler".

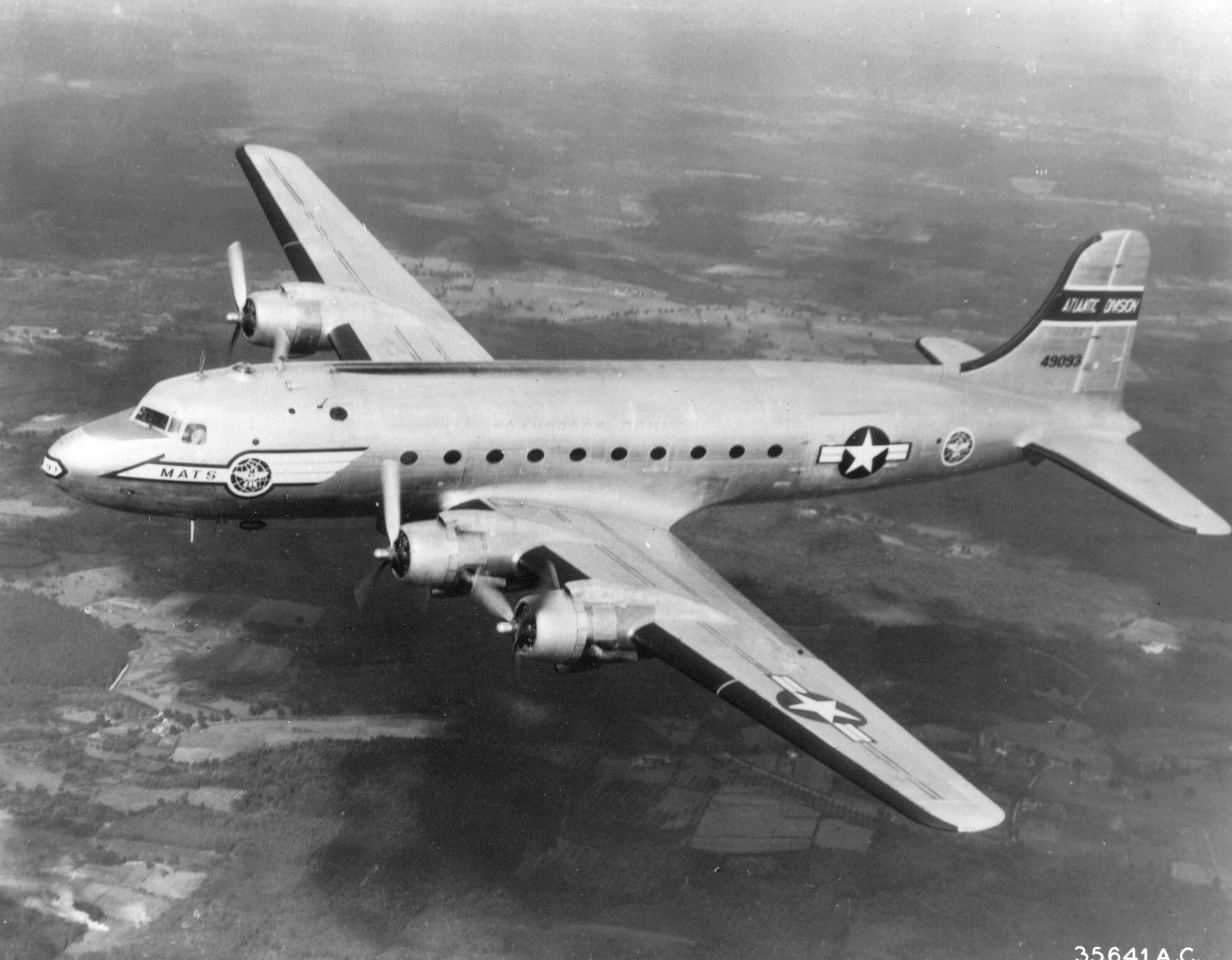
Douglas C-54 Skymaster

=== Reversible pitch experiments ===
Fisher also conducted a program designed to allow aircraft to descend rapidly. It involved reversing all four propellers simultaneously in flight. On a Douglas C-54 Skymaster transport, the extremely high sink rates of up to 15,000 feet per minute in four seconds after reversal, produced a safe method of rapid descent for airliners. The flight would start at 15,000 ft., three miles from the airfield before push over, landing and coming to a full stop in one minute and 50 seconds. Fisher wrote that forward airspeed was well within normal parameters (200 mph (320 km/h)), with no decrease in controllability.

Fisher conducted nearly 200 of these high rate/low speed descents and demonstrated the technique for Generals"Hap" Arnold and Dwight Eisenhower in 1948. For the latest pressurized airliners and combat aircraft that operated at high altitudes, this was an effective method of safely dumping altitude in the event of an emergency, and was adopted worldwide as a safe procedure. Fisher was also instrumental in developing the use of reversing pitch to rapidly slow an aircraft, which allowed them to land safely on shorter runways, and, in general, greatly reduce the incidence of runway overruns.

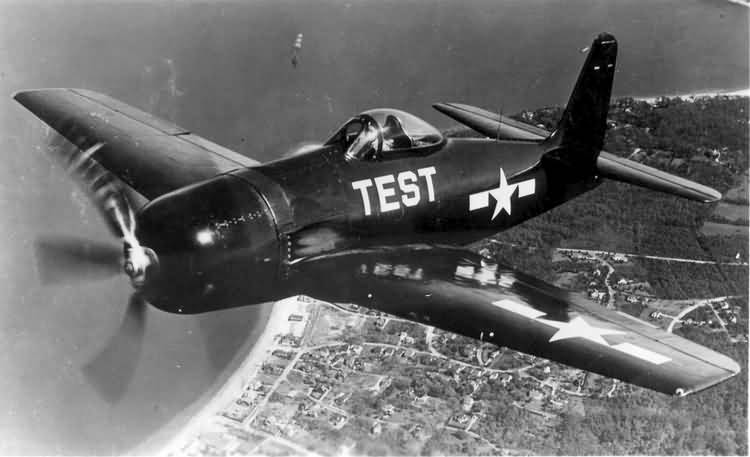
Grumman F8F Bearcat

Later, flying a U.S. Navy Grumman F8F Bearcat fighter, Fisher developed a way to fly "zero-g", vertical dives. From 20,000 ft, the F8F would be nosed down into a vertical dive, while he simultaneously reversed the propeller pitch. This technique allowed a controlled vertical dive at rates of descent that varied between 30,000 and 37,000 fpm.

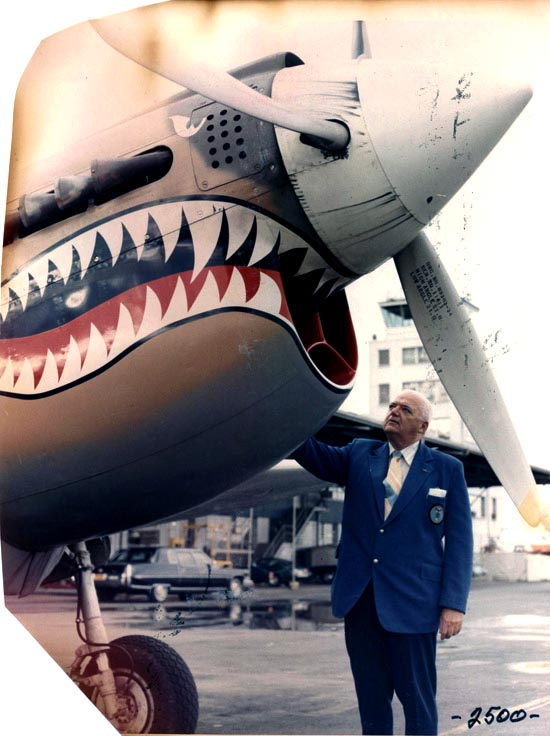
Fisher with the P-40 in which he had his 2,500th flight in the type, c. 1976.

== Later career and associations ==
After leaving Curtiss-Wright in 1952, Fisher worked for 23 years as a Special Assistant for Aviation to Executive Director Austin Joseph Tobin at the Port Authority of New York and New Jersey. As head of aviation-industry affairs, his work included evaluating requests for fixed-wing and rotary aircraft to use airports in the New York metropolitan region. The airports he supervised included John F. Kennedy, LaGuardia, Newark and Teterboro. During his tenure, Fisher checked out numerous aircraft from wide-body airliners to the executive jets. (Note: During his administration, the one aircraft that was not cleared for use in the New York area was the Aérospatiale-BAC Concorde. Fisher was instrumental, however, in setting up the approach corridor for the Concorde that would later be used when the supersonic airliner began regular service to JFK in 1977.) He retired in 1975, but continued to be active in aviation and other interests. Over the years, in his role as Special Assistant at the Port Authority of New York and New Jersey, Fisher had gained a reputation as a knowledgeable and skilled pilot, as well as being friendly and affable. Likewise, his dapper figure, often in well-cut clothes, led to a painting given to him on retirement, titled, "The man in the flying tuxedo," that highlighted his many connections to aviation.

Other positions Fisher filled included Director of Aeronautics for the Indianapolis Chamber of Commerce and instructor at the Embry–Riddle Aeronautical University where he held a Doctorate of Aeronautical Science (honoris causa) and was a member of their International Advisory Council. The university also has an endowment fund in his name, the Herbert O. Fisher Scholarship.

In later years, Fisher was founder and first President of the P-40 Warhawk Association, a charter member and Past President of the P-47 Thunderbolt Pilots Association, Past President of the CBI Hump Pilots Association, and Past President of the Yankee Air Force, Northeast Division. Among the many other associations in which he took an active role was as a charter member of the International Fighter Pilots Fellowship, member of the Society of Experimental Test Pilots, the Wings Club of New York and the China-Burma-India Veterans Association. In Caldwell, New Jersey, Fisher was on the New Jersey Civil Air Defense Advisory Council and also served as a councilman and police commissioner.

Fisher receiving the CBI Americanism Award, his wife Emily by his side, c. 1976.

== Awards and honors ==
In 1976, Fisher was inducted into the OX5 Aviation Pioneers Hall of Fame, at the Glenn H. Curtiss Museum in Hammondsport, New York, at the same time as Charles Lindbergh; he also received the China-Burma-India Veterans Association's Americanism Award. In the same year, Fisher was named a General "Jimmy Doolittle Educational Fellow" at the Air Force Association, with the award presented by Barry Goldwater. Joining the ranks of many famous aviators from New Jersey, in 1983, Fisher was inducted into the Aviation Hall of Fame and Museum of New Jersey. In 1984, the Yankee Air Force honoured Fisher as the "Airman of the Year" as well as inducting him in the association's Hall of Fame. On May 13, 2011, Fisher was also inducted into the Niagara Frontier Aviation & Space Hall of Fame. Accepting on behalf of his father, was Herbert O. Fisher, Jr.

== Death ==
At age 81, Fisher died on July 29, 1990, after suffering congestive heart failure. At the time of his death, he lived in the Smoke Rise gated community in Kinnelon, New Jersey, his family home since 1955.

== See also ==
- Test pilot
- Flight test
