= Scott Allen (figure skater) =

American figure skater

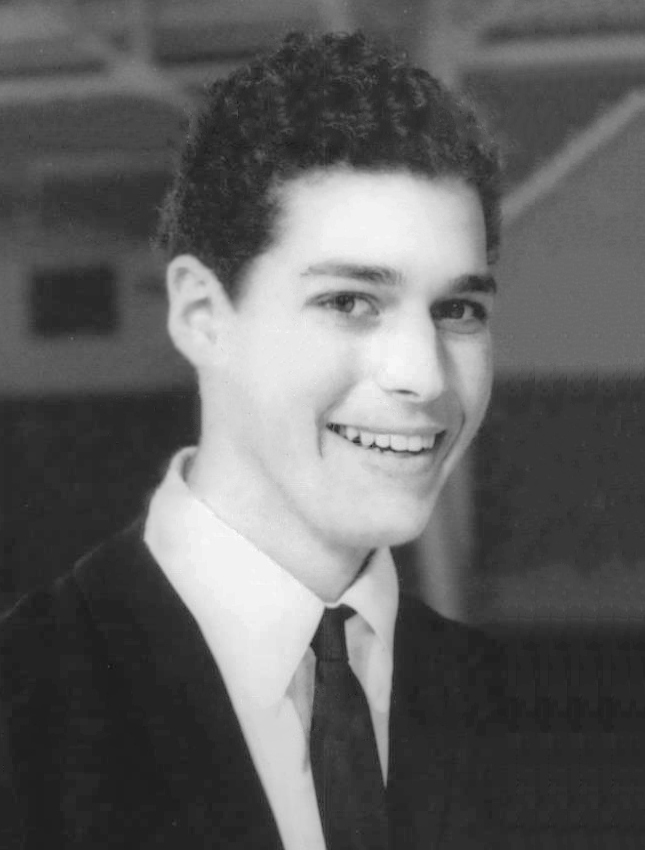
- Allen in 1966

Personal information
- Full name: Scott Ethan Allen
- Born: February 8, 1949 (age 77) Newark, New Jersey, U.S.
- Height: 5 ft 4 in (1.63 m)

Figure skating career
- Country: United States
- Discipline: Men's singles
- Skating club: Skating Club of New York
- Retired: 1968
Medal record
Olympic Games
Bronze medal – third place	1964 Innsbruck	Singles
World Championships
Silver medal – second place	1965 Colorado Springs	Singles

Scott Ethan Allen (born February 8, 1949) is a retired American figure skater. He is the 1964 Olympic bronze medalist, the 1965 world silver medalist, and the 1964 and 1966 U.S. national champion.

The son of Swedish figure skating champion Sonja Fuhrman, Allen made his national debut at the age of nine, winning the silver medal in the novice division at the 1959 U.S. Championships. At that time he was the youngest competitor ever to skate in the Championships. Raised in the Smoke Rise of Kinnelon, New Jersey, Scott attended Kinnelon High School, with tutors assisting him with his course work when he was away at competitions.

In 1961, he came second in the national championships in men's singles junior class after Monty Hoyt, just two and a half weeks before the whole national team would be killed in the Sabena Flight 548 crash while en route to the World Championships in Prague. Allen, who had only turned 12 a week earlier, had a ticket too, and was going to travel with his coach Fritz Dietl. However, Dietl, a New Jersey rink owner, had to wait for parts to arrive from the West Coast for a malfunctioning compressor; thus sparing their lives. In the post-accident vacuum, he made progress quickly at a quite young age. Already in the next year's national championship he won the silver medal just at the age of 12.

He won the bronze medal at the 1964 Winter Olympics two days before his 15th birthday, becoming the youngest medalist at the Winter Olympics. He still holds the record for the youngest male medalist and the youngest individual medalist.

He represented the Skating Club of New York in competition. After retiring from competitions Allen attended Harvard University, graduating in 1971, and then Columbia Business School. He worked for more than 30 years at his stepfather's clothing company, Corbin Ltd., eventually becoming its vice-president of research and development. As of early 2014, he resides in New York City.

== Competitive highlights ==
International
Event	1959	1960	1961	1962	1963	1964	1965	1966	1967	1968
Olympics						3rd				
Worlds				8th	5th	4th	2nd	4th	5th	4th
North America					3rd		2nd		2nd	
National
United States	2nd N	7th J	2nd J	2nd	2nd	1st	2nd	1st	2nd	
Levels: N = Novice; J = Junior
