= Harry L. Towe =

American politician

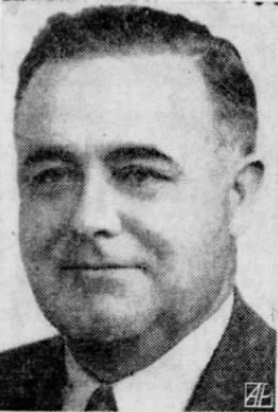
- Asbury Park Press, February 13, 1948

Member of the U.S. House of Representatives from New Jersey's 9th district
- In office January 3, 1943 – September 7, 1951
- Preceded by: Frank C. Osmers Jr.
- Succeeded by: Frank C. Osmers Jr.

Member of the New Jersey General Assembly
- In office 1941–1942

Personal details
- Born: Harry Lancaster Towe; November 3, 1898 Jersey City, New Jersey
- Died: February 4, 1991 (aged 92) Tenafly, New Jersey
- Party: Republican

Harry Lancaster Towe (November 3, 1898 in Jersey City, New Jersey – February 4, 1991 in Tenafly, New Jersey) was an American Republican Party politician who represented New Jersey's 9th congressional district in the United States House of Representatives for four terms from 1943 to 1951.

== Early life and career ==
Born in Jersey City, New Jersey, November 3, 1898, Towe attended the public schools of Passaic, New Jersey. He attended the United States Naval Academy from 1918 to 1920 and graduated from New Jersey Law School at Newark in 1925.

He was admitted to the bar the same year and commenced practice in Rutherford, New Jersey. Towe was United States commissioner from 1929 to 1931 and special assistant attorney general of New Jersey from 1931 to 1934. He was a member of the New Jersey General Assembly in 1941 and 1942.

== Congress ==
Towe was elected as a Republican to the Seventy-eighth and to the four succeeding Congresses and served from January 3, 1943, until his resignation September 7, 1951, to become an assistant attorney general of New Jersey, in which capacity he served until October 31, 1953.

== Later career and death ==
He engaged in the practice of law in Hackensack, New Jersey and was secretary and general counsel of the publishing firm of Medical Economics, Inc. from 1960 to 1969. He lived in Rutherford and was a resident of the Smoke Rise section of Kinnelon, New Jersey, until his death on February 4, 1991, at his home in Lakewood Township, New Jersey.

U.S. House of Representatives
| Preceded by Frank C. Osmers Jr. | Member of the U.S. House of Representatives from New Jersey's 9th congressional district January 3, 1943-September 7, 1951 | Succeeded by Frank C. Osmers Jr. |
