= Kurt Allerman =

American football player (born 1955)

No. 50, 60, 51, 95
- Position: Linebacker

Personal information
- Born: August 30, 1955 (age 71); Glen Ridge, New Jersey, U.S.
- Listed height: 6 ft 3 in (1.91 m)
- Listed weight: 222 lb (101 kg)

Career information
- High school: Kinnelon (Kinnelon, New Jersey)
- College: Penn State
- NFL draft: 1977: 3rd round, 78th overall pick

Career history
- St. Louis Cardinals (1977–1979); Green Bay Packers (1980–1981); St. Louis Cardinals (1982–1984); Detroit Lions (1985)

Awards and highlights
- First-team All-American (1976); First-team All-East (1976)
- Stats at Pro Football Reference

Kurt Allerman (born 1955) is an American former professional football player who was a linebacker for nine seasons in the National Football League (NFL). A native of Kinnelon, New Jersey, Allerman played college football for the Penn State Nittany Lions, earning first-team All-American honors in 1976.
