= Rand Araskog =

American businessman (1931–2021)

- Born: Rand Vincent Araskog; October 31, 1931; Fergus Falls, Minnesota, U.S.
- Died: August 9, 2021 (aged 89); Palm Beach, Florida, U.S.
- Education: West Point, Harvard University
- Occupations: Manufacturing executive, investor, writer
- Employer(s): Honeywell, ITT Corporation
- Known for: CEO of ITT Corporation
- Spouse: Jessie M. Gustafson Araskog
- Children: 3

Rand Vincent Araskog (October 31, 1931 – August 9, 2021) was an American manufacturing executive, investor, and writer who was the CEO of ITT Corporation. During his time as the CEO between 1979 and 1998 he was known for divesting the conglomerate of multiple businesses including hotels, rental cars, and insurance to retain its focus on its core telecom businesses.

== Early life ==
Rand Vincent Araskog was born on October 30, 1931, in Fergus Falls, Minnesota in a family of Swedish descent. His father was a tax collector and a dairy farmer in the town. He was elected as a valedictorian in his school and went on to the United States Military Academy at West Point where he graduated in 1953, majoring in Soviet studies. He graduated from Harvard University majoring in Russian studies and spent a year in West Germany serving at a US Army intelligence post.

== Career ==
Araskog started his career working for the Defense Department at the Pentagon and the National Security Agency from where he was sent to work in Europe. Upon his return to the U.S., he left the Pentagon and worked for Honeywell in 1960 as marketing director in the aeronautical division.

In 1966, he joined ITT Corporation in its Defense Space Group in Nutley, New Jersey. When he joined the company, it had grown since its founding in 1920 as a telecom service provider for Cuba and Puerto Rico, to being a conglomerate with business interests spanning Avis Car Rentals, Hartford Insurance, Sheraton Hotels and Hostess Twinkies, the company that manufactured Wonder Bread. During this time, he had become the right hand man of then chairman Harold Geneen. The company during this time was under scrutiny for its lobbying efforts in Washington, D.C. and for foreign political interference in Chilean politics. With this background, he became the company's CEO in 1979 succeeding Lyman C. Hamilton. He also became the chairman of the board the same year, succeeding Geneen.

His early years were spent building the group's telecom business, including developing the ITT System 12, an early stage digital telephone exchange, before selling the business to French state-owned company Generale d’Electricite in 1986. He continued to spend the remainder of his time as the CEO in divesting the vast conglomerate as investors were vying for focus on its core businesses. He saw off a hostile takeover bid by Hilton Hotels corporation but agreed to sell the group's hotel businesses under the Sheraton brand to Starwood Hotel & Resorts Worldwide, Inc. in 1997. He retired from the company in 1998.

Araskog was named an Officer in the French Legion of Honor in 1987. He has also been awarded the Order of Merit of the Italian Republic by the President of Italy and the Order of Bernardo O'Higgins by the president of Chile. He was awarded an honorary doctorate of humane letters by Hofstra University in 1990.

He was later self-employed as a private investor and also acted as principal in RVA Investments and on the Board of Directors of American cable television company Cablevision and the Palm Beach Civic Association.

== Personal life ==
Araskog met his wife Jessie Gustafson, when she was studying religion at Gustavus Adolphus College. The couple married in July 1956 and went on to have three children, two daughters and one son. He died on August 9, 2021, at the age of 89 in Palm Beach, Florida.

For many years, Araskog resided with his family in the gated community of Smoke Rise, located in Kinnelon, New Jersey, a suburb of New York.

== Bibliography ==
- Araskog, Rand V. (2000). The ITT Wars: An Insider's View of Hostile Takeovers. New York: Beard Books. ISBN 1-89312-238-7.
- Araskog, Rand V. (1989). Dawn Raiders and White Knights: The Inside Story of a Corporation Under Siege. New York: HarperCollins. ISBN 1-853-36160-7.
- Araskog, Rand V.; Bikoff, James L. (1987). Toward the Year 2000. New York: ITT Corporation.
