= William A. Pailes =

American astronaut (born 1952)

William Arthur Pailes
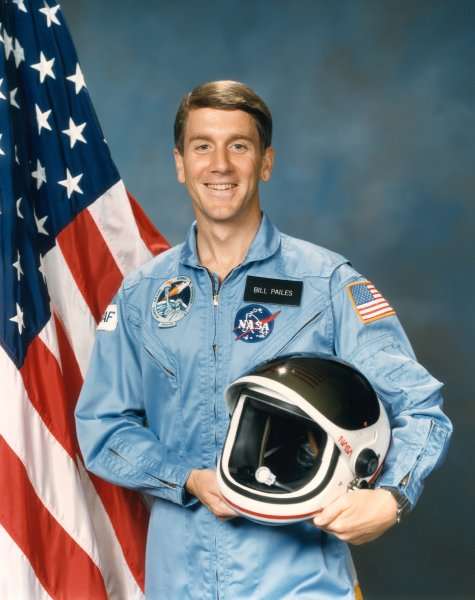
- Born: June 26, 1952 (age 74); Hackensack, New Jersey
- Education: United States Air Force Academy; Texas A&M University
- Occupation: Computer Scientist
- Space career

USAF astronaut
- Status: Retired
- Rank: Colonel, USAF Retired
- Time in space: 4d 01h 44 m
- Selection: 1982 USAF Group
- Missions: STS-51-J
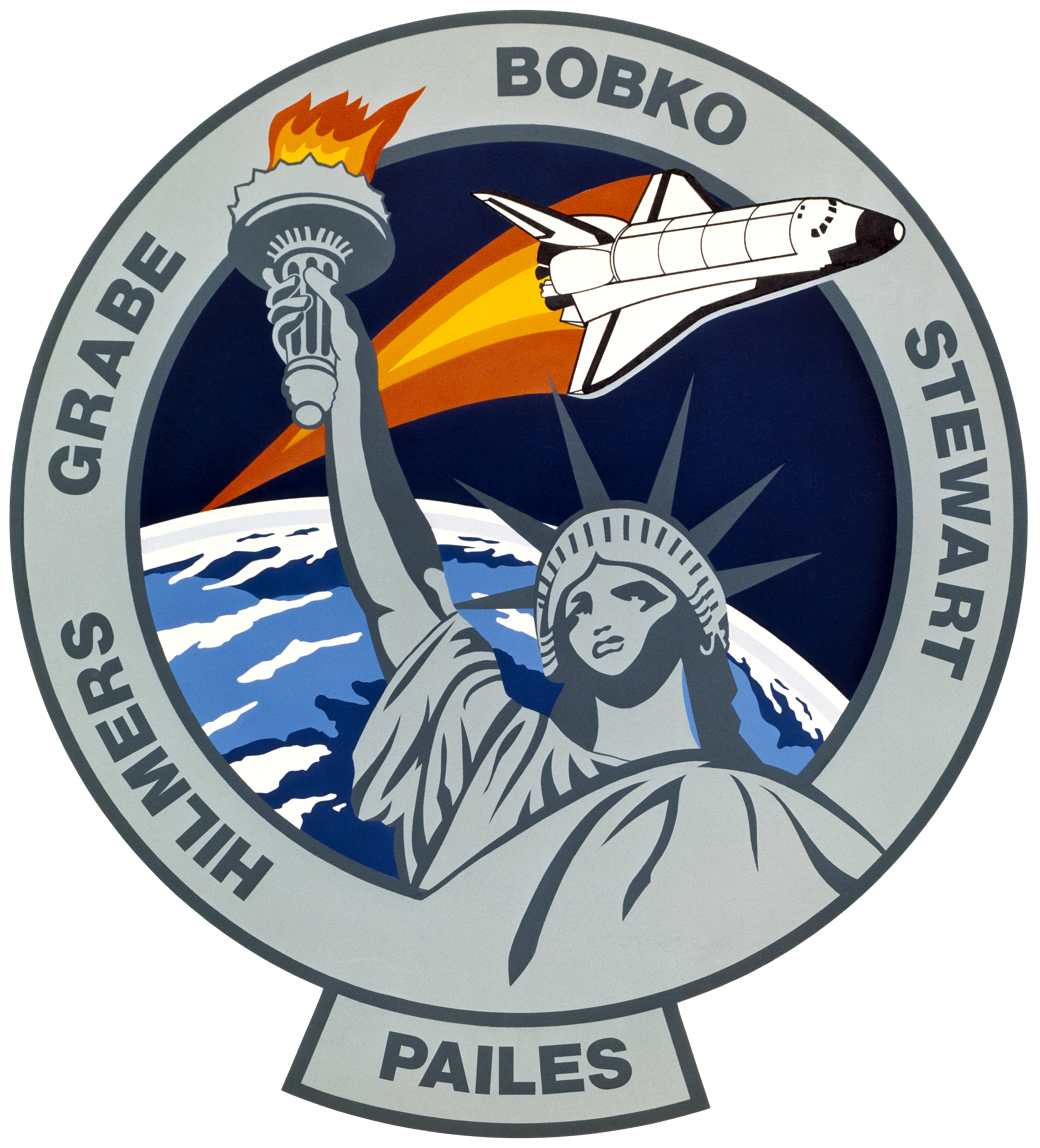
- Mission insignia

William Arthur Pailes (Colonel, USAF) (born June 26, 1952) is a former USAF astronaut in the Manned Spaceflight Engineer Program during the mid-1980s. He served as a payload specialist on STS-51-J Atlantis (October 3–7, 1985).

== Personal ==
Pailes was born in Hackensack, New Jersey, but considers Kinnelon, New Jersey, to be his hometown. He is married and is a former deacon and treasurer of his church in El Segundo, California. He has retired from teaching the AFJROTC Program at Temple High School in Temple, Texas. He was the senior aerospace science instructor until August 2018.

== Education ==
Pailes graduated from Kinnelon High School in Kinnelon, New Jersey, in 1970. He then received his Bachelor of Science degree in computer science at the USAF Academy in Colorado Springs, Colorado, four years later.

From 1974 to 1975 he attended pilot training at the Williams Air Force Base, Arizona, where he trained as a HC-130 rescue pilot in the Aerospace Rescue and Recovery Service. In 1978, he attended the Squadron Officer School.

Pailes received his Master of Science degree in computer science at Texas A&M University in 1981.

== Experience ==
He was an HC-130 pilot in Air Force Rescue from December 1975 to July 1980 in McClellan Air Force Base, California, and Royal Air Force Base, Woodbridge, England. He was then manager, minicomputer operating systems software development, from January 1982 to December 1982 at Headquarters Military Airlift Command, Scott Air Force Base, Illinois. He was a manned spaceflight engineer from January 1983 at USAF Manned Spaceflight Engineering Program, Los Angeles Air Force Station, California.

From August 2002 to 2011 he was the instructor of the AFJROTC Program, Corsicana, Texas, as a JROTC senior aerospace science instructor. From August 2011 to 2019, he was the instructor of the AFJROTC Program, Temple, Texas, as a JROTC senior aerospace science instructor.

He now lives in Missouri.

== Spaceflight experience ==
Colonel Pailes flew as a payload specialist on STS-51-J Atlantis (October 3–7, 1985) which launched from Kennedy Space Center, Florida, and returned to land at Edwards Air Force Base, California. STS-51-J was the second Space Shuttle Department of Defense mission. It was also the maiden voyage of the Atlantis orbiter. Pailes traveled over 1.6 million miles in 64 Earth orbits and logged more than 97 hours in space.
