= Kinnelon Public Schools =

School district in Morris County, New Jersey, US

Address
- 109 Kiel Avenue Kinnelon, Morris County, New Jersey, 07405; United States
- Coordinates: 41.001374°N 74.349492°W

District information
- Grades: PreK-12
- Superintendent: David C. Mango
- Business administrator: Kaitlyn Lawler
- Schools: 4

Students and staff
- Enrollment: 1,670 (as of 2020–21)
- Faculty: 165.0 FTEs
- Student–teacher ratio: 10.1:1

Other information
- District Factor Group: I
- Website: www.kinnelonpublicschools.org
Ind.	Per pupil	District spending	Rank (*)	K-12 average	%± vs. average
1A	Total Spending	$19,291	52	$18,891	2.1%
1	Budgetary Cost	14,840	49	14,783	0.4%
2	Classroom Instruction	8,749	53	8,763	−0.2%
6	Support Services	2,350	49	2,392	−1.8%
8	Administrative Cost	1,489	30	1,485	0.3%
10	Operations & Maintenance	1,661	39	1,783	−6.8%
13	Extracurricular Activities	551	62	268	105.6%
16	Median Teacher Salary	69,635	60	64,043
Data from NJDoE 2014 Taxpayers' Guide to Education Spending. *Of K-12 districts with 1,800-3,500 students. Lowest spending=1; Highest=68

The Kinnelon Public Schools is a comprehensive community public school district that serves students in pre-kindergarten through twelfth grade from Kinnelon, in Morris County, in the U.S. state of New Jersey.

As of the 2020–21 school year, the district, comprised of four schools, had an enrollment of 1,670 students and 165.0 classroom teachers (on an FTE basis), for a student–teacher ratio of 10.1:1.

== History ==
After the Kinnelon and West Milford school districts were notified in August 1959 that their students would no longer be accommodated at Butler High School within two to three years, the two districts joined in discussions with the Bloomingdale School District for the establishment of a regional school district, though this proposal never panned out.

With a turnout of nearly 60%, the highest in a non-presidential election, voters narrowly approved a January 1960 referendum that allocated $2 million (equivalent to $21.3 million in 2025) for the construction of a building on a 54-acre (22 ha) site that would be designed to accommodate a maximum capacity of 840 to 1,000 students, and would open starting with grades 7–10 and adding a grade each year over the next two years.

In August 1960, the Riverdale School District sought approval from the state for a plan to shift its students out of Butler High School and to send their students to Kinnelon for grades 7–12.

Built with a capacity of 800, the school opened in phases starting in October 1962 as sections of the facility were completed and had 620 students in its inaugural year, including 200 from Riverdale, who attended as part of a sending/receiving relationship.

Starting in the 1991–92 school year, students from Riverdale started attending Pompton Lakes High School; a far lower cost per student at and proximity to Pompton Lakes was cited as the main reasons for the change.

The district had been classified by the New Jersey Department of Education as being in District Factor Group "I", the second-highest of eight groupings. District Factor Groups organize districts statewide to allow comparison by common socioeconomic characteristics of the local districts. From lowest socioeconomic status to highest, the categories are A, B, CD, DE, FG, GH, I and J.

== Schools ==
Schools in the district (with 2020–21 enrollment data from the National Center for Education Statistics) are:

Elementary schools

- Kiel Elementary School with 312 students in grades PreK–2
  - Mark Mongon, principal
- Stonybrook Elementary School with 346 students in grades 3–5
  - Dawn Uttel, principal

Middle schools

- Pearl R. Miller Middle School with 427 students in grades 6–8
  - Gary Suda, principal

High school

- Kinnelon High School with 570 students in grades 9–12
  - Jennifer Oluwole, principal

== Administration ==
Core members of the district's administration are:

- David C. Mango, superintendent
- Kaitlyn Lawler, business administrator and board secretary

== Board of education ==
The district's board of education, comprised of nine members, sets policy and oversees the fiscal and educational operation of the district through its administration. As a Type II school district, the board's trustees are elected directly by voters to serve three-year terms of office on a staggered basis, with three seats up for election each year held (since 2012) as part of the November general election. The board appoints a superintendent to oversee the district's day-to-day operations and a business administrator to supervise the business functions of the district.
