= Kitty Ann Mountain =

Mountain in New Jersey, USA

Coordinates: 41°00′30.9″N 74°24′58.8″W

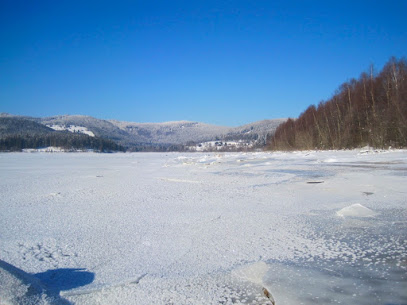

Highest point
- Elevation: 1,159 feet (353 m)
- Prominence: 892 ft.

Geography
- Location: Morris County, New Jersey
- Parent range: Ramapo Mountains

Kitty Ann Mountain in New Jersey, United States is located in the Ramapos of the Appalachian Mountains, rising above Kinnelon in Morris County. The mountain has an 80-foot tower atop it. The summit lies at 1,159 feet (353 m) above sea level. The prominence of the north slope is 892 feet (272 m), the highest in New Jersey; the east, west, and south slopes are 814 feet (248 m), 758 feet (231 m), and 259 feet (79 m).

== Rocks and development ==
The mountain, which grows 2.4 millimeters a year as a result of the Ramapo mountain fault, is composed of granite, marble, limestone, quartz, and gneiss.

== Trees and wildlife ==
Local arboreal flora include birch, maple, oak, pine, and sassafras; wildlife includes white-tailed deer, rabbits, squirrels, coyote, fox, raccoon, beaver, groundhog, American black bear, and eastern wolf.
