= STS-51-J =

1985 American crewed spaceflight for the Department of Defense

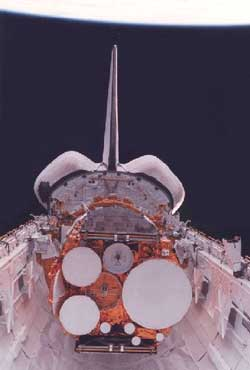
- DSCS-III satellites in Atlantis' payload bay
- Names: Space Transportation System-21
- Mission type: Satellite deployment
- Operator: NASA / U.S. DoD
- COSPAR ID: 1985-092A
- SATCAT no.: 16115
- Mission duration: 4 days, 1 hour, 44 minutes and 38 seconds
- Distance travelled: 2,707,948 km (1,682,641 mi)
- Orbits completed: 64

Spacecraft properties
- Spacecraft: Space Shuttle Atlantis
- Launch mass: N/A
- Landing mass: 86,400 kg (190,500 lb)
- Payload mass: 19,968 kg (44,022 lb)

Crew
- Crew size: 5
- Members: Karol J. Bobko; Ronald J. Grabe; David C. Hilmers; Robert L. Stewart; William A. Pailes

Start of mission
- Launch date: October 3, 1985, 15:15:30 UTC (11:15:30 am EDT)
- Launch site: Kennedy, LC-39A
- Contractor: Rockwell International

End of mission
- Landing date: October 7, 1985, 17:00:08 UTC (10:00:08 am PDT)
- Landing site: Edwards, Runway 23

Orbital parameters
- Reference system: Geocentric orbit
- Regime: Low Earth orbit
- Perigee altitude: 475 km (295 mi)
- Apogee altitude: 484 km (301 mi)
- Inclination: 28.50°
- Period: 94.20 minutes
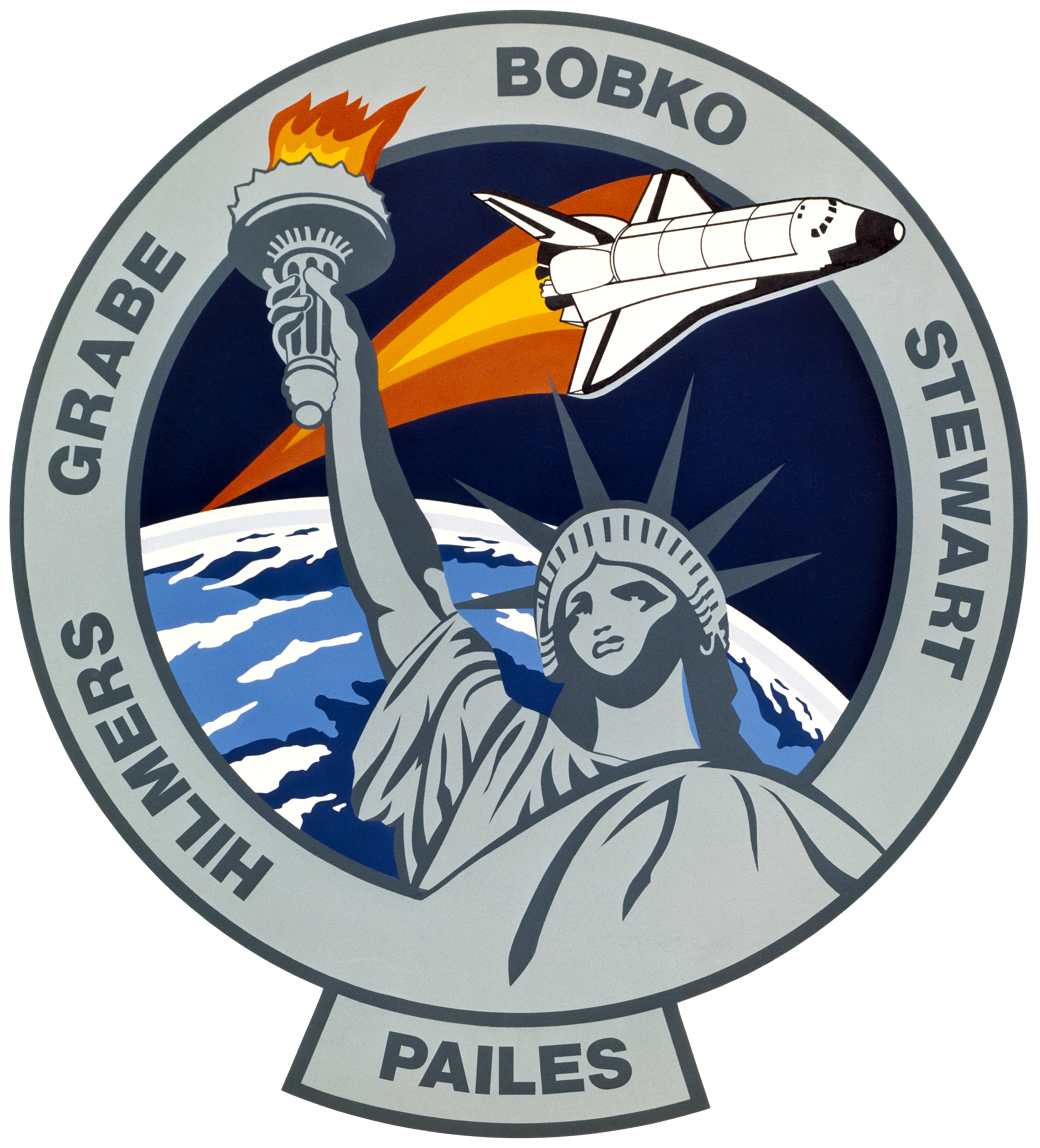
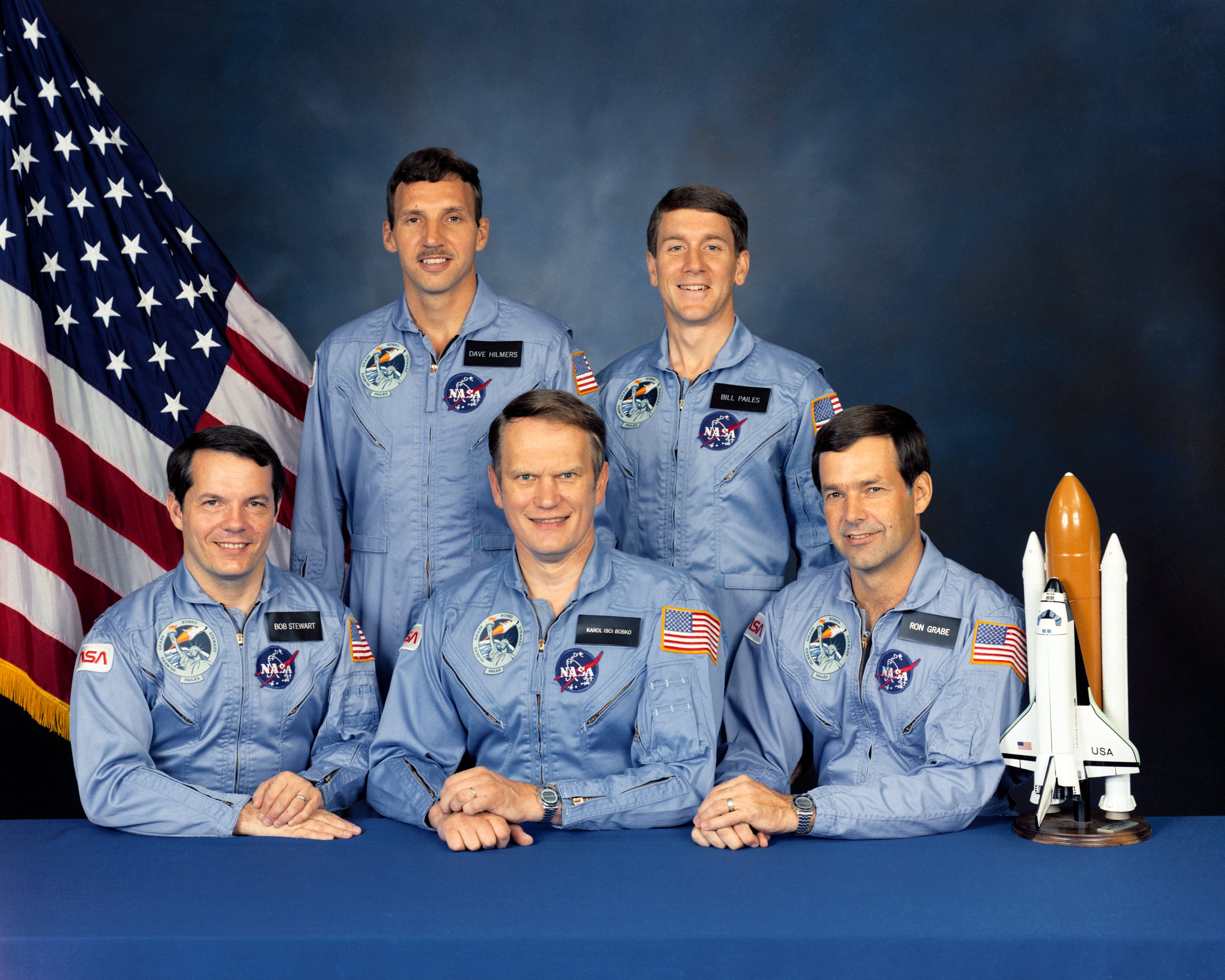
- STS-51-J mission patch From left: Stewart, Hilmers, Bobko, Pailes and Grabe Space Shuttle program

STS-51-J was NASA's 21st Space Shuttle mission and the maiden flight of Space Shuttle Atlantis. It launched from Kennedy Space Center, Florida, on October 3, 1985, carrying a payload for the U.S. Department of Defense (DoD), and landed at Edwards Air Force Base, California, on October 7, 1985.

== Crew ==
Position	Astronaut
Commander	Karol J. Bobko; Third and last spaceflight
Pilot	Ronald J. Grabe; First spaceflight
Mission Specialist 1	David C. Hilmers; First spaceflight
Mission Specialist 2 Flight Engineer	Robert L. Stewart; Second and last spaceflight
Payload Specialist 1	William A. Pailes, MSE; Only spaceflight
All five astronauts on the secret mission were active-duty military officers. Before William A. Pailes was assigned to the STS-51-J flight, Mike Mullane was rumored to have been assigned as mission specialist 3 on his second trip to space.

=== Backup crew ===
Position	Astronaut
Payload Specialist 1	Michael W. Booen, MSE

=== Crew seat assignments ===
Seat	Launch	Landing	Seats 1–4 are on the flight deck. Seats 5–7 are on the mid-deck.
1	Bobko		Seats 1–4 are on the flight deck. Seats 5–7 are on the mid-deck.
2	Grabe		Seats 1–4 are on the flight deck. Seats 5–7 are on the mid-deck.
3	Hilmers		Seats 1–4 are on the flight deck. Seats 5–7 are on the mid-deck.
4	Stewart		Seats 1–4 are on the flight deck. Seats 5–7 are on the mid-deck.
5	Pailes		Seats 1–4 are on the flight deck. Seats 5–7 are on the mid-deck.
6	Unused		Seats 1–4 are on the flight deck. Seats 5–7 are on the mid-deck.
7	Unused		Seats 1–4 are on the flight deck. Seats 5–7 are on the mid-deck.

== Mission summary ==
STS-51-J launched on October 3, 1985, at 15:15:30 UTC (11:15:30 a.m. EDT), from Launch Pad 39A at the Kennedy Space Center. The launch was delayed by 22 minutes and 30 seconds due to a problem with a main engine liquid hydrogen prevalve close remote power controller; the controller was showing a faulty "on" indication.

The mission was the second shuttle flight totally dedicated to deploying a United States Department of Defense payload, after STS-51-C. Its cargo was classified, but it was reported that two (USA-11 and USA-12) DSCS-III (Defense Satellite Communications System) satellites were launched into geostationary orbits by an Inertial Upper Stage (IUS). The DSCS satellites used X-band frequencies (8/7 GHz). Each DSCS-III satellite had a design life of ten years, although several of the DSCS satellites have far exceeded their design life expectancy.

The mission was deemed successful. After a flight lasting 4 days, 1 hour, 44 minutes and 38 seconds, Atlantis landed on Runway 23 at Edwards Air Force Base at 17:00:08 UTC (13:00:08 EDT) on October 7, 1985. During STS-51-J, mission commander Bobko became the first astronaut to fly on three different shuttle orbiters, and the only astronaut to fly on the maiden voyages of two different orbiters.

Attempt	Planned	Result	Turnaround	Reason	Decision point	Weather go (%)	Notes
1	3 Oct 1985, 11:15:30 am	Success	—	Technical			Delayed due to faulty indication from main engine liquid hydrogen prevalve close remote power controller.

== Mission insignia ==
The 51-J mission insignia, designed by Atlantis's first crew, pays tribute to the Statue of Liberty and the ideas it symbolizes, but also as not to emphasize the "classified" nature of the mission like the first one did. The historical gateway figure bears additional significance for astronauts Karol J. Bobko, mission commander; and Ronald J. Grabe, pilot, both New York City natives.

== Gallery ==
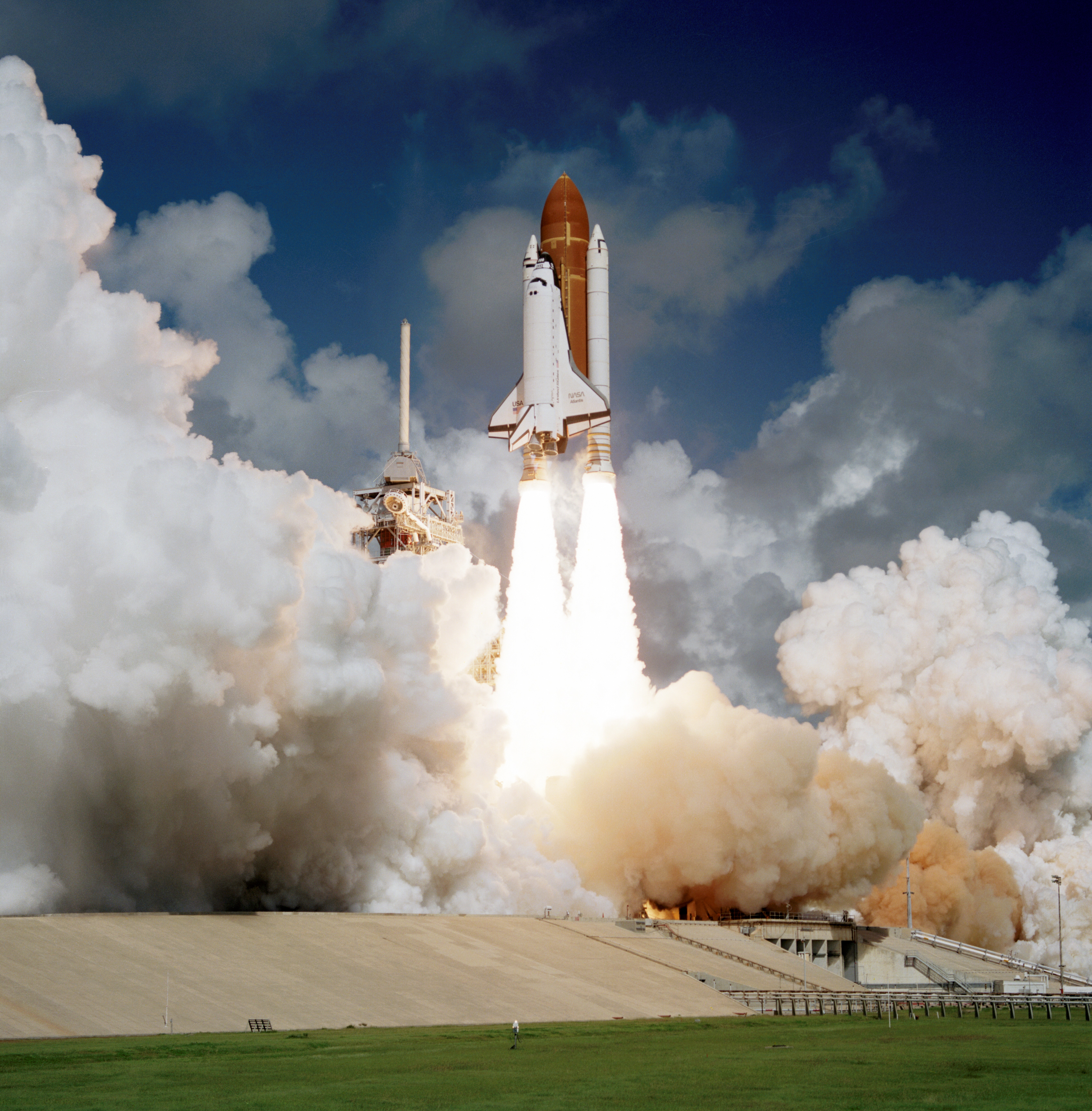
Atlantis lifting off the pad.

== See also ==
- List of human spaceflights
- List of Space Shuttle missions
- Militarization of space
