= Stearns Matthews =

American musician (born 1984)

- Born: Paul Stearns Matthews; 1984 (age 41–42); Hartford, Connecticut
- Education: Bachelor of Music in Music Theater, Westminster Choir College
- Occupations: Singer, recording artist, director, teacher, pianist
- Board member of: Manhattan Association of Cabarets
- Spouse: Michael Hetrick (2007-present)
- Musical career
- Genres: Pop standards, showtunes
- Website: www.stearnsmatthews.com

Stearns Matthews (born 1984) is an American, New York-based cabaret singer, recording artist, director, teacher, and pianist. He has performed throughout the United States as well as the United Kingdom.

== Awards ==
- 2015 Lamott/Friedman MAC Award for Best Recording
- 2015 MAC Award for Best Male Vocalist
- 2015 Bistro Award for Outstanding Recording
