= 1968 United States presidential election in New Jersey =

- November 5, 1968
- Turnout: 86.81% (▼1.68%)

Nominee	Richard Nixon	Hubert Humphrey	George Wallace
Party	Republican	Democratic	George Wallace Party
Alliance			American Independent
Home state	New York (Note: Although he was born in California and he served as a U.S. senator from California, in 1968 Richard Nixon's official state of residence was New York, because he moved there to practice law after his defeat in the 1962 California gubernatorial election. During his first term as president, Nixon re-established his residency in California. Consequently, most reliable reference books list Nixon's home state as New York in the 1968 election and his home state as California in the 1972 (and 1960) election.)	Minnesota	Alabama
Running mate	Spiro Agnew	Edmund Muskie	S. Marvin Griffin
Electoral vote	17	0	0
Popular vote	1,325,467	1,264,206	262,187
Percentage	46.10%	43.97%	9.12%
County results
Nixon
40–50%
50–60%
60–70%
Humphrey
40–50%
50–60%
President before election
Lyndon Johnson
Democratic
Elected President
Richard Nixon
Republican

The 1968 United States presidential election in New Jersey took place on November 5, 1968. All 50 states and the District of Columbia, were part of the 1968 United States presidential election. Voters chose 17 electors to the Electoral College, which selected the president and vice president.

New Jersey was won by the Republican nominees, former Vice President Richard Nixon of California and his running mate Governor Spiro Agnew of Maryland. Nixon and Agnew defeated the Democratic nominees, incumbent Vice President Hubert H. Humphrey of Minnesota and his running mate Senator Edmund Muskie of Maine. Also in the running was the American Independent Party candidate, Governor George Wallace of Alabama, and his running mate U.S. Air Force General Curtis LeMay of California.

Nixon carried New Jersey with a plurality of 46.10% to Humphrey's 43.97%, a margin of 2.13%. In a distant third came Wallace with 9.12%. In the midst of a narrow Republican victory nationally, New Jersey voted closely in line with the nation at large, its result was just 1% more Republican than the national average.

Nixon's victory was the first of six consecutive Republican victories in the state, as New Jersey would not vote for a Democratic candidate again until Bill Clinton in 1992, after which the state has always gone Democratic. Nixon became the first ever Republican to win the White House without carrying Atlantic, Essex, or Cumberland Counties, as well as the first to do so without carrying Middlesex County since Benjamin Harrison in 1888. This is only the second election, along with 1932, when New Jersey was won by a 1.89% margin by FDR, since 1880 in which New Jersey voted for a different candidate than nearby Connecticut.

== Results ==
1968 United States presidential election in New Jersey
Party	Candidate	Votes	Percentage	Electoral votes
Republican	Richard Nixon	1,325,467	46.10%	17
Democratic	Hubert H. Humphrey	1,264,206	43.97%	0
American Independent	George Wallace	262,187	9.12%	0
Socialist Workers	Fred Halstead	8,667	0.30%	0
Peace and Freedom Party	Dick Gregory	8,084	0.28%	0
Socialist Labor	Henning A. Blomen	6,784	0.24%	0
Totals		2,875,395	100.0%	17
Voter Turnout (Voting age/Registered)				66%/87%

=== Results by county ===
County	Richard Nixon Republican		Hubert Humphrey Democratic		George Wallace American Independent		Various candidates Other parties		Margin		Total votes cast
County	#	%	#	%	#	%	#	%	#	%	Total votes cast
Atlantic	32,807	42.15%	35,581	45.71%	7,528	9.67%	1,918	2.46%	-2,774	-3.56%	77,834
Bergen	224,911	54.45%	162,182	39.27%	23,663	5.73%	2,281	0.55%	62,729	15.18%	413,037
Burlington	46,177	46.29%	41,651	41.76%	11,635	11.66%	284	0.28%	4,526	4.53%	99,747
Camden	77,642	41.10%	87,347	46.24%	23,111	12.24%	787	0.42%	-9,705	-5.14%	188,887
Cape May	14,970	53.14%	9,664	34.30%	3,498	12.42%	40	0.14%	5,306	18.84%	28,172
Cumberland	18,388	40.42%	21,661	47.62%	5,356	11.77%	83	0.18%	-3,273	-7.20%	45,488
Essex	140,084	39.23%	185,440	51.93%	26,823	7.51%	4,748	1.33%	-45,356	-12.70%	357,095
Gloucester	30,596	44.52%	27,438	39.92%	10,626	15.46%	71	0.10%	3,158	4.60%	68,731
Hudson	91,324	37.34%	124,939	51.09%	23,138	9.46%	5,159	2.11%	-33,615	-13.75%	244,560
Hunterdon	15,851	57.77%	8,755	31.91%	2,749	10.02%	84	0.31%	7,096	25.86%	27,439
Mercer	45,354	36.13%	63,218	50.36%	16,104	12.83%	853	0.68%	-17,864	-14.23%	125,529
Middlesex	96,515	42.79%	103,339	45.82%	24,138	10.70%	1,538	0.68%	-6,824	-3.03%	225,530
Monmouth	87,311	51.22%	69,669	40.87%	13,047	7.65%	429	0.25%	17,642	10.35%	170,456
Morris	85,512	57.75%	52,398	35.39%	9,659	6.52%	493	0.33%	33,114	22.36%	148,062
Ocean	41,995	53.87%	26,909	34.52%	8,520	10.93%	539	0.69%	15,086	19.35%	77,963
Passaic	79,862	46.25%	74,442	43.12%	16,617	9.62%	1,736	1.01%	5,420	3.13%	172,657
Salem	11,407	43.45%	11,172	42.56%	3,647	13.89%	25	0.10%	235	0.89%	26,251
Somerset	42,459	54.11%	27,580	35.14%	7,331	9.34%	1,105	1.41%	14,879	18.97%	78,475
Sussex	18,043	61.71%	8,325	28.47%	2,843	9.72%	29	0.10%	9,718	33.24%	29,240
Union	110,309	45.72%	109,674	45.46%	19,963	8.27%	1,310	0.54%	635	0.26%	241,256
Warren	13,950	48.13%	12,822	44.24%	2,191	7.56%	23	0.08%	1,128	3.89%	28,986
Totals	1,325,467	46.10%	1,264,206	43.97%	262,187	9.12%	23,535	0.82%	61,261	2.13%	2,875,395

==== Counties that flipped from Democratic to Republican ====
- Burlington
- Gloucester
- Somerset
- Union
- Bergen
- Cape May
- Monmouth
- Ocean
- Passaic
- Salem
- Morris
- Hunterdon
- Warren
- Sussex

== Analysis ==
Despite the closeness of the statewide result, Nixon won a strong majority of the state's 21 counties, taking 14 counties, while Humphrey won 7. Humphrey kept the race fairly close by performing strongly in heavily populated core Democratic counties like Essex County, Hudson County, and Mercer County, along with winning Democratic-leaning counties like Middlesex County, Camden County, Atlantic County, and Cumberland County. Other highly populated counties like Passaic County and Union County were won by Nixon but only by narrow margins. Passaic County went to Nixon 46.3—43.1, while Union County went to Nixon by a razor-thin 45.7—45.5 margin.

Nixon was able to take the advantage statewide however with a big win in heavily populated Bergen County, taking 54.5% of the vote there, along with wins in several other fairly populated suburban counties like Monmouth County and Morris County, as well as winning many rural counties. Nixon's strongest county by vote share was rural Sussex County, where he received 61.7% of the vote to Humphrey's 28.5%. Humphrey's strongest county by vote share was urban Essex County, where he received 51.9% of the vote to Nixon's 39.2%.

George Wallace, running on a Southern populist platform, finished a distant third in New Jersey, with a single-digit vote share percentage. But this was still a surprisingly strong performance for Wallace in a Northeastern state like New Jersey. Discounting the border states of Maryland and Delaware, Wallace's 9.12% in New Jersey was the highest statewide vote share he received out of any Northeastern state. Wallace performed most strongly in South Jersey, where he broke into double-digit support in several counties. Wallace's strongest county was Gloucester County, a rural county in the southwestern portion of the state by the Delaware border, where he received 15.5% of the vote.

== See also ==
- United States presidential elections in New Jersey
- Presidency of Richard Nixon
