= 1812 United States presidential election in New Jersey =

- November – December 2, 1812
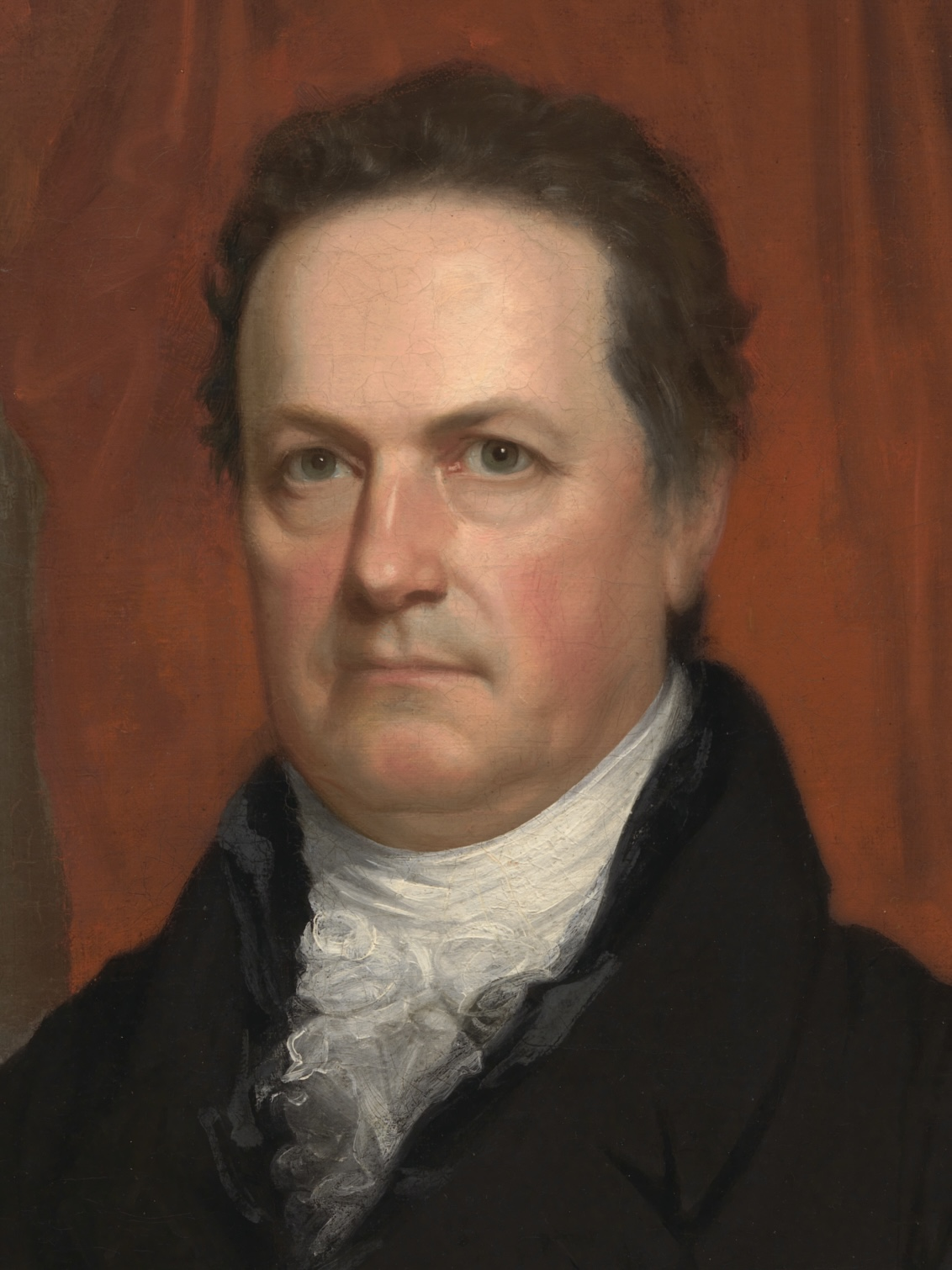

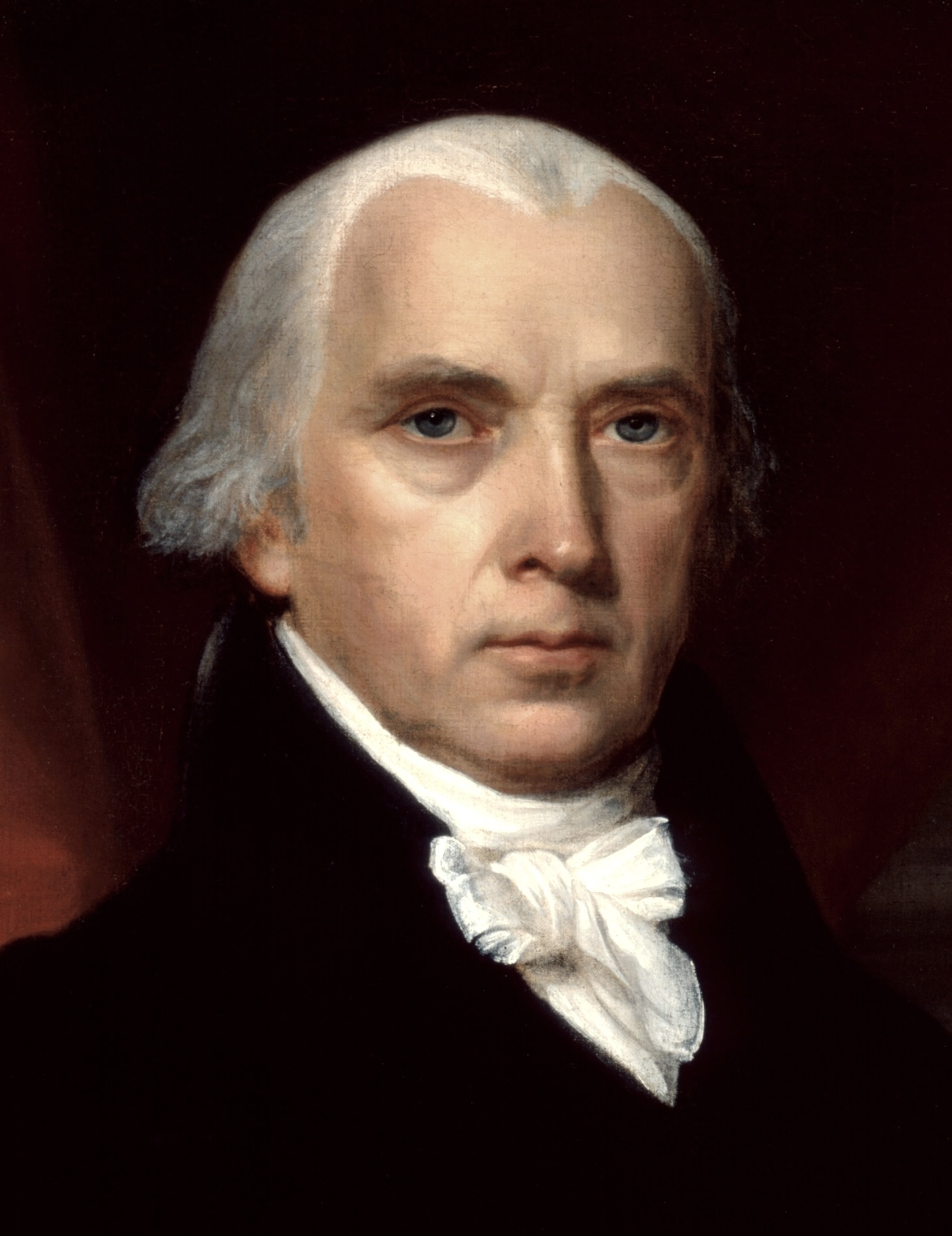
Nominee	DeWitt Clinton	James Madison
Party	Democratic-Republican (Note: While commonly labeled as the Federalist candidate, Clinton technically ran as a Democratic-Republican and was not nominated by the Federalist party itself, the latter simply deciding not to field a candidate. This did not prevent endorsements from state Federalist parties (such as in Pennsylvania), but he received the endorsement from the New York state Democratic-Republicans as well)	Democratic-Republican
Alliance	Federalist
Home state	New York	Virginia
Running mate	Jared Ingersoll	Elbridge Gerry
Electoral vote	8	0
Popular vote	2	1,672
Percentage	0.12%	99.88%
Legislative vote	29	23
Percentage	55.77%	44.23%
County results
Madison
>99%
No votes
President before election
James Madison
Democratic-Republican
Elected President
James Madison
Democratic-Republican

The 1812 United States presidential election in New Jersey occurred sometime between November and December 2, 1812, as part of the 1812 United States presidential election. Originally, the election was scheduled to take place in November 1812 via a general ticket, a practice that had been in place since the 1804 election. However, after securing a narrow majority in the October state legislature elections, the Federalists, adopting a strategy used by the Democratic-Republicans, changed the voting method to a legislative vote and delayed the election to a later date. Additionally, the Federalists altered the congressional elections, shifting from an at-large system to district-based elections.

In the legislative election, the legislature voted 29 to 23 in favor of Independent Democratic Republican and Federalist supported candidate DeWitt Clinton, with one not voting. Some towns, either because word of these changes did not reach them in time, or most likely in defiance, according to Historian Phil Lampi, went ahead and held the popular elections, giving Madison 1,672 votes to Clinton's 1 in two towns.

Elector Jonas Wade did not cast a vote in the Electoral College and was replaced with William Griffeth.

== Results ==
1812 United States presidential election in New Jersey
Party	Candidate	Votes	Percentage	Electoral votes
Democratic-Republican/Federalist	DeWitt Clinton	29	55.77%	8
Democratic-Republican	James Madison	23	44.23%	0
Totals		52	100.00%	8

== See also ==
- United States presidential elections in New Jersey
