= 1852 United States presidential election in New Jersey =

- November 2, 1852

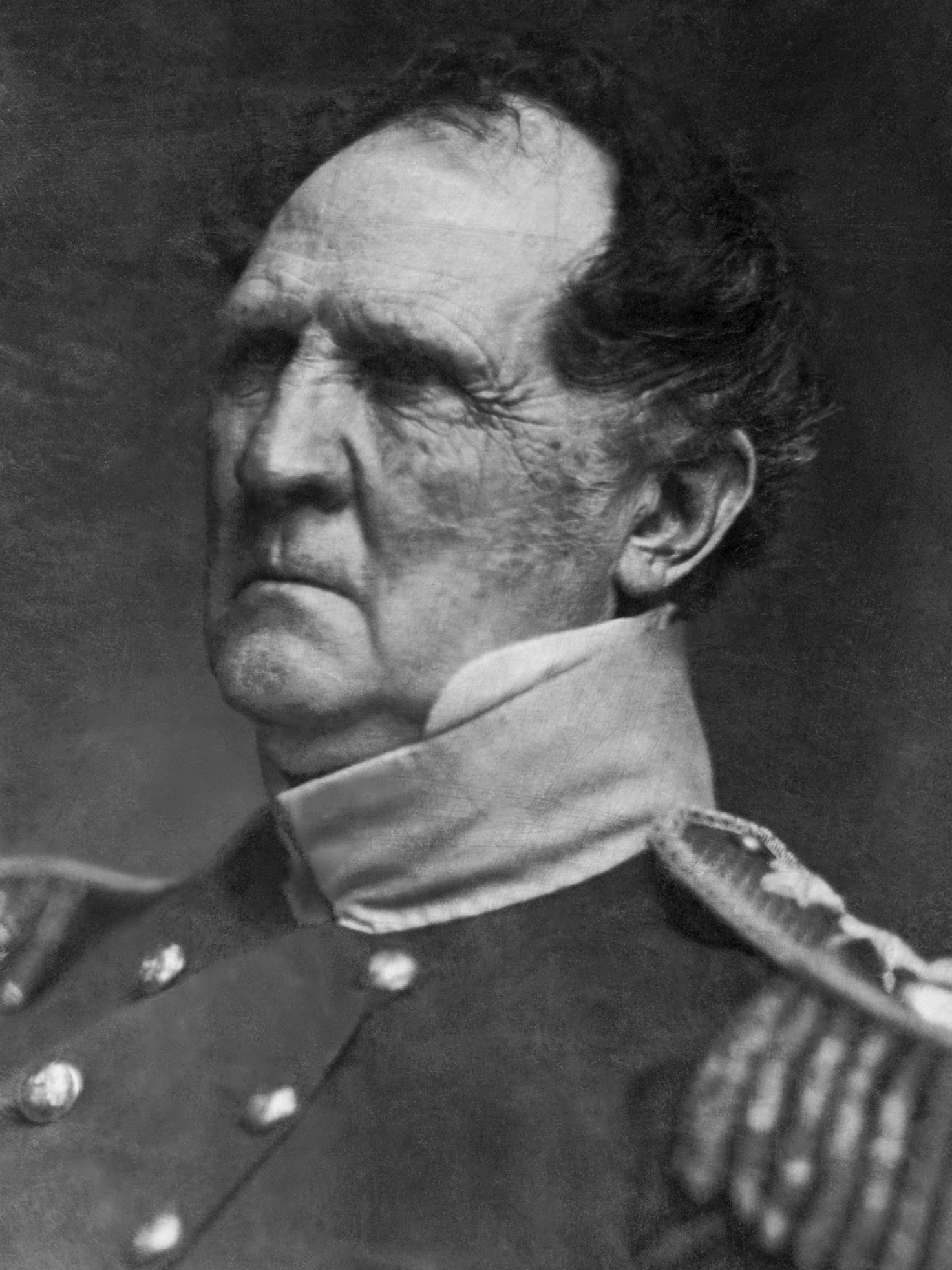
| Nominee | Franklin Pierce | Winfield Scott |
| Party | Democratic | Whig |
| Home state | New Hampshire | New Jersey |
| Running mate | William R. King | William Alexander Graham |
| Electoral vote | 7 | 0 |
| Popular vote | 44,305 | 38,556 |
| Percentage | 53.24% | 44.97% |
County results
Pierce
40–50%
50–60%
60–70%
70–80%
Scott
40–50%
50–60%
60–70%
President before election
Millard Fillmore
Whig
Elected President
Franklin Pierce
Democratic

The 1852 United States presidential election in New Jersey took place on November 2, 1852, as part of the 1852 United States presidential election. Voters chose seven representatives, or electors to the Electoral College, who voted for President and Vice President.

New Jersey voted for the Democratic candidate, Franklin Pierce, over the Whig Party candidate, Winfield Scott. Pierce won the state by a margin of 6.91%, making him the first Democratic presidential candidate since Andrew Jackson in 1832 to win the state. This is the last time that a Democrat won without carrying Middlesex County.

== Results ==
1852 United States presidential election in New Jersey
| Party | Candidate | Running mate | Popular vote | | Electoral vote | |
| Party | Candidate | Running mate | Count | % | Count | % |
|---|---|---|---|---|---|---|
| Democratic | Franklin Pierce of New Hampshire | William R. King of Alabama | 44,305 | 53.24% | 7 | 100.00% |
| Whig | Winfield Scott of New Jersey | William Alexander Graham of North Carolina | 38,556 | 46.33% | 0 | 0.00% |
| Free Soil | John P. Hale of New Hampshire | George W. Julian of Indiana | 359 | 0.43% | 0 | 0.00% |
| Total | | | 83,220 | 100.00% | 7 | 100.00% |

== See also ==
- United States presidential elections in New Jersey
