= 1840 United States presidential election in New Jersey =

- November 3–4, 1840
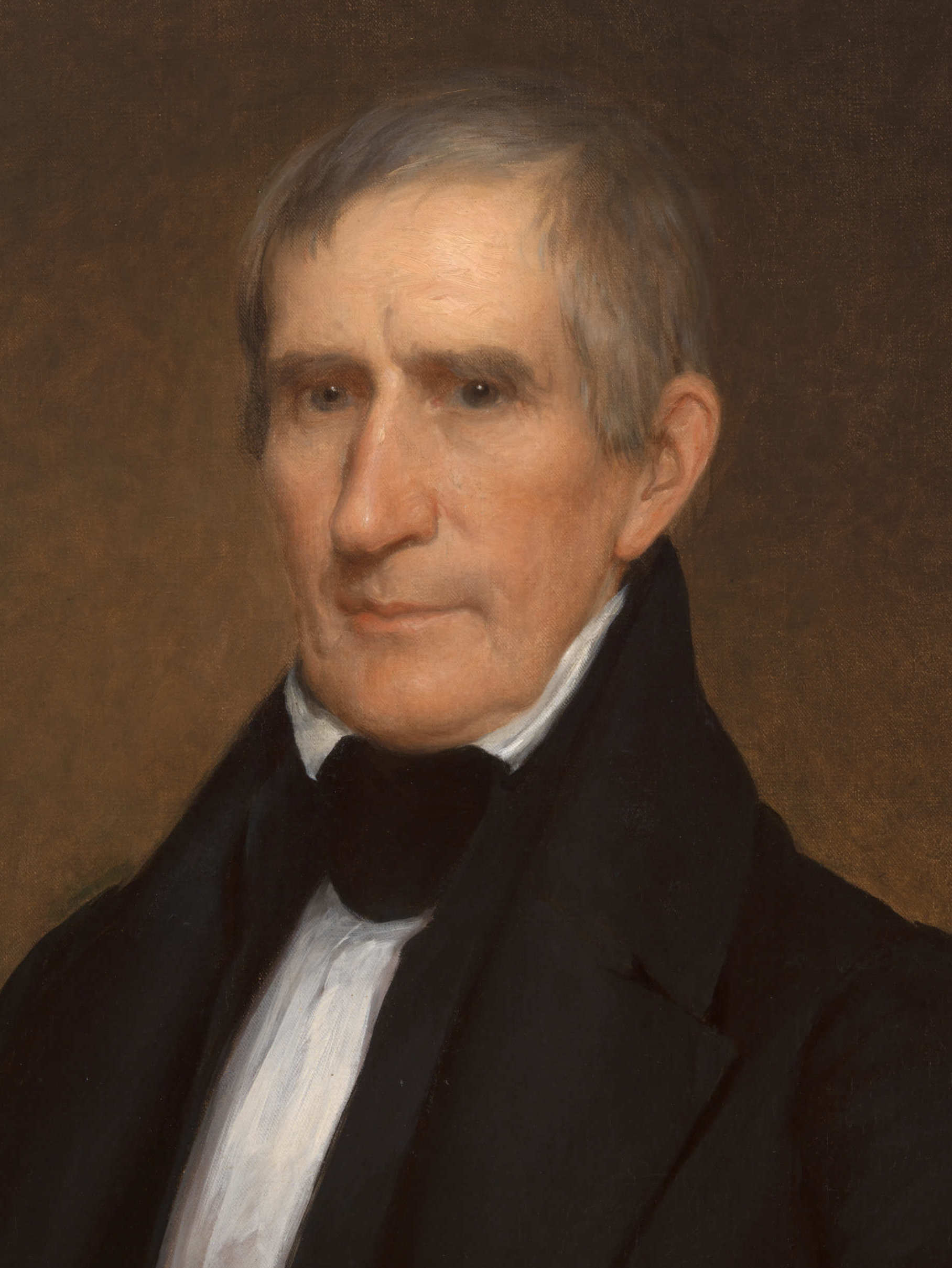

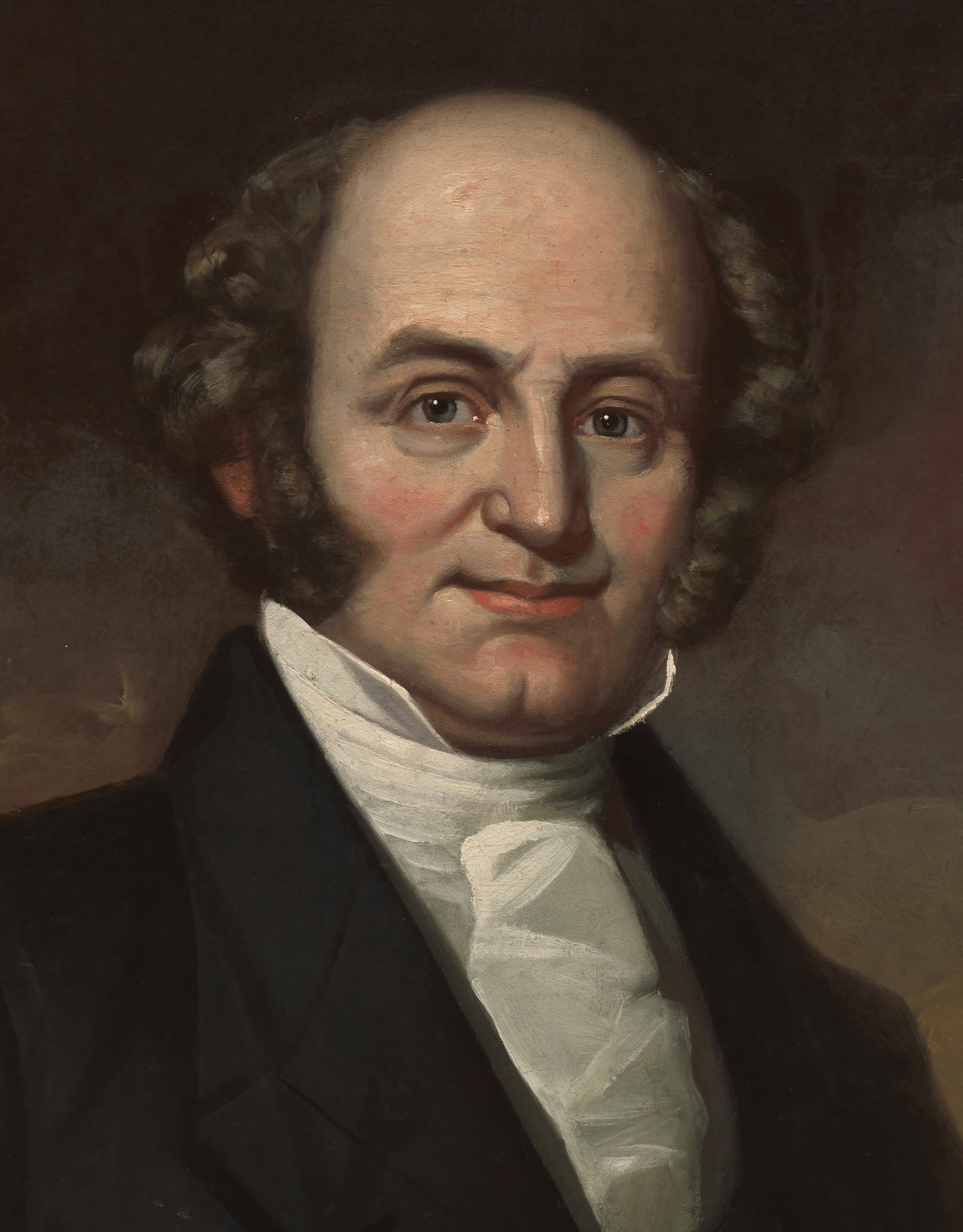
Nominee	William Henry Harrison	Martin Van Buren
Party	Whig	Democratic
Home state	Ohio	New York
Running mate	John Tyler	none
Electoral vote	8	0
Popular vote	33,351	31,034
Percentage	51.74%	48.15%
County results
Harrison
50–60%
60–70%
80–90%
Van Buren
50–60%
60–70%
70–80%
President before election
Martin Van Buren
Democratic
Elected President
William Henry Harrison
Whig

A presidential election was held in New Jersey from November 3–4, 1840 as part of the 1840 United States presidential election. Voters chose eight representatives, or electors to the Electoral College, who voted for President and Vice President.

New Jersey voted for the Whig candidate, William Henry Harrison, over Democratic candidate Martin Van Buren. Harrison won New Jersey by a narrow margin of 3.59%.

== Results ==
1840 United States presidential election in New Jersey
Party	Candidate	Running mate	Popular vote		Electoral vote	
Party	Candidate	Running mate	Count	%	Count	%
Whig	William Henry Harrison of Ohio	John Tyler of Virginia	33,351	51.74%	8	100.00%
Democratic	Martin Van Buren of New York	Richard Mentor Johnson of Kentucky	31,034	48.15%	0	0.00%
Liberty	James G. Birney of New York	Thomas Earle of Pennsylvania	69	0.11%	0	0.00%
Total			64,454	100.00%	8	100.00%

== See also ==
- United States presidential elections in New Jersey
