= 1944 United States presidential election in New Jersey =

- November 7, 1944
- Turnout: 83.07% (▼2.45%)

Nominee	Franklin D. Roosevelt	Thomas E. Dewey
Party	Democratic	Republican
Home state	New York	New York
Running mate	Harry S. Truman	John W. Bricker
Electoral vote	16	0
Popular vote	987,874	961,335
Percentage	50.31%	48.95%
County results
Roosevelt
50–60%
60–70%
Dewey
40–50%
50–60%
60–70%
President before election
Franklin D. Roosevelt
Democratic
Elected President
Franklin D. Roosevelt
Democratic

The 1944 United States presidential election in New Jersey took place on November 7, 1944. All contemporary 48 states were part of the 1944 United States presidential election. Voters chose 16 electors to the Electoral College, which selected the president and vice president.

New Jersey was won by the Democratic nominees, incumbent President Franklin D. Roosevelt of New York and his running mate Senator Harry S. Truman of Missouri. Roosevelt and Truman defeated the Republican nominees, Governor Thomas E. Dewey of New York and his running mate Governor John W. Bricker of Ohio.

Roosevelt narrowly carried New Jersey with 50.31% of the vote to Dewey's 48.95%, a margin of 1.35%. Reflecting the closeness of the statewide result, Roosevelt and Dewey virtually split the state's 21 counties: Roosevelt won 10 counties to Dewey's 11. Despite winning 1 less county, Roosevelt edged out Dewey statewide with decisive victories in some of the most heavily populated parts of the state, while keeping the results close in heavily populated counties that he lost.

In North Jersey, Roosevelt maintained his dominance in heavily populated Hudson County, part of the New York City metro area where the New Deal Coalition was very strong, breaking 60% of the vote in the county for the fourth election in a row. Roosevelt also won heavily populated Middlesex County, Mercer County, and Passaic County, although Dewey won majorities in Bergen County, Union County, and Morris County. Dewey also narrowly won Essex County with a plurality.

Roosevelt performed much more strongly overall in South Jersey, winning majorities in 6 out of 7 of the southernmost counties in the state; his strongest county win there was urban Camden County, where he broke 60% of the vote. In South Jersey, Dewey won only rural Cape May County. Besides his victories in North Jersey, Dewey also won Monmouth County and Ocean County in the central portion of the state.

New Jersey in this era was usually a swing state with a Republican lean, and its results in 1944 adhered to that pattern. Roosevelt had carried the state in the midst of all three of his preceding nationwide victories, but with the exception of his 1936 landslide, always by very narrow margins. As Roosevelt decisively won re-election to an unprecedented fourth term, carrying 36 out of 48 states, New Jersey was his second-narrowest victory in the nation. FDR's close 1.35% margin of victory in New Jersey made the state about 6% more Republican than the national average. Roosevelt was the first Democrat ever to win the presidency without Warren County.

== Results ==
1944 United States presidential election in New Jersey
Party	Candidate	Votes	Percentage	Electoral votes
Democratic	Franklin D. Roosevelt (incumbent)	987,874	50.31%	16
Republican	Thomas E. Dewey	961,335	48.95%	0
Socialist Labor	Edward A. Teichert	6,939	0.35%	0
National Prohibition	Claude A. Watson	4,255	0.22%	0
Socialist	Norman Thomas	3,358	0.17%	0
Totals		1,963,761	100.0%	16

=== Results by county ===
County	Franklin D. Roosevelt Democratic		Thomas E. Dewey Republican		Edward A. Teichert Socialist Labor		Claude A. Watson National Prohibition		Norman M. Thomas Socialist		Margin		Total votes cast
County	#	%	#	%	#	%	#	%	#	%	#	%	Total votes cast
Atlantic	28,972	52.87%	25,593	46.71%	155	0.28%	67	0.12%	7	0.01%	3,379	6.17%	54,794
Bergen	76,350	34.74%	142,836	65.00%	45	0.02%	150	0.07%	371	0.17%	-66,486	-30.26%	219,752
Burlington	22,623	54.57%	18,765	45.26%	4	0.01%	18	0.04%	50	0.12%	3,858	9.31%	41,460
Camden	85,691	66.76%	42,197	32.87%	13	0.01%	163	0.13%	293	0.23%	43,494	33.89%	128,357
Cape May	6,385	43.54%	8,252	56.27%	11	0.08%	5	0.03%	11	0.08%	-1,867	-12.73%	14,664
Cumberland	15,674	51.87%	14,477	47.91%	7	0.02%	37	0.12%	23	0.08%	1,197	3.96%	30,218
Essex	174,320	48.32%	178,989	49.62%	6,276	1.74%	206	0.06%	951	0.26%	-4,669	-1.29%	360,742
Gloucester	17,758	51.39%	16,684	48.28%	3	0.01%	55	0.16%	55	0.16%	1,074	3.11%	34,555
Hudson	191,354	61.90%	117,087	37.88%	78	0.03%	357	0.12%	259	0.08%	74,267	24.02%	309,135
Hunterdon	6,774	40.68%	9,843	59.11%	8	0.05%	10	0.06%	17	0.10%	-3,069	-18.43%	16,652
Mercer	52,383	58.61%	36,844	41.23%	13	0.01%	19	0.02%	112	0.13%	15,539	17.39%	89,371
Middlesex	60,504	56.35%	45,232	42.12%	130	0.12%	1,332	1.24%	180	0.17%	15,272	14.22%	107,378
Monmouth	34,720	41.27%	49,349	58.66%	5	0.01%	6	0.01%	42	0.05%	-14,629	-17.39%	84,122
Morris	21,454	34.96%	39,732	64.74%	13	0.02%	21	0.03%	152	0.25%	-18,278	-29.78%	61,372
Ocean	7,683	36.53%	13,317	63.32%	2	0.01%	11	0.05%	19	0.09%	-5,634	-26.79%	21,032
Passaic	68,737	50.11%	67,856	49.46%	59	0.04%	275	0.20%	255	0.19%	881	0.64%	137,182
Salem	10,345	56.50%	7,942	43.38%	1	0.01%	10	0.05%	12	0.07%	2,403	13.12%	18,310
Somerset	14,467	41.61%	20,266	58.29%	2	0.01%	35	0.10%	0	0.00%	-5,799	-16.68%	34,770
Sussex	5,237	37.23%	8,817	62.68%	2	0.01%	10	0.07%	0	0.00%	-3,580	-25.45%	14,066
Union	75,969	46.15%	86,543	52.57%	114	0.07%	1,506	0.91%	493	0.30%	-10,574	-6.42%	164,625
Warren	10,024	48.30%	10,714	51.62%	2	0.01%	3	0.01%	11	0.05%	-690	-3.32%	20,754
Totals	987,874	50.31%	961,335	48.95%	6,939	0.35%	4,255	0.22%	3,358	0.17%	26,539	1.35%	1,963,761

==== Counties that flipped from Democratic to Republican ====
- Warren

== See also ==
- Presidency of Franklin D. Roosevelt
- Presidency of Harry S. Truman
- United States presidential elections in New Jersey
