= 1836 United States presidential election in New Jersey =

- November 3 – December 7, 1836
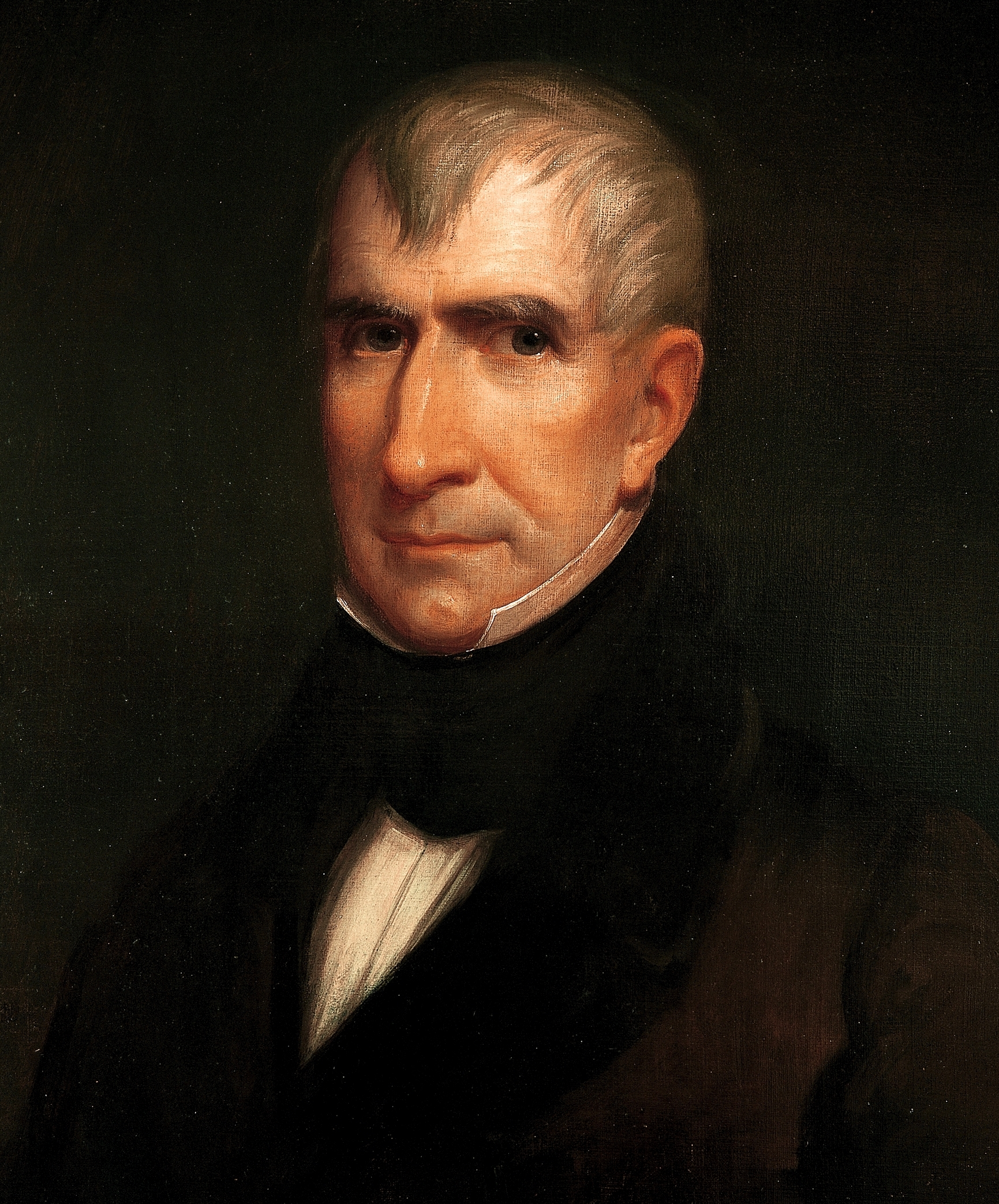

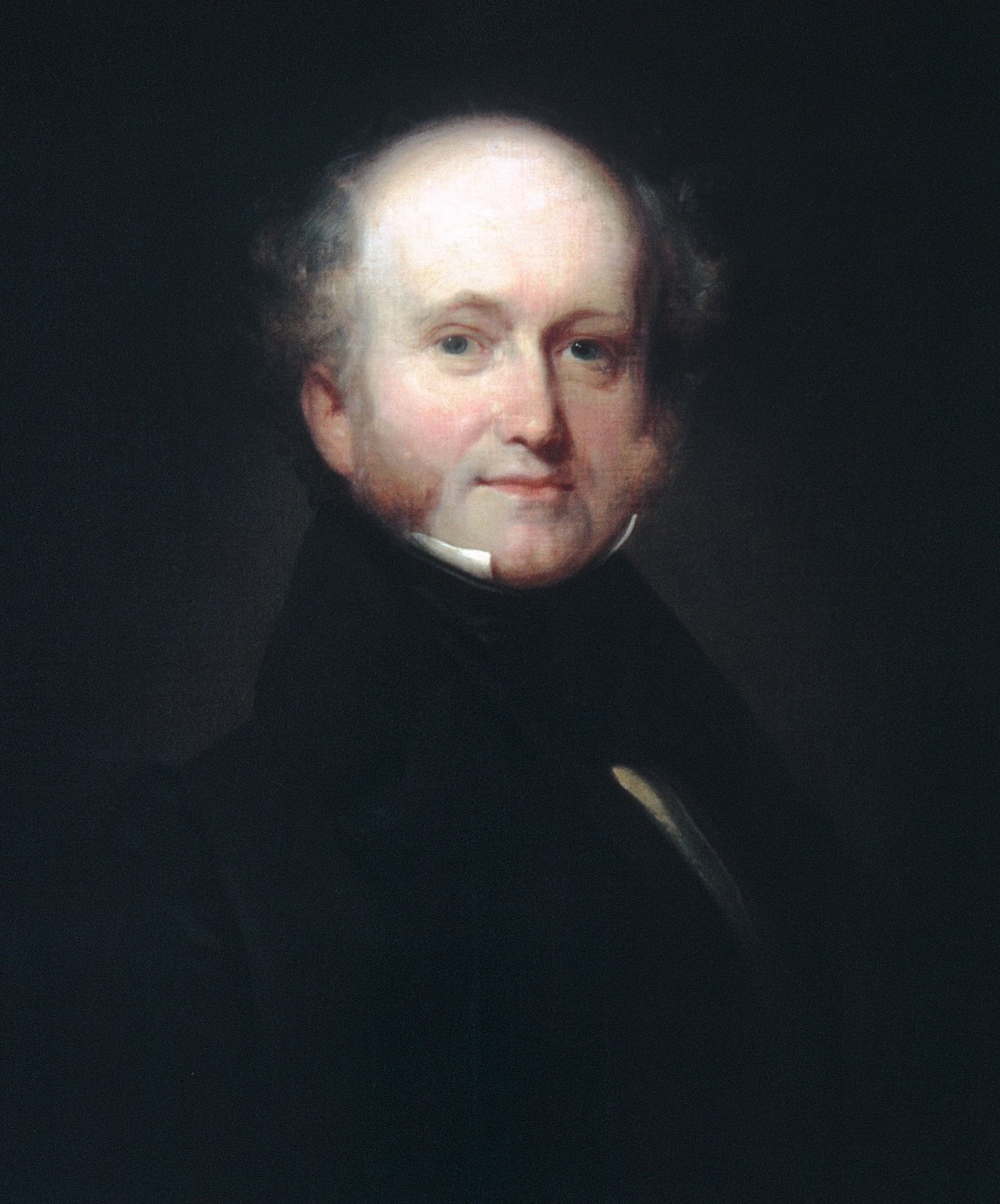
Nominee	William Henry Harrison	Martin Van Buren
Party	Whig	Democratic
Home state	Ohio	New York
Running mate	Francis Granger	Richard Mentor Johnson
Electoral vote	8	0
Popular vote	26,137	25,592
Percentage	50.53%	49.47%
County results
Harrison
50–60%
60–70%
Van Buren
50–60%
60–70%
70–80%
President before election
Andrew Jackson
Democratic
Elected President
Martin Van Buren
Democratic

The 1836 United States presidential election in New Jersey took place between November 3 and December 7, 1836, as part of the 1836 United States presidential election. Voters chose eight representatives, or electors to the Electoral College, who voted for President and Vice President.

New Jersey voted for the Whig candidate, William Henry Harrison, over Democratic candidate Martin Van Buren. Harrison won New Jersey by a narrow margin of 1.06%.

== Results ==
1836 United States presidential election in New Jersey
Party	Candidate	Running mate	Popular vote		Electoral vote	
Party	Candidate	Running mate	Count	%	Count	%
Whig	William Henry Harrison of Ohio	Francis Granger of New York	26,137	50.53%	8	100.00%
Democratic	Martin Van Buren of New York	Richard Mentor Johnson of Kentucky	25,592	49.47%	0	0.00%
Total			51,729	100.00%	8	100.00%

=== Results by county ===
1836 United States presidential election in New Jersey
County	William Henry Harrison Whig		Martin Van Buren Democratic		Margin		Total votes cast
	#	%	#	%	#	%	
Bergen	1,716	46.91%	1,942	53.09%	-226	-6.18%	3,658
Burlington	3,031	58.81%	2,123	41.19%	908	17.62%	5,154
Cape May	489	67.63%	234	32.37%	255	35.27%	723
Cumberland	1,193	54.57%	993	45.43%	200	9.15%	2,186
Essex	4,343	56.57%	3,334	43.43%	1,009	13.14%	7,677
Gloucester	2,377	51.90%	2,203	48.10%	174	3.80%	4,580
Hunterdon	2,114	47.37%	2,349	52.63%	-235	-5.27%	4,463
Middlesex	2,003	53.82%	1,719	46.18%	284	7.63%	3,722
Monmouth	2,349	47.96%	2,549	52.04%	-200	-4.08%	4,898
Morris	1,801	50.38%	1,774	49.62%	27	0.76%	3,575
Salem	1,334	56.29%	1,036	43.71%	298	12.57%	2,370
Somerset	1,436	51.67%	1,343	48.33%	93	3.35%	2,779
Sussex	910	27.58%	2,389	72.42%	-1,479	-44.83%	3,299
Warren	1,041	39.36%	1,604	60.64%	-563	-21.29%	2,645
Total:	26,137	50.53%	25,592	49.47%	545	1.05%	51,729

== See also ==
- United States presidential elections in New Jersey
