= 1940 United States presidential election in New Jersey =

- November 5, 1940
- Turnout: 85.52% (▲0.80%)

Nominee	Franklin D. Roosevelt	Wendell Willkie
Party	Democratic	Republican
Home state	New York	New York
Running mate	Henry A. Wallace	Charles L. McNary
Electoral vote	16	0
Popular vote	1,016,808	945,475
Percentage	51.55%	47.93%
County results
Roosevelt
50–60%
60–70%
Willkie
50–60%
60–70%
President before election
Franklin D. Roosevelt
Democratic
Elected President
Franklin D. Roosevelt
Democratic

The 1940 United States presidential election in New Jersey took place on November 5, 1940. All contemporary 48 states were part of the 1940 United States presidential election. Voters chose 16 electors to the Electoral College, which selected the president and vice president.

New Jersey was won by the Democratic nominees, incumbent President Franklin D. Roosevelt of New York and his running mate Secretary of Agriculture Henry A. Wallace of Iowa. Roosevelt and Wallace defeated the Republican nominees, corporate lawyer Wendell Willkie of New York and his running mate Senate Minority Leader Charles L. McNary of Oregon.

Roosevelt narrowly carried New Jersey with 51.55 percent of the vote to Willkie's 47.93 percent, a margin of 3.62 percent. Reflecting the closeness of the statewide result, Roosevelt and Willkie virtually split the state's 21 counties: Roosevelt won 11 counties to Willkie's ten. Roosevelt edged out Willkie statewide with decisive victories in some of the most heavily populated parts of the state, while keeping the results close in heavily populated counties that he lost.

In North Jersey, Roosevelt maintained his dominance in heavily populated Hudson County, part of the New York metropolitan area where the New Deal Coalition was very strong, breaking 60% of the vote in the county for the third election in a row. Roosevelt also won heavily populated Middlesex County with more than 60% of the vote, along with majorities in Mercer County, Passaic County, and rural Warren County. Willkie won the remaining counties of North Jersey, breaking sixty percent of the vote in Bergen County and Morris County.

Roosevelt performed much more strongly overall in South Jersey, winning majorities in 6 out of 8 of the southernmost counties in the state; his strongest county win there was urban Camden County, where he broke 60% of the vote. In South Jersey, Willkie won only rural Cape May County. Besides his victories in North Jersey, Willkie also won Monmouth County and Ocean County in the central portion of the state.

New Jersey by 1940 had become a closely divided swing state with a Republican lean, and its results in 1940 adhered to that pattern. Roosevelt had carried the state in the midst of both of his preceding nationwide landslides, although only by a very narrow margin in 1932. As Roosevelt decisively won re-election to an unprecedented third term, carrying 38 out of 48 states, his narrow margin of victory in New Jersey made the state about 6 points more Republican than the national average.

== Results ==
1940 United States presidential election in New Jersey
Party	Candidate	Votes	Percentage	Electoral votes
Democratic	Franklin D. Roosevelt (incumbent)	1,016,808	51.55%	16
Republican	Wendell Willkie	945,475	47.93%	0
Communist	Earl Browder	6,508	0.33%	0
Socialist	Norman Thomas	2,433	0.12%	0
National Prohibition	Roger Babson	873	0.04%	0
Socialist Labor	John W. Aiken	455	0.02%	0
Totals		1,974,214	100.0%	16

=== Results by county ===
County	Franklin D. Roosevelt Democratic		Wendell Willkie Republican		Earl Browder Communist		Norman Thomas Socialist		Roger Babson National Prohibition		John W. Aiken Socialist Labor		Margin		Total votes cast
County	#	%	#	%	#	%	#	%	#	%	#	%	#	%	Total votes cast
Atlantic	36,155	54.13%	30,551	45.74%	26	0.04%	33	0.05%	28	0.04%	5	0.01%	5,604	8.39%	66,798
Bergen	76,541	36.65%	131,588	63.01%	190	0.09%	379	0.18%	58	0.03%	67	0.03%	-55,047	-26.36%	208,823
Burlington	26,574	55.50%	21,161	44.20%	13	0.03%	71	0.15%	53	0.11%	6	0.01%	5,413	11.31%	47,878
Camden	84,837	65.81%	43,480	33.73%	93	0.07%	337	0.26%	158	0.12%	14	0.01%	41,357	32.08%	128,919
Cape May	8,485	47.29%	9,429	52.55%	4	0.02%	10	0.06%	16	0.09%	0	0.00%	-944	-5.26%	17,944
Cumberland	19,251	53.95%	16,322	45.75%	13	0.04%	23	0.06%	58	0.16%	13	0.04%	2,929	8.21%	35,680
Essex	154,363	44.87%	182,124	52.94%	6,556	1.91%	765	0.22%	139	0.04%	87	0.03%	-27,761	-8.07%	344,034
Gloucester	20,284	53.22%	17,674	46.38%	11	0.03%	51	0.13%	82	0.22%	9	0.02%	2,610	6.85%	38,111
Hudson	208,429	65.85%	107,552	33.98%	255	0.08%	237	0.07%	9	0.00%	26	0.01%	100,877	31.87%	316,508
Hunterdon	7,872	43.25%	10,284	56.50%	2	0.01%	27	0.15%	12	0.07%	6	0.03%	-2,412	-13.25%	18,203
Mercer	50,121	57.26%	37,190	42.49%	119	0.14%	85	0.10%	14	0.02%	4	0.00%	12,931	14.77%	87,533
Middlesex	67,140	61.59%	41,709	38.26%	69	0.06%	23	0.02%	6	0.01%	66	0.06%	25,431	23.33%	109,013
Monmouth	36,298	42.18%	49,675	57.73%	16	0.02%	29	0.03%	23	0.03%	6	0.01%	-13,377	-15.55%	86,047
Morris	24,698	38.23%	39,720	61.47%	25	0.04%	117	0.18%	47	0.07%	5	0.01%	-15,022	-23.25%	64,612
Ocean	8,762	39.50%	13,394	60.38%	18	0.08%	6	0.03%	2	0.01%	0	0.00%	-4,632	-20.88%	22,182
Passaic	69,880	51.42%	65,523	48.21%	231	0.17%	184	0.14%	31	0.02%	58	0.04%	4,357	3.21%	135,907
Salem	12,244	59.92%	8,132	39.80%	15	0.07%	16	0.08%	26	0.13%	0	0.00%	4,112	20.12%	20,433
Somerset	16,490	44.86%	20,169	54.87%	36	0.10%	40	0.11%	10	0.03%	10	0.03%	-3,679	-10.01%	36,755
Sussex	6,314	42.14%	8,642	57.67%	4	0.03%	7	0.05%	16	0.11%	1	0.01%	-2,328	-15.54%	14,984
Union	70,737	46.45%	79,962	52.50%	1,116	0.73%	369	0.24%	52	0.03%	60	0.04%	-9,225	-6.06%	152,296
Warren	10,929	50.69%	10,595	49.14%	8	0.04%	14	0.06%	12	0.06%	3	0.01%	334	1.55%	21,561
Totals	1,016,404	51.48%	944,876	47.86%	8,814	0.45%	2,823	0.14%	851	0.04%	446	0.02%	71,528	3.62%	1,974,214

==== Counties that flipped from Democratic to Republican ====
- Cape May
- Hunterdon
- Essex
- Bergen
- Somerset
- Union

== See also ==
- Presidency of Franklin D. Roosevelt
- United States presidential elections in New Jersey
