= 1824 United States presidential election in New Jersey =

- October 26 – December 2, 1824
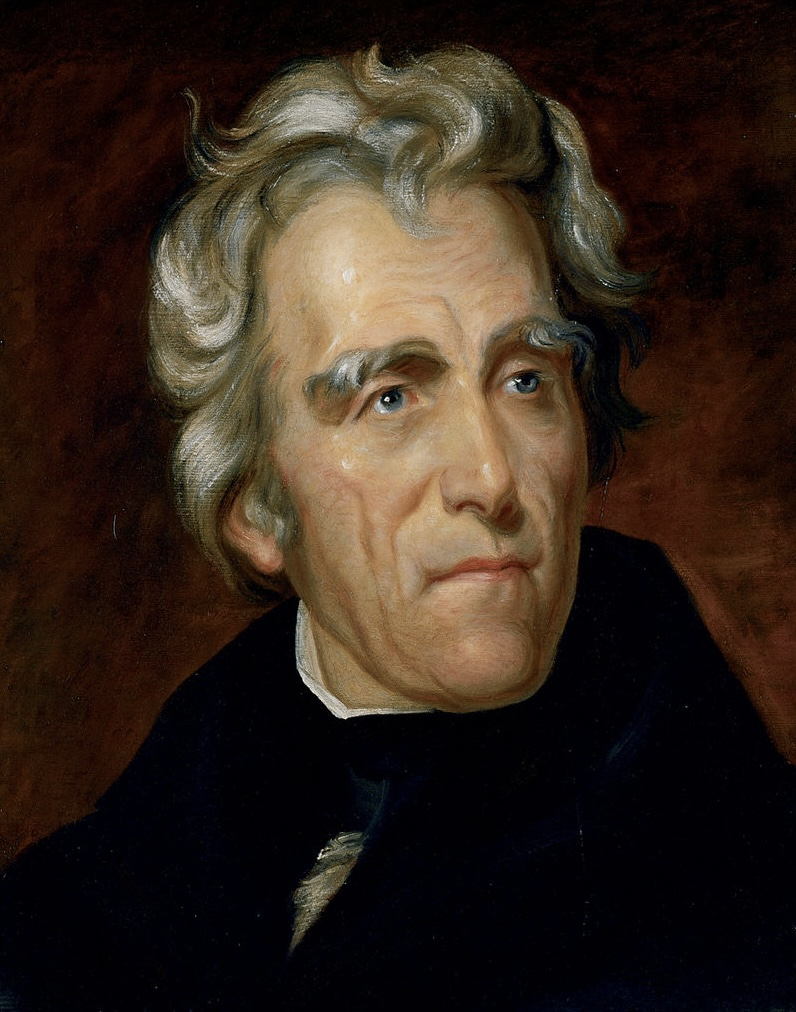

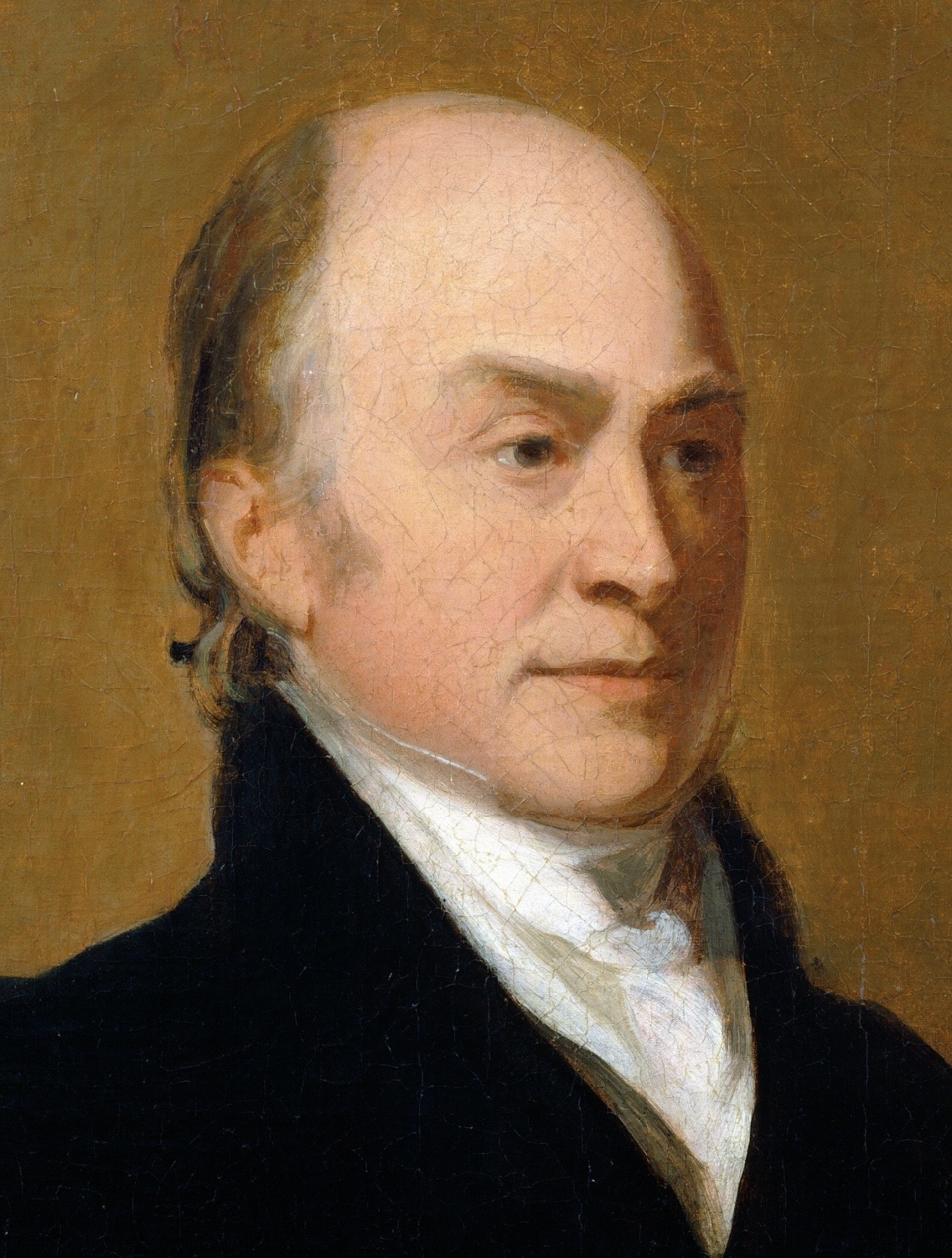

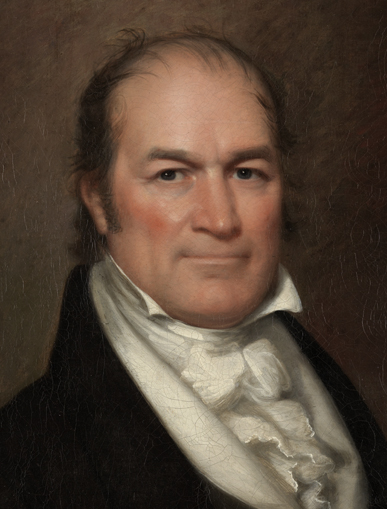
Nominee	Andrew Jackson	John Quincy Adams	William H. Crawford
Party	Democratic-Republican	Democratic-Republican	Democratic-Republican
Home state	Tennessee	Massachusetts	Georgia
Running mate	John C. Calhoun	John C. Calhoun	Nathaniel Macon
Electoral vote	8	0	0
Popular vote	10,332	8,309	1,196
Percentage	52.08%	41.89%	6.03%
County results
Jackson
40–50%
50–60%
60–70%
Adams
40–50%
50–60%
70–80%
President before election
James Monroe
Democratic-Republican
Elected President
John Quincy Adams
Democratic-Republican

The 1824 United States presidential election in New Jersey took place between October 26 and December 2, 1824, as part of the 1824 United States presidential election. Voters chose eight representatives, or electors to the Electoral College, who voted for President and Vice President.

During this election, the Democratic-Republican Party was the only major national party, and four different candidates from this party sought the Presidency. New Jersey voted for Andrew Jackson over John Quincy Adams, William H. Crawford, and Henry Clay. Jackson won New Jersey by over half of the vote.

== Results ==
1824 United States presidential election in New Jersey
Party	Candidate	Votes	Percentage	Electoral votes
Democratic-Republican	Andrew Jackson	10,332	52.08%	8
Democratic-Republican	John Quincy Adams	8,309	41.89%	0
Democratic-Republican	William H. Crawford	1,196	6.03%	0
Totals		19,837	100.0%	8

== See also ==
- United States presidential elections in New Jersey
