= 1960 United States presidential election in New Jersey =

New Jersey presidential election

- November 8, 1960
- Turnout: 91.06% (▲3.47%)

Nominee	John F. Kennedy	Richard Nixon
Party	Democratic	Republican
Home state	Massachusetts	California
Running mate	Lyndon B. Johnson	Henry Cabot Lodge Jr.
Electoral vote	16	0
Popular vote	1,385,415	1,363,324
Percentage	49.96%	49.16%
County results
Kennedy
50–60%
60–70%
Nixon
50–60%
60–70%
President before election
Dwight D. Eisenhower
Republican
Elected President
John F. Kennedy
Democratic

The 1960 United States presidential election in New Jersey took place on November 8, 1960. All 50 states were part of the 1960 United States presidential election. New Jersey voters chose 16 electors to the Electoral College, which selected the president and vice president.

New Jersey was won by the Democratic nominees, Senator John F. Kennedy of Massachusetts and his running mate Senate Majority Leader Lyndon B. Johnson of Texas. Kennedy and Johnson defeated the Republican nominees, Vice President Richard Nixon of California and his running mate Ambassador Henry Cabot Lodge Jr. of Massachusetts.

Kennedy carried New Jersey with 49.96% of the vote to Nixon's 49.16%, a margin of 0.8%. Kennedy managed to narrowly win the state despite winning only seven counties to Nixon's 14. However, Kennedy managed to rack up large margins decisively winning some of the most heavily populated counties in the state, while keeping the results very close in those heavily populated counties that he lost. As the first Roman Catholic nominee, from an urban Irish immigrant background, John Kennedy appealed strongly to working-class Catholics and other urban ethnic immigrant groups, who turned out in record numbers to support him. Thus Kennedy's support base was condensed into mostly heavily populated urban areas.

New Jersey in this era was usually a swing state with a slight Republican lean. But in 1960, excitement among the many Catholic and other ethnic immigrant communities that populated New Jersey's cities for the historic candidacy of John F. Kennedy led to record turnout to elect the first Catholic president, thus narrowly delivering the state to Kennedy. The Great Migration also helped Kennedy, who clearly won the state's African-American voters. As Kennedy eked out a razor-thin victory nationally to win the presidency, New Jersey voted basically how the nation voted. But under the unique circumstances that made Kennedy popular in Northeastern states, New Jersey's results in 1960 made it about .18% more Democratic than the national average. This was also the last election until fellow Democratic candidate from Massachusetts John Kerry did so in 2004, when a Northern Democrat won New Jersey, as the next three Democratic presidential candidates to carry the state were all from the South (Lyndon B. Johnson was from Texas, Bill Clinton from Arkansas, and Al Gore from Tennessee), even though New Jersey is a northern state. This was also the first time since 1904 that New Jersey voted more Democratic than the rest of the nation. This is the last time a Democrat won without Burlington, Gloucester, and Atlantic counties. This is the most recent election in which the statewide winning candidate did not carry Union County.

== Primaries ==
=== Democratic primary ===
No candidates ran in the Democratic primary. Unpledged at-large delegates were elected.

Governor Robert B. Meyner wanted to lead an unpledged state delegation to the convention to support him as a favorite son. Kennedy opted to allow him to do this, and therefore did not compete in New Jersey. Kennedy did so because he was confident that Meyner lacked national appeal, and thus, if convention voting went into multiple rounds, Kennedy would be able to secure the backing of New Jersey delegates after the first round.

=== Republican primary ===
No candidates ran in the Republican primary. Unpledged at-large delegates were elected.

== Results ==
1960 United States presidential election in New Jersey
Party	Candidate	Votes	Percentage	Electoral votes
Democratic	John F. Kennedy	1,385,415	49.96%	16
Republican	Richard Nixon	1,363,324	49.16%	0
Socialist Workers	Farrell Dobbs	11,402	0.41%	0
Conservative	J. Bracken Lee	8,708	0.31%	0
Socialist Labor	Eric Hass	4,262	0.15%	0
Totals		2,773,111	100.0%	16
Voter Turnout (Voting age/Registered)				71%/90%

=== Results by county ===
County	John F. Kennedy Democratic		Richard Nixon Republican		Various candidates Other parties		Margin		Total votes cast
County	#	%	#	%	#	%	#	%	Total votes cast
Atlantic	36,129	46.94%	39,158	50.88%	1,682	2.19%	-3,029	-3.94%	76,969
Bergen	156,165	40.90%	224,969	58.92%	674	0.18%	-68,804	-18.02%	381,808
Burlington	39,321	48.22%	42,112	51.65%	106	0.13%	-2,791	-3.43%	81,539
Camden	102,083	54.73%	84,066	45.07%	366	0.20%	18,017	9.66%	186,515
Cape May	10,137	38.66%	16,076	61.31%	9	0.03%	-5,939	-22.65%	26,222
Cumberland	23,199	52.12%	21,283	47.81%	30	0.07%	1,916	4.31%	44,512
Essex	217,878	55.35%	167,848	42.64%	7,897	2.01%	50,030	12.71%	393,623
Gloucester	29,752	47.79%	32,474	52.16%	33	0.05%	-2,722	-4.37%	62,259
Hudson	174,754	59.99%	113,972	39.13%	2,566	0.88%	60,782	20.86%	291,292
Hunterdon	8,863	35.84%	15,842	64.06%	26	0.11%	-6,979	-28.22%	24,731
Mercer	74,166	61.16%	46,924	38.69%	179	0.15%	27,242	22.47%	121,269
Middlesex	116,095	58.18%	83,025	41.60%	436	0.22%	33,070	16.58%	199,556
Monmouth	62,434	43.34%	81,382	56.49%	244	0.17%	-18,948	-13.15%	144,060
Morris	42,698	36.22%	75,039	63.66%	146	0.12%	-32,341	-27.44%	117,883
Ocean	20,113	38.75%	31,430	60.56%	355	0.68%	-11,317	-21.81%	51,898
Passaic	90,950	50.70%	80,853	45.07%	7,599	4.24%	10,097	5.63%	179,402
Salem	12,394	46.58%	14,192	53.34%	21	0.08%	-1,798	-6.76%	26,607
Somerset	28,489	43.92%	36,200	55.81%	174	0.27%	-7,711	-11.89%	64,863
Sussex	7,269	30.75%	16,362	69.21%	11	0.05%	-9,093	-38.46%	23,642
Union	119,986	48.97%	123,224	50.29%	1,798	0.73%	-3,238	-1.32%	245,008
Warren	12,540	42.58%	16,893	57.36%	20	0.07%	-4,353	-14.78%	29,453
Totals	1,385,415	49.96%	1,363,324	49.16%	24,372	0.88%	22,091	0.80%	2,773,111

==== Counties that flipped from Republican to Democratic ====
- Essex
- Hudson
- Mercer
- Middlesex
- Camden
- Passaic
- Cumberland

== Analysis ==
In urban Hudson County, home to Bayonne, Jersey City, and Hoboken, and part of the New York City area where Kennedy did very well, Kennedy won countywide by a decisive 60–39 margin. This represented a major shift from 1956, when Republican Dwight Eisenhower had won Hudson County by 20 points. In Mercer County, home to the state capital of Trenton, Kennedy received his largest share of the vote, winning 61–39.

Essex County, home to Newark, had long been Republican-leaning, last voting Democratic in 1936. However Kennedy won the heavily populated county by a decisive 55–42 margin, the start of a re-alignment of the county; by the end of the 1960s, Essex County would be the most Democratic county in New Jersey. Kennedy also won heavily populated Middlesex County by a 58–41 margin. In equally heavily populated Union County, Nixon won, but only by a razor-thin 50–49 margin. This is the last time that Union County voted for the statewide loser, the longest active bellwether streak in the state. In Passaic County, Kennedy won by a 51–45 margin. In Camden County, Kennedy won 55–45.

Nixon was able to keep the race close statewide by winning several fairly populated suburban counties, like Monmouth County and Morris County, along with many rural counties; overall his biggest prize was heavily populated Bergen County, which went to Nixon by a 59–41 margin. Nixon's strongest county by vote share was rural Sussex County, where he received 69% of the vote to Kennedy's 31%.

== See also ==
- United States presidential elections in New Jersey
- Presidency of John F. Kennedy
- Presidency of Lyndon B. Johnson
