= 1868 United States presidential election in New Jersey =

- November 3, 1868
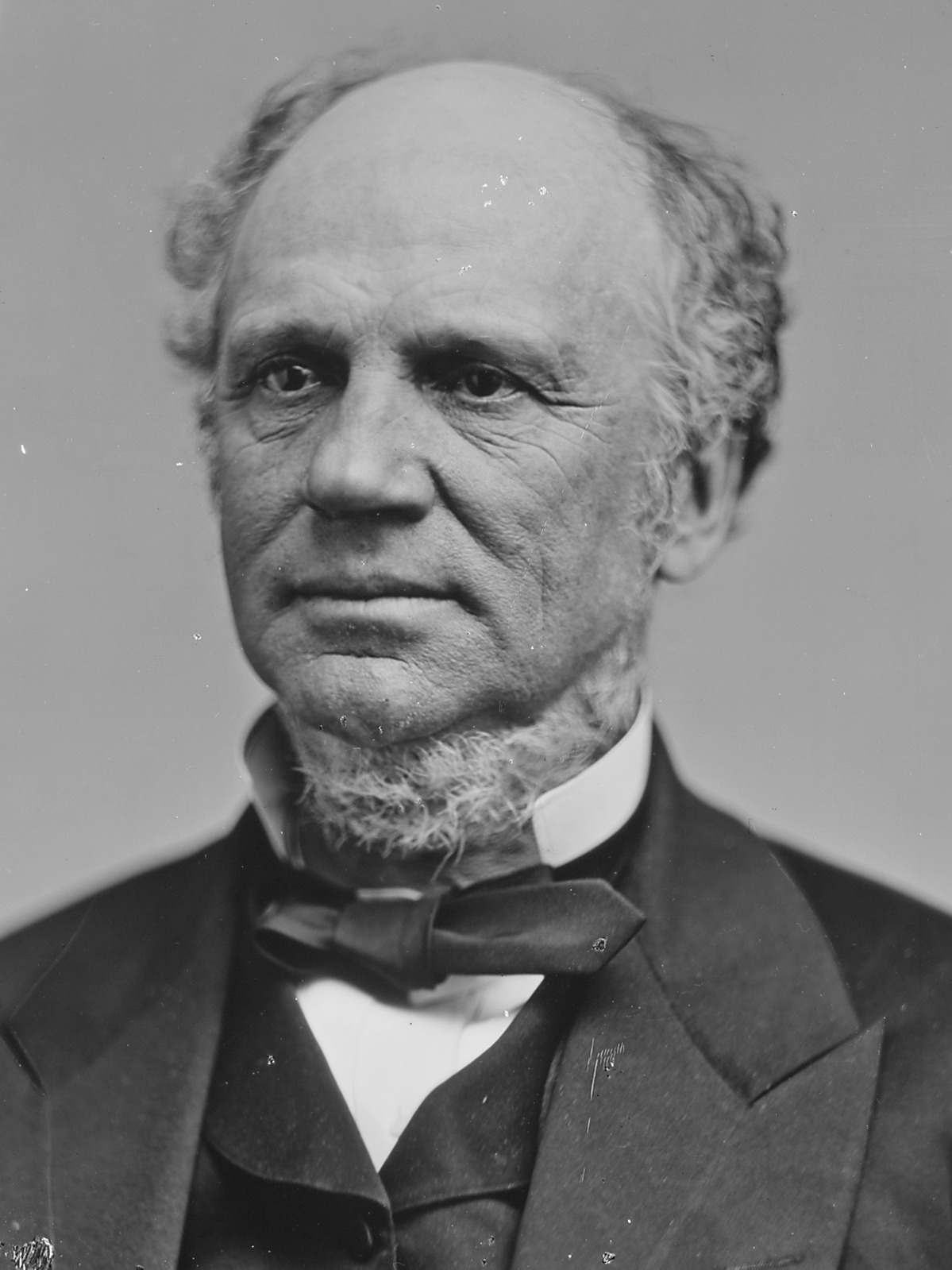

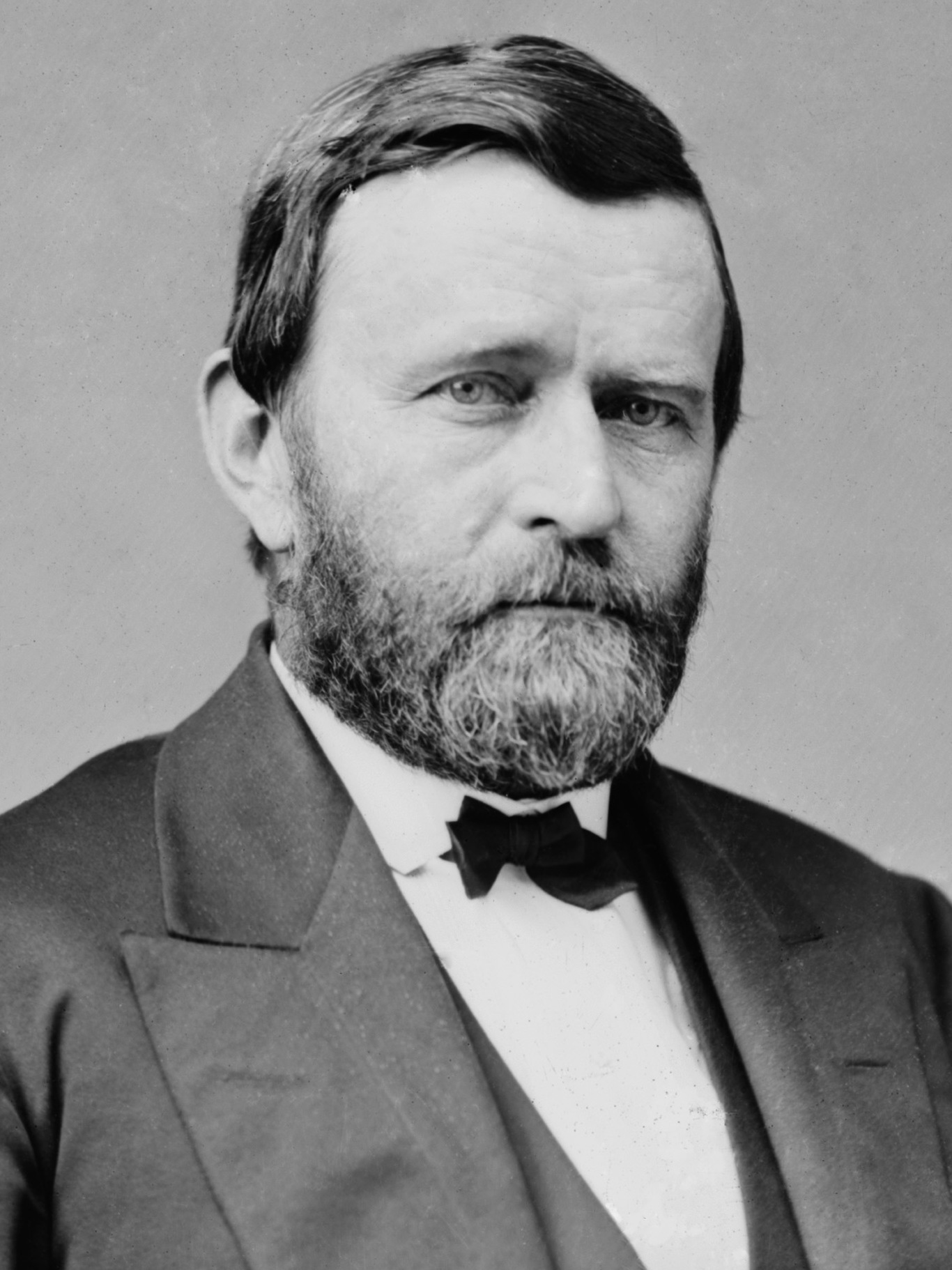
Nominee	Horatio Seymour	Ulysses S. Grant
Party	Democratic	Republican
Home state	New York	Illinois
Running mate	Francis Preston Blair Jr.	Schuyler Colfax
Electoral vote	7	0
Popular vote	83,001	80,131
Percentage	50.88%	49.12%
County results
Seymour
50–60%
60–70%
Grant
50–60%
60–70%
President before election
Andrew Johnson
Democratic
Elected President
Ulysses S. Grant
Republican

The 1868 United States presidential election in New Jersey took place on November 3, 1868, as part of the 1868 United States presidential election. Voters chose seven representatives, or electors to the Electoral College, who voted for president and vice president.

New Jersey voted for the Democratic nominee, former Governor of New York Horatio Seymour, over the Republican nominee, General Ulysses S. Grant. Seymour won by a narrow margin of 1.76%.

== Results ==
1868 United States presidential election in New Jersey
Party	Candidate	Running mate	Popular vote		Electoral vote	
Party	Candidate	Running mate	Count	%	Count	%
Democratic	Horatio Seymour of New York	Francis Preston Blair Jr. of Missouri	83,001	50.88%	7	100.00%
Republican	Ulysses S. Grant of Illinois	Schuyler Colfax of Indiana	80,131	49.12%	0	0.00%
Total			163,132	100.00%	7	100.00%

== See also ==
- United States presidential elections in New Jersey
