= United States presidential elections in New Jersey =

Presidential elections in New Jersey
- Number of elections: 60
- Voted Democratic: 27
- Voted Republican: 19
- Voted Whig: 4
- Voted Democratic-Republican: 5
- Voted Federalist: 3
- Voted other: 2 (Note: George Washington, 1788-89, 1792.)
- Voted for winning candidate: 43
- Voted for losing candidate: 17

Following is a table of United States presidential elections in New Jersey, ordered by year. Since its admission to statehood in 1787, New Jersey has participated in every U.S. presidential election.

Winners of the state are in bold. The shading refers to the state winner, and not the national winner.

== Elections from 1864 to present ==
View source data.

Year	Winner (nationally)	Votes	Percent	Runner-up (nationally)	Votes	Percent	Other national candidates (Note: For purposes of these lists, other national candidates are defined as those who won at least one electoral vote, or won at least ten percent of the vote in multiple states.)	Votes	Percent	Electoral votes	Notes
2024	Donald Trump	1,968,215	46.06	**Kamala Harris**	2,220,713	51.97	—			14	
2020	**Joe Biden**	2,608,335	57.14	Donald Trump	1,883,274	41.26	—			14	
2016	Donald Trump (Note: Won the electoral college while losing the popular vote)	1,601,933	41.00	**Hillary Clinton**	2,148,278	54.77	-			14	
2012	**Barack Obama**	2,125,101	58.38	Mitt Romney	1,477,568	40.59	-			14	
2008	**Barack Obama**	2,215,422	57.27	John McCain	1,613,207	41.70	-			15	
2004	George W. Bush	1,670,003	46.24	**John Kerry**	1,911,430	52.92	-			15	
2000	George W. Bush	1,284,173	40.29	**Al Gore**	1,788,850	56.13	-			15	
1996	**Bill Clinton**	1,652,329	53.72	Bob Dole	1,103,078	35.86	Ross Perot	262,134	8.52	15	
1992	**Bill Clinton**	1,436,206	42.95	George H. W. Bush	1,356,865	40.58	Ross Perot	521,829	15.61	15	
1988	**George H. W. Bush**	1,743,192	56.24	Michael Dukakis	1,320,352	42.60	-			16	
1984	**Ronald Reagan**	1,933,630	60.09	Walter Mondale	1,261,323	39.20	-			16	
1980	**Ronald Reagan**	1,546,557	51.97	Jimmy Carter	1,147,364	38.56	John B. Anderson	234,632	7.88	17	
1976	Jimmy Carter	1,444,653	47.92	**Gerald Ford**	1,509,688	50.08	-			17	
1972	**Richard Nixon**	1,845,502	61.57	George McGovern	1,102,211	36.77	-			17	
1968	**Richard Nixon**	1,325,467	46.10	Hubert Humphrey	1,264,206	43.97	George Wallace	262,187	9.12	17	
1964	**Lyndon B. Johnson**	1,867,671	65.61	Barry Goldwater	963,843	33.86	-			17	
1960	**John F. Kennedy**	1,385,415	49.96	Richard Nixon	1,363,324	49.16	-			16	
1956	**Dwight D. Eisenhower**	1,606,942	64.68	Adlai Stevenson II	850,337	34.23	T. Coleman Andrews/ Unpledged Electors (Note: Was allied with a slate of unpledged electors in Louisiana, Mississippi and South Carolina)	5,317	0.21	16	
1952	**Dwight D. Eisenhower**	1,374,613	56.81	Adlai Stevenson II	1,015,902	41.99	-			16	
1948	Harry S. Truman	895,455	45.93	**Thomas E. Dewey**	981,124	50.33	Strom Thurmond	-		16	
1944	**Franklin D. Roosevelt**	987,874	50.31	Thomas E. Dewey	961,335	48.95	-			16	
1940	**Franklin D. Roosevelt**	1,016,404	51.48	Wendell Willkie	944,876	47.86	-			16	
1936	**Franklin D. Roosevelt**	1,083,850	59.54	Alf Landon	720,322	39.57	-			16	
1932	**Franklin D. Roosevelt**	806,394	49.49	Herbert Hoover	775,406	47.59	-			16	
1928	**Herbert Hoover**	925,285	59.77	Al Smith	616,162	39.80	-			14	
1924	**Calvin Coolidge**	675,162	62.17	John W. Davis	297,743	27.41	Robert M. La Follette	108,901	10.03	14	
1920	**Warren G. Harding**	611,541	67.65	James M. Cox	256,887	28.42	Parley P. Christensen	2,200	0.24	14	
1916	Woodrow Wilson	211,018	42.68	**Charles E. Hughes**	268,982	54.40	-			14	
1912	**Woodrow Wilson**	178,289	41.20	Theodore Roosevelt	145,410	33.60	William H. Taft	88,835	20.53	14	
1908	**William H. Taft**	265,298	56.80	William Jennings Bryan	182,522	39.07	-			12	
1904	**Theodore Roosevelt**	245,164	56.68	Alton B. Parker	164,566	38.05	-			12	
1900	**William McKinley**	221,707	55.28	William Jennings Bryan	164,808	41.09	-			10	
1896	**William McKinley**	221,535	59.68	William Jennings Bryan	133,695	36.02	-			10	
1892	**Grover Cleveland**	171,066	50.67	Benjamin Harrison	156,101	46.24	James B. Weaver	985	0.29	10	
1888	Benjamin Harrison	144,360	47.52	**Grover Cleveland**	151,508	49.87	-			9	
1884	**Grover Cleveland**	127,798	48.98	James G. Blaine	123,440	47.31	-			9	
1880	James A. Garfield	120,555	49.02	**Winfield S. Hancock**	122,565	49.84	James B. Weaver	2,617	1.06	9	
1876	Rutherford B. Hayes	103,517	47.01	**Samuel J. Tilden**	115,962	52.66	-			9	
1872	**Ulysses S. Grant**	91,656	54.52	Horace Greeley	76,456	45.48	-			9	
1868	Ulysses S. Grant	80,132	49.1	**Horatio Seymour**	83,001	50.9	-			7	
1864	Abraham Lincoln	60,724	47.2	**George B. McClellan**	68,020	52.8	-			7	

== Election of 1860 ==
The election of 1860 was a complex realigning election in which the breakdown of the previous two-party alignment culminated in four parties each competing for influence in different parts of the country. The result of the election, with the victory of an ardent opponent of slavery, spurred the secession of eleven states and brought about the American Civil War.

New Jersey’s electoral vote was split, with four of the electors pledged to Lincoln being elected because the alternative, a fusion ticket of electors supporting other candidates, saw the Breckinridge and Bell electors finish behind all other candidates. and three Douglas electors being elected.

Year	Winner (nationally)	Votes	Percent	Runner-up (nationally)	Votes	Percent	Runner-up (nationally)	Votes	Percent	Runner-up (nationally)	Votes	Percent	Electoral votes
1860	**Abraham Lincoln**	58,346	48.1	Stephen A. Douglas	no ballots		John C. Breckinridge	no ballots		John Bell	no ballots		7

== Elections from 1828 to 1856 ==
Year	Winner (nationally)	Votes	Percent	Runner-up (nationally)	Votes	Percent	Other national candidates	Votes	Percent	Electoral votes	Notes
1856	**James Buchanan**	46,943	47.23	John C. Frémont	28,338	28.51	Millard Fillmore	24,115	24.26	7	
1852	**Franklin Pierce**	44,305	53.24	Winfield Scott	38,556	46.33	John P. Hale	359	0.43	7	
1848	**Zachary Taylor**	40,015	51.48	Lewis Cass	36,901	47.47	Martin Van Buren	819	1.05	7	
1844	James K. Polk	37,495	49.37	**Henry Clay**	38,318	50.46	-			7	
1840	**William Henry Harrison**	33,351	51.74	Martin Van Buren	31,034	48.15	-			8	
1836	Martin Van Buren	25,592	49.47	**William Henry Harrison**	26,137	50.53	various (Note: Three other candidates ran and received electoral votes nationally as part of the unsuccessful Whig strategy to defeat Martin Van Buren by running four candidates with local appeal in different regions of the country. The others were Hugh Lawson White, Daniel Webster, and Willie Person Mangum. None of these candidates appeared on the ballot in New Jersey.)			8	
1832	**Andrew Jackson**	23,826	49.89	Henry Clay	23,466	49.13	William Wirt	468	0.98	8	
1828	Andrew Jackson	21,809	47.86	**John Quincy Adams**	23,753	52.12	-			8	

== Election of 1824 ==
The election of 1824 was a complex realigning election following the collapse of the prevailing Democratic-Republican Party, resulting in four different candidates each claiming to carry the banner of the party, and competing for influence in different parts of the country. The election was the only one in history to be decided by the House of Representatives under the provisions of the Twelfth Amendment to the United States Constitution after no candidate secured a majority of the electoral vote. It was also the only presidential election in which the candidate who received a plurality of electoral votes (Andrew Jackson) did not become president, a source of great bitterness for Jackson and his supporters, who proclaimed the election of Adams a corrupt bargain.

Year	Winner (nationally)	Votes	Percent	Runner-up (nationally)	Votes	Percent	Runner-up (nationally)	Votes	Percent	Runner-up (nationally)	Votes	Percent	Electoral votes
1824	**Andrew Jackson**	10,332	52.08	John Quincy Adams	8,309	41.89	Henry Clay	no ballots		William H. Crawford	1,196	6.03	8

== Elections from 1788-89 to 1820 ==
In the election of 1820, incumbent President James Monroe ran effectively unopposed, winning all 8 of New Jersey's electoral votes, and all electoral votes nationwide except one vote in New Hampshire. To the extent that a popular vote was held, it was primarily directed to filling the office of vice president.

Year	Winner (nationally)	Runner-up (nationally)	Electoral votes	Notes
1820	**James Monroe**	-	8	Monroe effectively ran unopposed.
1816	**James Monroe**	Rufus King	8	
1812	James Madison	**DeWitt Clinton**	8	Legislature chose electors
1808	**James Madison**	Charles C. Pinckney	8	
1804	**Thomas Jefferson**	Charles C. Pinckney	8	
1800	Thomas Jefferson	**John Adams**	7	Legislature chose electors
1796	**John Adams**	Thomas Jefferson	7	
1792	**George Washington**	-	7	Washington effectively ran unopposed.
1788-89	**George Washington**	-	6	Washington effectively ran unopposed.

== See also ==
- Elections in New Jersey
