= 1848 United States presidential election in New Jersey =

- November 7, 1848
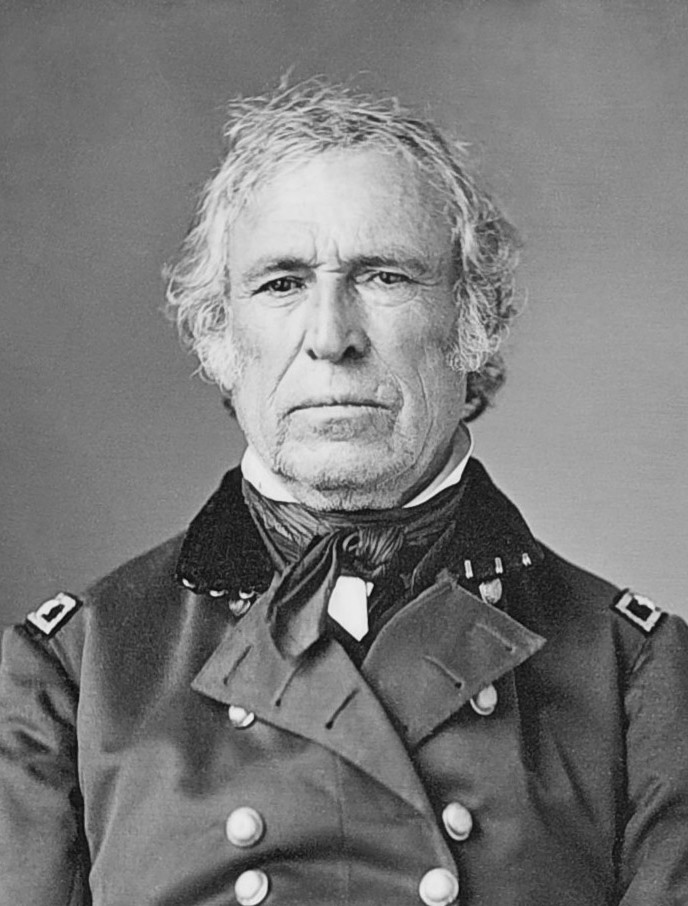

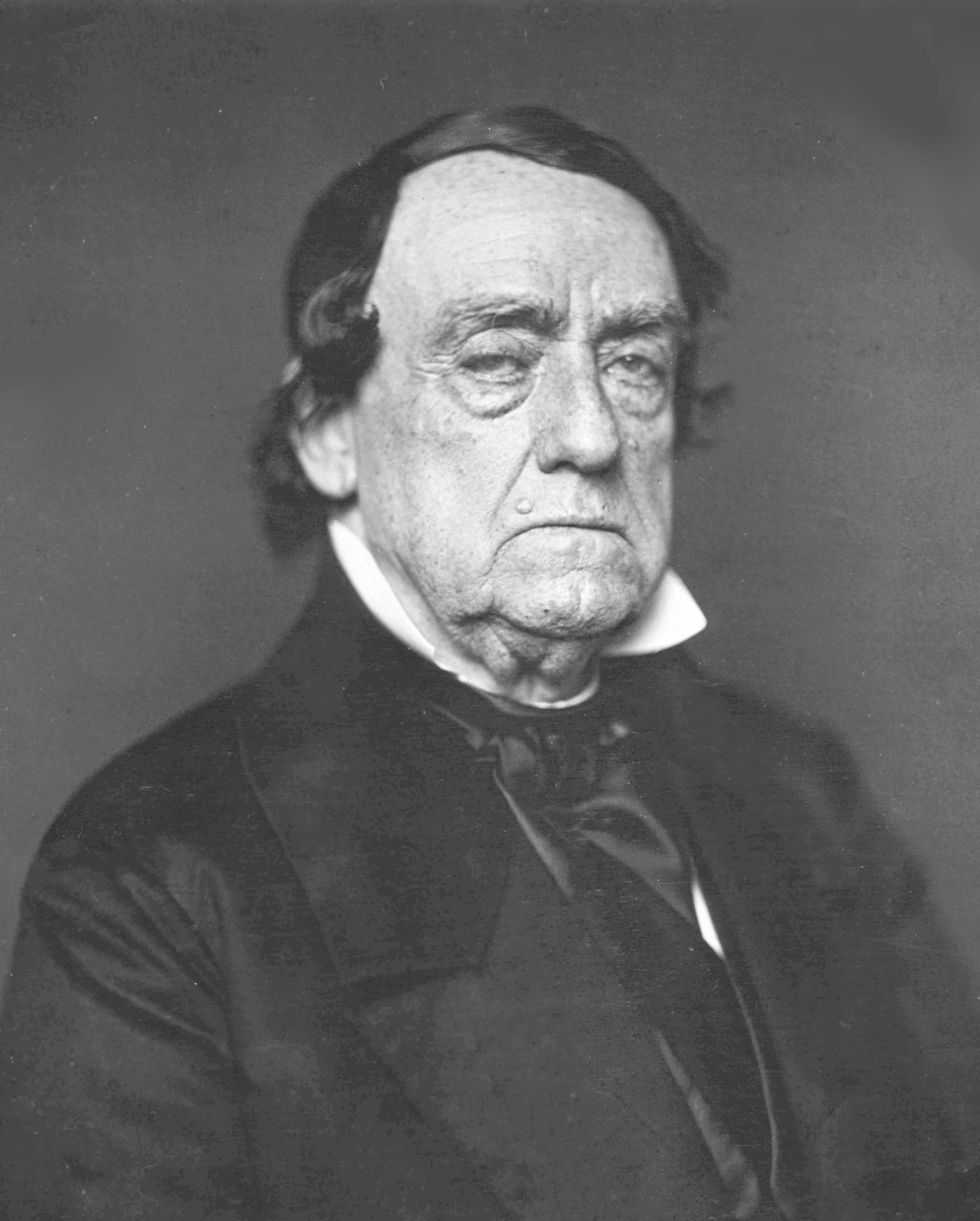
Nominee	Zachary Taylor	Lewis Cass
Party	Whig	Democratic
Home state	Louisiana	Michigan
Running mate	Millard Fillmore	William O. Butler
Electoral vote	7	0
Popular vote	40,015	36,901
Percentage	51.48%	47.47%
County results
Taylor
50–60%
60–70%
70–80%
Cass
50–60%
60–70%
70–80%
President before election
James K. Polk
Democratic
Elected President
Zachary Taylor
Whig

The 1848 United States presidential election in New Jersey took place on November 7, 1848, as part of the 1848 United States presidential election. Voters chose seven representatives, or electors to the Electoral College, who voted for President and Vice President.

New Jersey voted for the Whig candidate, Zachary Taylor, over Democratic candidate Lewis Cass and Free Soil candidate former president Martin Van Buren. Taylor won the state by a narrow margin of 4.01%.

== Results ==
1848 United States presidential election in New Jersey
Party	Candidate	Running mate	Popular vote		Electoral vote	
Party	Candidate	Running mate	Count	%	Count	%
Whig	Zachary Taylor of Louisiana	Millard Fillmore of New York	40,015	51.48%	7	100.00%
Democratic	Lewis Cass of Michigan	William O. Butler of Kentucky	36,901	47.47%	0	0.00%
Free Soil	Martin Van Buren of New York	Charles Francis Adams Sr. of Massachusetts	819	1.05%	0	0.00%
Total			77,735	100.00%	7	100.00%

== See also ==
- United States presidential elections in New Jersey
