= 1828 United States presidential election in New Jersey =

- October 31 – December 2, 1828
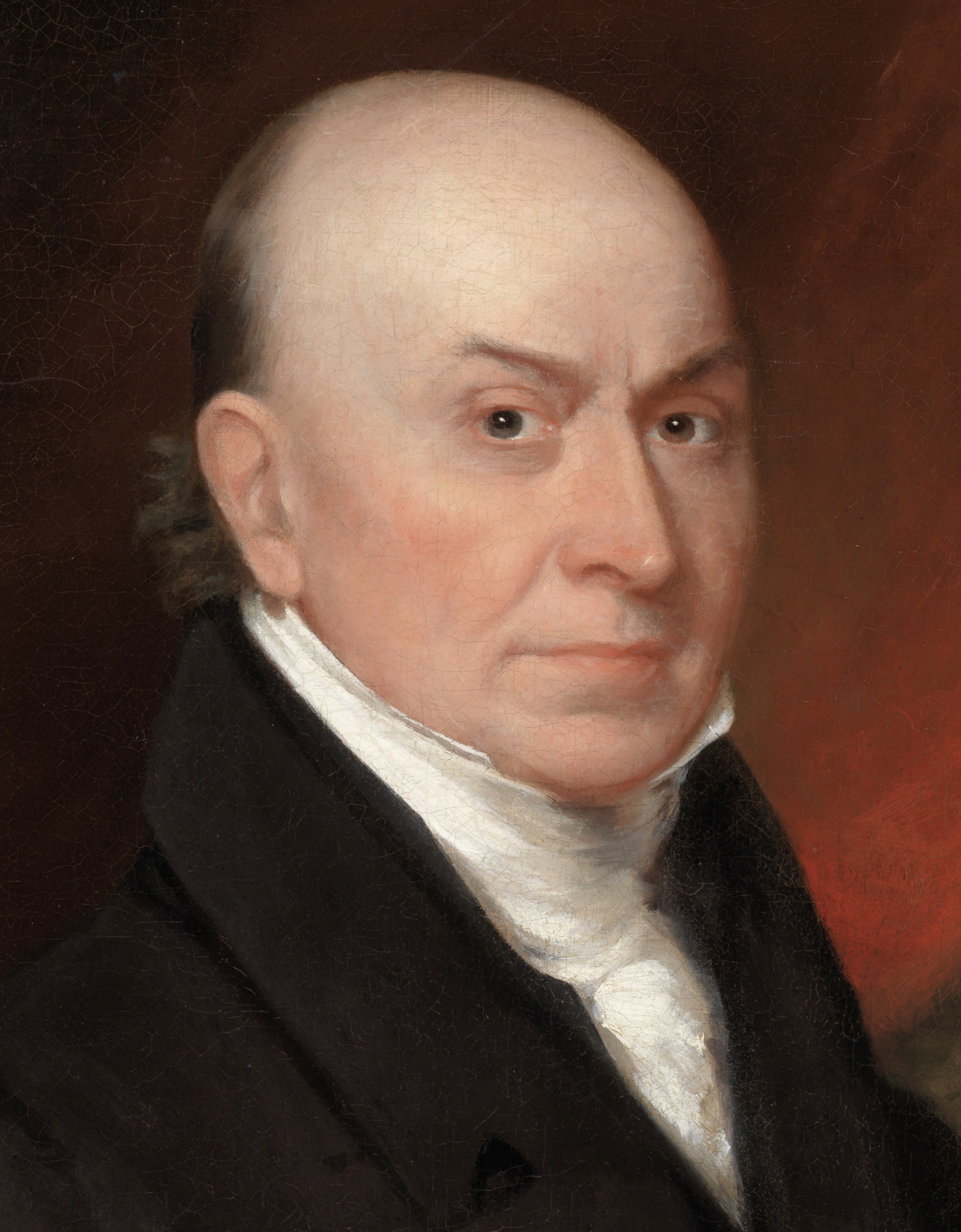

Nominee	John Quincy Adams	Andrew Jackson
Party	National Republican	Democratic
Home state	Massachusetts	Tennessee
Running mate	Richard Rush	John C. Calhoun
Electoral vote	8	0
Popular vote	23,753	21,809
Percentage	52.12%	47.86%
County results
Adams
50–60%
60–70%
70–80%
Jackson
50–60%
60–70%
70–80%
President before election
John Quincy Adams
National Republican
Elected President
Andrew Jackson
Democratic

The 1828 United States presidential election in New Jersey took place between October 31 and December 2, 1828, as part of the 1828 United States presidential election. Voters chose eight representatives, or electors to the Electoral College, who voted for President and Vice President.

New Jersey voted for the National Republican candidate, John Quincy Adams, over the Democratic candidate, Andrew Jackson. Adams won New Jersey by a narrow margin of 4.26%.

== Results ==
1828 United States presidential election in New Jersey
Party	Candidate	Votes	Percentage	Electoral votes
National Republican	John Quincy Adams (incumbent)	23,753	52.12%	8
Democratic	Andrew Jackson	21,809	47.86%	0
N/A	Other	8	0.02%	0
Totals		45,570	100.0%	8

== See also ==
- United States presidential elections in New Jersey
