= 1880 United States presidential election in New Jersey =

- November 2, 1880
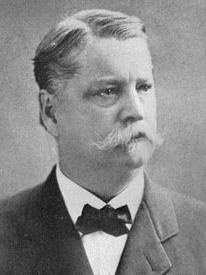

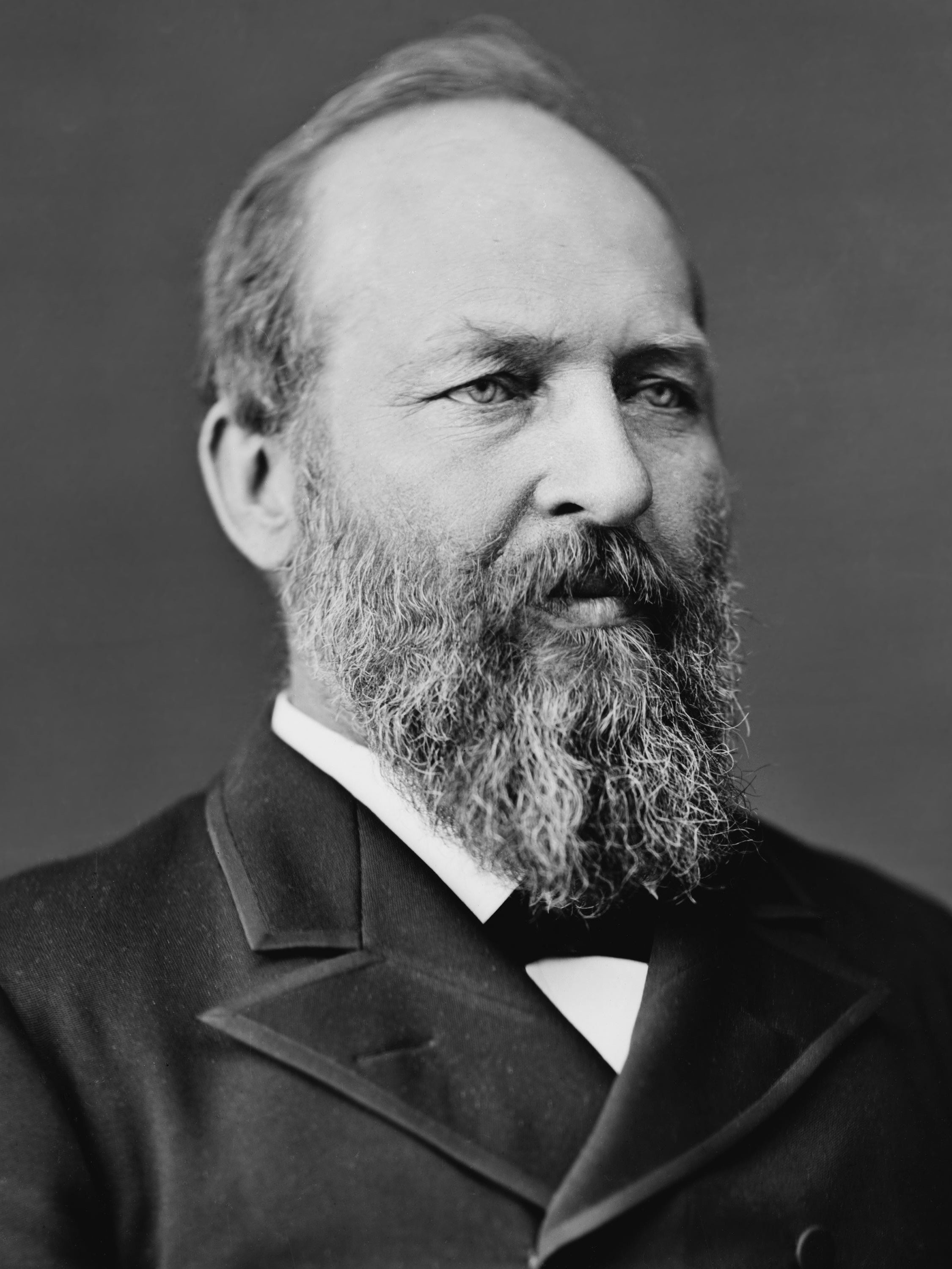
Nominee	Winfield Scott Hancock	James A. Garfield
Party	Democratic	Republican
Home state	Pennsylvania	Ohio
Running mate	William Hayden English	Chester A. Arthur
Electoral vote	9	0
Popular vote	122,565	120,555
Percentage	49.84%	49.02%
County results
Hancock
50–60%
60–70%
Garfield
50–60%
President before election
Rutherford B. Hayes
Republican
Elected President
James A. Garfield
Republican

The 1880 United States presidential election in New Jersey took place on November 2, 1880, as part of the 1880 United States presidential election. Voters chose nine representatives, or electors to the Electoral College, who voted for president and vice president.

New Jersey voted for the Democratic nominee, Winfield Scott Hancock, over the Republican nominee, James A. Garfield. Hancock won the state by a very narrow margin of 0.82 percentage points.

This was the last time until 2004 that a Republican candidate would win the national popular vote without New Jersey.

== Results ==
1880 United States presidential election in New Jersey
Party	Candidate	Running mate	Popular vote		Electoral vote	
Party	Candidate	Running mate	Count	%	Count	%
Democratic	Winfield Scott Hancock of Pennsylvania	William Hayden English of Indiana	122,565	49.84%	9	100.00%
Republican	James Abram Garfield of Ohio	Chester Alan Arthur of New York	120,555	49.02%	0	0.00%
Greenback	James Baird Weaver of Iowa	Barzillai Jefferson Chambers of Texas	2,617	1.06%	0	0.00%
Prohibition	Neal Dow of Maine	Henry Adams Thompson of Ohio	191	0.08%	0	0.00%
Total			245,928	100.00%	9	100.00%

=== Results by county ===
County	Winfield Scott Hancock Democratic		James Abram Garfield Republican		James Baird Weaver Greenback		Neal Dow Prohibition		Margin		Total votes cast
County	#	%	#	%	#	%	#	%	#	%	Total votes cast
Atlantic	1,720	40.46%	2,488	58.53%	43	1.01%	0	0.00%	-768	-18.07%	4,251
Bergen	4,242	53.41%	3,680	46.34%	20	0.25%	0	0.00%	562	7.08%	7,942
Burlington	6,543	47.64%	7,010	51.04%	154	1.12%	27	0.20%	-467	-3.40%	13,734
Camden	5,832	42.25%	7,895	57.20%	57	0.41%	19	0.14%	-2,063	-14.95%	13,803
Cape May	961	42.15%	1,276	55.96%	3	0.13%	40	1.75%	-315	-13.82%	2,280
Cumberland	3,640	42.31%	4,446	51.67%	514	5.97%	4	0.05%	-806	-9.37%	8,604
Essex	17,795	45.66%	20,707	53.13%	466	1.20%	4	0.01%	-2,912	-7.47%	38,972
Gloucester	2,658	42.97%	3,345	54.07%	177	2.86%	6	0.10%	-687	-11.11%	6,186
Hudson	19,586	56.98%	14,632	42.57%	153	0.45%	1	0.00%	4,954	14.41%	34,372
Hunterdon	5,650	58.69%	3,753	38.98%	171	1.78%	53	0.55%	1,897	19.70%	9,627
Mercer	6,673	47.78%	7,248	51.90%	39	0.28%	5	0.04%	-575	-4.12%	13,965
Middlesex	6,557	54.45%	5,420	45.01%	64	0.53%	1	0.01%	1,137	9.44%	12,042
Monmouth	7,614	56.94%	5,693	42.58%	47	0.35%	17	0.13%	1,921	14.37%	13,371
Morris	5,037	46.18%	5,720	52.44%	145	1.33%	5	0.05%	-683	-6.26%	10,907
Ocean	1,654	45.89%	1,898	52.66%	52	1.44%	0	0.00%	-244	-6.77%	3,604
Passaic	5,776	43.01%	7,576	56.42%	72	0.54%	4	0.03%	-1,800	-13.40%	13,428
Salem	3,012	48.09%	3,155	50.38%	66	1.05%	30	0.48%	-143	-2.28%	6,263
Somerset	3,157	49.21%	3,217	50.14%	41	0.64%	1	0.02%	-60	-0.94%	6,416
Sussex	3,353	56.91%	2,519	42.75%	20	0.34%	0	0.00%	834	14.15%	5,892
Union	5,865	50.03%	5,746	49.01%	108	0.92%	4	0.03%	119	1.02%	11,723
Warren	5,240	61.04%	3,131	36.47%	205	2.39%	9	0.10%	2,109	24.57%	8,585
Totals	122,565	49.83%	120,555	49.01%	2,617	1.06%	230	0.09%	2,010	0.82%	245,967

== See also ==
- United States presidential elections in New Jersey
