= 1832 United States presidential election in New Jersey =

- November 2 – December 5, 1832
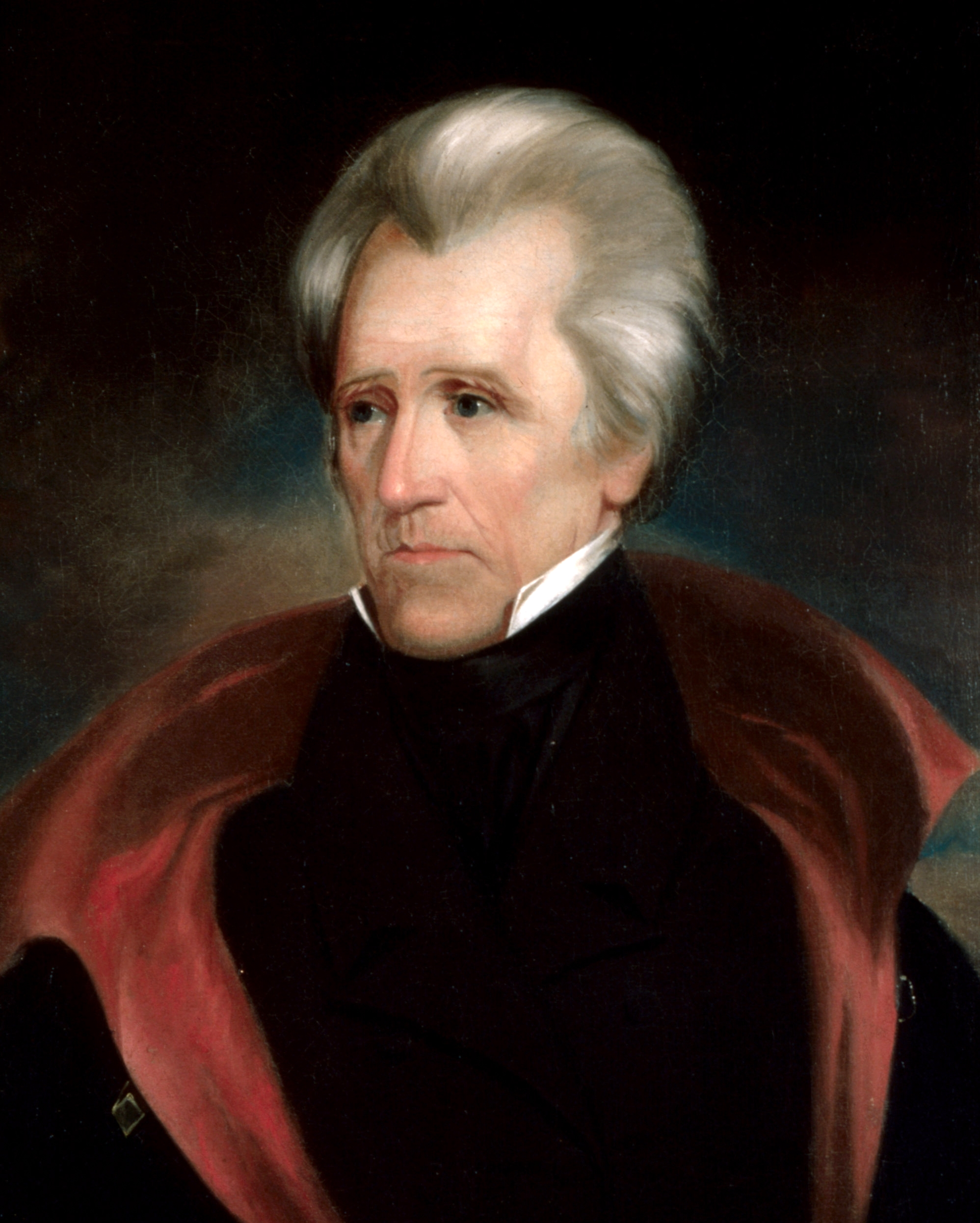

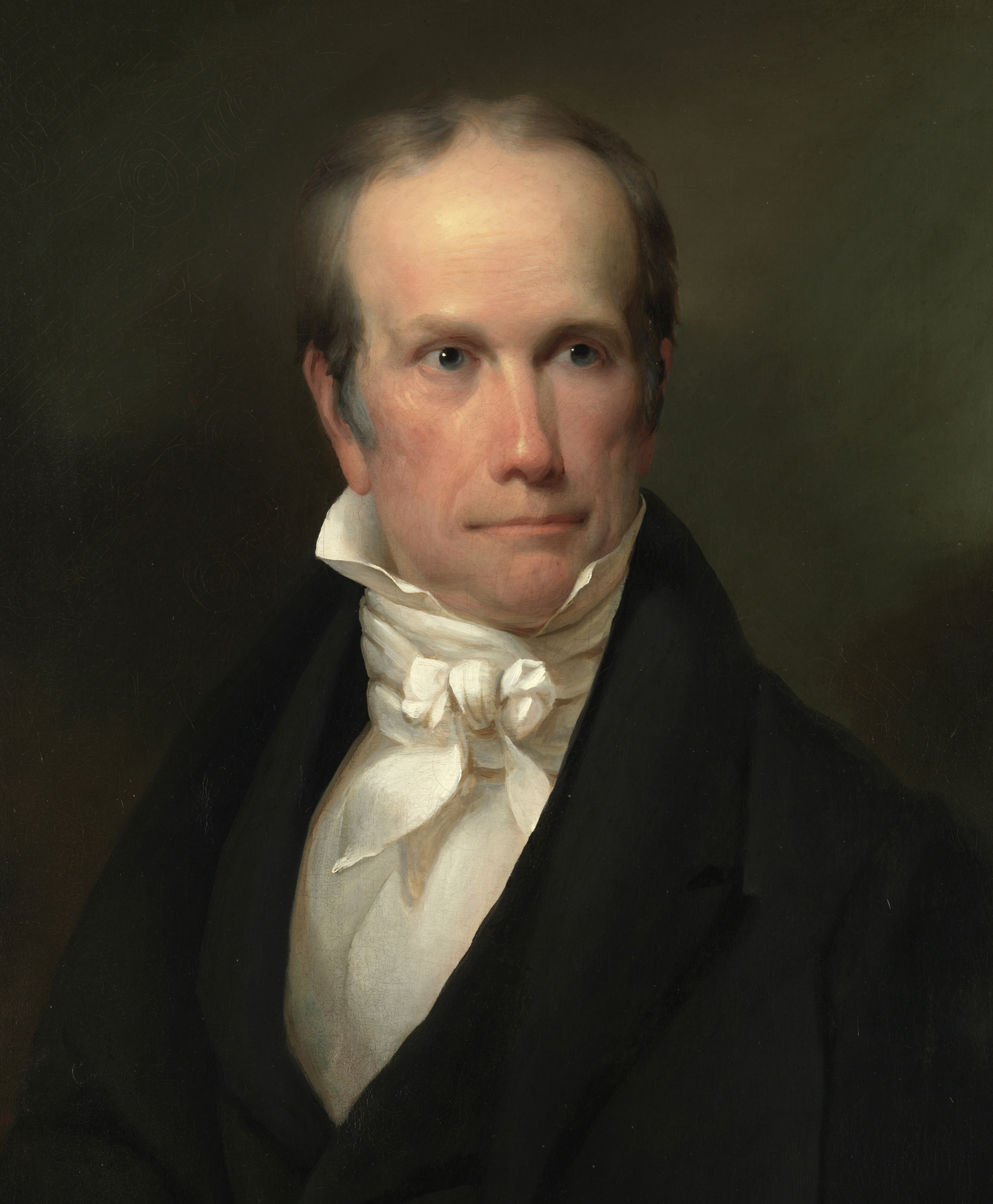
Nominee	Andrew Jackson	Henry Clay
Party	Democratic	National Republican
Home state	Tennessee	Kentucky
Running mate	Martin Van Buren	John Sergeant
Electoral vote	8	0
Popular vote	23,826	23,466
Percentage	49.89%	49.13%
County results
Jackson
50–60%
60–70%
70–80%
Clay
50–60%
60–70%

The 1832 United States presidential election in New Jersey took place between November 2 and December 5, 1832, as part of the 1832 United States presidential election. Voters chose eight representatives, or electors to the Electoral College, who voted for President and Vice President.

New Jersey voted for the Democratic Party candidate, Andrew Jackson, over the National Republican candidate, Henry Clay, and the Anti-Masonic Party candidate, William Wirt. Jackson won New Jersey by a margin of 0.76%. This was the closest election in the state's history.

== Results ==
1832 United States presidential election in New Jersey
Party	Candidate	Votes	Percentage	Electoral votes
Democratic	Andrew Jackson (incumbent)	23,826	49.89%	8
National Republican	Henry Clay	23,466	49.13%	0
Anti-Masonic	William Wirt	468	0.98%	0
Totals		47,760	100.0%	8

== See also ==
- United States presidential elections in New Jersey
