= 1804 United States presidential election in New Jersey =

- November 6–7, 1804
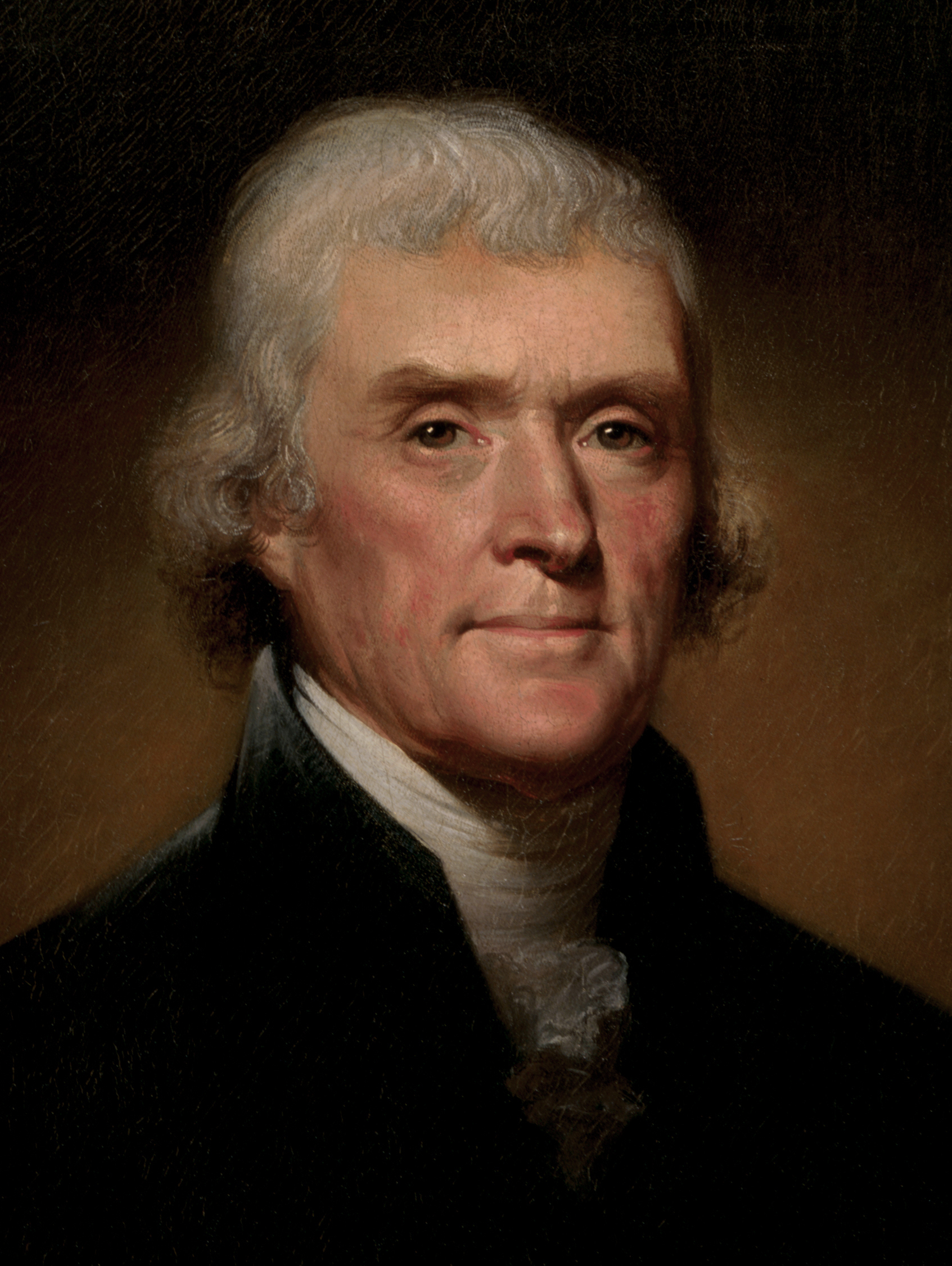

Nominee	Thomas Jefferson	Unpledged electors
Party	Democratic-Republican	Federalist
Home state	Virginia	N/A
Running mate	George Clinton	N/A
Electoral vote	8	0
Popular vote	13,119	19
Percentage	99.9%	0.1%
County results
Jefferson
>90%
No data
President before election
Thomas Jefferson
Democratic-Republican
Elected President
Thomas Jefferson
Democratic-Republican

A presidential election was held in New Jersey on November 6 and 7, 1804, as part of the 1804 United States presidential election. The Democratic-Republican Party's ticket of incumbent president Thomas Jefferson and former New York governor George Clinton was elected virtually without opposition.

Jefferson won the national election in a landslide over the de facto Federalist candidate, Charles Cotesworth Pinckney. Although a clandestine gathering of Federalist members of Congress had nominated Pinckney in February, in states where electors were chosen by popular vote, the Federalist ticket was formally unpledged. The New Jersey Federalist Party did not formally nominate electors, but a few Federalists received votes as write-in candidates.

== General election ==
=== Summary ===
New Jersey chose eight electors on a statewide general ticket. Nineteenth-century election laws required voters to elect the members of the Electoral College individually, rather than as a block. This sometimes resulted in small differences in the number of votes cast for electors pledged to the same presidential nominee, if some voters did not vote for all the electors nominated by a party. The following table compares the votes for the leading Democratic-Republican and Federalist electors to give an approximate sense of the statewide popular vote.

1804 United States presidential election in New Jersey
Party	Candidate	Votes	%
Democratic-Republican	Thomas Jefferson George Clinton	13,119	99.86
Federalist	Unpledged electors (write-in)	19	0.14
Total votes		13,138	100.00

=== Results ===
1804 United States presidential election in New Jersey
Party	Candidate	Votes
Democratic-Republican	Phineas Manning	13,119
Democratic-Republican	Alexander Carmichael	13,109
Democratic-Republican	Thomas Newbold	13,100
Democratic-Republican	Solomon Freleigh	13,095
Democratic-Republican	William Rossell	13,094
Democratic-Republican	Jacob Hufty	13,066
Democratic-Republican	Abijah Smith	13,062
Democratic-Republican	Moore Furman	13,039
Federalist	Aaron Ogden	19
Federalist	Richard Stockton	11
Federalist	Franklin Davenport	8
—N/a	James Schureman	8
Federalist	Samuel Stanhope Smith	7
—N/a	A. D. Woodruff	6
—N/a	Thomas Bullman	6
—N/a	William W. MacCullough	6
Federalist	Isaac Smith	5
Federalist	Thomas Sinnickson	5
—N/a	Alexander MacWhorter	5
—N/a	John Kinney	4
—N/a	Philemon Dickinson	4
—N/a	Thomas Anderson	4
—N/a	John Holmes	4
—N/a	George Bidleman	3
Federalist	John Doughty	3
—N/a	William Woodhull	3
Democratic-Republican	Joseph Cooper	2
—N/a	James Stone	2
Democratic-Republican	Silas Dickerson	2
—N/a	Charles Pemberton	2
—N/a	William Sanford Pennington	2
Democratic-Republican	Henry Vanderveer	2
—N/a	Ebenezer Tucker	2
—N/a	Sheppard Collack	1
—N/a	Ebenezer Seeley	1
Federalist	William Colfax	1
Federalist	Lambert Cadwalader	1
Federalist	James H. Imlay	1
Federalist	Peter D. Vroom	1
—N/a	Thomas Hendry	1
—N/a	Hendrick Hendrickson	1
—N/a	Alexander Kirkpatrick	1
Total votes		≈13,138

=== Results by county ===
This table compares the votes for the leading elector pledged to each ticket by county. It therefore differs slightly from the results summary, which compares the votes for the leading electors statewide. Returns from several counties appear to be lost.

1804 United States presidential election in New Jersey
County	Thomas Jefferson Democratic-Republican		Unpledged electors Federalist		Margin		Total
County	Votes	%	Votes	%	Votes	%	Total
Bergen	**		**		**		**
Burlington	**		**		**		**
Cape May	**		**		**		**
Cumberland	765	99.87	1	0.13	764	99.74	766
Essex	2,523	100.00	—		2,523	100.00	2,523
Gloucester	906	99.78	2	0.22	904	99.56	908
Hunterdon	1,342	100.00	—		1,342	100.00	1,342
Middlesex	**		**		**		**
Monmouth	713	99.86	1	0.14	712	99.72	714
Morris	**		**		**		**
Salem	864	100.00	—		864	100.00	864
Somerset	560	99.29	4	0.71	556	98.58	564
Sussex	1,518	99.61	6	0.39	1,512	99.22	1,524
TOTAL	9,191	99.85	14	0.15	9,177	99.70	9,205

== See also ==
- United States presidential elections in New Jersey

== Bibliography ==
- Dauer, Manning Julian (2002). "Election of 1804". In Schlesinger, Arthur M. Jr.; Israel, Fred L. (eds.). History of American Presidential Elections, 1789–2001. Vol. 1. Philadelphia: Chelsea House Publishers. pp. 159–82.
- Lampi, Philip J. (n.d.). "Electoral College". A New Nation Votes. American Antiquarian Society.
- Lampi, Philip J. (2012). "New Jersey 1804 Electoral College". A New Nation Votes. American Antiquarian Society.
