= 1888 United States presidential election in New Jersey =

- November 6, 1888
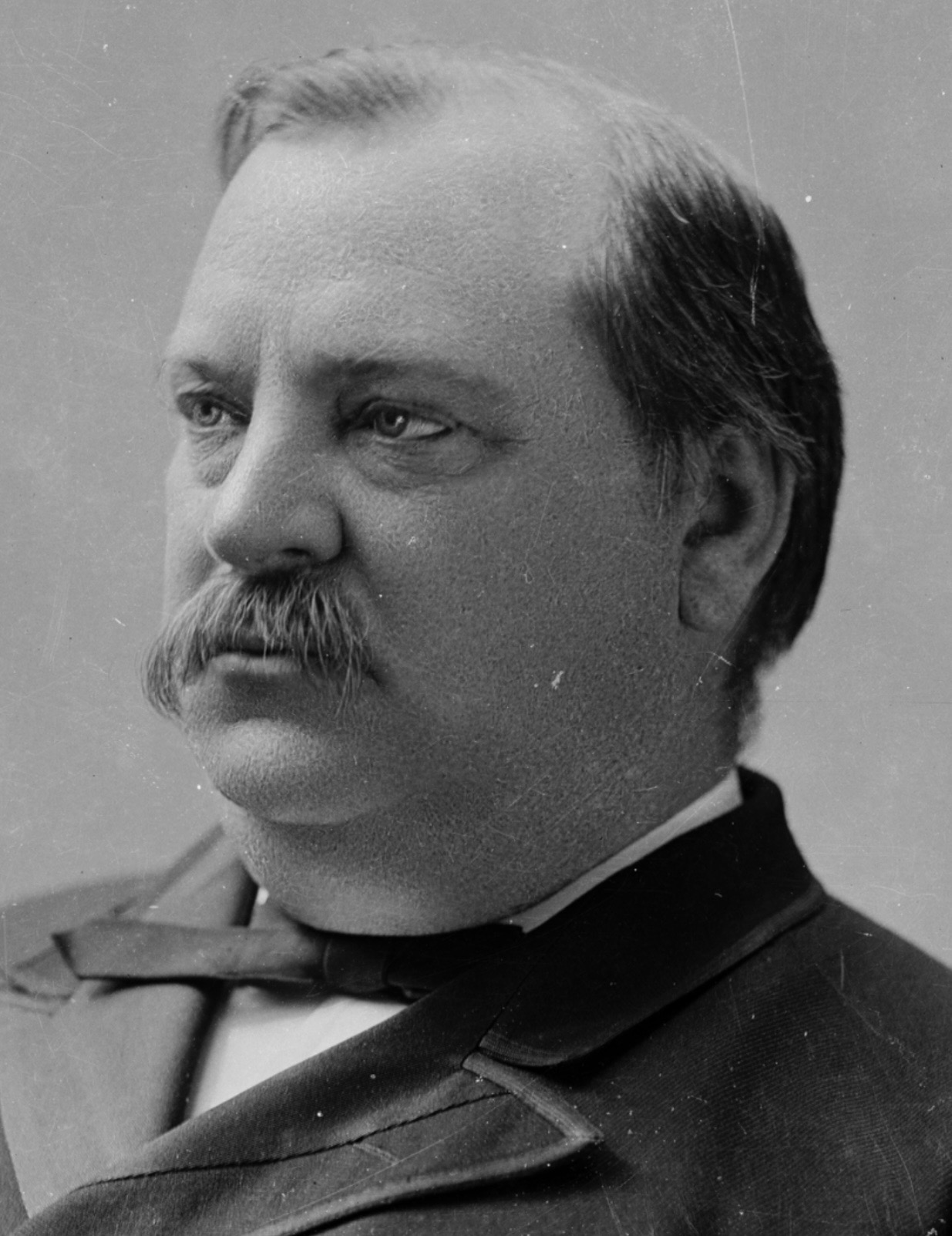

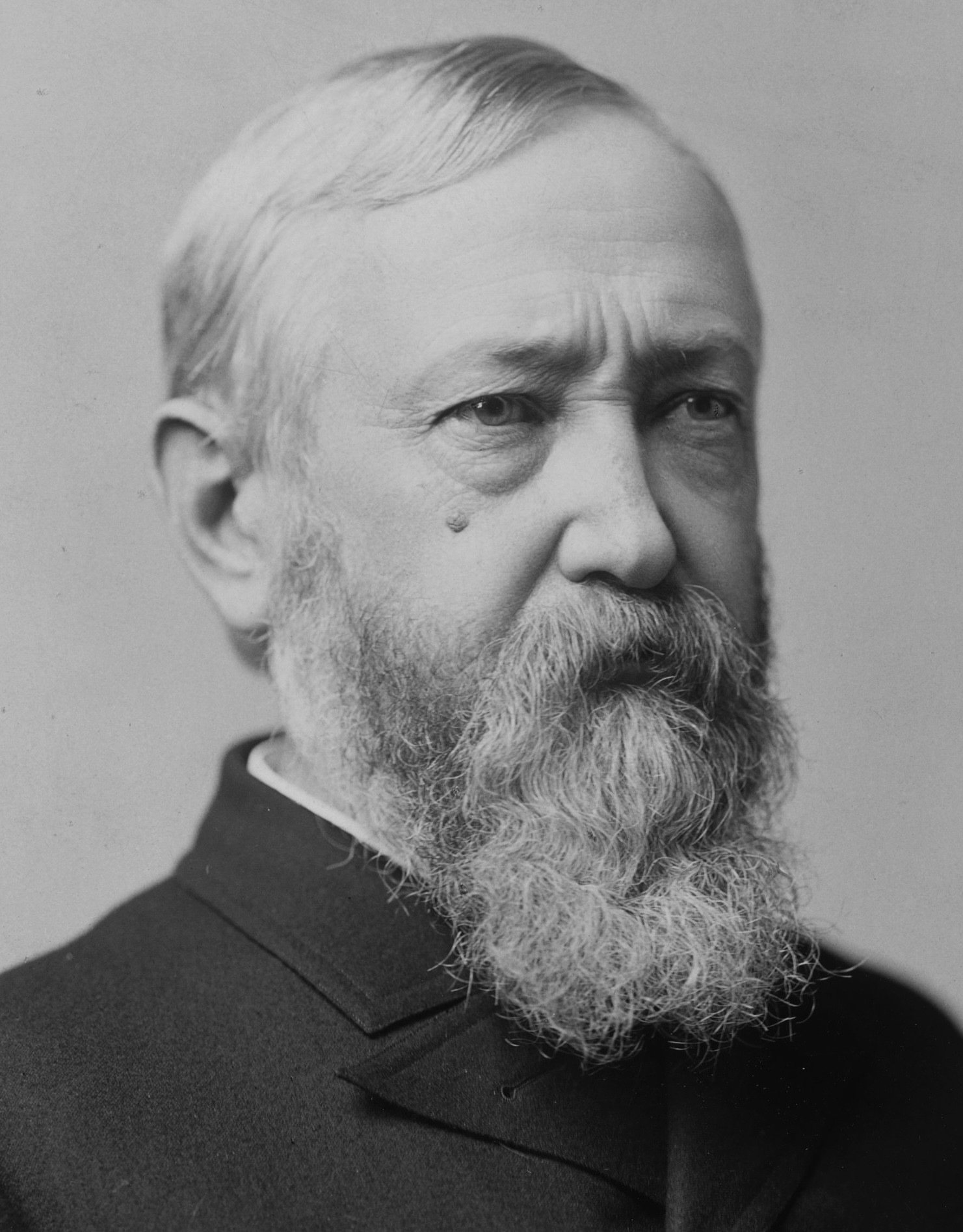
Nominee	Grover Cleveland	Benjamin Harrison
Party	Democratic	Republican
Home state	New York	Indiana
Running mate	Allen G. Thurman	Levi P. Morton
Electoral vote	9	0
Popular vote	151,508	144,360
Percentage	49.87%	47.52%
County results
Cleveland
40–50%
50–60%
Harrison
40–50%
50–60%
President before election
Grover Cleveland
Democratic
Elected President
Benjamin Harrison
Republican

The 1888 United States presidential election in New Jersey took place on November 6, 1888, as part of the 1888 United States presidential election. Voters chose nine representatives, or electors to the Electoral College, who voted for president and vice president.

New Jersey voted for the Democratic nominee, incumbent President Grover Cleveland, over the Republican nominee, Benjamin Harrison. Cleveland won his birth state by a very narrow margin of 2.35%.

A Republican would not win the White House without New Jersey again until 112 years later in 2000, when Al Gore won New Jersey by a landslide but narrowly lost the national election.

== Results ==
1888 United States presidential election in New Jersey
Party	Candidate	Running mate	Popular vote		Electoral vote	
Party	Candidate	Running mate	Count	%	Count	%
Democratic	Grover Cleveland of New York (incumbent)	Allen Granberry Thurman of Ohio	151,508	49.87%	9	100.00%
Republican	Benjamin Harrison of Indiana	Levi Parsons Morton of New York	144,360	47.52%	0	0.00%
Prohibition	Clinton Bowen Fisk of New Jersey	John Anderson Brooks of Missouri	7,933	2.61%	0	0.00%
Total			303,801	100.00%	9	100.00%

=== Results by county ===
County	Stephen Grover Cleveland Democratic		Benjamin Harrison Republican		Clinton Bowen Fisk Prohibition		Various candidates Write-ins		Margin		Total votes cast
County	#	%	#	%	#	%	#	%	#	%	Total votes cast
Atlantic	2,560	43.74%	3,030	51.77%	263	4.49%			-470	-8.03%	5,853
Bergen	4,898	53.00%	4,239	45.87%	104	1.13%			659	7.13%	9,241
Burlington	6,969	46.43%	7,479	49.83%	561	3.74%			-510	-3.40%	15,009
Camden	7,899	41.86%	10,490	55.59%	481	2.55%			-2,591	-13.73%	18,870
Cape May	1,100	40.31%	1,464	53.65%	165	6.05%			-364	-13.34%	2,729
Cumberland	4,353	40.55%	5,542	51.63%	840	7.82%			-1,189	-11.08%	10,735
Essex	25,183	49.14%	25,300	49.36%	768	1.50%			-117	-0.23%	51,251
Gloucester	3,093	41.92%	3,969	53.79%	317	4.30%			-876	-11.87%	7,379
Hudson	27,609	58.32%	19,442	41.07%	289	0.61%	1	0.00%	8,167	17.25%	47,341
Hunterdon	5,530	57.47%	3,554	36.93%	537	5.58%	2	0.02%	1,976	20.53%	9,623
Mercer	8,214	45.52%	9,455	52.40%	373	2.07%	1	0.01%	-1,241	-6.88%	18,043
Middlesex	7,209	53.25%	6,061	44.77%	268	1.98%			1,148	8.48%	13,538
Monmouth	8,509	51.53%	7,357	44.55%	648	3.92%			1,152	6.98%	16,514
Morris	5,580	46.73%	5,826	48.79%	536	4.49%			-246	-2.06%	11,942
Ocean	1,465	37.63%	2,315	59.47%	113	2.90%			-850	-21.83%	3,893
Passaic	8,950	46.57%	9,984	51.95%	273	1.42%	10	0.05%	-1,034	-5.38%	19,217
Salem	3,185	46.76%	3,353	49.23%	273	4.01%			-168	-2.47%	6,811
Somerset	3,294	49.68%	3,141	47.38%	195	2.94%			153	2.31%	6,630
Sussex	3,310	56.94%	2,343	40.31%	160	2.75%			967	16.64%	5,813
Union	7,570	52.27%	6,658	45.97%	254	1.75%			912	6.30%	14,482
Warren	5,078	56.79%	3,358	37.55%	505	5.65%	1	0.01%	1,720	19.24%	8,942
Totals	151,558	49.88%	144,360	47.51%	7,923	2.61%	15	0.00%	7,198	2.37%	303,856

== See also ==
- United States presidential elections in New Jersey
