= Elections in New Jersey =

Elections in New Jersey are authorized under Article II of the New Jersey State Constitution, which establishes elections for the governor, the lieutenant governor, and members of the New Jersey Legislature. Elections are regulated under state law, Title 19. The office of the New Jersey Secretary of State has a Division of Elections that oversees the execution of elections under state law (This used to be the New Jersey Attorney General). In addition, the New Jersey Election Law Enforcement Commission (ELEC) is responsible for administering campaign financing and lobbying disclosure.

Between 1860 and 2024, the state voted Democratic 57% of the time. Traditionally not a swing state, it has voted Democratic in recent decades, as George H. W. Bush was the last Republican candidate for president to carry the state, in 1988. The congressional delegations have leaned Democratic since 1965, however, Republicans did hold a majority from 1995 to 1999. The delegation was evenly split 6-6 from 2013 to 2017, but after the 2018 elections, Democrats held 11 of the 12 seats, the largest seat share since 1912. Currently, they hold a 9–3 majority. The New Jersey Legislature has also switched hands over the years, and one house was evenly divided from 2002 to 2004, however, Democrats have gained ground and have controlled both chambers of the legislature since 2004. On the state level, Republicans are more competitive as the governorship has alternated between the two major parties since the election of Democrat Richard J. Hughes in 1961, with a succession of Republicans and Democrats serving as governor. Since 2018, New Jersey has had a Democratic governor, Phil Murphy, and a Democratic Lieutenant Governor, Tahesha Way, who was appointed following the death of Sheila Oliver in 2023, followed by Democrat Mikie Sherrill who was inaugurated Governor in 2026. Both of its senators have been Democrats since 1979, except brief periods with Republican appointees.

New Jersey is split almost down the middle between the New York City media market and Philadelphia media market, respectively the largest and fourth-largest markets in the nation. As a result, campaign budgets are among the largest in the country. In a 2020 study, New Jersey was ranked as the 16th easiest state for citizens to vote in.

== Constitutional history ==
In 1776, the first Constitution of New Jersey was drafted. It was written during the Revolutionary War, and was created a basic framework for the state government. The Constitution granted the right of suffrage to women and black men who met certain property requirements. The New Jersey Constitution of 1776 allowed "all inhabitants of this Colony, of full age, who are worth fifty pounds proclamation money" to vote. This included blacks, spinsters, and widows; married women could not own property under the common law. The Constitution declared itself temporary, and it was to be void if there was reconciliation with Great Britain. Both parties in elections mocked the other party for relying on "petticoat electors" and accused the other of allowing unqualified women to vote.

The second version of the New Jersey State Constitution was written in 1844. The Constitution provided the right of suffrage only to white males, removing it from women and black men. Some of the important components of the second State Constitution include the separation of the powers of the executive, legislative, and judicial branches. The new constitution also provided a bill of rights. The people had the right to directly elect the governor.

The current 1947 state constitution reinforces the basic rights found in the United States Constitution, but also contains several unique provisions, such as regulations governing the operation of casinos. At 26,159 words, the document is slightly shorter than the average American state constitution (about 28,300 words).

== Recent trends ==
Gubernatorial election results
Year	Democratic	Republican
1953	53.2% 962,710	44.7% 809,068
1957	54.6% 1,101,130	44.5% 897,321
1961	50.4% 1,084,194	48.7% 1,049,274
1965	57.4% 1,279,568	41.1% 915,996
1969	38.5% 911,003	59.7% 1,411,905
1973	66.7% 1,414,613	31.9% 676,235
1977	55.7% 1,184,564	41.8% 888,880
1981	49.4% 1,144,202	49.5% 1,145,999
1985	29.3% 578,402	69.6% 1,372,631
1989	61.2% 1,379,937	37.2% 838,553
1993	48.3% 1,210,031	49.3% 1,236,124
1997	45.8% 1,107,968	46.9% 1,133,394
2001	56.4% 1,256,853	41.7% 928,174
2005	53.5% 1,224,551	43.0% 985,271
2009	44.9% 1,087,731	48.4% 1,174,445
2013	38.2% 809,978	60.2% 1,278,932
2017	56.0% 1,203,110	41.9% 899,583
2021	51.2% 1,339,471	48.0% 1,255,185
2025	56.8% 1,890,610	42.5% 1,417,705

United States presidential election results for New Jersey
Year	Republican / Whig		Democratic		Third party(ies)	
Year	No.	%	No.	%	No.	%
1836	26,137	50.53%	25,592	49.47%	0	0.00%
1840	33,351	51.74%	31,034	48.15%	69	0.11%
1844	38,318	50.46%	37,495	49.37%	131	0.17%
1848	40,015	51.48%	36,901	47.47%	819	1.05%
1852	38,556	46.33%	44,305	53.24%	359	0.43%
1856	28,338	28.51%	46,943	47.23%	24,115	24.26%
1860	58,346	48.13%	62,869	51.87%	0	0.00%
1864	60,723	47.16%	68,024	52.84%	0	0.00%
1868	80,131	49.12%	83,001	50.88%	0	0.00%
1872	91,656	54.52%	76,456	45.48%	0	0.00%
1876	103,517	47.01%	115,962	52.66%	714	0.32%
1880	120,555	49.02%	122,565	49.84%	2,808	1.14%
1884	123,440	47.31%	127,798	48.98%	9,683	3.71%
1888	144,360	47.52%	151,508	49.87%	7,933	2.61%
1892	156,101	46.24%	171,066	50.67%	10,456	3.10%
1896	221,535	59.68%	133,695	36.02%	15,981	4.31%
1900	221,754	55.27%	164,879	41.10%	14,573	3.63%
1904	245,164	56.68%	164,566	38.05%	22,817	5.28%
1908	265,326	56.79%	182,567	39.08%	19,305	4.13%
1912	88,835	20.53%	178,289	41.20%	165,615	38.27%
1916	268,982	54.40%	211,018	42.68%	14,442	2.92%
1920	611,541	67.65%	256,887	28.42%	35,515	3.93%
1924	675,162	62.17%	297,743	27.41%	113,174	10.42%
1928	926,050	59.77%	616,517	39.79%	6,814	0.44%
1932	775,684	47.59%	806,630	49.48%	47,749	2.93%
1936	720,322	39.57%	1,083,850	59.54%	16,265	0.89%
1940	945,475	47.93%	1,016,808	51.55%	10,269	0.52%
1944	961,335	48.95%	987,874	50.31%	14,552	0.74%
1948	981,124	50.33%	895,455	45.93%	72,976	3.74%
1952	1,374,613	56.81%	1,015,902	41.99%	29,039	1.20%
1956	1,606,942	64.68%	850,337	34.23%	27,033	1.09%
1960	1,363,324	49.16%	1,385,415	49.96%	24,372	0.88%
1964	963,843	33.86%	1,867,671	65.61%	15,256	0.54%
1968	1,325,467	46.10%	1,264,206	43.97%	285,722	9.94%
1972	1,845,502	61.57%	1,102,211	36.77%	49,516	1.65%
1976	1,509,688	50.08%	1,444,653	47.92%	60,131	1.99%
1980	1,546,557	51.97%	1,147,364	38.56%	281,763	9.47%
1984	1,933,630	60.09%	1,261,323	39.20%	22,909	0.71%
1988	1,743,192	56.24%	1,320,352	42.60%	36,009	1.16%
1992	1,356,865	40.58%	1,436,206	42.95%	550,523	16.47%
1996	1,103,078	35.86%	1,652,329	53.72%	320,400	10.42%
2000	1,284,173	40.29%	1,788,850	56.13%	114,203	3.58%
2004	1,670,003	46.23%	1,911,430	52.92%	30,704	0.85%
2008	1,613,207	41.61%	2,215,422	57.14%	48,778	1.26%
2012	1,478,749	40.50%	2,126,610	58.25%	45,781	1.25%
2016	1,601,933	41.00%	2,148,278	54.99%	156,512	4.01%
2020	1,883,313	41.40%	2,608,400	57.33%	57,744	1.27%
2024	1,968,215	46.06%	2,220,713	51.97%	83,797	1.96%

In national elections, New Jersey has recently leaned towards the national Democratic Party. For much of the 20th century, New Jersey was one of the most Republican states in the Northeast. It supported Republican presidential candidates from 1896 to 1988 all but seven times: 1912, Franklin Roosevelt's four wins in 1932, 1936, 1940, and 1944, as well as 1960 and 1964. It gave comfortable margins of victory to the Republican candidate in the close elections of 1948, 1968, and 1976.

However, the brand of Republicanism in New Jersey has historically been a moderate one. As the national party tilted more to the right, the state's voters became more willing to support Democrats at the national level. This culminated in 1992, when Bill Clinton narrowly carried the state, becoming the first Democrat to win it since 1964. Since then, Democrats have always carried the state with the only relatively close presidential elections being 2004 and 2024, decided by 7 and 6 points, respectively. Clinton won it handily in 1996, and Al Gore won it almost as easily in 2000. In the 2008 and 2012 presidential elections, Democrat Barack Obama carried the state by more than 15 percentage points. Hillary Clinton won it by over 14 points in 2016 and in the 2020 election, Joe Biden won the state by 16 points. Indeed, the 2004 and 2024 elections are the only elections in recent years where the race hasn't been called for the Democrats soon after the polls closed. As a result, at the presidential level, New Jersey is now considered part of the solid bloc of Democratic states in the Northeast referred to as the "blue wall".

The most recent victory by a Republican in a U.S. Senate race in the state was Clifford P. Case's reelection in 1972. Only Hawaii has had a longer period of exclusive Democratic victories in U.S. Senate races. The last Republican to hold a Senate seat from New Jersey was Jeffrey Chiesa, who was appointed a U.S. Senator by Governor Chris Christie in 2013 after Democrat Frank Lautenberg died in office. Chiesa served four months in office and did not seek election in his own right.

After George H. W. Bush won the last Republican presidential victory in New Jersey in 1988, only one Republican has ever won more than 50% of the vote in any statewide New Jersey election, that being Chris Christie who was re-elected as governor in 2013 with 60% of the vote. As New Jersey is split almost down the middle between the New York City and Philadelphia television markets, advertising budgets for statewide elections are among the most expensive in the country.

=== Partisan strongholds ===
The state's Democratic strongholds are generally the more urbanized northeastern, central, and southwestern counties along the New Jersey Turnpike. Counties with major cities are typically the most Democratic, Hudson County has Jersey City, Essex County has Newark, Union County has Elizabeth, Mercer County has Trenton, and Camden County has the city of Camden. Other counties that generally vote Democratic include the more suburban counties of Bergen, Middlesex, Burlington, and Somerset.

The state's more rural to suburban northwestern counties are Republican strongholds, namely mountainous Sussex, Hunterdon and Warren counties. The Jersey Shore along the coast also favor Republicans, notably Ocean, Monmouth, and Cape May counties. Salem County also is reliably Republican with its smaller, rural, and working-class population. In recent elections, Ocean County has been the most Republican in the state, as it is the only county in the state to consistently give Republicans over 60% of the vote.

=== Swing counties ===
Some counties such as Morris County and Passaic County in the north have become swing counties in recent elections. Most of South Jersey remains electorally competitive and frequently sees voters split their tickets for candidates of different parties, such as in Atlantic County, Gloucester County, and Cumberland County.

In state-level elections, some of the reliably Democratic counties at the federal level are much more competitive for Republicans, particularly in Bergen, Burlington, Somerset, and Passaic counties. For instance, in the 2021 New Jersey gubernatorial election, Democrats carried all five of those counties, but by less than half of the margin that they did in the 2020 presidential election.

=== Unaffiliated voters ===
Unaffiliated is a status for registered voters in New Jersey. Those voters who do not specify a political party affiliation when they register to vote are listed as unaffiliated. Affiliated voters may change their status to unaffiliated or to another political party if they wish, although any such change must be filed with the state 55 days before the primary election. As of July 2020, there were 2.3 million unaffiliated voters in New Jersey, less than the number of registered Democrats but more than the number of registered Republicans. If a registered unaffiliated voter in NJ wishes to vote in a primary election, they may affiliate at any time, up to and including primary election day.

New Jersey is a closed primary state. This means that only voters who affiliate with a political party may vote in that party's candidate selection process (i.e., the primary election). However, unaffiliated voters may declare their party affiliation up to and including the day of the primary election. Unaffiliated status does not affect participation in general elections.

== County line ==
The county line or party line refers to the first column of the ballot which includes candidates for federal, state, and local offices who have received the endorsement of the county party while non-endorsed candidates are listed in other columns.

Although enjoined in the 2024 Democratic primaries by a March 2024 federal court order from the practice, New Jersey is the only state to allow political parties to give preferential placement on primary election ballots to endorsed candidates.

The Democratic primary in the 2024 United States Senate election in New Jersey brought national media attention to the county line election practice. In March 2024, a New Jersey federal judge issued a preliminary injunction in Kim v. Hanlon, preventing the county clerks from following the practice as highly likely to be unconstitutional.

Only Sussex and Salem Counties do not use the county line in their ballot designs, though mail-in ballots in other counties also may not use it.

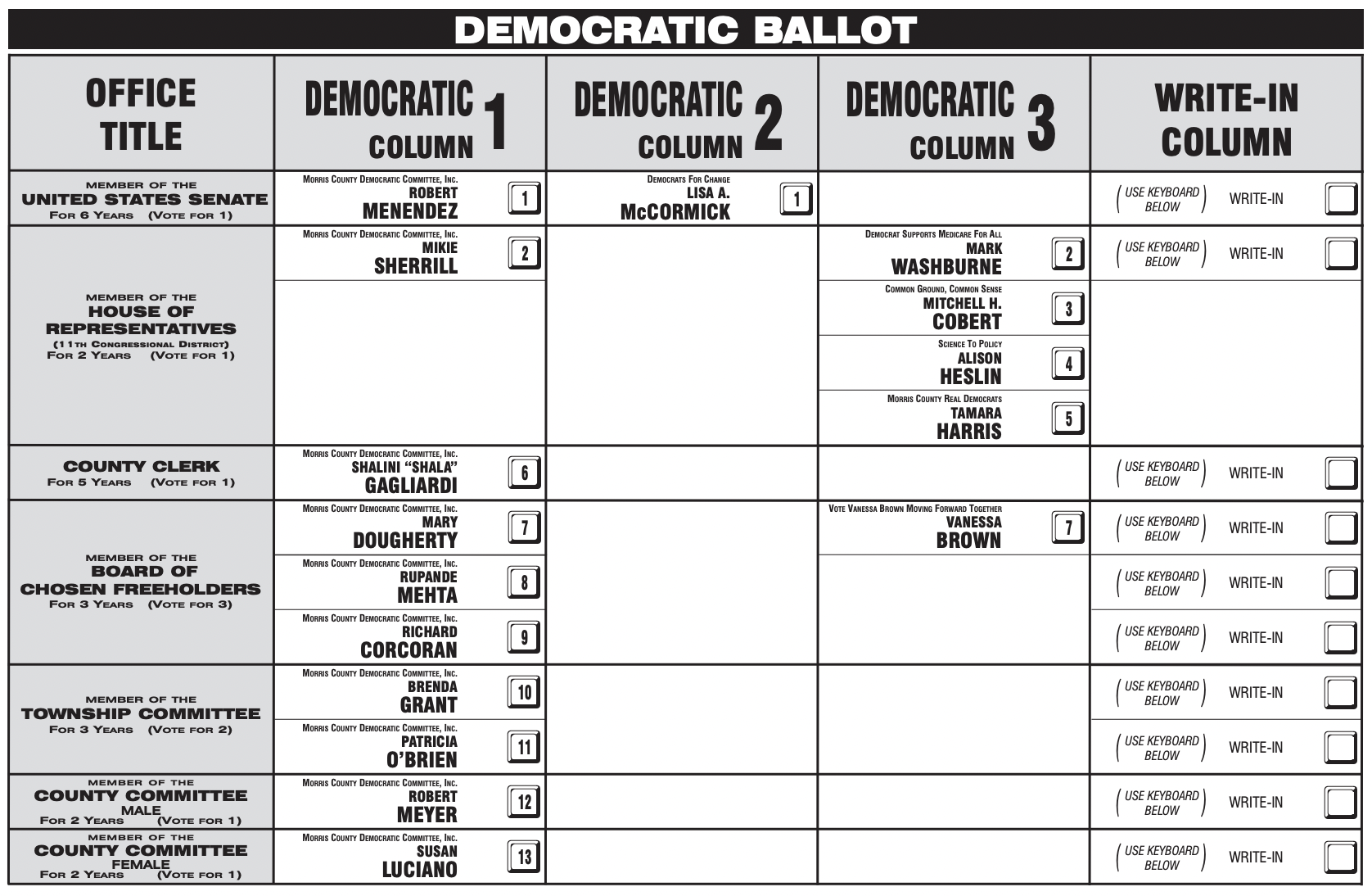
This is a Morris County sample ballot from the 2018 Democratic Primary that illustrates the "line". Column 1 has all the endorsed candidates while non-endorsed candidates are isolated in Columns 2 and 3.

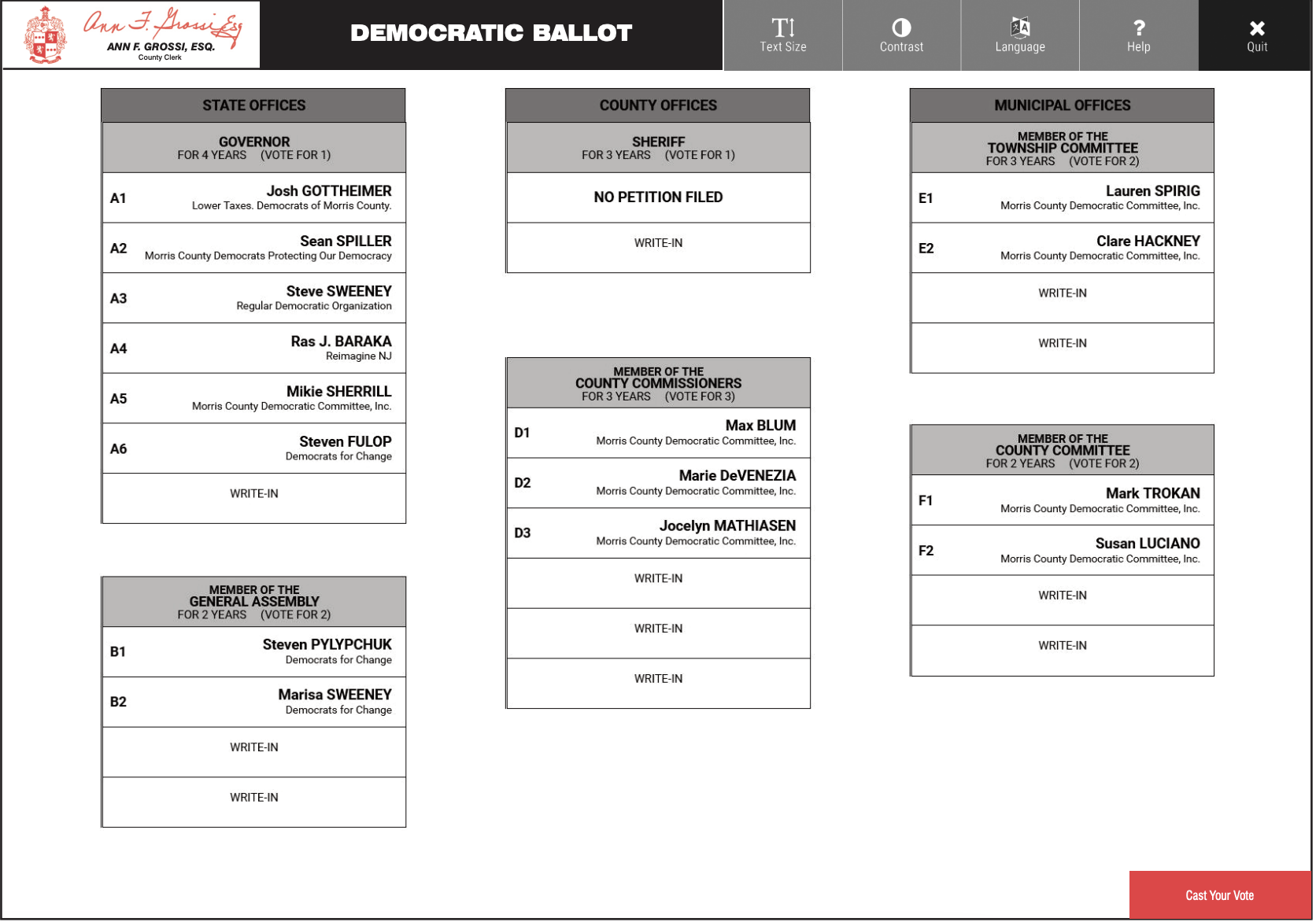
This is a Morris County sample ballot from the 2025 Democratic Primary that shows a ballot post "line". The ballot is organized in an office-block configuration, meaning candidates are grouped by office instead of by endorsed status. The political party slogan remains, but it does not determine ballot placement.

=== Impact ===
The visual impact of the county line has a strong effect on New Jersey voters. Many voters will vote for all or most candidates placed on the county line, giving local parties and chairpersons significant power in determining nominations; candidates with the line very rarely lose election. County parties urge voters to "vote the line" or "vote Column A" with heavy advertising. Some recent research suggests the line confers an enormous advantage. In one New Jersey study:

Every candidate performed substantially better — an average of 38 percentage points better — when on the county line than when their opponent was on the county line.

The county line ballot can also prove confusing to voters when two competing Congressional candidates are both endorsed by one county party (thus both appearing "on the line") — as was the case in a 2020 primary, where a third of voters voted for both candidates and therefore had their votes disqualified.

=== History ===
According to a Rutgers University Law Review article examining the history of New Jersey's county line primary ballot, the county line is traceable to the powerful political machines in the state. In the past, political machines controlled candidate nominations through behind-the-scenes agreements. To address this, the New Jersey state legislature introduced reforms starting in 1903, aiming to allow voters to directly choose candidates and reduce the influence of the machine.

The state passed significant reform, the Geran Act, in 1911 to break the secret management of party machines. Despite the initial success of reforms, political machines regained control through legal decisions, leading to the establishment of the New Jersey county line.

=== Criticisms ===
Many voters, candidates, and organizations have criticized the county line and its ballot design as confusing and undemocratically empowering a small number of party insiders – in some cases only the county party chair – to decide elections.

In March 2024, a group of nearly 40 New Jersey women, all elected officials and former candidates, issued a joint statement advocating for line abolishment and denouncing the line practice as archaic voter suppression tending to result in the exclusion of women from political office in the state.

=== Defenses ===
Some assert that the county line has a usefulness in terms of screening candidates for ability to win in the general, for adequacy, and for party cohesion:

The county line system is not without defenders. Micah Rasmussen, director of the Rebovich Institute for New Jersey Politics at Rider University, said he believed the county line could be a useful tool for screening candidates and preserving party identity. "It's sort of like a board of directors making a recommendation to shareholders," Professor Rasmussen said. "It's up to voters to ratify or not ratify the recommendations.

In 2024, Governor Murphy defended the line and the judgment of local county chairs in awarding the line, stating: "First of all – bosses, I hate that word. That's just not, that's not the reality. These folks who are chairs have had decades of experience and why you would ignore that experience is beyond me."

In 2024, Essex County Democratic Chair LeRoy Jones authored a New Jersey Globe column defending the associational rights of political parties and advocating for the legislature to adopt a uniform ballot design.

=== Selection process ===
The line may be awarded by the county party chair absent meaningful input from the county committee members. In New Jersey, the county committee is typically made up of one male resident and one female resident elected from each election district or ward (sometimes known in other states as a precinct) within a municipality.

Even in those circumstances where these local county party members are permitted to vote for the candidates at a party convention to award the line, not every county utilizes a secret ballot. In those counties where votes are public, the prior endorsements of local party bosses mean that those county party committee members who are also elected officials, county or municipal employees, or do other business with the county risk the displeasure of the county party chair upon their public vote. Many committee members are frequently beholden to the county chair for their continued employment; county commissioners are reliant on the county chair for their ballot position. As one commentator noted during the early 2024 county conventions prior to the Democratic party primary in June 2024:

Many of the largest party organizations in the state have endorsed Tammy Murphy [for U.S. Senate] without having their members vote — and that has raised questions about the endorsement process's fairness because of the governor's outsize influence and power. ... Tammy Murphy received the endorsements of eight Democratic Party county committee chairs in the five days after she announced her candidacy for Menendez's seat. Most of those committees do not hold secret ballot votes.

In 2024, New Jersey progressive activist Winn Khuong told Politico she believed that the lack of secret ballots tended to make committee members feel political pressure to vote in accordance with the local county chair.

Some commentators in outlets like the New Jersey Globe have stated that the local county chairs have a vested interest in being seen as the sole source of the decision-making power with respect to the line award, as their personal individual control over it – and thus their control over the political future of candidates – is the source of their ability to raise donations and affect political outcomes in the state. In four out of the five counties with the highest number of Democratic voters in New Jersey, there is no requirement to respect the preferences of the membership. Committee members in Essex, Hudson, and Camden counties do not participate in voting for Senate race endorsements, leaving the decision solely in the hands of their chairs. Middlesex County conducts an advisory vote, but party officials mentioned to Gothamist that it is at the chair's discretion whether to follow it.

=== 2024 federal injunction ===
A pending lawsuit, Conforti v. Hanlon, filed in 2020 by former candidates and New Jersey Working Families Alliance, is challenging the county line as unconstitutional; U.S. Senate candidate Andy Kim filed a similar suit, Kim v. Hanlon, in 2024, successfully obtaining a preliminary injunction ceasing the practice as of the June primary election.

On February 26, 2024, Kim filed a federal lawsuit in the District Court of New Jersey, aiming to redesign the primary ballot in New Jersey and claiming that the preferential ballot placement is unconstitutional and allows voters to be "cynically manipulated." Kim filed the lawsuit with two other candidates for office, Sarah Schoengood in New Jersey's 3rd congressional district and Carolyn Rush in New Jersey's 2nd congressional district against 19 county clerks whose counties utilize the preferential ballot system. Kim said in a statement that "New Jersey voters don't want to be told who to vote for."

Federal district judge Zahid Quraishi is overseeing both cases and held a hearing on March 18 in which Kim, an election expert, a researcher, a county clerk, and a county printing vendor testified. April 20 is the mailing deadline for the June primary if the county line is struck down and an office block layout is used. In March 2024, the liberal political organizations End Citizens United and Defend The Vote coauthored a guest column in Insider NJ in support of Kim's suit. That same month, the Wall Street Journal editorial page issued its support for Kim's suit, calling the line an unconstitutional practice and problematic bossism.

The ACLU joined Kim's suit as an amicus, also arguing against the county line practice as hindering a fair vote and as illegal governmental viewpoint discrimination. The League of Women Voters of New Jersey, along with a number of other progressive New Jersey groups, also filed an amicus brief siding with Kim, as well as three Asian American groups. On March 17, New Jersey Attorney General Matt Platkin filed a letter brief with the court in the Kim suit, explaining in detail the legal reasons why his office would not defend the state's county organizational line, as he had concluded based on the legal history and record in the case that it was unconstitutional. The decision was criticized by Phil Murphy as being out of step with the opinions of prior Attorneys General.

==== Ruling and appeal ====
On March 29, the district court issued a preliminary injunction against the Democratic county line, directing clerks to instead print ballots with candidates organized by office in randomized order for the 2024 primary election. On March 30, the court issued an order, in response to a letter query from Republicans, that the preliminary injunction, as a technical matter, only restrained the Democratic primary county line as the Democratic primary was the only election in which plaintiffs had sought relief in the instant matter; however, the court noted that county parties and clerks could observe the applicability of its reasoning to the entire ballot should they choose to.

By March 31, the Warren, Ocean, Burlington, Essex and Hudson county clerks had each excused themselves from an effort to appeal and agreed to implement the non-line ballot as ordered in time for the June Democratic primary, the remainder of the county-line clerks indicated they planned to pursue an appeal, claiming it was too challenging to implement a non-line ballot by the deadline. Some progressive commentators attacked the taxpayer-funded nature of the appeal, suggesting that the clerks' appeals were not truly politically neutral in nature but rather likely designed to appease the political machine that controls the ballot in each county.

A panel of the United States Court of Appeals for the Third Circuit ordered an accelerated briefing schedule on the appeal. By mid-April 2024, all of the county clerks had dropped from the appeal, leaving the Camden County and Middlesex County respective Democratic organizations to pursue the appeal. In a published decision issued on April 17, the appeal of the preliminary injunction was denied.

Governor Murphy signed a bill on March 6, 2025, which directed ballots not to visually separate candidates' names as was done with the party line and candidates to be placed in random order by drawing. However, the law allows candidates to include a six-word slogan or endorsement message, continuing the ability for county parties to promote candidates on the ballot, a move that was criticized by numerous advocacy groups and Senator Andy Kim.

== See also ==
- United States presidential elections in New Jersey
- Politics of New Jersey
- Political party strength in New Jersey
- Law of New Jersey
- Women's suffrage in New Jersey
