= 1932 United States presidential election in New Jersey =

- November 8, 1932
- Turnout: 82.83% (▼4.49%)

Nominee	Franklin D. Roosevelt	Herbert Hoover
Party	Democratic	Republican
Home state	New York	California
Running mate	John Nance Garner	Charles Curtis
Electoral vote	16	0
Popular vote	806,630	775,684
Percentage	49.48%	47.59%
County results
Roosevelt
40–50%
50–60%
70–80%
Hoover
50–60%
President before election
Herbert Hoover
Republican
Elected President
Franklin D. Roosevelt
Democratic

The 1932 United States presidential election in New Jersey took place on November 8, 1932. All contemporary 48 states were part of the 1932 United States presidential election. Voters chose 16 electors to the Electoral College, which selected the president and vice president.

New Jersey was won by the Democratic nominees, Governor Franklin D. Roosevelt of New York and his running mate Speaker of the House John Nance Garner of Texas. Roosevelt and Garner defeated the Republican nominees, incumbent Republican President Herbert Hoover of California and incumbent Vice President Charles Curtis of Kansas.

Roosevelt narrowly carried New Jersey with a plurality of 49.48 percent of the vote to Hoover's 47.59 percent, a victory margin of 1.89%. Socialist Party candidate Norman Thomas finished in third in New Jersey with 2.64%, more than the 2.23 percent he received nationally. Reflecting a nationwide left-wing backlash against the conservative policies that had been perceived to have culminated in the Great Depression in 1929, Thomas in 1932 received more than 8 times the 0.32 percent he had received in 1928. Combined, socialist parties received 2.89 percent of the vote in New Jersey in 1932, nearly seven times the 0.43 percent of 1928. This left-wing backlash was also evident in Roosevelt's own victory in the state. His 1932 victory, although narrow, represented a nearly 22-point swing in favor of the Democratic Party from the results of 1928, in a state that had long been a Republican stronghold. In 1920 and 1924, the state had voted over 68 percent and over 62 percent Republican respectively, with GOP victory margins over the Democrats of nearly 40 points.

On the county level map, reflecting the closeness of the race, Roosevelt managed to narrowly win the state despite carrying only 4 of the state's 21 counties. The most important component to Roosevelt's victory was his overwhelming victory in heavily populated Hudson County, part of the New York City metro area, and populated by many urban ethnic immigrant communities. Like NYC, the county- along with the state as a whole- had begun trending Democratic in the 1928 election, when the Democrats had nominated Al Smith, a New York City native, and Roman Catholic of Irish, Italian and German immigrant heritage who appealed strongly to ethnic immigrant communities primarily concentrated in urban areas. While Smith in 1928 lost the state overall by a 39.79%–59.77% margin, this still represented a dramatic gain from just four years earlier: in 1924, southern Democrat John W. Davis had received only 27% of the vote in New Jersey. Besides Hudson County, Smith had also made dramatic Democratic gains in other urban parts of North Jersey, including Essex County, home to Newark, along with Middlesex County, Passaic County, Union County, Bergen County, and Mercer County.

Nevertheless, despite losing nationally in a 58–41 GOP landslide, Smith's Democratic gains in urban areas across America, laying the groundwork for a new urban Democratic coalition, were nowhere more evident than in the New York City metro area. After two Republican sweeps of all five boroughs of New York City in 1920 and 1924, Smith won a commanding victory in all five boroughs of NYC in 1928. In New Jersey, this urban popularity in the New York City area spilled over into nearby Hudson County, New Jersey. Despite losing every other county in the state, many by large margins, Smith carried Hudson County with over sixty percent of the vote.

In 1932, with embattled incumbent Republican Herbert Hoover being perceived as failing to adequately address the Great Depression, many urban ethnic working-class voters swung even more strongly to the Democratic Party, and Franklin Roosevelt would receive over seventy percent of the vote in Hudson County, providing much of the raw vote margin by which he managed to eke out a narrow statewide win.

Besides his landslide win in Hudson County, FDR also won majorities in heavily populated Middlesex County and rural Warren County, and won a plurality in fairly populated Passaic County, in the last of which he was the first Democratic victor since James Buchanan in 1856. However, Hoover kept the race close statewide by winning majorities in 17 of the state's 21 counties, although all of them by relatively close margins, failing to break sixty percent in a single county.

== Results ==
1932 United States presidential election in New Jersey
Party	Candidate	Votes	Percentage	Electoral votes
Democratic	Franklin D. Roosevelt	806,630	49.48%	16
Republican	Herbert Hoover (incumbent)	775,684	47.59%	0
Socialist	Norman Thomas	42,998	2.64%	0
Communist	William Z. Foster	2,915	0.18%	0
Socialist Labor	Verne L. Reynolds	1,062	0.07%	0
National Prohibition	William Upshaw	774	0.05%	0
Totals		1,630,063	100.0%	16

=== Results by county ===
County	Franklin D. Roosevelt Democratic		Herbert Hoover Republican		Norman M. Thomas Socialist		William Z. Foster Communist		Verne L. Reynolds Socialist Labor		William D. Upshaw National Prohibition		Margin		Total votes cast
County	#	%	#	%	#	%	#	%	#	%	#	%	#	%	Total votes cast
Atlantic	28,071	46.58%	31,264	51.88%	794	1.32%	84	0.14%	18	0.03%	30	0.05%	-3,193	-5.30%	60,261
Bergen	73,921	44.60%	86,885	52.42%	4,577	2.76%	244	0.15%	92	0.06%	24	0.01%	-12,964	-7.82%	165,743
Burlington	15,824	38.95%	23,623	58.14%	1,070	2.63%	34	0.08%	31	0.08%	47	0.12%	-7,799	-19.20%	40,629
Camden	48,825	44.45%	55,856	50.85%	4,825	4.39%	114	0.10%	52	0.05%	175	0.16%	-7,031	-6.40%	109,847
Cape May	7,160	40.96%	10,112	57.84%	174	1.00%	4	0.02%	8	0.05%	24	0.14%	-2,952	-16.89%	17,482
Cumberland	12,371	41.28%	16,668	55.61%	728	2.43%	33	0.11%	32	0.11%	139	0.46%	-4,297	-14.34%	29,971
Essex	132,666	45.63%	149,630	51.46%	7,540	2.59%	546	0.19%	369	0.13%	21	0.01%	-16,964	-5.83%	290,772
Gloucester	13,817	41.17%	18,782	55.96%	836	2.49%	17	0.05%	32	0.10%	77	0.23%	-4,965	-14.79%	33,561
Hudson	184,676	71.85%	66,937	26.04%	4,923	1.92%	409	0.16%	64	0.02%	10	0.00%	117,739	45.81%	257,019
Hunterdon	7,531	46.13%	8,476	51.92%	274	1.68%	20	0.12%	5	0.03%	20	0.12%	-945	-5.79%	16,326
Mercer	30,284	45.28%	33,715	50.41%	2,606	3.90%	210	0.31%	51	0.08%	13	0.02%	-3,431	-5.13%	66,879
Middlesex	45,997	56.94%	32,673	40.45%	1,838	2.28%	217	0.27%	35	0.04%	21	0.03%	13,324	16.49%	80,781
Monmouth	35,219	45.89%	40,467	52.73%	893	1.16%	80	0.10%	51	0.07%	31	0.04%	-5,248	-6.84%	76,741
Morris	20,117	37.81%	31,481	59.17%	1,510	2.84%	52	0.10%	6	0.01%	36	0.07%	-11,364	-21.36%	53,202
Ocean	7,508	40.67%	10,513	56.95%	366	1.98%	56	0.30%	8	0.04%	9	0.05%	-3,005	-16.28%	18,460
Passaic	54,576	49.88%	49,218	44.99%	5,061	4.63%	398	0.36%	135	0.12%	16	0.01%	5,358	4.90%	109,404
Salem	7,357	42.22%	9,870	56.64%	147	0.84%	11	0.06%	5	0.03%	35	0.20%	-2,513	-14.42%	17,425
Somerset	12,345	43.66%	15,317	54.18%	541	1.91%	57	0.20%	9	0.03%	4	0.01%	-2,972	-10.51%	28,273
Sussex	6,136	45.76%	7,130	53.18%	132	0.98%	3	0.02%	1	0.01%	6	0.04%	-994	-7.41%	13,408
Union	51,357	41.77%	67,512	54.91%	3,729	3.03%	307	0.25%	49	0.04%	7	0.01%	-16,155	-13.14%	122,961
Warren	10,636	52.25%	9,277	45.58%	417	2.05%	12	0.06%	1	0.00%	12	0.06%	1,359	6.68%	20,355
Totals	806,394	49.49%	775,406	47.59%	42,988	2.64%	2,908	0.18%	1,054	0.06%	757	0.05%	30,988	1.90%	1,629,507

==== Counties that flipped from Republican to Democratic ====
- Passaic
- Middlesex
- Warren

== Analysis ==
Overall, the Northeast was Roosevelt's weakest region in 1932, with all 6 of Hoover's state victories coming from this region amid a nationwide Democratic landslide. However, the overwhelming urban vote in FDR's favor in 1932 helped to narrowly tip New Jersey into the Democratic column, even as much of the state's geographic area remained Republican. A similar pattern was seen in neighboring New York State, which FDR won comfortably despite winning only ten of the state's 62 counties, the overwhelming majority of his victory margin there being provided by landslide wins in the five boroughs of massively populated New York City.

Like most Northeastern states, New Jersey in the early decades of the 20th century had been a reliably Republican state; the state had not given a majority of the vote to a Democratic presidential candidate since 1892. (In 1912, Woodrow Wilson, then the sitting Governor of New Jersey, won the state's electoral votes, but with a plurality of only 41 percent in a 3-way race against a split Republican field, with former Republican President Theodore Roosevelt running as a third party candidate against incumbent Republican President William Howard Taft. Wilson lost the state to the GOP by a decisive 12-point margin in a head-to-head match-up in 1916.) The state's strong Republican lean was still evident in FDR's 1932 election campaign: although he narrowly won the state with a 49.5-47.6 plurality over Herbert Hoover, in the midst of his nationwide landslide, that still made the state almost 16 points more Republican than the nation. By 1936, with the emergence of the New Deal Coalition, FDR would make dramatic gains for the Democratic Party in New Jersey that would endure and transform it into a closely divided swing state with only a slight Republican lean, a pattern that would endure for much of the 20th century until New Jersey ultimately became a solidly Democratic state in the 1990s.

== See also ==
- Presidency of Franklin D. Roosevelt
- United States presidential elections in New Jersey
