= 1912 United States presidential election in New Jersey =

- November 5, 1912

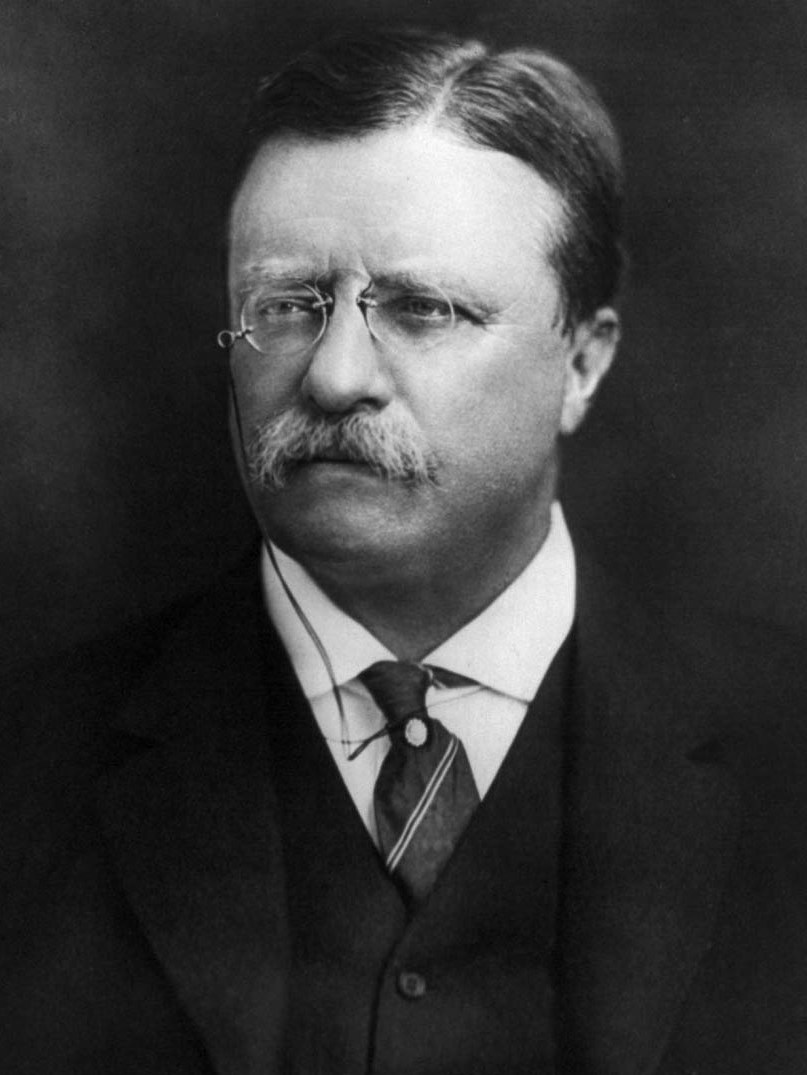

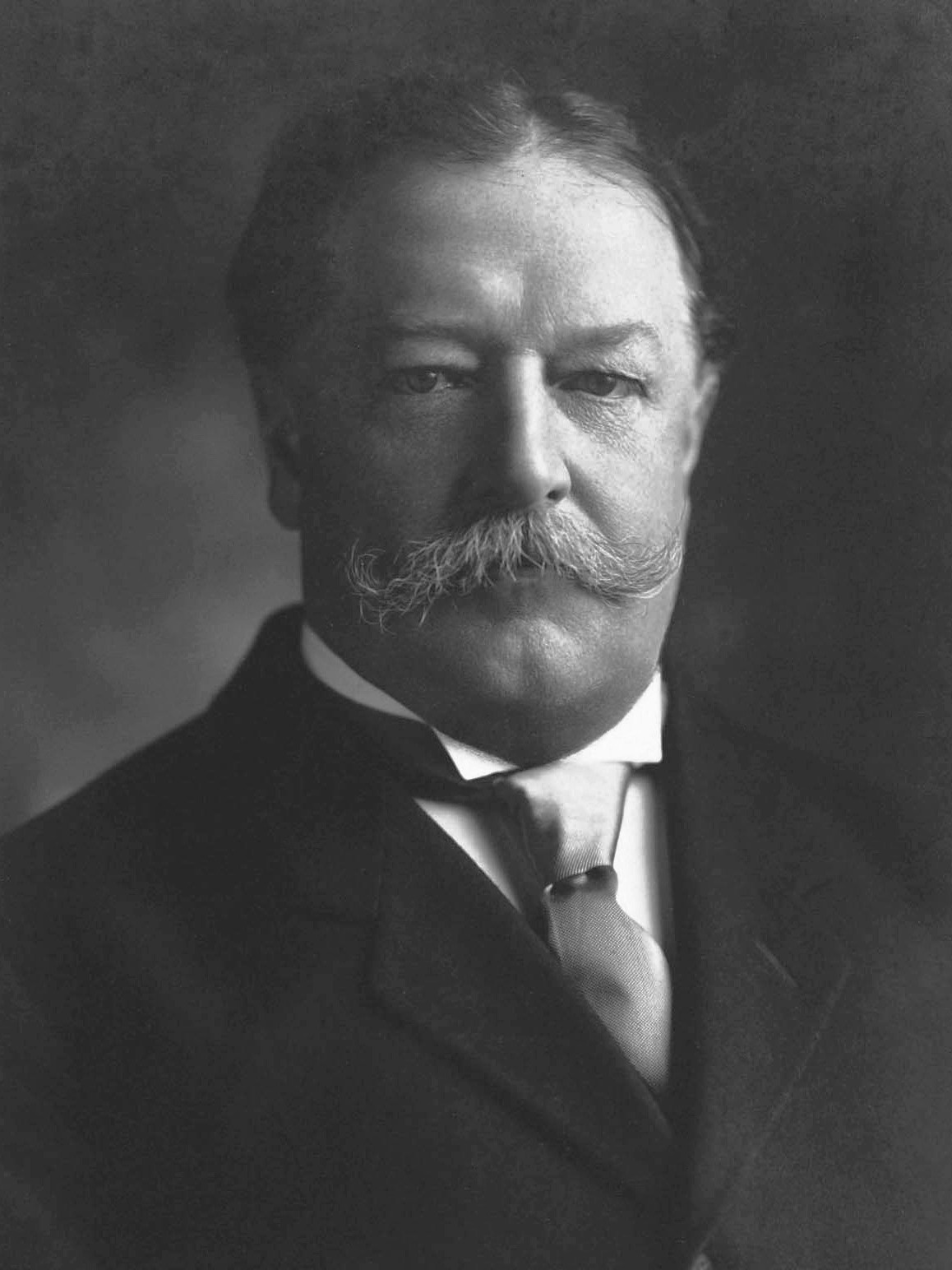
Nominee	Woodrow Wilson	Theodore Roosevelt	William Howard Taft
Party	Democratic	Progressive	Republican
Home state	New Jersey	New York	Ohio
Running mate	Thomas R. Marshall	Hiram Johnson	Nicholas Murray Butler
Electoral vote	14	0	0
Popular vote	178,289	145,410	88,835
Percentage	41.20%	33.60%	20.53%
County results
Wilson
30–40%
40–50%
50–60%
Roosevelt
30–40%
40–50%
President before election
William Howard Taft
Republican
Elected President
Woodrow Wilson
Democratic

The 1912 United States presidential election in New Jersey took place on November 5, 1912. All contemporary 48 states were part of the 1912 United States presidential election. Voters chose 14 electors to the Electoral College, which selected the president and vice president.

New Jersey was won by the Democratic nominees, Governor Woodrow Wilson of New Jersey and his running mate Governor Thomas R. Marshall of Indiana. Wilson and Marshall defeated the Progressive Party nominees, former President Theodore Roosevelt of New York and his running mate Governor Hiram Johnson of California, and the Republican nominees, incumbent President William Howard Taft of Ohio and his running mate incumbent Vice President James S. Sherman of New York. Wilson carried New Jersey with a bare plurality of 41.20 percent of the vote to Roosevelt's 33.60 percent, a victory margin of 7.60 percent. Taft came in third place with 20.53 percent. Coming in a distant fourth was Socialist candidate Eugene V. Debs, who took 3.69 percent.

Like much of the Northeast, New Jersey in this era was a staunchly Republican state, having not given a majority of the vote to a Democratic presidential candidate since 1892. In his initial 1908 election campaign, Taft had carried New Jersey by a comfortable 57–39 margin. However, in 1912, the Republican Party was split as former Republican President Theodore Roosevelt ran as a third party candidate against incumbent Republican President William Howard Taft, splitting the Republican voter base, and allowing Wilson to win many states with pluralities. Despite being the sitting Governor of New Jersey, Wilson only managed to earn 41 percent of the vote in his home state, but with the GOP split, this would prove to be enough to win New Jersey's electoral votes. Were Taft and Roosevelt voters united behind a single Republican candidate, the GOP would have received 54.13 percent of the vote. Although it was Wilson's home state and he had served as governor there, the results in 1912 made the state about 6% more Progressive than the nation. Wilson became the only candidate in the 1912 election to carry both his home state (New Jersey) and his birth state (Virginia).

== Results ==
1912 United States presidential election in New Jersey
Party	Candidate	Votes	Percentage	Electoral votes
Democratic	Woodrow Wilson	178,289	41.20%	14
Progressive	Theodore Roosevelt	145,410	33.60%	0
Republican	William Howard Taft (incumbent)	88,835	20.53%	0
Socialist	Eugene V. Debs	15,948	3.69%	0
Prohibition	Eugene W. Chafin	2,936	0.68%	0
Socialist Labor	Arthur E. Reimer	1,321	0.31%	0
Totals		432,739	100.0%	14

=== Results by county ===
County	Woodrow Wilson Democratic		William Howard Taft Republican		Theodore Roosevelt Progressive "Bull Moose"		Eugene Debs Socialist		Eugene Chafin Prohibition		Arthur Reimer Socialist Labor		Margin (Note: Because Roosevelt finished second behind Wilson in New Jersey as a whole, all margins given are Wilson vote minus Roosevelt vote and percentage margins Wilson percentage minus Roosevelt percentage unless otherwise noted.)		Total votes cast
County	#	%	#	%	#	%	#	%	#	%	#	%	#	%	Total votes cast
Atlantic	4,885	34.99%	4,422	31.67%	4,245	30.40%	220	1.58%	153	1.10%	38	0.27%	463 (Note: In this county where Taft did run second ahead of Roosevelt, margin given is Wilson vote minus Taft vote and percentage margin Wilson percentage minus Taft percentage.)	3.32%	13,963
Bergen	9,978	40.12%	5,087	20.46%	8,594	34.56%	947	3.81%	175	0.70%	87	0.35%	1,384	5.57%	24,868
Burlington	5,592	39.93%	3,967	28.33%	3,973	28.37%	220	1.57%	225	1.61%	27	0.19%	1,619	11.56%	14,004
Camden	10,812	36.64%	7,911	26.81%	8,718	29.54%	1,744	5.91%	263	0.89%	63	0.21%	2,094	7.10%	29,511
Cape May	2,124	42.24%	909	18.08%	1,847	36.73%	66	1.31%	73	1.45%	10	0.20%	277	5.51%	5,029
Cumberland	3,858	37.01%	1,895	18.18%	4,097	39.30%	303	2.91%	248	2.38%	23	0.22%	-239	-2.29%	10,424
Essex	26,250	32.57%	16,994	21.08%	33,627	41.72%	3,320	4.12%	167	0.21%	243	0.30%	-7,377	-9.15%	80,601
Gloucester	3,364	38.29%	1,856	21.12%	3,108	35.37%	206	2.34%	232	2.64%	20	0.23%	256	2.91%	8,786
Hudson	40,517	52.55%	8,763	11.37%	24,156	31.33%	3,169	4.11%	143	0.19%	356	0.46%	16,361	21.22%	77,104
Hunterdon	4,103	53.37%	1,970	25.62%	1,470	19.12%	51	0.66%	74	0.96%	20	0.26%	2,133	27.74%	7,688
Mercer	7,773	36.80%	5,676	26.88%	6,907	32.70%	586	2.77%	105	0.50%	73	0.35%	866	4.10%	21,120
Middlesex	8,186	44.49%	4,743	25.78%	5,061	27.51%	250	1.36%	111	0.60%	48	0.26%	3,125	16.98%	18,399
Monmouth	9,799	48.55%	3,683	18.25%	6,305	31.24%	232	1.15%	126	0.62%	37	0.18%	3,494	17.31%	20,182
Morris	5,628	40.07%	3,329	23.70%	4,440	31.61%	413	2.94%	216	1.54%	20	0.14%	1,188	8.46%	14,046
Ocean	1,858	37.61%	919	18.60%	2,055	41.60%	44	0.89%	46	0.93%	18	0.36%	-197	-3.99%	4,940
Passaic	10,810	35.41%	5,349	17.52%	11,701	38.32%	2,374	7.78%	89	0.29%	208	0.68%	-891	-2.92%	30,531
Salem	2,745	45.14%	1,803	29.65%	1,374	22.59%	80	1.32%	68	1.12%	11	0.18%	942	15.49%	6,081
Somerset	3,146	42.50%	2,068	27.94%	2,059	27.82%	46	0.62%	66	0.89%	17	0.23%	1,078	14.56%	7,402
Sussex	2,852	53.10%	890	16.57%	1,506	28.04%	49	0.91%	71	1.32%	3	0.06%	1,346	25.06%	5,371
Union	9,695	38.54%	5,421	21.55%	8,429	33.51%	1,484	5.90%	82	0.33%	45	0.18%	1,266	5.03%	25,156
Warren	4,663	55.14%	1,411	16.68%	2,007	23.73%	144	1.70%	203	2.40%	29	0.34%	2,656	31.41%	8,457
Totals	178,289	41.20%	88,835	20.53%	145,410	33.60%	15,948	3.69%	2,936	0.68%	1,321	0.31%	32,879	7.60%	432,739

== Analysis ==
On the county-level map, Wilson carried 17 of the state's 21 counties, although seven with pluralities between forty and fifty percent of the vote, and six with pluralities of less than forty percent. Wilson won majorities only in urban Hudson County and the three rural counties in western North Jersey, Warren, Sussex, and Hunterdon, which had long been non-Yankee Democratic enclaves in the otherwise Republican Northeast. Warren and Hunterdon had never voted Republican as of 1912, and Sussex only for William McKinley in 1896.

As Roosevelt and his Bull Moose Party finished a strong second ahead of incumbent Republican Taft in the state, the remaining four counties went to Roosevelt. Roosevelt won urban Essex County along with Ocean County with pluralities between 40 and 50% of the vote, while winning Passaic County and Cumberland County with pluralities of less than 40% of the vote. The latter two counties voted for a non-Republican for the first time since 1856. Taft finished a weak third place in the state for an incumbent president and official Republican nominee, and failed to win a single county in New Jersey, the first of two times that a Republican did so, along with 1964. This was the first time since the Republican Party's founding that Ocean County did not vote for a Republican. Monmouth County voted Democratic for the first time since 1884, Burlington since 1876, Camden and Cape May since 1860, Mercer and Atlantic since 1856, and Gloucester for the first time ever.

== See also ==
- Presidency of Woodrow Wilson
- United States presidential elections in New Jersey
