= 1844 United States presidential election in New Jersey =

- November 5, 1844
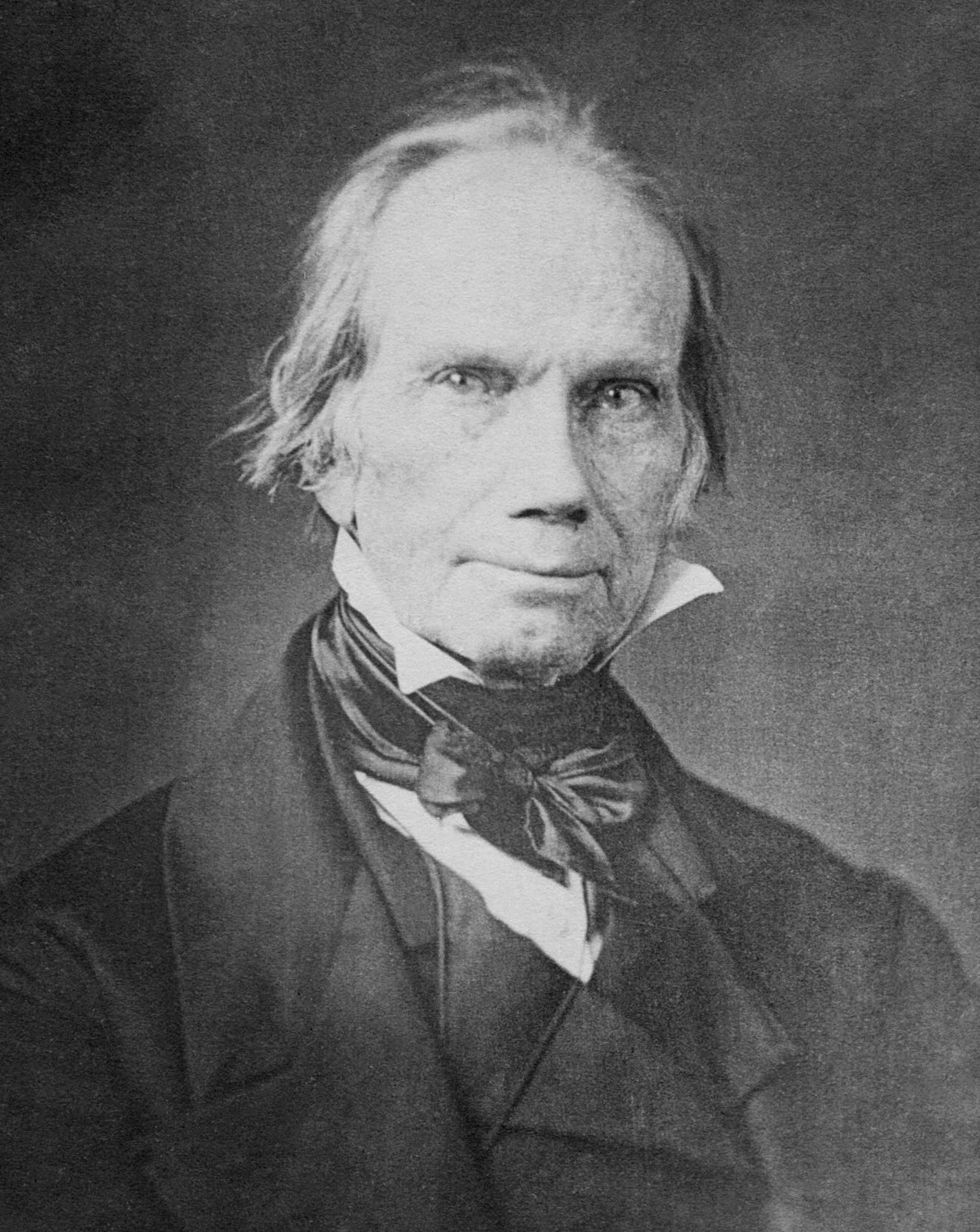

Nominee	Henry Clay	James K. Polk
Party	Whig	Democratic
Home state	Kentucky	Tennessee
Running mate	Theodore Frelinghuysen	George M. Dallas
Electoral vote	7	0
Popular vote	38,318	37,495
Percentage	50.46%	49.37%
County results
Clay
50–60%
60–70%
70–80%
Polk
50–60%
60–70%
70–80%
President before election
John Tyler
Independent
Elected President
James K. Polk
Democratic

A presidential election was held in New Jersey on November 5, 1844 as part of the 1844 United States presidential election. Voters chose seven representatives, or electors to the Electoral College, who voted for President and Vice President.

New Jersey voted for the Whig candidate, Henry Clay, over Democratic candidate James K. Polk. Clay won New Jersey by a margin of 1.09 percent; however, Polk would be the last Democrat to carry Cape May County until Woodrow Wilson in 1912. This is the last time a Democrat won without carrying Hudson County.

== Results ==
1844 United States presidential election in New Jersey
Party	Candidate	Running mate	Popular vote		Electoral vote	
Party	Candidate	Running mate	Count	%	Count	%
Whig	Henry Clay of Kentucky	Theodore Frelinghuysen of New York	38,318	50.46%	7	100.00%
Democratic	James K. Polk of Tennessee	George M. Dallas of Pennsylvania	37,495	49.37%	0	0.00%
Liberty	James G. Birney of Michigan	Thomas Morris of Ohio	131	0.17%	0	0.00%
Total			75,944	100.00%	7	100.00%

== See also ==
- United States presidential elections in New Jersey
