= 1996 United States presidential election in New Jersey =

- November 5, 1996
- Turnout: 72.04% (▼10.44%)

Nominee	Bill Clinton	Bob Dole	Ross Perot
Party	Democratic	Republican	Independent
Alliance			Reform
Home state	Arkansas	Kansas	Texas
Running mate	Al Gore	Jack Kemp	Pat Choate
Electoral vote	15	0	0
Popular vote	1,652,329	1,103,078	262,134
Percentage	53.72%	35.86%	8.52%

Clinton
40–50%
50–60%
60–70%
70–80%
80–90%
90–100%
Dole
40–50%
50–60%
60–70%
70–80%
President before election
Bill Clinton
Democratic
Elected President
Bill Clinton
Democratic

The 1996 United States presidential election in New Jersey took place on November 5, 1996, and was part of the 1996 United States presidential election. Voters chose 15 representatives, or electors to the Electoral College, who voted for president and vice president. The major contenders were incumbent Democratic President Bill Clinton and Republican Senator from Kansas Bob Dole, with Reform Party candidate Ross Perot – listed as an "Independent" in New Jersey – running a distant third.

New Jersey voted decisively to re-elect Clinton, giving him 53.72% of the vote over Republican Bob Dole's 35.86%, a margin of 17.86% and a leftward shift of 15.49% from 1992, representing the largest such shift in either direction. This double-digit win and leftward shift indicated a major shift in New Jersey politics toward the Democratic Party. As recently as the 1980s, Republican presidential candidates had easily carried the state by double-digit margins. In 1992, Clinton won the state with a narrow 43-41 plurality over George H. W. Bush, but the state was still 3% more Republican than the nation at large. However, in 1996, New Jersey voted 9.33% more Democratic than the rest of the nation, which represented the first time the state voted more Democratic than the nation since 1964 and only the third time since 1904, and a distinction the state has held ever since.

As in neighboring New York and many other states, Clinton in 1996 drastically improved his electoral performance among suburban voters, a key voting bloc in New Jersey. Following this election, New Jersey has become a reliable blue state in presidential elections, not being seriously contested by Republicans since. Despite this, Dole is currently the only Republican to fail to garner 40 percent of the New Jersey ballot since Barry Goldwater in 1964.

As of the 2024 presidential election, this is the last time that Cape May and Ocean Counties voted for a Democratic presidential candidate.

== Results ==
1996 United States presidential election in New Jersey
Party	Candidate	Votes	Percentage	Electoral votes
Democratic	Bill Clinton (incumbent)	1,652,329	53.72%	15
Republican	Bob Dole	1,103,078	35.86%	0
Independent	Ross Perot	262,134	8.52%	0
Green	Ralph Nader	32,465	1.06%	0
Libertarian	Harry Browne	14,763	0.48%	0
Natural Law	John Hagelin	3,887	0.13%	0
Constitution	Howard Phillips	3,440	0.11%	0
Socialist Workers	James Harris	1,837	0.06%	0
Workers World	Monica Moorehead	1,337	0.04%	0
Socialist Equality	Jerome White	537	0.02%	0
Totals		3,075,807	100.00%	15
Voter Turnout (Voting age/Registered)				51%/71%

=== By county ===
County	Bill Clinton Democratic		Bob Dole Republican		Ross Perot Independent		Various candidates Other parties		Margin		Total votes cast
County	#	%	#	%	#	%	#	%	#	%	Total votes cast
Atlantic	44,434	53.15%	29,538	35.33%	8,261	9.88%	1,368	1.64%	14,896	17.82%	83,601
Bergen	191,085	52.66%	141,164	38.90%	25,512	7.03%	5,126	1.41%	49,921	13.76%	362,887
Burlington	85,086	51.94%	57,337	35.00%	18,407	11.24%	2,979	1.82%	27,749	16.94%	163,809
Camden	114,962	60.59%	52,791	27.83%	17,433	9.19%	4,537	2.39%	62,171	32.76%	189,723
Cape May	19,849	44.07%	19,357	42.98%	4,978	11.05%	852	1.89%	492	1.09%	45,036
Cumberland	25,444	54.68%	14,744	31.69%	5,348	11.49%	997	2.14%	10,700	22.99%	46,533
Essex	175,368	68.99%	65,162	25.63%	9,513	3.74%	4,153	1.63%	110,206	43.36%	254,196
Gloucester	51,915	51.66%	32,116	31.96%	14,361	14.29%	2,103	2.09%	19,799	19.70%	100,495
Hudson	116,121	69.95%	38,288	23.06%	8,965	5.40%	2,635	1.59%	77,833	46.89%	166,009
Hunterdon	18,446	35.66%	26,379	51.00%	5,686	10.99%	1,216	2.35%	-7,933	-15.34%	51,727
Mercer	77,641	58.94%	40,559	30.79%	10,536	8.00%	2,990	2.27%	37,082	28.15%	131,726
Middlesex	145,201	56.20%	82,433	31.90%	24,643	9.54%	6,109	2.36%	62,768	24.30%	258,386
Monmouth	120,414	48.37%	99,975	40.16%	22,754	9.14%	5,818	2.34%	20,439	8.21%	248,961
Morris	81,092	41.43%	95,830	48.96%	15,299	7.82%	3,524	1.80%	-14,738	-7.53%	195,745
Ocean	94,243	46.43%	82,830	40.81%	22,864	11.26%	3,039	1.50%	11,413	5.62%	202,976
Passaic	85,879	56.15%	53,594	35.04%	10,944	7.16%	2,534	1.66%	32,285	21.11%	152,951
Salem	12,044	46.34%	9,294	35.76%	4,124	15.87%	530	2.04%	2,750	10.58%	25,992
Somerset	50,673	44.87%	51,869	45.93%	8,377	7.42%	2,010	1.78%	-1,196	-1.06%	112,929
Sussex	19,525	36.04%	26,746	49.36%	6,705	12.37%	1,207	2.23%	-7,221	-13.32%	54,183
Union	108,102	56.82%	65,912	34.65%	12,432	6.53%	3,795	1.99%	42,190	22.17%	190,241
Warren	14,805	39.27%	17,160	45.52%	4,992	13.24%	744	1.97%	-2,355	-6.25%	37,701
Totals	1,652,329	53.72%	1,103,078	35.86%	262,134	8.52%	58,266	1.89%	549,251	17.86%	3,075,807

Counties that flipped from Republican to Democratic

- Bergen
- Cape May
- Monmouth
- Ocean
- Passaic
- Salem

== See also ==
- United States presidential elections in New Jersey
- Presidency of Bill Clinton
