= 1964 United States presidential election in New Jersey =

- November 3, 1964
- Turnout: 88.49% (▼2.57%)
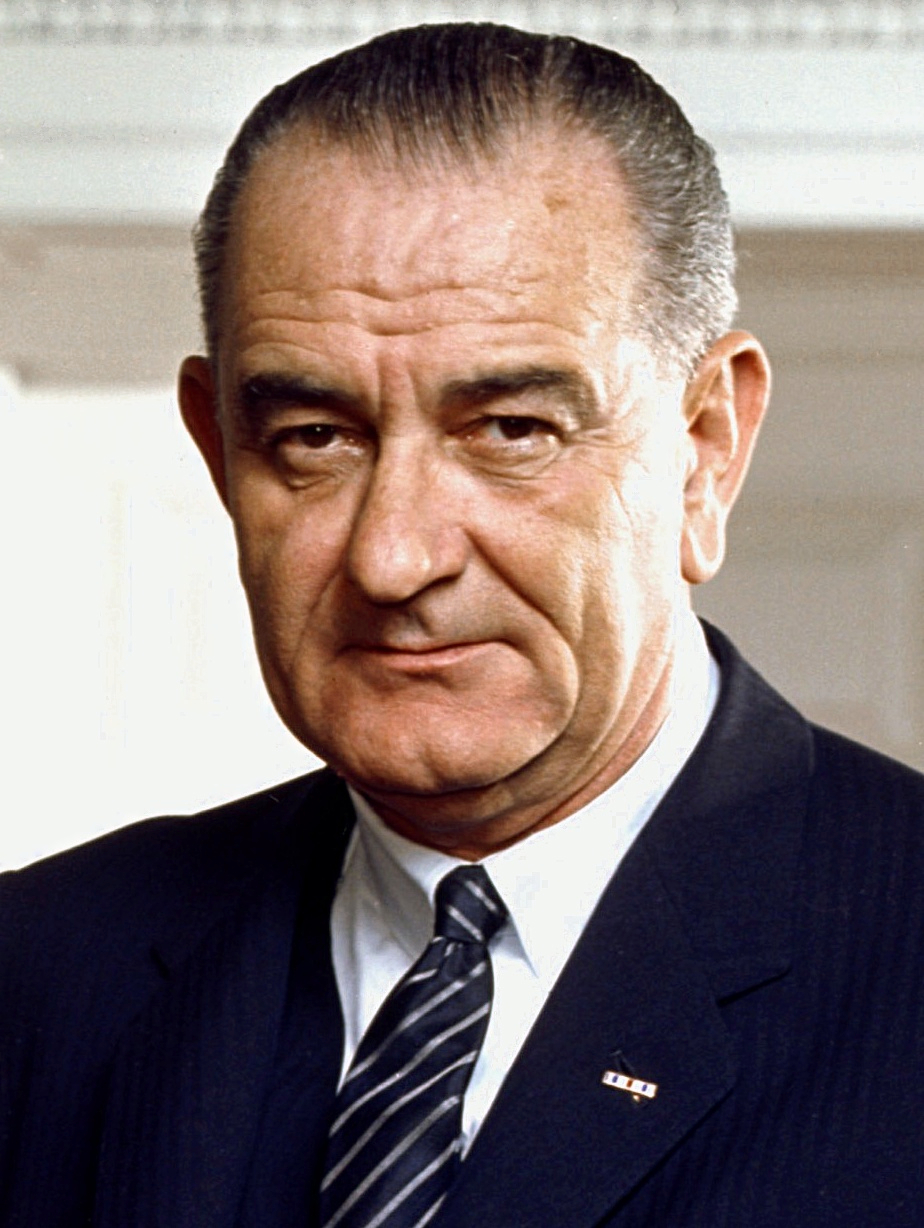

Nominee	Lyndon B. Johnson	Barry Goldwater
Party	Democratic	Republican
Home state	Texas	Arizona
Running mate	Hubert Humphrey	William E. Miller
Electoral vote	17	0
Popular vote	1,867,671	963,843
Percentage	65.61%	33.86%
County results
Johnson
50–60%
60–70%
70–80%
President before election
Lyndon B. Johnson
Democratic
Elected President
Lyndon B. Johnson
Democratic

The 1964 United States presidential election in New Jersey took place on November 3, 1964. All 50 states and the District of Columbia, were part of the 1964 United States presidential election. Voters chose 17 electors to the Electoral College, which selected the president and vice president.

New Jersey was won overwhelmingly by the Democratic nominees, incumbent President Lyndon B. Johnson of Texas and his running mate Senator Hubert H. Humphrey of Minnesota. Johnson and Humphrey defeated the Republican nominees, Senator Barry Goldwater of Arizona and his running mate Congressman William E. Miller of New York. This is the only time the Democratic nominee won each of New Jersey's 21 counties, and the second of two times that a Republican failed to win any county after 1912. This was the last time each county in New Jersey voted for the same presidential candidate until Republican President Richard Nixon's landslide 1972 re-election.

Johnson carried New Jersey in a landslide with 65.61% of the vote to Goldwater's 33.86%, a margin of 31.75%. Johnson also swept all twenty-one of New Jersey's counties, the only time a Democratic presidential nominee has ever done so. Johnson was the first Democrat to ever carry Ocean County since it was created in 1850. He was also the first Democrat since Woodrow Wilson in 1912 to carry Monmouth and Morris Counties and the first since Wilson in 1916 to carry Sussex County, whilst the counties of Bergen, Cape May, Hunterdon and Somerset went Democratic for the first time since FDR‘s 1936 landslide against Alf Landon.

Johnson broke 60% of the vote in 15 counties, and 70% in 4: Hudson, Mercer, Middlesex, and Cumberland, besides falling just short of the mark in Essex County, where Johnson received 69.9%. Hudson would be the most Democratic county, giving Johnson 73.5% of the vote. Goldwater’s strongest county was rural Sussex County, where he received 45.2% of the vote to Johnson’s 54.8%.

New Jersey in this era was usually a swing state with a slight Republican lean. But this normal pattern was broken in 1964, as Goldwater’s staunch conservatism led many moderate Northeastern Republicans to view Goldwater as an extremist and defect to the Democrats that year. As Johnson won a massive landslide nationally, normally GOP-leaning New Jersey’s result would even be almost 10% more Democratic than the national average. This was also the last time New Jersey would go to a Democratic candidate for president until 1992, after which the state has always gone Democratic.

== Primary elections ==
=== Republican primary ===
1964 New Jersey Republican presidential primary
- April 21, 1964
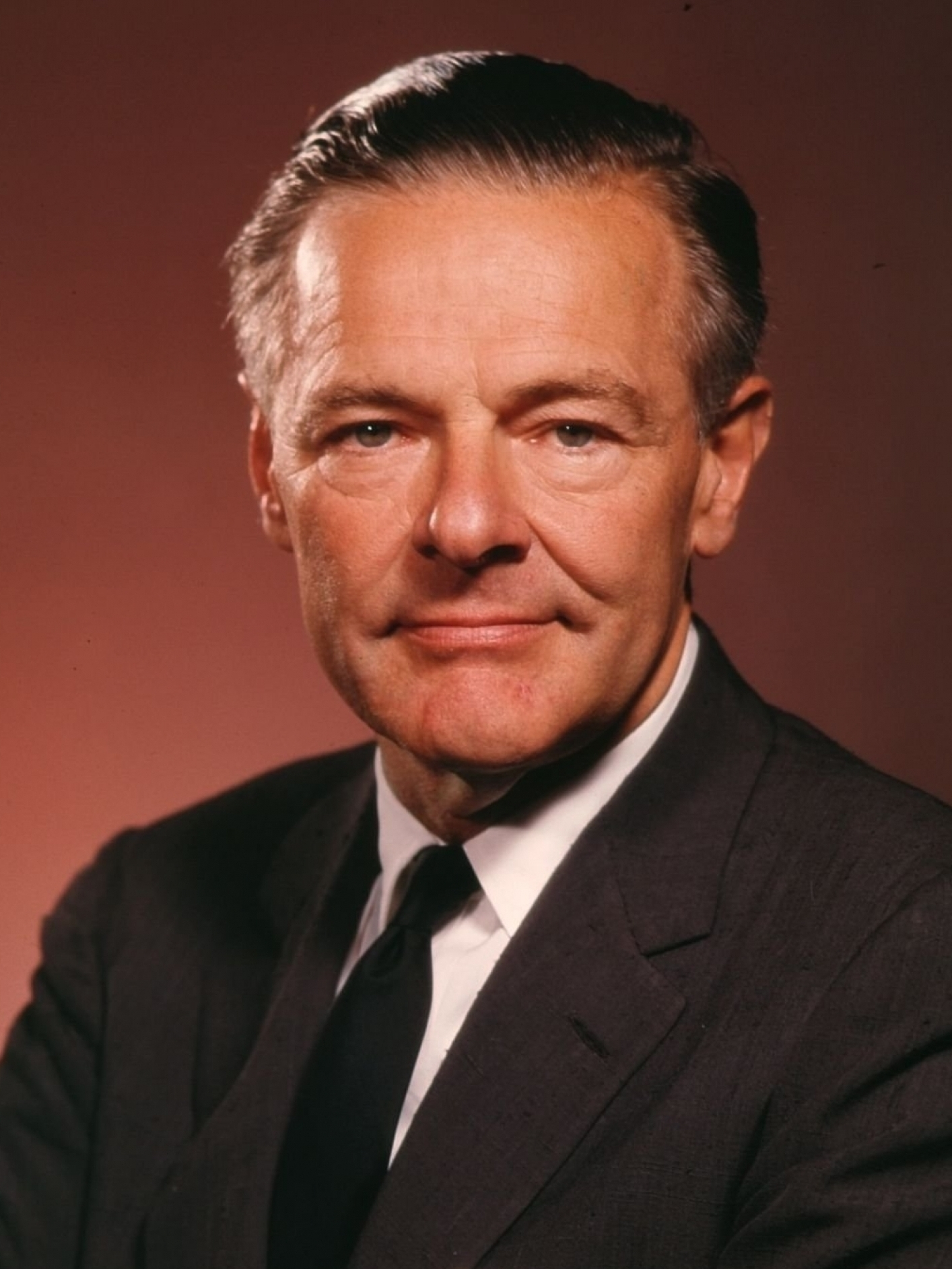

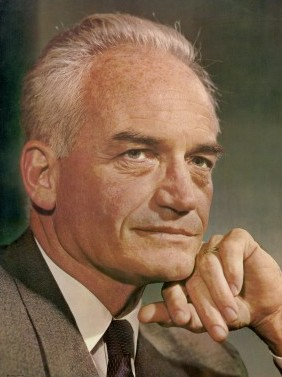

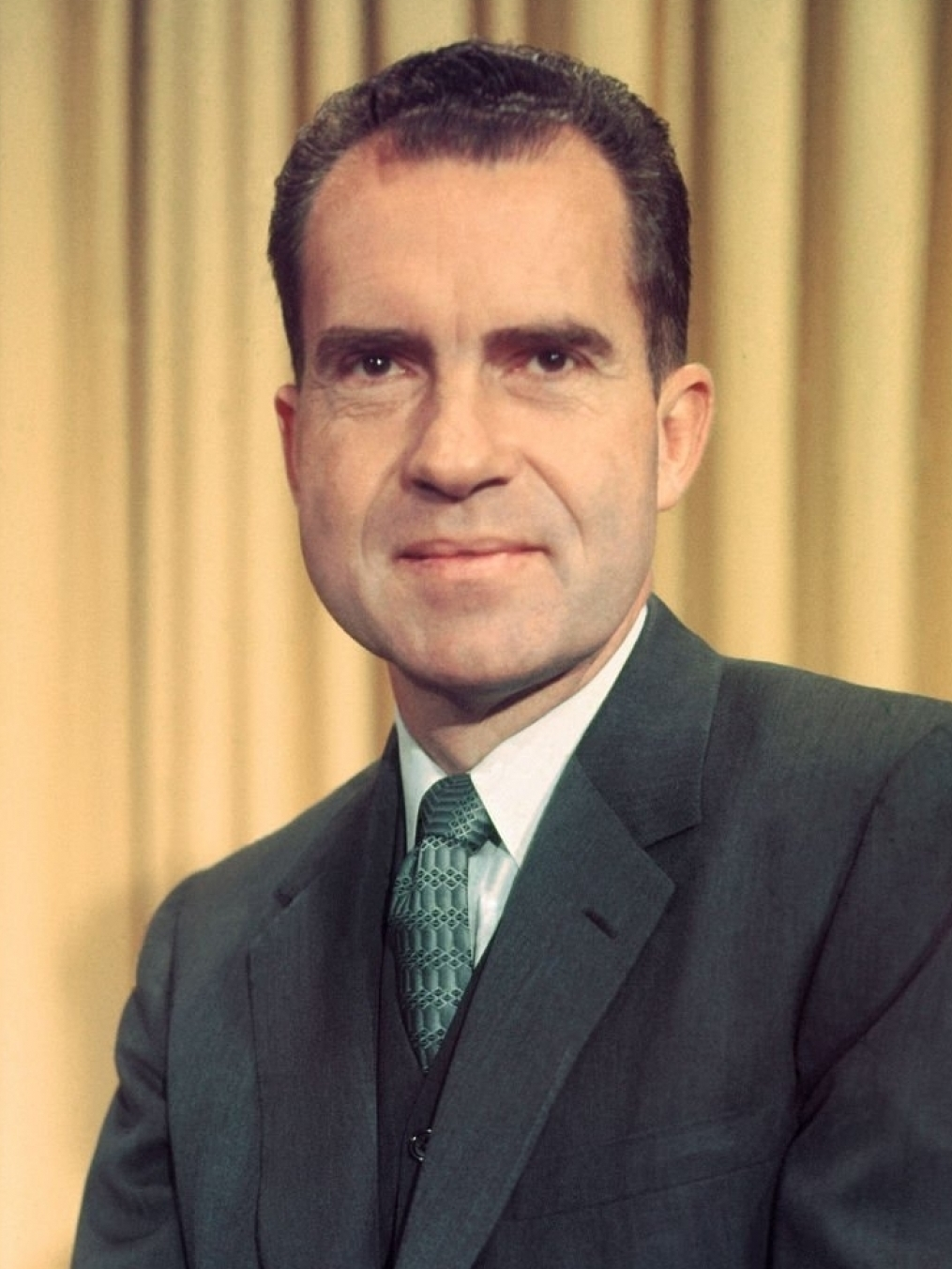
Candidate	Henry Cabot Lodge Jr. (write-in)	Barry Goldwater (write-in)	Richard Nixon (write-in)
Home state	Massachusetts	Arizona	California
Popular vote	7,896	5,309	4,179
Percentage	41.70%	28.04%	22.07%
County Results
Lodge
Goldwater
No Votes

The Republican primary took place on April 21, 1964. Former Ambassador to the United Nations Henry Cabot Lodge Jr. would win the primary as a write-in candidate, over Barry Goldwater and Richard Nixon

1964 New Jersey Republican presidential primary
Candidate	Votes	%
Henry Cabot Lodge (write-in)	7,896	41.70
Barry Goldwater (write-in)	5,309	28.04
Richard Nixon (write-in)	4,179	22.07
William Scranton (write-in)	633	3.34
Nelson Rockefeller (write-in)	612	3.23
George Wallace (write-in)	220	1.16
Lyndon B. Johnson (write-in)	84	0.44
Total	18,933	100.0

=== Democratic primary ===
1964 New Jersey Democratic presidential primary
- April 21, 1964
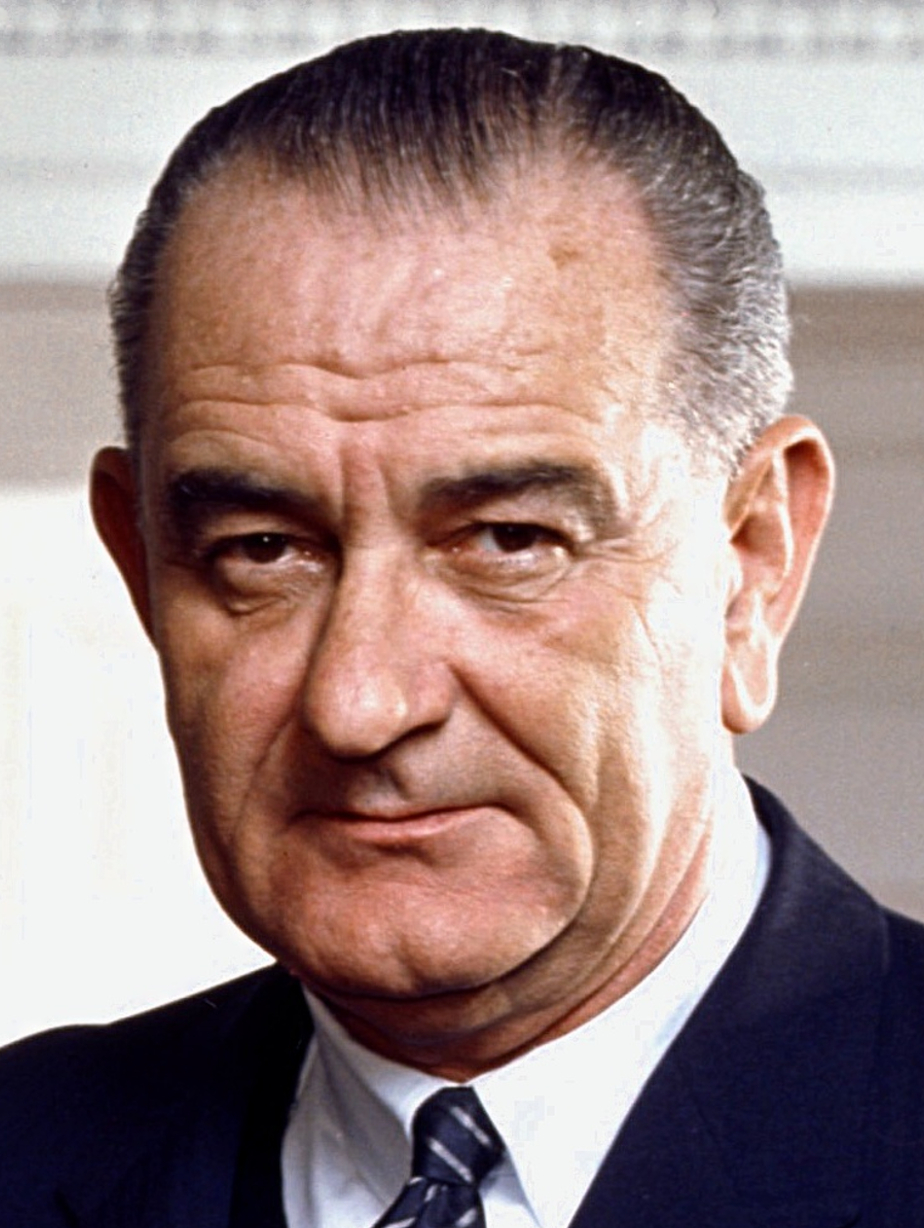

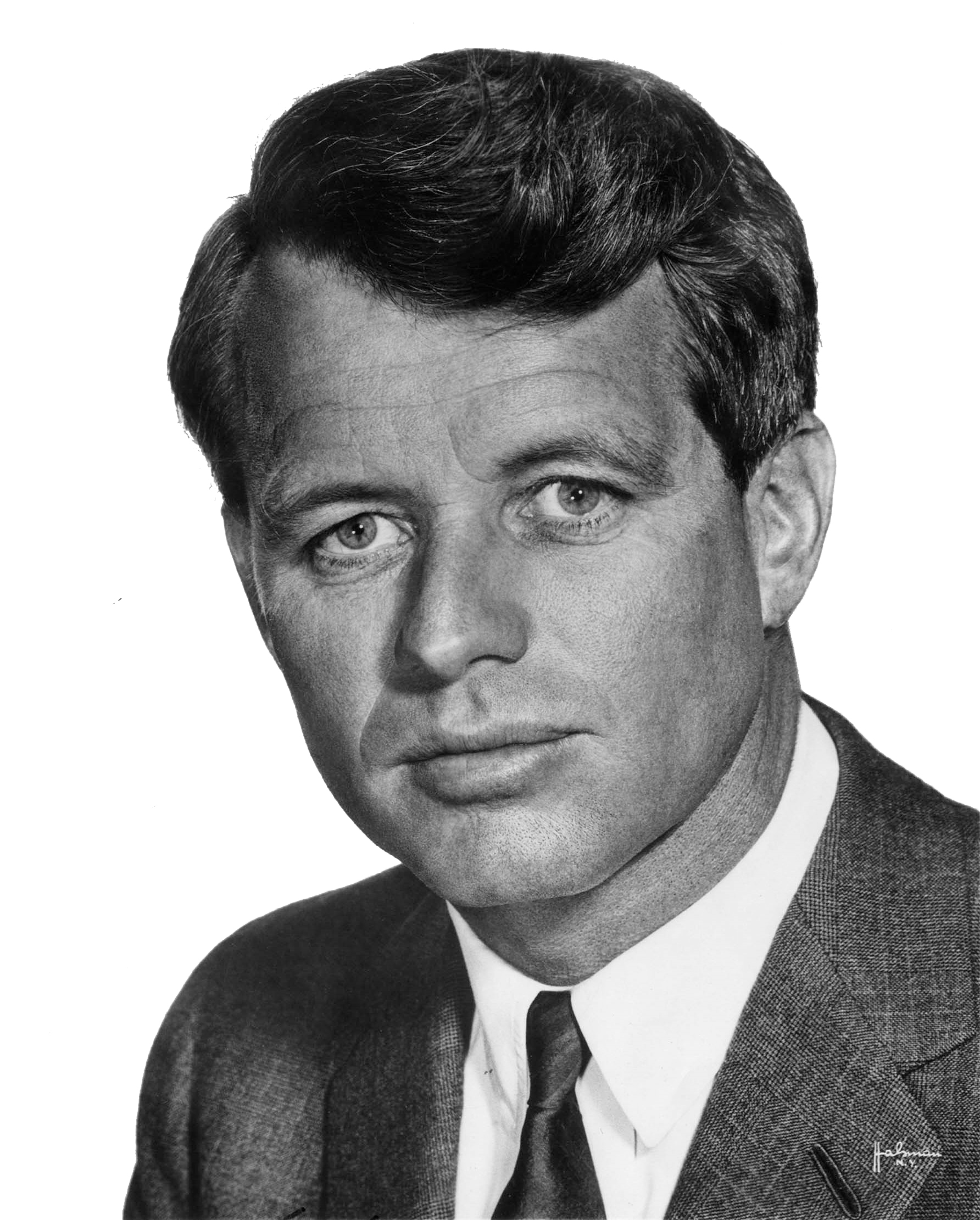
Candidate	Lyndon B. Johnson (write-in)	George Wallace (write-in)	Robert F. Kennedy (write-in)
Home state	Texas	Alabama	Massachusetts
Popular vote	4,863	491	431
Percentage	82.30%	8.31%	7.29%
County Results
Johnson
Wallace
Tie- Johnson/Kennedy
No Votes

The Democratic primary took place on April 21, 1964. Incumbent president Lyndon B. Johnson won the primary on a write-in campaign, as no candidate's names were on the ballot.

1964 New Jersey Democratic presidential primary
Candidate	Votes	%
Lyndon B. Johnson (incumbent, write-in)	4,863	82.30
George Wallace (write-in)	491	8.31
Robert Kennedy (write-in)	431	7.29
Henry Cabot Lodge (write-in)	69	1.17
Barry Goldwater (write-in)	30	0.51
Richard Nixon (write-in)	19	0.32
Nelson Rockefeller (write-in)	3	0.05
William Scranton (write-in)	3	0.05
Total	5,909	100.0

== Results ==
1964 United States presidential election in New Jersey
Party	Candidate	Votes	Percentage	Electoral votes
Democratic	Lyndon B. Johnson (incumbent)	1,867,671	65.61%	17
Republican	Barry Goldwater	963,843	33.86%	0
Socialist Workers	Clifton DeBerry	8,181	0.29%	0
Socialist Labor	Eric Hass	7,075	0.25%	0
Totals		2,846,770	100.0%	17
Voter Turnout (Voting age/Registered)				69%/88%

=== Results by county ===
County	Lyndon B. Johnson Democratic		Barry Goldwater Republican		Clifton DeBerry Socialist Workers		Eric Hass Socialist Labor		Margin		Total votes cast
County	#	%	#	%	#	%	#	%	#	%	Total votes cast
Atlantic	50,945	65.30%	25,626	32.85%	1,217	1.56%	231	0.30%	25,319	32.45%	78,019
Bergen	234,849	59.69%	157,899	40.13%	475	0.12%	242	0.06%	76,950	19.56%	393,465
Burlington	57,638	64.80%	31,215	35.09%	60	0.07%	32	0.04%	26,423	29.71%	88,945
Camden	124,620	67.09%	60,844	32.75%	47	0.03%	250	0.13%	63,776	34.34%	185,761
Cape May	14,943	56.65%	11,390	43.18%	13	0.05%	34	0.13%	3,553	13.47%	26,380
Cumberland	33,593	72.69%	12,611	27.29%	6	0.01%	5	0.01%	20,982	45.40%	46,215
Essex	277,042	69.88%	116,172	29.30%	385	0.10%	2,878	0.73%	160,870	40.58%	396,477
Gloucester	40,305	62.93%	23,702	37.00%	10	0.02%	35	0.05%	16,603	25.93%	64,052
Hudson	200,051	73.55%	69,515	25.56%	211	0.08%	2,232	0.82%	130,536	47.99%	272,009
Hunterdon	15,091	59.69%	10,173	40.24%	14	0.06%	5	0.02%	4,918	19.45%	25,283
Mercer	86,985	71.17%	35,081	28.70%	49	0.04%	99	0.08%	51,904	42.47%	122,214
Middlesex	151,196	70.12%	63,370	29.39%	840	0.39%	212	0.10%	87,826	40.73%	215,618
Monmouth	95,320	60.69%	61,367	39.07%	261	0.18%	107	0.07%	33,953	21.62%	157,055
Morris	73,684	57.16%	55,024	42.68%	125	0.10%	80	0.06%	18,660	14.48%	128,913
Ocean	36,892	57.90%	25,985	40.78%	764	1.20%	73	0.11%	10,907	17.12%	63,714
Passaic	113,919	63.39%	63,114	35.12%	2,362	1.31%	304	0.17%	50,805	28.27%	179,699
Salem	17,846	67.23%	8,682	32.71%	9	0.03%	8	0.03%	9,164	34.52%	26,545
Somerset	43,659	60.41%	28,416	39.32%	150	0.21%	45	0.06%	15,243	21.09%	72,270
Sussex	14,349	54.77%	11,836	45.18%	3	0.01%	9	0.03%	2,513	9.59%	26,197
Union	164,989	66.17%	82,999	33.29%	1,178	0.47%	181	0.07%	81,990	32.88%	249,347
Warren	19,755	69.09%	8,822	30.85%	2	0.01%	13	0.05%	10,933	38.24%	28,592
Totals	1,867,671	65.61%	963,843	33.86%	8,181	0.29%	7,075	0.25%	903,828	31.75%	2,846,770

==== Counties that flipped from Republican to Democratic ====
- Atlantic
- Bergen
- Burlington
- Cape May
- Gloucester
- Hunterdon
- Monmouth
- Morris
- Ocean
- Salem
- Somerset
- Sussex
- Union
- Warren

== Analysis ==
As of the 2024 election, this is the last election in which Sussex County, Hunterdon County, and Warren County voted for a Democratic presidential candidate. Union County would not vote Democratic again until 1992. Bergen, Passaic, Ocean, Monmouth, and Cape May Counties would not vote Democratic again until 1996. Somerset County did not vote Democratic again until 2008, and Morris County would not vote Democratic again until 2020. As of 2020, this remains the strongest ever performance by a Democratic presidential nominee in New Jersey, the second strongest ever performance by a nominee of either party after Warren G. Harding in 1920. This also remains the last time New Jersey voted to the left of Maryland.

== See also ==
- United States presidential elections in New Jersey
- Presidency of Lyndon B. Johnson
