= 1936 United States presidential election in New Jersey =

- November 3, 1936
- Turnout: 84.72% (▲1.89%)

Nominee	Franklin D. Roosevelt	Alf Landon
Party	Democratic	Republican
Home state	New York	Kansas
Running mate	John Nance Garner	Frank Knox
Electoral vote	16	0
Popular vote	1,083,850	720,322
Percentage	59.54%	39.57%
County results
Roosevelt
50–60%
60–70%
70–80%
Landon
50–60%
President before election
Franklin D. Roosevelt
Democratic
Elected President
Franklin D. Roosevelt
Democratic

The 1936 United States presidential election in New Jersey took place on November 3, 1936. All contemporary 48 states were part of the 1936 United States presidential election. Voters chose 16 electors to the Electoral College, which selected the president and vice president.

New Jersey was won by the Democratic nominees, incumbent President Franklin D. Roosevelt of New York and his running mate incumbent Vice President John Nance Garner of Texas. Roosevelt and Garner defeated the Republican nominees, Governor Alf Landon of Kansas and his running mate newspaper publisher Frank Knox of Illinois. Roosevelt decisively carried New Jersey with 59.54 percent of the vote to Landon's 39.57 percent, a victory margin of 19.97 percent.

Reflecting the decisiveness of his statewide victory, Roosevelt carried 17 of the New Jersey's 21 counties with majorities of the vote, breaking 60% of the vote in five. This result represented dramatic gains from 1932, when Roosevelt narrowly carried the state by less than 2 points, and won only four counties. In 1932, Roosevelt had won majorities in populous Middlesex County and rural Warren County, along with a plurality win in Passaic County, but much of Roosevelt's margin of victory was provided by a landslide win in heavily populated Hudson County. Roosevelt had received more than 70% of the vote in Hudson County, part of the New York City metro area.

In 1936, Roosevelt again broke 70% of the vote in Hudson County, but this time thirteen other counties flipped from voting for Herbert Hoover in 1932 to Roosevelt in 1936, enabling him to win the state with a much more comfortable 20 point margin. In North Jersey, Roosevelt won all but two out of the ten northernmost counties. Besides his landslide win in Hudson County, Roosevelt also received more than 60% of the vote in Middlesex and Mercer Counties and won majorities in seven other counties. Landon won only rural Sussex and Morris counties. Roosevelt decisively swept South Jersey, winning majorities in all seven of the southernmost counties in the state. Landon fared better in Central Jersey, where he won Monmouth and Ocean counties.

New Jersey in the early decades of the 20th century had been a reliably Republican state; prior to FDR's 1936 victory, the state had not given a majority of the vote to a Democratic presidential candidate since 1892, with FDR only winning the state with a bare plurality in 1932. However, in 1936, with the emergence of the New Deal Coalition, FDR made dramatic gains for the Democratic Party in New Jersey that would endure and transform it into a closely divided swing state with only a slight Republican lean, a pattern that would endure for much of the 20th century until New Jersey ultimately became a solidly Democratic state in the 1990s. The 1936 election would be the first of many elections to conform to that pattern, with the results making the state about 4 points more Republican than the nation.

Roosevelt was the first Democratic victor in Cumberland County since James Buchanan in 1856, and the first in Essex County since Grover Cleveland in 1892. He was the first to win Hunterdon County since 1916, and the first to win Bergen, Union, Somerset, Mercer, Burlington, Camden, Gloucester, Atlantic, Cape May, and Salem counties since 1912.

== Results ==
1936 United States presidential election in New Jersey
Party	Candidate	Votes	Percentage	Electoral votes
Democratic	Franklin D. Roosevelt (incumbent)	1,083,850	59.54%	16
Republican	Alf Landon	720,322	39.57%	0
National Union	William Lemke	9,407	0.52%	0
Socialist	Norman Thomas	3,931	0.22%	0
Communist	Earl Browder	1,639	0.09%	0
National Prohibition	D. Leigh Colvin	926	0.05%	0
Socialist Labor	John W. Aiken	362	0.02%	0
Totals		1,820,437	100.0%	16

=== Results by county ===
County	Franklin D. Roosevelt Democratic		Alf Landon Republican		William F. Lemke National Union		Norman M. Thomas Socialist		Various candidates Other parties		Margin		Total votes cast
County	#	%	#	%	#	%	#	%	#	%	#	%	Total votes cast
Atlantic	39,605	61.22%	24,680	38.15%	296	0.46%	47	0.07%	60	0.09%	14,925	23.07%	64,688
Bergen	91,107	50.09%	89,628	49.28%	530	0.29%	461	0.25%	152	0.08%	1,479	0.81%	181,878
Burlington	26,095	57.78%	18,644	41.29%	239	0.53%	103	0.23%	78	0.17%	7,451	16.50%	45,159
Camden	86,300	69.74%	35,874	28.99%	757	0.61%	511	0.41%	300	0.24%	50,426	40.75%	123,742
Cape May	9,363	52.16%	8,531	47.52%	23	0.13%	16	0.09%	19	0.11%	832	4.63%	17,952
Cumberland	20,492	58.06%	14,500	41.09%	74	0.21%	63	0.18%	163	0.46%	5,992	16.98%	35,292
Essex	174,857	54.74%	140,991	44.14%	2,364	0.74%	714	0.22%	515	0.16%	33,866	10.60%	319,441
Gloucester	20,516	56.02%	15,813	43.18%	88	0.24%	70	0.19%	135	0.37%	4,703	12.84%	36,622
Hudson	233,390	77.65%	65,110	21.66%	1,259	0.42%	531	0.18%	269	0.09%	168,280	55.99%	300,559
Hunterdon	9,526	51.75%	8,832	47.98%	1	0.01%	20	0.11%	30	0.16%	694	3.77%	18,409
Mercer	47,702	61.52%	29,283	37.77%	293	0.38%	151	0.19%	105	0.14%	18,419	23.76%	77,534
Middlesex	61,679	64.69%	32,959	34.57%	489	0.51%	92	0.10%	121	0.13%	28,720	30.12%	95,340
Monmouth	38,914	48.18%	41,460	51.33%	228	0.28%	98	0.12%	67	0.08%	-2,546	-3.15%	80,767
Morris	24,978	43.11%	32,365	55.86%	300	0.52%	211	0.36%	89	0.15%	-7,387	-12.75%	57,943
Ocean	9,889	46.27%	11,293	52.84%	117	0.55%	31	0.15%	42	0.20%	-1,404	-6.57%	21,372
Passaic	71,384	58.42%	49,046	40.14%	1,113	0.91%	308	0.25%	339	0.28%	22,338	18.28%	122,190
Salem	11,614	59.86%	7,671	39.54%	31	0.16%	36	0.19%	50	0.26%	3,943	20.32%	19,402
Somerset	15,987	50.14%	15,806	49.57%	15	0.05%	35	0.11%	44	0.14%	181	0.57%	31,887
Sussex	6,862	46.17%	7,945	53.46%	25	0.17%	10	0.07%	19	0.13%	-1,083	-7.29%	14,861
Union	70,813	53.61%	59,553	45.08%	1,162	0.88%	363	0.27%	206	0.16%	11,260	8.52%	132,097
Warren	12,476	56.82%	9,437	42.98%	1	0.00%	24	0.11%	19	0.09%	3,039	13.84%	21,957
Totals	1,083,549	59.56%	719,421	39.55%	9,405	0.52%	3,895	0.21%	2,852	0.16%	364,128	20.02%	1,819,122

==== Counties that flipped from Republican to Democratic ====
- Cape May
- Cumberland
- Atlantic
- Salem
- Gloucester
- Camden
- Burlington
- Mercer
- Hunterdon
- Essex
- Bergen
- Somerset
- Union

== See also ==
- Presidency of Franklin D. Roosevelt
- United States presidential elections in New Jersey
