= 1876 United States presidential election in New Jersey =

- November 7, 1876
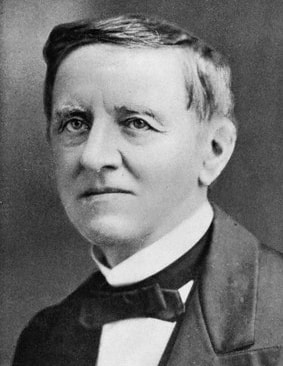

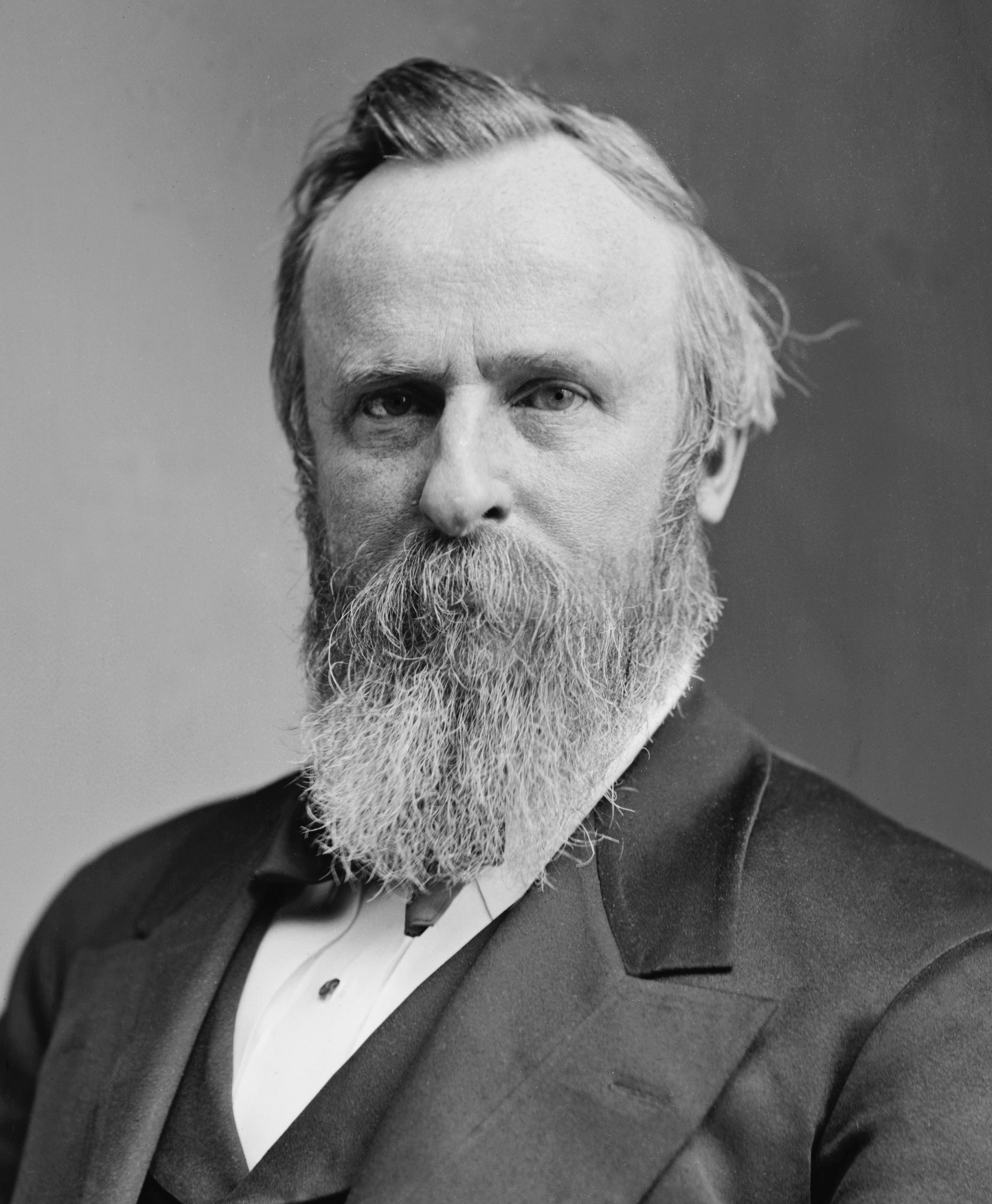
| Nominee | Samuel J. Tilden | Rutherford B. Hayes |
| Party | Democratic | Republican |
| Home state | New York | Ohio |
| Running mate | Thomas A. Hendricks | William A. Wheeler |
| Electoral vote | 9 | 0 |
| Popular vote | 115,962 | 103,517 |
| Percentage | 52.66% | 47.01% |
County results
Tilden
50–60%
60–70%
Hayes
50–60%
President before election
Ulysses S. Grant
Republican
Elected President
Rutherford B. Hayes
Republican

The 1876 United States presidential election in New Jersey took place on November 7, 1876, as part of the 1876 United States presidential election. Voters chose nine representatives, or electors to the Electoral College, who voted for president and vice president.

New Jersey voted for the Democratic nominee, Samuel J. Tilden, over the Republican nominee, Rutherford B. Hayes. Tilden won the state by a narrow margin of 5.65%.

== Results ==
1876 United States presidential election in New Jersey
| Party | Candidate | Running mate | Popular vote | | Electoral vote | |
| Party | Candidate | Running mate | Count | % | Count | % |
|---|---|---|---|---|---|---|
| Democratic | Samuel J. Tilden of New York | Thomas A. Hendricks of Indiana | 115,962 | 52.66% | 9 | 100.00% |
| Republican | Rutherford B. Hayes of Ohio | William A. Wheeler of New York | 103,517 | 47.01% | 0 | 0.00% |
| Greenback | Peter Cooper of New York | Samuel Fenton Cary of Ohio | 714 | 0.32% | 0 | 0.00% |
| Total | | | 220,193 | 100.00% | 9 | 100.00% |

=== Results by county ===
| County | Samuel Jones Tilden Democratic | | Rutherford Birchard Hayes Republican | | Peter Cooper Greenback | | Margin | | Total votes cast |
| County | # | % | # | % | # | % | # | % | Total votes cast |
|---|---|---|---|---|---|---|---|---|---|
| Atlantic | 1,440 | 46.09% | 1,667 | 53.36% | 17 | 0.54% | -227 | -7.27% | 3,124 |
| Bergen | 4,357 | 57.25% | 3,253 | 42.75% | 0 | 0.00% | 1,104 | 14.50% | 7,610 |
| Burlington | 6,468 | 50.13% | 6,402 | 49.62% | 33 | 0.26% | 66 | 0.51% | 12,903 |
| Camden | 5,200 | 44.11% | 6,563 | 55.67% | 26 | 0.22% | -1,363 | -11.56% | 11,789 |
| Cape May | 866 | 45.08% | 1,055 | 54.92% | 0 | 0.00% | -189 | -9.84% | 1,921 |
| Cumberland | 3,399 | 44.41% | 3,944 | 51.53% | 311 | 4.06% | -545 | -7.12% | 7,654 |
| Essex | 16,132 | 47.02% | 18,037 | 52.57% | 141 | 0.41% | -1,905 | -5.55% | 34,310 |
| Gloucester | 2,577 | 45.04% | 3,006 | 52.54% | 138 | 2.41% | -429 | -7.50% | 5,721 |
| Hudson | 17,764 | 61.83% | 10,958 | 38.14% | 9 | 0.03% | 6,806 | 23.69% | 28,731 |
| Hunterdon | 5,781 | 60.92% | 3,709 | 39.08% | 0 | 0.00% | 2,072 | 21.83% | 9,490 |
| Mercer | 6,035 | 49.76% | 6,088 | 50.20% | 4 | 0.03% | -53 | -0.44% | 12,127 |
| Middlesex | 5,846 | 52.68% | 5,243 | 47.25% | 8 | 0.07% | 603 | 5.53% | 11,097 |
| Monmouth | 6,942 | 59.54% | 4,709 | 40.39% | 8 | 0.07% | 2,233 | 19.15% | 11,659 |
| Morris | 5,118 | 49.68% | 5,183 | 50.31% | 0 | 0.00% | -65 | -0.63% | 10,301 |
| Ocean | 1,563 | 45.90% | 1,834 | 53.86% | 8 | 0.23% | -271 | -7.96% | 3,405 |
| Passaic | 5,304 | 48.15% | 5,708 | 51.82% | 3 | 0.03% | -404 | -3.67% | 11,015 |
| Salem | 2,843 | 48.96% | 2,952 | 50.84% | 12 | 0.21% | -109 | -1.88% | 5,807 |
| Somerset | 3,179 | 51.37% | 3,009 | 48.62% | 1 | 0.02% | 170 | 2.75% | 6,189 |
| Sussex | 3,706 | 64.53% | 2,037 | 35.47% | 0 | 0.00% | 1,669 | 29.06% | 5,743 |
| Union | 5,994 | 53.86% | 5,134 | 46.14% | 0 | 0.00% | 860 | 7.72% | 11,128 |
| Warren | 5,442 | 64.32% | 3,016 | 35.65% | 3 | 0.04% | 2,426 | 28.67% | 8,461 |
| Totals | 115,962 | 52.66% | 103,517 | 47.01% | 722 | 0.33% | 12,445 | 5.65% | 220,185 |

== See also ==
- United States presidential elections in New Jersey
