= 1992 United States presidential election in New Jersey =

- November 3, 1992
- Turnout: 82.48% (▲5.13%)

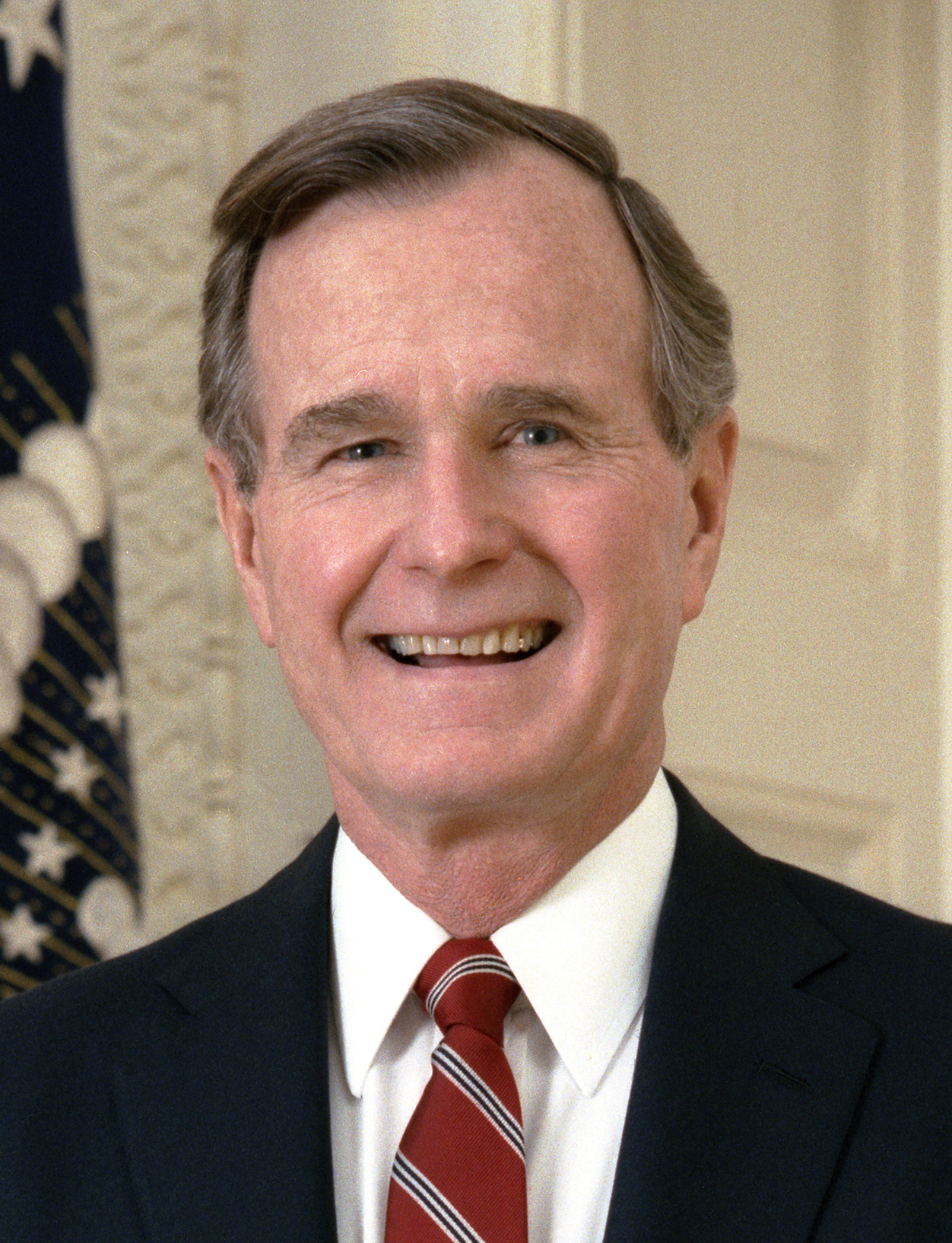

Nominee	Bill Clinton	George H. W. Bush	Ross Perot
Party	Democratic	Republican	Independent
Home state	Arkansas	Texas	Texas
Running mate	Al Gore	Dan Quayle	James Stockdale
Electoral vote	15	0	0
Popular vote	1,436,206	1,356,865	521,829
Percentage	42.95%	40.58%	15.61%
County results
Clinton
40–50%
50–60%
Bush
30–40%
40–50%
50–60%
President before election
George H. W. Bush
Republican
Elected President
Bill Clinton
Democratic

The 1992 United States presidential election in New Jersey took place on November 3, 1992, as part of the 1992 United States presidential election. Voters chose 15 representatives, or electors to the Electoral College, who voted for president and vice president.

New Jersey was won by Governor Bill Clinton (D-Arkansas) with 42.95% of the popular vote over incumbent President George H. W. Bush (R-Texas) with 40.58%, a 2.37% margin of victory. Businessman Ross Perot (I-Texas) finished in third, with 15.61% of the popular vote. Clinton ultimately won the national vote, defeating incumbent President Bush.

At the time New Jersey was still considered a Republican-leaning swing state, and Clinton won very narrowly over President Bush. Clinton's win marked the first time a Democrat won New Jersey since Lyndon Johnson's landslide win in 1964. Indeed, this was the last time New Jersey voted to the right of its swing state neighbor Pennsylvania.

This was the third time New Jersey voted Democratic since the end of World War II. After this election, despite the very slim margin for this year, the Democrat would always win New Jersey by more than 10 points, except in 2004, when John Kerry's margin was just under 7 points, and 2024, when Kamala Harris's margin was just under 6 points.

As of 2024, this is the last presidential race where Bergen County voted Republican. Passaic County would not vote Republican in a presidential race again until 2024. 1992 was also the last presidential race up until 2024 when the Republican candidate would win a majority of the state's counties. In addition, this was also the last presidential election where New Jersey voted to the right of the country as a whole.

== Results ==
1992 United States presidential election in New Jersey
Party	Candidate	Votes	Percentage	Electoral votes
Democratic	Bill Clinton	1,436,206	42.95%	15
Republican	George H. W. Bush (incumbent)	1,356,865	40.58%	0
Independent	Ross Perot	521,829	15.61%	0
Libertarian	Andre Marrou	6,822	0.20%	0
Independent	Drew Bradford	4,749	0.14%	0
New Alliance	Lenora Fulani	3,513	0.11%	0
U.S. Taxpayers'	Howard Phillips	2,670	0.08%	0
Six Million Jobs	Lyndon LaRouche	2,095	0.06%	0
Socialist Workers	James Warren	2,011	0.06%	0
Peace and Freedom	Ron Daniels	1,996	0.06%	0
America First	James "Bo" Gritz	1,867	0.06%	0
Socialist Equality	Helen Halyard	1,618	0.05%	0
Natural Law	Dr. John Hagelin	1,353	0.04%	0
Totals		3,343,594	100.0%	15
Voter Turnout (Voting age/Registered)				56%/82%

=== Results by county ===
County	Bill Clinton Democratic		George H.W. Bush Republican		Ross Perot Independent		Various candidates Other parties		Margin		Total votes cast
County	#	%	#	%	#	%	#	%	#	%	Total votes cast
Atlantic	39,633	43.89%	34,279	37.96%	15,890	17.60%	496	0.55%	5,354	5.93%	90,298
Bergen	171,104	42.44%	178,223	44.21%	52,082	12.92%	1,728	0.43%	-7,119	-1.77%	403,137
Burlington	72,845	42.02%	63,709	36.75%	35,322	20.38%	1,481	0.85%	9,136	5.27%	173,357
Camden	104,915	49.75%	67,205	31.87%	37,144	17.61%	1,622	0.77%	37,710	17.88%	210,886
Cape May	17,324	35.46%	21,502	44.01%	9,798	20.05%	232	0.47%	-4,178	-8.55%	48,856
Cumberland	22,220	42.64%	19,253	36.94%	9,901	19.00%	742	1.42%	2,967	5.70%	52,116
Essex	158,130	57.12%	89,146	32.20%	26,961	9.74%	2,621	0.95%	68,984	24.92%	276,858
Gloucester	42,425	40.55%	37,335	35.69%	24,132	23.07%	727	0.69%	5,090	4.86%	104,619
Hudson	99,799	53.93%	66,505	35.94%	14,569	7.87%	4,184	2.26%	33,294	17.99%	185,057
Hunterdon	15,423	28.57%	25,130	46.56%	12,736	23.60%	685	1.27%	-9,707	-17.99%	53,974
Mercer	71,383	49.14%	50,473	34.75%	22,503	15.49%	901	0.62%	20,910	14.39%	145,260
Middlesex	128,824	45.16%	108,701	38.10%	45,055	15.79%	2,691	0.94%	20,123	7.06%	285,271
Monmouth	101,750	38.24%	117,715	44.23%	45,445	17.08%	1,206	0.45%	-15,965	-5.99%	266,116
Morris	67,593	32.31%	108,431	51.82%	32,447	15.51%	761	0.36%	-40,838	-19.51%	209,232
Ocean	75,431	34.88%	95,984	44.39%	41,668	19.27%	3,160	1.46%	-20,553	-9.51%	216,243
Passaic	70,030	42.47%	71,147	43.15%	21,494	13.04%	2,217	1.34%	-1,117	-0.68%	164,888
Salem	10,062	36.02%	10,363	37.10%	7,274	26.04%	236	0.84%	-301	-1.08%	27,935
Somerset	42,867	35.48%	56,044	46.39%	21,014	17.39%	888	0.74%	-13,177	-10.91%	120,813
Sussex	14,775	25.89%	29,510	51.71%	12,537	21.97%	242	0.42%	-14,735	-25.82%	57,064
Union	96,671	46.01%	87,742	41.76%	23,991	11.42%	1,708	0.81%	8,929	4.25%	210,112
Warren	13,002	31.33%	18,468	44.50%	9,866	23.77%	166	0.40%	-5,466	-13.17%	41,502
Totals	1,436,206	42.95%	1,356,865	40.58%	521,829	15.61%	28,694	0.86%	79,341	2.37%	3,343,594

Counties that flipped from Republican to Democratic

- Atlantic
- Burlington
- Camden
- Cumberland
- Gloucester
- Middlesex
- Union

=== Results by congressional district ===
Clinton carried 8 of the 13 congressional districts, including one held by a Republican.

District	Clinton	Bush	Perot
1st	48.3%	32.0%	19.7%
2nd	40.7%	39.0%	20.3%
3rd	40.4%	40.1%	19.4%
4th	39.6%	41.3%	19.1%
5th	33.9%	49.6%	16.5%
6th	44.1%	39.2%	16.7%
7th	41.1%	44.5%	14.4%
8th	45.7%	42.5%	11.8%
9th	47.8%	39.9%	12.3%
10th	72.1%	20.4%	8.4%
11th	32.8%	51.6%	15.6%
12th	40.2%	43.2%	16.6%
13th	54.4%	37.0%	8.6%
Total	100%	100%	100%

== See also ==
- United States presidential elections in New Jersey
- Presidency of Bill Clinton
