= 1856 United States presidential election in New Jersey =

- November 4, 1856
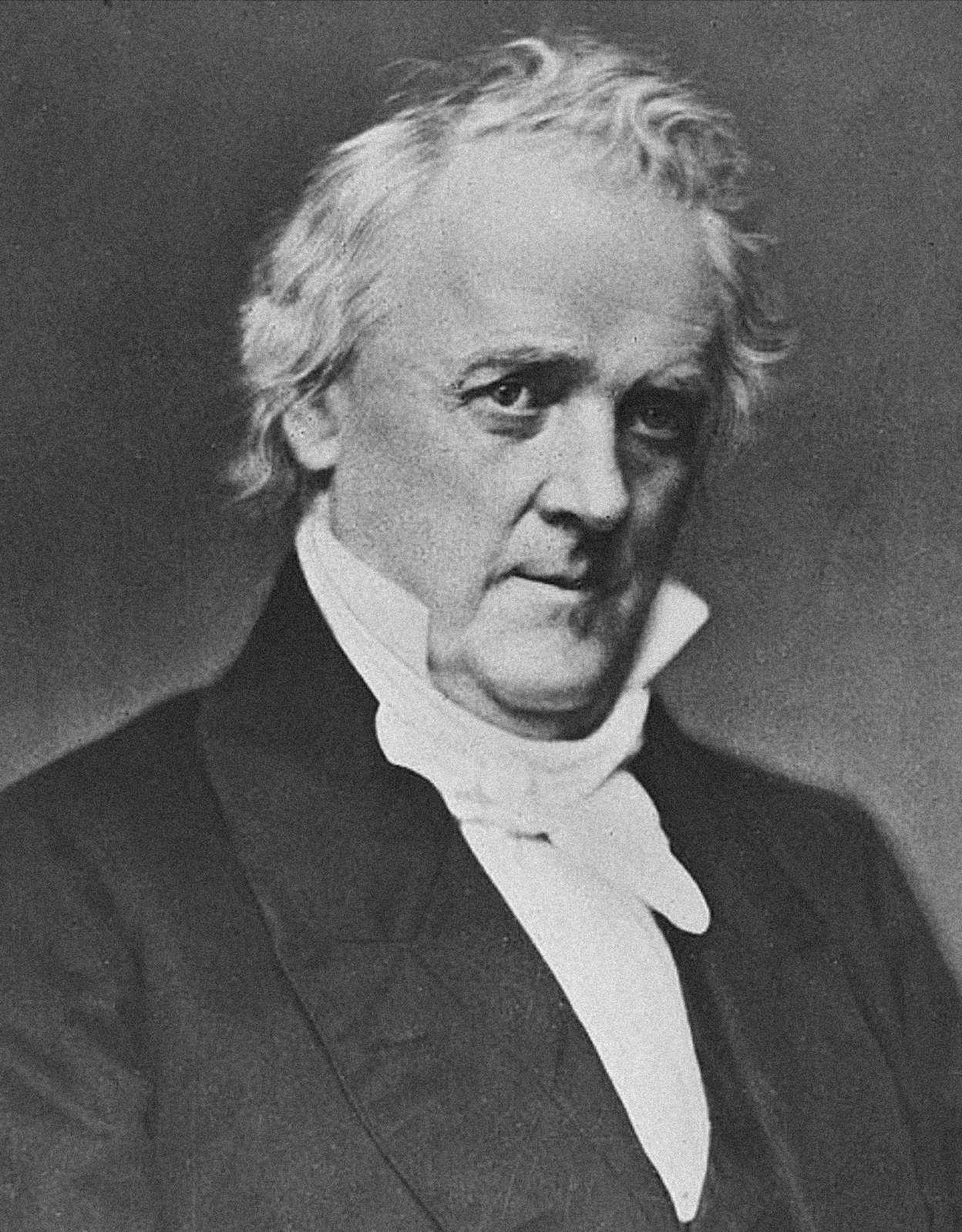

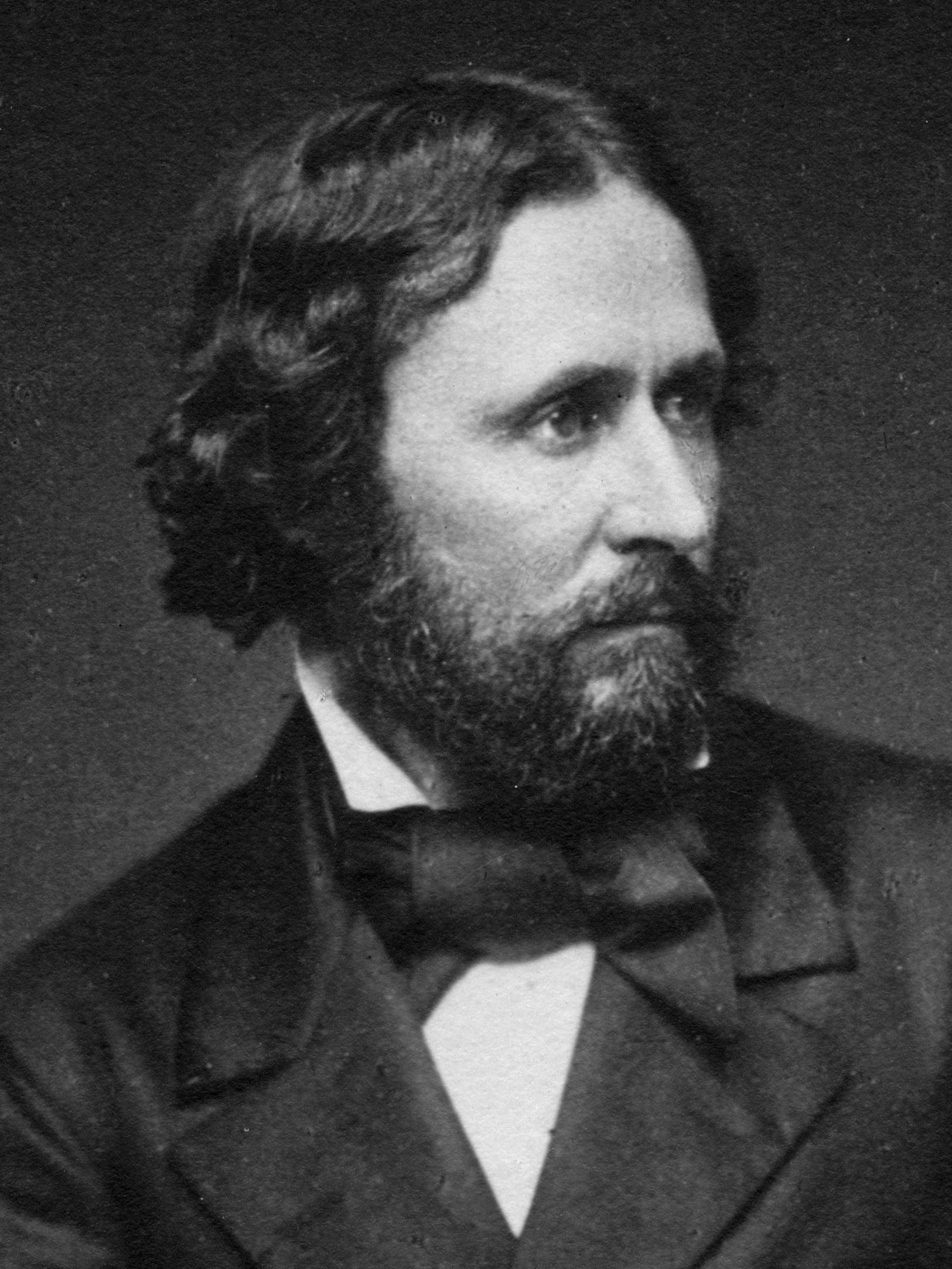

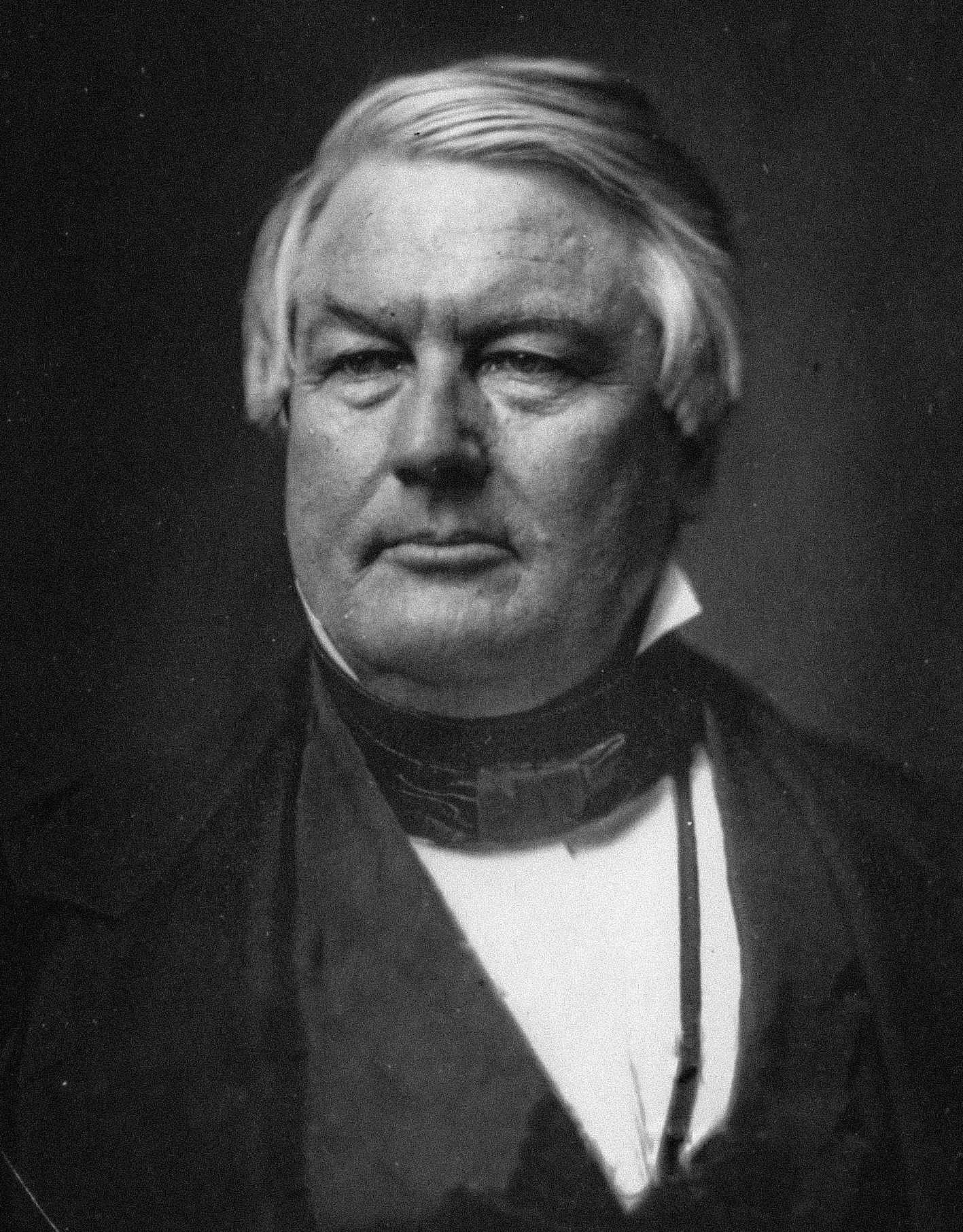
Nominee	James Buchanan	John C. Frémont	Millard Fillmore
Party	Democratic	Republican	Know Nothing
Home state	Pennsylvania	California	New York
Running mate	John C. Breckinridge	William L. Dayton	Andrew Jackson Donelson
Electoral vote	7	0	0
Popular vote	46,943	28,338	24,115
Percentage	47.23%	28.51%	24.26%
County results
Buchanan
40–50%
50–60%
60–70%
Frémont
50–60%
Fillmore
40–50%
50–60%
President before election
Franklin Pierce
Democratic
Elected President
James Buchanan
Democratic

The 1856 United States presidential election in New Jersey took place on November 4, 1856, as part of the 1856 United States presidential election. Voters chose seven representatives, or electors to the Electoral College, who voted for president and vice president.

New Jersey voted for the Democratic candidate, James Buchanan, over Republican candidate, John C. Frémont, and the Know Nothing candidate, Millard Fillmore. Buchanan won the state by a margin of 18.72 percentage points, despite New Jersey being the home state of the Republican vice presidential candidate. Buchanan would be the last Democratic presidential candidate to carry Cumberland County until Franklin D. Roosevelt in 1936, and the last to carry Passaic County until Roosevelt in 1932.

== Results ==
1856 United States presidential election in New Jersey
Party	Candidate	Running mate	Popular vote		Electoral vote	
Party	Candidate	Running mate	Count	%	Count	%
Democratic	James Buchanan of Pennsylvania	John C. Breckinridge of Kentucky	46,943	47.23%	7	100.00%
Republican	John C. Frémont of California	William L. Dayton of New Jersey	28,338	28.51%	0	0.00%
Know Nothing	Millard Fillmore of New York	Andrew Jackson Donelson of Tennessee	24,115	24.26%	0	0.00%
Total			99,396	100.00%	7	100.00%

=== Results by County ===
1856 United States Presidential Election in New Jersey (By County)
County	James Buchanan Democratic		John C. Frémont Republican		Millard Fillmore Know Nothing		Total Votes Cast
County	#	%	#	%	#	%	Total Votes Cast
Atlantic	684	49.17%	547	39.32%	160	11.50%	1,391
Bergen	1,548	55.66%	436	15.68%	797	28.66%	2,781
Burlington	3,682	43.76%	3,149	37.42%	1,584	18.82%	8,415
Camden	1,766	37.81%	817	17.49%	2,088	44.70%	4,671
Cape May	312	31.64%	177	17.95%	497	50.41%	986
Cumberland	1,574	45.66%	642	18.62%	1,231	35.71%	3,447
Essex	6,845	42.93%	4,760	29.86%	4,338	27.21%	15,943
Gloucester	986	32.81%	639	21.26%	1,380	45.92%	3,005
Hudson	2,574	45.26%	1,702	29.93%	1,411	24.81%	5,687
Hunterdon	3,496	56.79%	1,554	25.24%	1,106	17.97%	6,156
Mercer	2,857	47.02%	2,155	35.47%	1,064	17.51%	6,076
Middlesex	2,468	43.57%	1,209	21.34%	1,988	35.09%	5,665
Monmouth	3,319	54.08%	1,003	16.34%	1,815	29.57%	6,137
Morris	3,008	50.02%	2,310	38.41%	696	11.57%	6,014
Ocean	660	35.56%	892	48.06%	304	16.38%	1,856
Passaic	1,618	40.51%	1,422	35.60%	954	23.89%	3,994
Salem	1,769	47.59%	432	11.62%	1,516	40.79%	3,717
Somerset	1,846	47.95%	1,295	33.64%	709	18.42%	3,850
Sussex	3,054	65.17%	1,601	34.17%	31	0.66%	4,686
Warren	2,877	58.49%	1,596	32.45%	446	9.07%	4,919
Total	46,943	47.23%	28,338	28.51%	24,115	24.26%	99,396

== See also ==
- United States presidential elections in New Jersey
