= 1884 United States presidential election in New Jersey =

- November 4, 1884

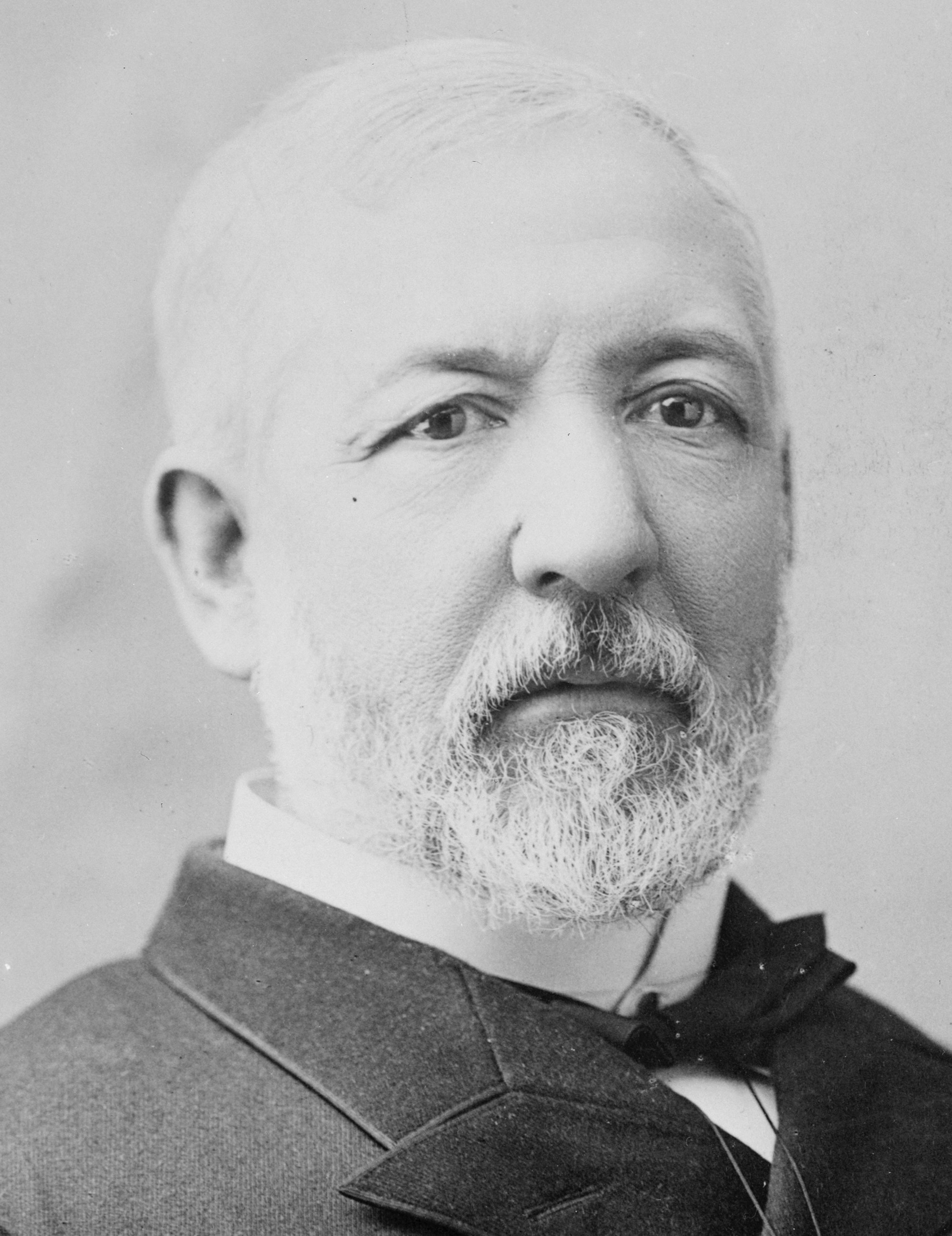
Nominee	Grover Cleveland	James G. Blaine
Party	Democratic	Republican
Home state	New York	Maine
Running mate	Thomas A. Hendricks	John A. Logan
Electoral vote	9	0
Popular vote	127,798	123,440
Percentage	48.98%	47.31%
County results
Cleveland
50–60%
Blaine
40–50%
50–60%
President before election
Chester A. Arthur
Republican
Elected President
Grover Cleveland
Democratic

The 1884 United States presidential election in New Jersey took place on November 4, 1884, as part of the 1884 United States presidential election. Voters chose nine representatives, or electors to the Electoral College, who voted for president and vice president.

New Jersey voted for the Democratic nominee, Grover Cleveland, over the Republican nominee, James G. Blaine. Cleveland won the state by a very narrow margin of 1.67 percentage points.

Grover Cleveland was born in New Jersey, specifically in the borough of Caldwell in 1837.

== Results ==
1884 United States presidential election in New Jersey
Party	Candidate	Running mate	Popular vote		Electoral vote	
Party	Candidate	Running mate	Count	%	Count	%
Democratic	Grover Cleveland of New York	Thomas Andrews Hendricks of Indiana	127,798	48.98%	9	100.00%
Republican	James Gillespie Blaine of Maine	John Alexander Logan of Illinois	123,440	47.31%	0	0.00%
Prohibition	John Pierce St. John of Kansas	William Daniel of Maryland	6,159	2.36%	0	0.00%
Greenback	Benjamin Franklin Butler of Massachusetts	Absolom Madden West of Mississippi	3,496	1.34%	0	0.00%
N/A	Others	Others	28	0.01%	0	0.00%
Total			260,921	100.00%	9	100.00%

=== Results by county ===
County	Stephen Grover Cleveland Democratic		James Gillespie Blaine Republican		Various candidates Other parties		Margin		Total votes cast
County	#	%	#	%	#	%	#	%	Total votes cast
Atlantic	1,854	40.36%	2,439	53.09%	301	6.55%	-585	-12.73%	4,594
Bergen	4,327	53.08%	3,688	45.24%	137	1.68%	639	7.84%	8,152
Burlington	6,384	46.64%	6,762	49.40%	542	3.96%	-378	-2.76%	13,688
Camden	6,545	42.01%	8,538	54.80%	498	3.20%	-1,993	-12.79%	15,581
Cape May	1,004	41.85%	1,235	51.48%	160	6.67%	-231	-9.63%	2,399
Cumberland	3,470	39.41%	4,491	51.01%	844	9.59%	-1,021	-11.60%	8,805
Essex	20,117	46.98%	21,332	49.82%	1369	3.20%	-1,215	-2.84%	42,818
Gloucester	2,792	42.21%	3,418	51.67%	405	6.12%	-626	-9.46%	6,615
Hudson	21,637	55.72%	16,312	42.01%	881	2.27%	5,325	13.71%	38,830
Hunterdon	5,345	57.48%	3,338	35.90%	616	6.62%	2,007	21.58%	9,299
Mercer	7,083	46.88%	7,696	50.94%	330	2.18%	-613	-4.06%	15,109
Middlesex	6,149	51.48%	5,562	46.57%	233	1.95%	587	4.91%	11,944
Monmouth	7,552	52.07%	6,446	44.45%	505	3.48%	1,106	7.63%	14,503
Morris	4,821	45.03%	5,198	48.55%	688	6.43%	-377	-3.52%	10,707
Ocean	1,595	42.26%	2,091	55.41%	88	2.33%	-496	-13.14%	3,774
Passaic	6,257	42.33%	8,130	55.01%	393	2.66%	-1,873	-12.67%	14,780
Salem	2,864	46.45%	3,022	49.01%	280	4.54%	-158	-2.56%	6,166
Somerset	3,116	50.35%	2,927	47.29%	146	2.36%	189	3.05%	6,189
Sussex	3,458	59.10%	2,218	37.91%	175	2.99%	1,240	21.19%	5,851
Union	6,215	50.86%	5,479	44.84%	526	4.30%	736	6.02%	12,220
Warren	5,193	59.20%	3,044	34.70%	535	6.10%	2,149	24.50%	8,772
Totals	127,778	49.00%	123,366	47.30%	9,652	3.70%	4,412	1.69%	260,796

== See also ==
- United States presidential elections in New Jersey
