= 1892 United States presidential election in New Jersey =

- November 8, 1892

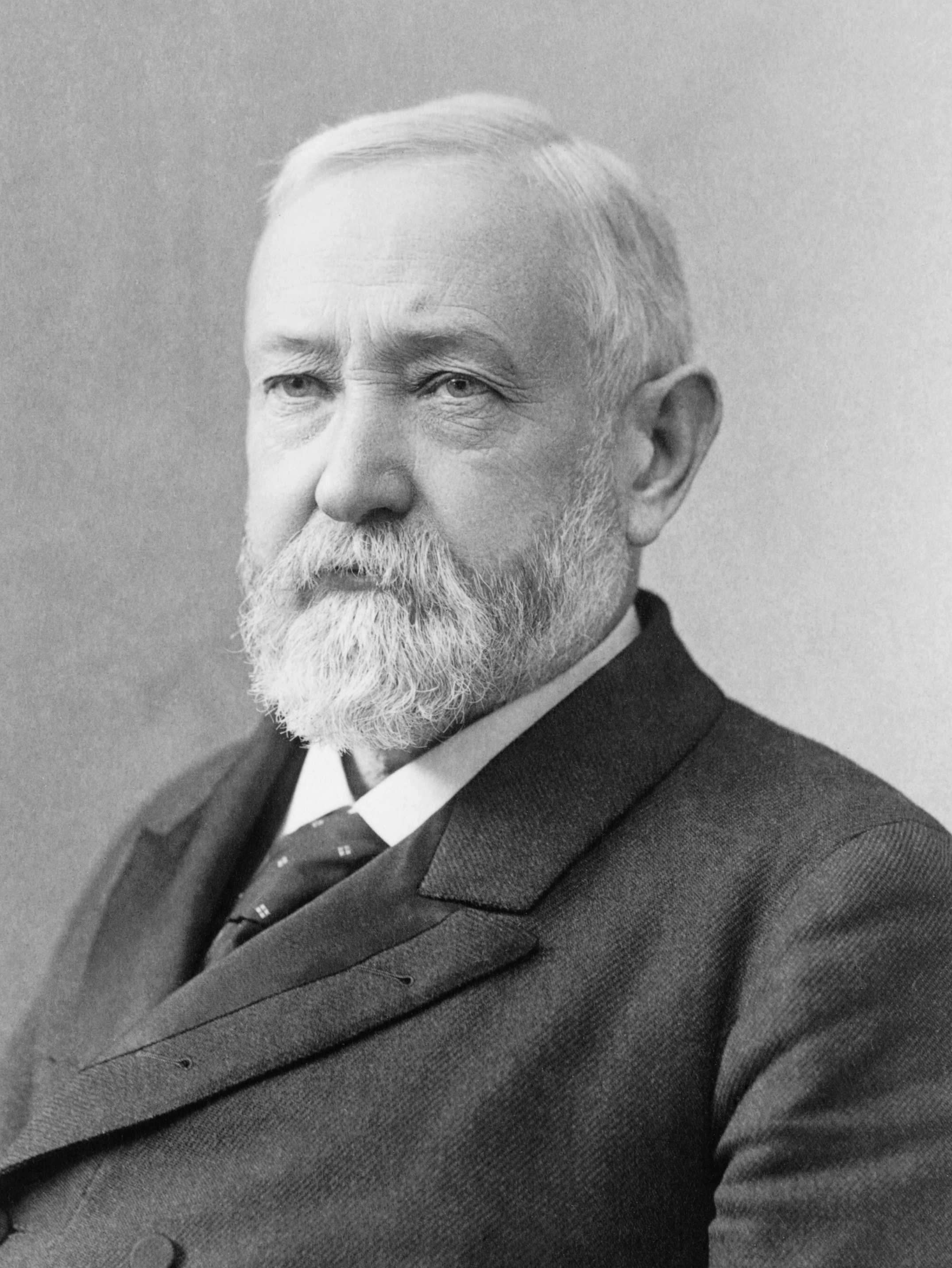
Nominee	Grover Cleveland	Benjamin Harrison
Party	Democratic	Republican
Home state	New York	Indiana
Running mate	Adlai Stevenson I	Whitelaw Reid
Electoral vote	10	0
Popular vote	171,066	156,101
Percentage	50.67%	46.24%
County results
Cleveland
40–50%
50–60%
Harrison
40–50%
50–60%
President before election
Benjamin Harrison
Republican
Elected President
Grover Cleveland
Democratic

The 1892 United States presidential election in New Jersey took place on November 8, 1892, as part of the 1892 United States presidential election. Voters chose 10 representatives, or electors to the Electoral College, who voted for president and vice president.

New Jersey voted for the Democratic nominee, former President Grover Cleveland, who was running for a second, non-consecutive term, over Republican nominee, incumbent President Benjamin Harrison. Cleveland won his birth state by a narrow margin of 4.43 points. This would be the last occasion the Democrats won Essex County until Franklin D. Roosevelt in 1936.

== Results ==
1892 United States presidential election in New Jersey
Party	Candidate	Running mate	Popular vote		Electoral vote	
Party	Candidate	Running mate	Count	%	Count	%
Democratic	Grover Cleveland of New York	Adlai Ewing Stevenson I of Illinois	171,066	50.67%	10	100.00%
Republican	Benjamin Harrison of Indiana (incumbent)	Whitelaw Reid of New York	156,101	46.24%	0	0.00%
Prohibition	John Bidwell of California	James Britton Cranfill of Texas	8,134	2.41%	0	0.00%
Socialist Labor	Simon Wing of Massachusetts	Charles Horatio Matchett of New York	1,337	0.40%	0	0.00%
Populist	James Baird Weaver of Iowa	James Gaven Field of Virginia	985	0.29%	0	0.00%
Total			337,623	100.00%	10	100.00%

=== Results by county ===
County	Stephen Grover Cleveland Democratic		Benjamin Harrison Republican		John Bidwell Prohibition		Various candidates Other parties		Margin		Total votes cast
County	#	%	#	%	#	%	#	%	#	%	Total votes cast
Atlantic	3,003	45.28%	3,329	50.20%	247	3.72%	53	0.80%	-326	-4.92%	6,632
Bergen	5,865	53.06%	5,019	45.41%	125	1.13%	44	0.40%	846	7.65%	11,053
Burlington	6,728	47.50%	6,882	48.59%	507	3.58%	47	0.33%	-154	-1.09%	14,164
Camden	10,005	46.36%	11,004	50.98%	498	2.31%	76	0.35%	-999	-4.63%	21,583
Cape May	1,310	43.84%	1,480	49.53%	191	6.39%	7	0.23%	-170	-5.69%	2,988
Cumberland	4,732	42.77%	5,517	49.87%	718	6.49%	96	0.87%	-785	-7.10%	11,063
Essex	30,176	50.02%	29,044	48.15%	781	1.29%	323	0.54%	1,132	1.88%	60,324
Gloucester	3,529	46.93%	3,748	49.85%	224	2.98%	18	0.24%	-219	-2.91%	7,519
Hudson	32,237	57.15%	23,307	41.32%	272	0.48%	594	1.05%	8,930	15.83%	56,410
Hunterdon	5,120	55.10%	3,449	37.12%	623	6.70%	100	1.08%	1,671	17.98%	9,292
Mercer	9,348	47.52%	9,795	49.79%	435	2.21%	93	0.47%	-447	-2.27%	19,671
Middlesex	7,945	55.02%	6,142	42.54%	248	1.72%	104	0.72%	1,803	12.49%	14,439
Monmouth	9,013	52.17%	7,676	44.43%	555	3.21%	33	0.19%	1,337	7.74%	17,277
Morris	5,837	47.18%	5,725	46.27%	674	5.45%	136	1.10%	112	0.91%	12,372
Ocean	1,561	35.84%	2,610	59.92%	168	3.86%	17	0.39%	-1,049	-24.08%	4,356
Passaic	10,992	47.49%	11,527	49.80%	406	1.75%	222	0.96%	-535	-2.31%	23,147
Salem	3,237	48.31%	3,152	47.04%	290	4.33%	21	0.31%	85	1.27%	6,700
Somerset	3,408	48.86%	3,342	47.91%	220	3.15%	5	0.07%	66	0.95%	6,975
Sussex	3,218	55.59%	2,347	40.54%	195	3.37%	29	0.50%	871	15.05%	5,789
Union	8,600	50.79%	7,825	46.21%	302	1.78%	207	1.22%	775	4.58%	16,934
Warren	5,202	58.22%	3,182	35.61%	454	5.08%	97	1.09%	2,020	22.61%	8,935
Totals	171,066	50.67%	156,102	46.24%	8,133	2.41%	2,322	0.69%	14,964	4.43%	337,623

== See also ==
- United States presidential elections in New Jersey
