= Politics of New Jersey =

United States presidential election results for New Jersey
Year	Republican / Whig		Democratic		Third party(ies)	
Year	No.	%	No.	%	No.	%
1824	8,309	41.89%	10,332	52.08%	1,196	6.03%
1828	23,753	52.12%	21,809	47.86%	8	0.02%
1832	23,466	49.13%	23,826	49.89%	468	0.98%
1836	26,137	50.53%	25,592	49.47%	0	0.00%
1840	33,351	51.74%	31,034	48.15%	69	0.11%
1844	38,318	50.46%	37,495	49.37%	131	0.17%
1848	40,015	51.48%	36,901	47.47%	819	1.05%
1852	38,556	46.33%	44,305	53.24%	359	0.43%
1856	28,338	28.51%	46,943	47.23%	24,115	24.26%
1860	58,346	48.13%	62,869	51.87%	0	0.00%
1864	60,723	47.16%	68,024	52.84%	0	0.00%
1868	80,131	49.12%	83,001	50.88%	0	0.00%
1872	91,656	54.52%	76,456	45.48%	0	0.00%
1876	103,517	47.01%	115,962	52.66%	714	0.32%
1880	120,555	49.02%	122,565	49.84%	2,808	1.14%
1884	123,440	47.31%	127,798	48.98%	9,683	3.71%
1888	144,360	47.52%	151,508	49.87%	7,933	2.61%
1892	156,101	46.24%	171,066	50.67%	10,456	3.10%
1896	221,535	59.68%	133,695	36.02%	15,981	4.31%
1900	221,754	55.27%	164,879	41.10%	14,573	3.63%
1904	245,164	56.68%	164,566	38.05%	22,817	5.28%
1908	265,326	56.79%	182,567	39.08%	19,305	4.13%
1912	88,835	20.53%	178,289	41.20%	165,615	38.27%
1916	268,982	54.40%	211,018	42.68%	14,442	2.92%
1920	611,541	67.65%	256,887	28.42%	35,515	3.93%
1924	675,162	62.17%	297,743	27.41%	113,174	10.42%
1928	926,050	59.77%	616,517	39.79%	6,814	0.44%
1932	775,684	47.59%	806,630	49.48%	47,749	2.93%
1936	720,322	39.57%	1,083,850	59.54%	16,265	0.89%
1940	945,475	47.93%	1,016,808	51.55%	10,269	0.52%
1944	961,335	48.95%	987,874	50.31%	14,552	0.74%
1948	981,124	50.33%	895,455	45.93%	72,976	3.74%
1952	1,374,613	56.81%	1,015,902	41.99%	29,039	1.20%
1956	1,606,942	64.68%	850,337	34.23%	27,033	1.09%
1960	1,363,324	49.16%	1,385,415	49.96%	24,372	0.88%
1964	963,843	33.86%	1,867,671	65.61%	15,256	0.54%
1968	1,325,467	46.10%	1,264,206	43.97%	285,722	9.94%
1972	1,845,502	61.57%	1,102,211	36.77%	49,516	1.65%
1976	1,509,688	50.08%	1,444,653	47.92%	60,131	1.99%
1980	1,546,557	51.97%	1,147,364	38.56%	281,763	9.47%
1984	1,933,630	60.09%	1,261,323	39.20%	22,909	0.71%
1988	1,743,192	56.24%	1,320,352	42.60%	36,009	1.16%
1992	1,356,865	40.58%	1,436,206	42.95%	550,523	16.47%
1996	1,103,078	35.86%	1,652,329	53.72%	320,400	10.42%
2000	1,284,173	40.29%	1,788,850	56.13%	114,203	3.58%
2004	1,670,003	46.23%	1,911,430	52.92%	30,704	0.85%
2008	1,613,207	41.61%	2,215,422	57.14%	48,778	1.26%
2012	1,478,749	40.50%	2,126,610	58.25%	45,781	1.25%
2016	1,601,933	41.00%	2,148,278	54.99%	156,512	4.01%
2020	1,883,313	41.40%	2,608,400	57.33%	57,744	1.27%
2024	1,968,215	46.06%	2,220,713	51.97%	83,797	1.96%

New Jersey is one of the most Democratic U.S. states. The state is considered a stronghold of the Democratic Party and has supported the Democratic candidate in every presidential election since 1992. Democrats have also controlled both chambers of the state legislature since 2004. New Jersey currently has two Democratic United States senators. New Jersey's Class I Senate seat has been Democratic since 1959 (aside from the eight-month tenure of Nicholas F. Brady in 1982). New Jersey's Class II Senate seat has been Democratic since 1979 (aside from the four-month tenure of Jeffrey Chiesa in 2013). In addition, New Jersey's House congressional delegation has had a Democratic majority since 1965, except for a period between 1995–1999 and 2013–2017. As of July 1, 2020, there were more registered Democrats than unaffiliated voters for the first time in history, as there are more Democrats than Republicans as well.

== History ==
=== American Revolution ===
In 1776, the first constitution of New Jersey was drafted. Written during the American Revolution, it created a basic framework for state government and allowed "all inhabitants of this Colony, of full age, who are worth fifty pounds proclamation money" to vote (including blacks, spinsters, and widows); married women could not own property under common law. The constitution declared itself temporary and void if there was reconciliation with Great Britain. Both parties in elections mocked the other party for relying on "petticoat electors", and accused each other of allowing unqualified women to vote. The state voted for Washington in 1789 and 1792, as well as Adams in 1796.

=== Nineteenth century ===
The second version of the constitution was adopted on June 29, 1844, and restricted suffrage to white males. Important components of the second state constitution included the separation of powers among the executive, legislative, and judicial branches. The new constitution also provided a bill of rights, and granted voters (instead of the legislature) the right to elect the governor. It also allowed gubernatorial veto power and appointment of high-level officials.

Throughout the century, the state voted for the Federalist Party twice, the Democratic-Republican Party five times, the National Republican Party once, the Whig Party four times, the Democratic Party ten times, and the Republican Party three times.

=== Twentieth century ===
The 20th century saw the nonwhite population grow rapidly, altering the political landscape. Between 1915 and 1920, the first Great Migration of African Americans from the South brought in thousands of migrants into New Jersey cities, with Newark and Camden both having their black populations double in that time. During the 1920s, the black population grew by 78%, with Newark again doubling its black population. African Americans became a solidly Democratic voting bloc starting in the 1930s under FDR. During the 1980s, a significant number of Asian Americans immigrated to the northeastern and central parts of the state and tended to vote Democratic. Since the 1980s, the Latin American population in New Jersey, who also tended to vote Democratic, has grown significantly, particularly in the northeastern and central parts of the state, as well as Camden and Cumberland County. another group that tended to vote Democratic. In contrast, voters in suburban New Jersey were overwhelmingly white, and more likely to vote Republican.

The 1844 constitution had a confusing and unwieldy court system, as well as an extremely powerful legislature with a weak governor. In 1947, a new Constitution was established, which largely reorganized the judicial system into a hierarchical structure. Gubernatorial terms were extended from three to four years, the governor's term limit extended from one to two terns, and all executive agencies were placed directly under gubernatorial control.

From 1894 to 1973, Republicans usually controlled both houses of the state legislature (with the exceptions of 1907, 1911, 1913–1914, 1932, 1937, 1958–1963, 1966–1967). From 1900 to 1944, New Jersey voted for Democrats five times, and voted for Republicans seven times. After World War II, New Jersey was a Republican-leaning swing state in presidential elections; from the 1948 to the 1988, Republican candidates won nine out of eleven elections. John F. Kennedy won New Jersey in 1960 by 22,000 votes, and Lyndon B. Johnson won in 1964 as a part of his landslide victory, garnering the second-highest percent of the popular vote in history after 1920. The governor of the state swung between both parties every one to four election cycles throughout the entire century.

The two seats for the United States Senate were swing seats in the first half of the century, although they leaned Republican. At least one seat has been in Democratic control since 1959, and both seats have been held by Democrats since 1978, with the exception of April 1982-December 1982, when Nicholas F. Brady was appointed to the Senate by Governor Thomas Kean after the resignation of Harrison A. Williams. Republicans dominated the majority of seats to the United States House of Representatives from 1895 to 1965, with the exception of 1911–1914, 1923–1924, and 1937–1938. Democrats have controlled a majority of seats since 1965, with the exception of 1995–1998.

Since 1992, New Jersey has voted for Democrats in every presidential election. Bill Clinton won a plurality of New Jersey's popular vote that year, and a majority of New Jersey's popular vote in 1996. Among Republican New Jersey voters, those living in rural parts of the state tended to vote for conservative Republicans; suburban voters tended to prefer liberal, or moderate, Republicans.

=== Twenty-first century ===
Since 2002, the New Jersey Legislature has been overwhelmingly Democratic. Democrats won a majority in the New Jersey General Assembly in the 2001 election and a majority in the New Jersey Senate in the 2001 election. As of October 2024, there were over 917,000 more registered Democrats than Republicans. Democrats tend to do well in areas near New York City, Philadelphia, and Trenton, and cities such as Jersey City, Newark, Camden, Elizabeth, Trenton, and Paterson are overwhelmingly Democratic. These cities influence their respective counties (namely Hudson, Essex, Camden, Union, Mercer, and Passaic) to vote Democratic. Predominantly suburban and rural counties, especially those along the Jersey Shore and in northwestern New Jersey, tend to vote Republican; these include counties such as Ocean, Warren, Cape May, and Sussex. Other counties, such as Atlantic, Morris, and Cumberland, are considered "swing" counties; they tend to vote closely within the margins of each party, swaying in one direction or the other with each election.

== Statistics ==
The 2016 presidential election in New Jersey was won by Democrat Hillary Clinton in 12 counties, while Republican Donald Trump won nine counties; overall, Clinton carried the state with a vote percentage of 55.45 to 41.35 percent. Trump won two counties (Gloucester and Salem) which had voted Democratic in 2012. Every county voted identically in 2016 and the 2017 gubernatorial election with the exception of Gloucester, which flipped back to Democratic. In the 2018 United States Senate election, Atlantic and Gloucester Counties flipped Republican. In the 2020 presidential election, Biden flipped Atlantic, Gloucester, and Morris counties from the 2018 elections. In the 2024 presidential election, Trump flipped back Gloucester and Morris counties, both of which he won in 2016, from the 2020 elections. He also flipped Atlantic, Cumberland, and Passaic counties, all of which voted Democratic in the 2016 and 2020 presidential elections. Atlantic and Cumberland counties had previously been won by Republican candidate Jack Ciattarelli in the 2021 gubernatorial election. All counties voted identically in the simultaneous 2024 United States Senate election as they did the presidential election, with the exception of Gloucester and Passaic, which were both won by Democratic candidate Andy Kim by slim margins. Mikie Sherrill flipped Atlantic, Cumberland, and Morris counties to Democratic in the 2025 gubernatorial election.

County votes for 2016 Presidential, 2017 Gubernatorial, 2018 Senate, 2020 Presidential, 2020 Senate, 2021 Gubernatorial, 2024 Presidential, 2024 Senate 2025 Gubernatorial
County	2016 Presidential	2017 Gubernatorial	2018 Senate	2020 Presidential	2020 Senate	2021 Gubernatorial	2024 Presidential	2024 Senate	2025 Gubernatorial
Atlantic	Clinton	Murphy	Hugin	Biden	Booker	Ciattarelli	Trump	Bashaw	Sherrill
Bergen	Clinton	Murphy	Menendez	Biden	Booker	Murphy	Harris	Kim	Sherrill
Burlington	Clinton	Murphy	Menendez	Biden	Booker	Murphy	Harris	Kim	Sherrill
Camden	Clinton	Murphy	Menendez	Biden	Booker	Murphy	Harris	Kim	Sherrill
Cape May	Trump	Guadagno	Hugin	Trump	Mehta	Ciattarelli	Trump	Bashaw	Ciattarelli
Cumberland	Clinton	Murphy	Menendez	Biden	Booker	Ciattarelli	Trump	Bashaw	Sherrill
Essex	Clinton	Murphy	Menendez	Biden	Booker	Murphy	Harris	Kim	Sherrill
Gloucester	Trump	Murphy	Hugin	Biden	Booker	Ciattarelli	Trump	Kim	Sherrill
Hudson	Clinton	Murphy	Menendez	Biden	Booker	Murphy	Harris	Kim	Sherrill
Hunterdon	Trump	Guadagno	Hugin	Trump	Mehta	Ciattarelli	Trump	Bashaw	Ciattarelli
Mercer	Clinton	Murphy	Menendez	Biden	Booker	Murphy	Harris	Kim	Sherrill
Middlesex	Clinton	Murphy	Menendez	Biden	Booker	Murphy	Harris	Kim	Sherrill
Monmouth	Trump	Guadagno	Hugin	Trump	Mehta	Ciattarelli	Trump	Bashaw	Ciattarelli
Morris	Trump	Guadagno	Hugin	Biden	Booker	Ciattarelli	Trump	Bashaw	Sherrill
Ocean	Trump	Guadagno	Hugin	Trump	Mehta	Ciattarelli	Trump	Bashaw	Ciattarelli
Passaic	Clinton	Murphy	Menendez	Biden	Booker	Murphy	Trump	Kim	Sherrill
Salem	Trump	Guadagno	Hugin	Trump	Mehta	Ciattarelli	Trump	Bashaw	Ciattarelli
Somerset	Clinton	Murphy	Menendez	Biden	Booker	Murphy	Harris	Kim	Sherrill
Sussex	Trump	Guadagno	Hugin	Trump	Mehta	Ciattarelli	Trump	Bashaw	Ciattarelli
Union	Clinton	Murphy	Menendez	Biden	Booker	Murphy	Harris	Kim	Sherrill
Warren	Trump	Guadagno	Hugin	Trump	Mehta	Ciattarelli	Trump	Bashaw	Ciattarelli

=== Recent registration statistics ===
Nine counties (Burlington, Camden, Essex, Gloucester, Hudson, Mercer, Middlesex, Passaic, and Union) have a plurality of Democratic registrants, and five (Cape May, Hunterdon, Ocean, Sussex, and Warren) have a plurality of Republican registrants; the remaining seven have a majority of unaffiliated voters. Of those with an unaffiliated majority, four counties have more Democrats than Republicans (Atlantic, Bergen, Cumberland and Somerset) and three counties (Monmouth, Morris, and Salem) have more Republicans than Democrats.

Two counties (Essex and Hudson) have an absolute majority of their registrants in one party (Democratic). The highest percentage of unaffiliated voters is in Cumberland at 40.13 percent. The highest percentage of Democrats is in Hudson at 51.63 percent, the highest percentage of Republicans is in Cape May at 44.31 percent, and the highest percentage registered in other parties is in Cumberland at 1.80 percent. The lowest percentage of unaffiliated is in Hunterdon at 30.56 percent, Democrats is in Ocean at 20.25 percent, Republicans is in Essex at 11.00 percent, and other parties in Hunterdon at 0.85 percent. Bergen County has the largest number of registered voters at 696,442, and Salem County has the least at 50,579.

Voter registration by county on January 1, 2025
County (Note: Counties are colored based on majority party registration.)	Unaffiliated	Una %	Democratic	Dem %	Republican	Rep %	Other (Note: Consists of the Conservative Party, Green Party, Libertarian Party, Natural Law Party, Reform Party, Socialist Party and the U.S. Constitution Party.)	O %	Total
Atlantic	75,079	36.11%	69,492	33.42%	60,556	29.12%	2,794	1.34%	207,921
Bergen	270,730	38.87%	256,970	36.90%	162,148	23.28%	6,594	0.95%	696,442
Burlington	128,081	34.25%	143,503	38.38%	98,118	26.24%	4,235	1.13%	373,937
Camden	140,932	35.20%	183,759	45.89%	70,368	17.57%	5,365	1.34%	400,424
Cape May	23,254	30.67%	18,110	23.88%	33,597	44.31%	862	1.14%	75,823
Cumberland	39,802	40.40%	31,921	32.40%	25,019	25.40%	1,770	1.80%	98,512
Essex	223,826	37.34%	304,139	50.74%	65,929	11.00%	5,547	0.93%	599,441
Gloucester	76,534	33.63%	83,808	36.82%	64,385	28.29%	2,874	1.26%	227,606
Hudson	150,624	34.98%	222,272	51.63%	51,927	12.06%	5,717	1.33%	430,540
Hunterdon	33,631	30.56%	31,274	28.42%	44,214	40.18%	934	0.85%	110,053
Mercer	105,270	38.59%	120,603	44.21%	43,286	15.87%	3,618	1.33%	272,777
Middlesex	236,002	39.78%	242,795	40.93%	107,322	18.09%	7,088	1.19%	593,207
Monmouth	201,508	39.32%	141,305	27.58%	164,050	32.01%	5,558	1.08%	512,421
Morris	140,274	34.76%	119,561	29.63%	139,843	34.65%	3,867	0.96%	403,545
Ocean	188,214	38.56%	98,824	20.25%	195,272	40.00%	5,764	1.18%	488,074
Passaic	128,754	37.54%	132,031	38.49%	77,540	22.61%	4,668	1.36%	342,993
Salem	18,972	37.51%	14,712	29.09%	16,086	31.80%	809	1.60%	50,579
Somerset	103,105	38.95%	92,555	34.96%	66,443	25.09%	2,637	1.00%	264,740
Sussex	41,638	34.08%	26,916	22.03%	51,821	42.42%	1,787	1.46%	122,162
Union	143,768	36.52%	179,359	45.56%	66,190	16.81%	4,340	1.10%	393,657
Warren	27,938	30.73%	24,022	26.42%	37,467	41.21%	1,486	1.63%	90,913
Total	2,497,936	36.97%	2,537,931	37.57%	1,641,581	24.30%	78,319	1.16%	6,755,767

Seven districts- the 1st, 6th, 8th, 9th, 10th, 11th and 12th- have a majority of Democratic registrants, and zero have a majority of Republican registrants; the remaining five have a majority of unaffiliated voters. Of those with an unaffiliated majority, three districts have more Republicans than Democrats- 2nd, 4th, and 7th- and two districts- the 3rd and 5th, have more Democrats than Republicans.

Districts 8 and 10 have an absolute majority of their registrants in one party (Democratic). The highest percentage of unaffiliated voters is in District 6 at 39.01 percent. The highest percentage of Democrats is in District 10 at 54.06 percent; the highest percentage of Republicans is in District 4 at 38.17 percent, and the highest percentage registered in other parties is District 2 at 1.42 percent. The lowest percentage of unaffiliated is in District 1 at 34.45 percent, Democrats is in District 4 at 22.10 percent, Republicans is in District 10 at 8.74 percent, and other parties is in District 11 at 0.84 percent. The district with the largest Democratic-Republican percentage spread is District 10 at 45.32 percent. The district with the smallest Democratic-Republican percentage spread is District 7 at 3.01 percent. District 7 has the largest number of registered voters at 634,344 and District 8 has the least at 417,988.

Voter registration by congressional district on October 1, 2024
District (Note: Districts are colored by majority party registration.)	Unaffiliated	Una %	Democratic	Dem %	Republican	Rep %	Other (Note: Consists of the Conservative Party, Green Party, Libertarian Party, Natural Law Party, Reform Party, Socialist Party and the U.S. Constitution Party.)	O %	Total
1	198,034	34.45%	253,888	44.516	115,204	20.04%	7,770	1.35%	574,896
2	212,071	36.03%	175,220	29.77%	193,003	32.79%	8,344	1.42%	588,638
3	223,113	36.36%	219,977	35.85%	163,515	26.65%	6,954	1.13%	613,559
4	226,113	38.60%	129,435	22.10%	223,571	38.17%	5,423	0.93%	585,712
5	219,867	37.20%	207,771	35.16%	157,594	26.67%	5,755	0.97%	590,987
6	201,750	39.01%	208,252	40.27%	100,368	19.40%	6,740	1.350%	517,110
7	219,440	34.59%	194,585	30.67%	213,637	33.68%	6,682	1.05%	634,344
8	147,191	35.21%	216,367	51.76%	48,922	11.70%	5,508	1.31%	417,988
9	184,762	38.70%	191,952	40.20%	94,232	19.73%	6,488	1.36%	477,434
10	183,577	36.02%	275,486	54.06%	44,519	8.74%	6,056	1.19%	509,638
11	216,490	35.44%	226,280	37.04%	162,984	26.68%	5,113	0.84%	610,867
12	208,519	38.70%	229,704	42.63%	94,139	17.47%	6,428	1.19%	538,790
Total	2,440,927	36.65%	2,528,917	37.97%	1,611,688	24.20%	78,431	1.18%	6,659,963

=== 1992–present monthly registration statistics ===
Historic voter registration statistics on specific months
Month	Unaffiliated	Una %	Democratic	Dem %	Republican	Rep %	Other (Note: Consists of the Conservative Party, Green Party, Libertarian Party, Natural Law Party, Reform Party, Socialist Party and the U.S. Constitution Party.)	O %	Total
Nov. 1992	2,060,989	50.76%	1,175,141	28.94%	817,837	20.14%	6,470	0.16%	4,060,337
Nov. 1998	2,513,962	55.38%	1,141,593	25.15%	872,349	19.22%	11,040	0.24%	4,538,944
Nov. 2000	2,641,861	56.08%	1,179,577	25.04%	876,386	18.60%	12,944	0.27%	4,710,768
Nov. 2005	2,760,558	57.12%	1,157,177	23.94%	893,854	18.49%	21,236	0.44%	4,832,825
Nov. 2010	2,441,291	46.29%	1,755,501	33.28%	1,074,364	20.37%	2,937	0.06%	5,274,093
Nov. 2015	2,605,919	48.11%	1,747,551	32.26%	1,058,277	19.54%	4,816	0.09%	5,416,563
Nov. 2016	2,518,824	43.23%	2,076,528	35.64%	1,213,075	20.82%	17,690	0.30%	5,826,116
Nov. 2017	2,362,630	41.02%	2,122,472	36.85%	1,241,674	21.56%	32,519	0.56%	5,759,295
Nov. 2018	2,394,968	40.30%	2,216,958	37.30%	1,285,034	21.62%	45,720	0.77%	5,942,680
Nov. 2019	2,386,164	39.06%	2,315,853	37.91%	1,334,550	21.84%	72,682	1.19%	6,109,249
Nov. 2020	2,440,416	37.54%	2,529,575	38.91%	1,450,137	22.31%	79,707	1.22%	6,499,835
Nov. 2021	2,416,345	36.70%	2,577,146	39.14%	1,508,212	22.91%	81,835	1.24%	6,583,538
Nov. 2022	2,372,156	36.42%	2,532,844	38.88%	1,528,001	23.45%	81,060	1.24%	6,514,061
Nov. 2023	2,367,992	36.47%	2,504,294	38.57%	1,541,158	23.74%	79,090	1.22%	6,492,534
Nov. 2024	2,485,411	36.94%	2,534,932	37.68%	1,628,633	24.21%	78,382	1.16%	6,727,358
Jun. 2025	2,418,977	36.84%	2,449,526	37.31%	1,621,669	24.70%	75.113	1.14%	6,565,285
Jul. 2025	2,306,930	35.06%	2,534,153	38.51%	1,665,276	25.30%	74.257	1.13%	6,580,616
Aug. 2025	2,319,186	35.18%	2,531,752	38.41%	1,666,927	25.29%	73.725	1.12%	6,591,590
Sep. 2025	2,327,307	35.27%	2,529,708	38.33%	1,667,912	25.28%	73.659	1.12%	6,598,586
Oct. 2025	2,340,583	35.41%	2,525,346	38.21%	1,670,297	25.27%	73.669	1.11%	6,609,895

== Federal representation ==
Following each decennial census, the New Jersey Redistricting Commission forms to redraw the districts. New Jersey currently has 12 House districts. In the 119th Congress, nine of New Jersey's seats are held by Democrats and three are held by Republicans:

- New Jersey's 1st congressional district represented by Donald Norcross (D)
- New Jersey's 2nd congressional district represented by Jeff Van Drew (R)
- New Jersey's 3rd congressional district represented by Herb Conaway (D)
- New Jersey's 4th congressional district represented by Chris Smith (R)
- New Jersey's 5th congressional district represented by Josh Gottheimer (D)
- New Jersey's 6th congressional district represented by Frank Pallone (D)
- New Jersey's 7th congressional district represented by Tom Kean Jr. (R)
- New Jersey's 8th congressional district represented by Rob Menendez (D)
- New Jersey's 9th congressional district represented by Nellie Pou (D)
- New Jersey's 10th congressional district is represented by LaMonica McIver (D)
- New Jersey's 11th congressional district is vacant
- New Jersey's 12th congressional district represented by Bonnie Watson Coleman (D)

New Jersey's two United States senators are Democrats Cory Booker and Andy Kim, serving since 2013 and 2025, respectively.

New Jersey is part of the United States District Court for the District of New Jersey in the federal judiciary. The district's cases are appealed to the Philadelphia-based United States Court of Appeals for the Third Circuit.

== Issues ==
The most contentious recent issue in New Jersey has been the conflict between the state government and public-sector unions. The unions, allied with the Democratic Party, believed that their workers were entitled to pensions and healthcare which had been promised to them in the past. Moderate Democrats and Republicans believed that the state could no longer afford to pay for benefits it had promised public workers in the past.

Property taxes are also an issue, since the state has the nation's highest property tax. New Jersey is a densely populated, high-income, high-cost-of-living state, with more money needed for infrastructure and transportation, and it does not allow counties and municipalities to impose local income or sales taxes. Property taxes fund local government, schools and county expenses, making lowering it difficult.

Legalized gambling is also an issue. In 2011, Governor Chris Christie and Senate President Steve Sweeney promised to limit gambling to Atlantic City for "at least five years" to protect the struggling tourist destination from intrastate competition. Developers are pressuring the legislature to allow gambling in other parts of the state, such as the Meadowlands. New Jersey challenged the Professional and Amateur Sports Protection Act (PASPA) in 2014, which had grandfathered Nevada's federal statutory monopoly on legal sports betting. The Supreme Court overturned the appellate-court decision, removing the final barrier to New Jersey sports betting on May 14, 2018. Justice Samuel Alito wrote the opinion supporting New Jersey's assertion that the PASPA infringed on the state's Tenth Amendment rights in Murphy vs. Collegiate Athletic Association. The state quickly moved to capitalize on the ruling and allow sports betting at state-sanctioned sportsbooks at the Meadowlands Racetrack.

In 2010, New Jersey legalized medical cannabis. The law, legalizing the drug for medical use, was passed by a Democratic government just before Christie (who was skeptical about legalized medical marijuana) took office. Christie subsequently vetoed, or requested alterations to, laws expanding the state's program. The issue gained attention during the 2013 gubernatorial election, when the father of a young girl with epilepsy confronted Christie at a diner. In March 2019, a vote on recreational legalization was canceled at the last minute. The state senate did not have the 21 votes needed to pass, since all of its Republicans and nine of its Democrats opposed the bill. A ballot measure to legalize marijuana for recreational use was on the ballot on November 3, 2020. Named Public Question 1, it passed overwhelmingly 67%-33%, with every county supporting legalization.

On October 21, 2019, weeks after California passed a similar bill, state Senators Joseph Lagana (D-Bergen) and Sandra Cunningham (D-Hudson) introduced the New Jersey Fair Play Act. The bill would allow college athletes to be paid for the use of their names, images and likeness, and to hire an agent or lawyer. It intends to protect student athletes, since one injury can cost them their scholarship without a way to pay for school or vocational guidance.

On February 4, 2019, Governor Phil Murphy signed a $15-minimum-wage bill into law. The law will increase the minimum wage by $1 every January 1 until it reaches $15 in 2024. When it was enacted, the state's minimum wage was $8.85. The first increase was on July 1, 2019 (to $10) and it became $12 on January 1, 2021. The bill raises tipped-worker wages from $2.13 to $5.13 per hour; if a worker does not earn the minimum wage through tips, the employer must make up the difference. Farm-workers will only be raised to $12.50 an hour in 2024, then possibly raised to $15 by 2027.

=== LGBT rights ===
In April 2004, New Jersey enacted a domestic-partnership law which is available to same- and opposite-sex couples aged 62 and over. In 2006, the Supreme Court of New Jersey ordered the state to provide the rights and benefits of marriage to gay and lesbian couples. The following year, New Jersey became the third state in the U.S. (after Connecticut and Vermont) to offer civil unions to same-sex couples. In 2013, the state supreme court ruled that New Jersey must allow same-sex couples to marry. A 2010 last-minute attempt to legalize same-sex marriage under outgoing Democratic governor failed because of objections by Senate President Steve Sweeney (also a Democrat). From 2010 to 2013, Governor Christie vetoed attempts by the state legislature to legalize same-sex marriage. Since the 2013 New Jersey Supreme Court ruling, three government-recognized relationships have been in effect in the state: domestic partnerships, civil unions, and marriage. Same-sex marriage was legalized in New Jersey under Obergefell v. Hodges, and was officially codified into law in January 2022.

In 2013, New Jersey became the second state to ban conversion therapy for minors. In 2018, Governor Murphy signed bills that repealed the legal requirement for sex reassignment surgery on birth certificates, created a third gender category on official documents (labelled as "X"), and included transgender and intersex people on death certificates. In January 2020, Murphy signed a law that reduced barriers to same-sex couples in regards to adoption. In January 2020, the New Jersey Legislature unanimously passed during a bill banning the "gay panic defense". In 2021, a law known as the LGBT Senior Bill of Rights was passed, which banned LGBT discrimination in long-term care facilities. In 2022, Murphy signed an executive order legally protecting and defending gender-affirming healthcare within New Jersey borders.

=== Gun control ===
New Jersey has some of the country's strictest gun control laws in the nation.

=== Corruption ===
United States Senator Bob Menendnez was indicted in 2015 by the FBI for bribery, fraud, and making false statements. In 2023, Menendez was indicted again by the FBI for corruption, on the basis that he "provided sensitive U.S. Government information and took other steps that secretly aided the Government of Egypt". New Jersey Democratic Party politicians began calling for his resignation the following day. Bribes Menendez received included a Mercedes-Benz car, 13 gold bars, and $486,461 in cash. After a federal jury found Menendez guilty on all 16 counts in July 2024, including for bribery, extortion, and acting as a foreign agent, various United States Senators were calling for his resignation, and that they would expel him from the Senate if he failed to resign. Menendez officially resigned from the Senate on August 20, 2024.

== See also ==
- Government of New Jersey
- Political party strength in New Jersey
- Elections in New Jersey
- Law of New Jersey
