= 1864 United States presidential election in Connecticut =

- November 8, 1864

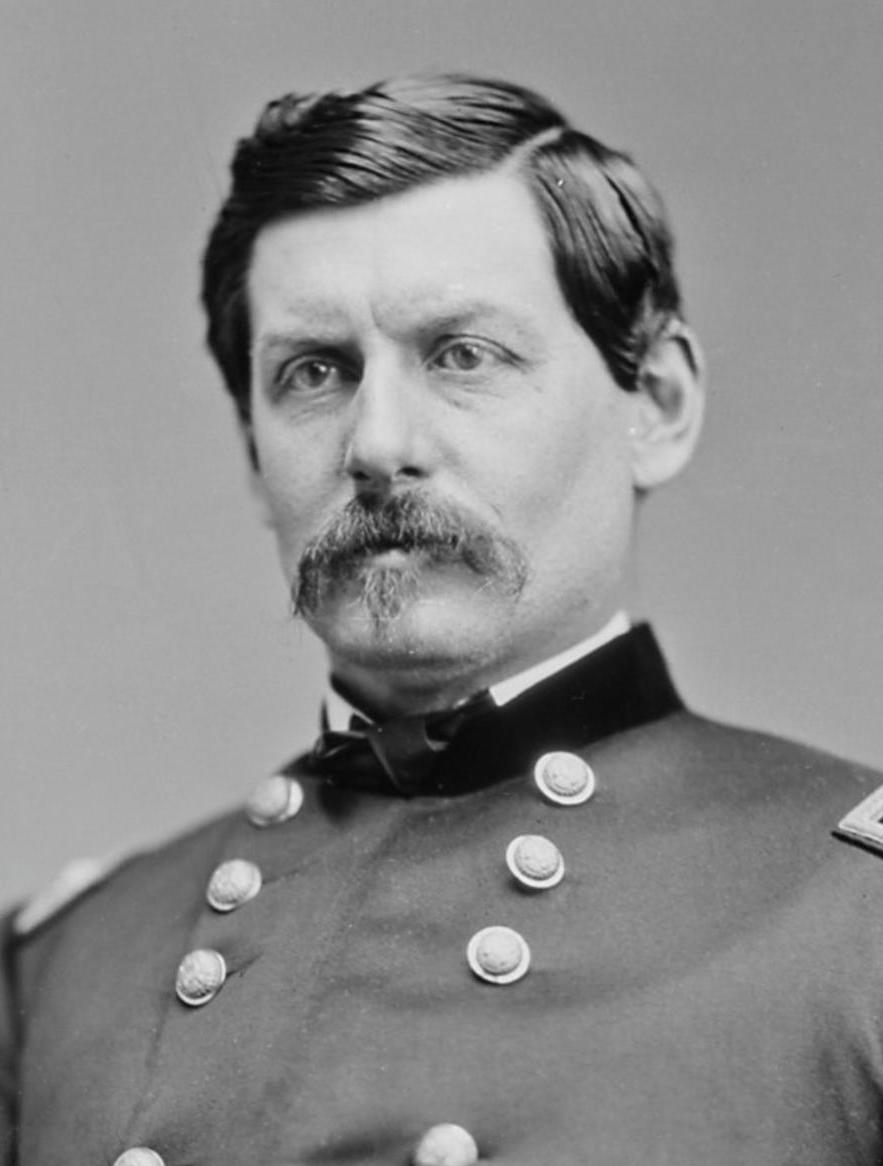
Nominee	Abraham Lincoln	George B. McClellan
Party	National Union	Democratic
Home state	Illinois	New Jersey
Running mate	Andrew Johnson	George H. Pendleton
Electoral vote	6	0
Popular vote	44,693	42,288
Percentage	51.38%	48.62%

Lincoln
50–60%
60–70%
70–80%
80–90%
McClellan
50–60%
60–70%
70–80%
President before election
Abraham Lincoln
Republican
Elected President
Abraham Lincoln
National Union

The 1864 United States presidential election in Connecticut took place on November 8, 1864, as part of the 1864 United States presidential election. Voters chose six representatives, or electors to the Electoral College, who voted for president and vice president.

Connecticut voted for the National Union candidate, Abraham Lincoln and his running mate Andrew Johnson. They defeated the Democratic candidate, George B. McClellan and his running mate George H. Pendleton. Lincoln won the state by a narrow margin of 2.76%.

Although he lost the state, Connecticut would prove to be McClellan's fifth strongest state after Kentucky, New Jersey, Delaware and New York.

== Results ==
1864 United States presidential election in Connecticut
Party	Candidate	Votes	Percentage	Electoral votes
National Union	Abraham Lincoln (incumbent)	44,693	51.38%	6
Democratic	George B. McClellan	42,288	48.62%	0
Totals		86,981	100.0%	6

== See also ==
- United States presidential elections in Connecticut
