= 1864 United States presidential election in New York =

- November 8, 1864
- Turnout: 89.3% ▼6.2 pp

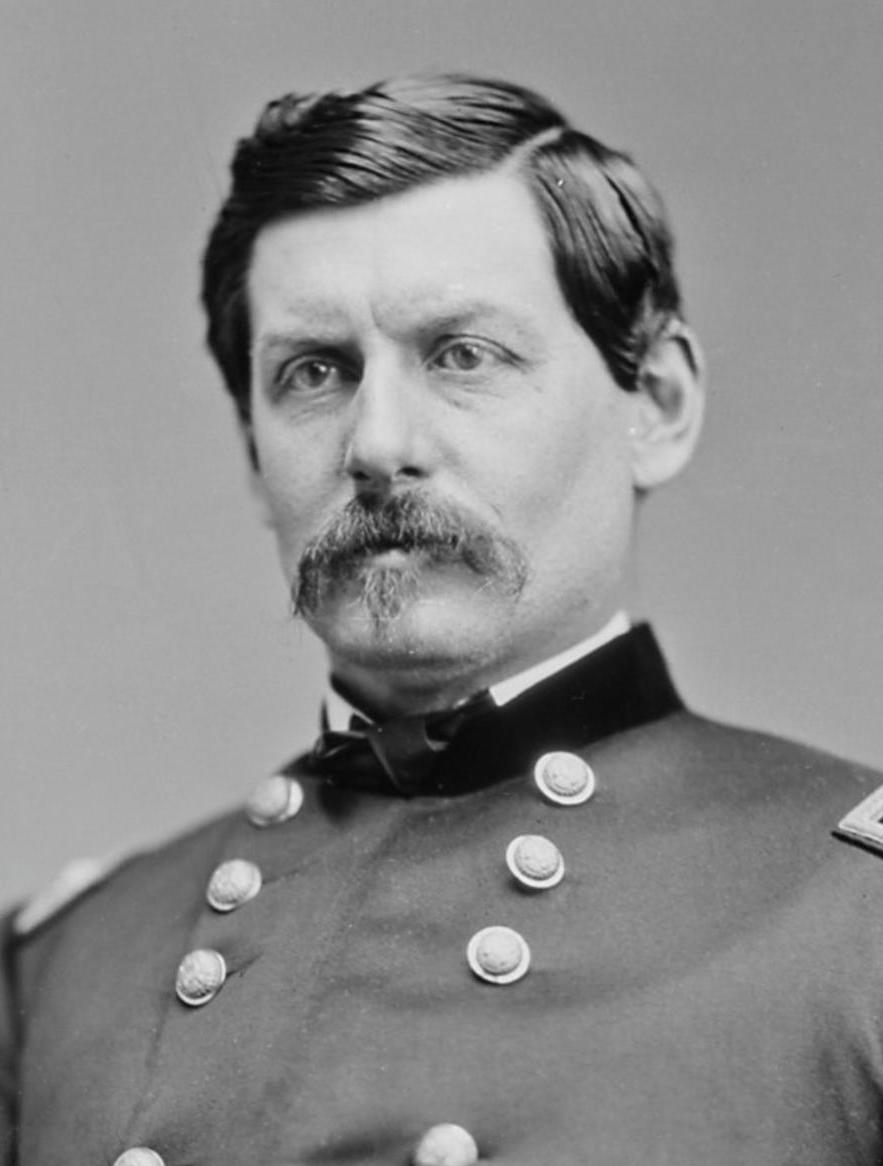
Nominee	Abraham Lincoln	George B. McClellan
Party	National Union	Democratic
Home state	Illinois	New Jersey
Running mate	Andrew Johnson	George H. Pendleton
Electoral vote	33	0
Popular vote	368,735	361,986
Percentage	50.46%	49.54%
County results
Lincoln
50–60%
60–70%
70–80%
McClellan
50–60%
60–70%
President before election
Abraham Lincoln
Republican
Elected President
Abraham Lincoln
National Union

The 1864 United States presidential election in New York took place on November 8, 1864, as part of the 1864 United States presidential election. Voters chose 33 representatives, or electors to the Electoral College, who voted for president and vice president.

New York voted for the National Union candidate, incumbent Republican president Abraham Lincoln and his running mate Andrew Johnson. They defeated the Democratic candidate George B. McClellan and his running mate George H. Pendleton. Lincoln won the state by a bare margin of 0.92%.

Although he lost the state, New York would prove to be McClellan's fourth strongest state after Kentucky, New Jersey, and Delaware.

== Results ==
1864 United States presidential election in New York (Note: Since New York voted for presidential electors directly, the totals below are based on the highest elector on each ticket.)
Party	Candidate	Running mate	Popular vote		Electoral vote	
Party	Candidate	Running mate	Count	%	Count	%
National Union	Abraham Lincoln of Illinois	Andrew Johnson of Tennessee	368,735	50.46%	33	100.00%
Democratic	George B. McClellan of New Jersey	George H. Pendleton of Ohio	361,986	49.54%	0	0.00%
Total			730,721	100.00%	33	100.00%

=== Results by county ===
County	Abraham Lincoln National Union		George B. McClellan (Note: The figures below are the votes for David C. Judson, one of two Democratic electors who received 361,986 votes. Judson's county by county figures add up correctly to the stated total. Some sources, namely the 1865 Tribune Almanac, cite the county results for Washington Hunt, but those county figures do not add up correctly.) Democratic		Margin		Total votes cast
County	#	%	#	%	#	%	Total votes cast
Albany	10,206	44.10%	12,935	55.90%	-2,729	-11.79%	23,141
Allegany	6,240	70.90%	2,561	29.10%	3,679	41.80%	8,801
Broome	5,003	61.44%	3,140	38.56%	1,863	22.88%	8,143
Cattaraugus	5,505	60.63%	3,575	39.37%	1,930	21.26%	9,080
Cayuga	7,534	63.09%	4,407	36.91%	3,127	26.19%	11,941
Chautauqua	8,700	68.55%	3,991	31.45%	4,709	37.11%	12,691
Chemung	3,292	51.43%	3,109	48.57%	183	2.86%	6,401
Chenango	5,552	57.92%	4,034	42.08%	1,518	15.84%	9,586
Clinton	3,471	49.47%	3,546	50.53%	-75	-1.07%	7,017
Columbia	4,876	48.20%	5,240	51.80%	-364	-3.60%	10,116
Cortland	3,983	65.88%	2,063	34.12%	1,920	31.76%	6,046
Delaware	5,297	55.49%	4,249	44.51%	1,048	10.98%	9,546
Dutchess	7,201	52.02%	6,643	47.98%	558	4.03%	13,844
Erie	13,061	49.42%	13,368	50.58%	-307	-1.16%	26,429
Essex	3,224	59.81%	2,166	40.19%	1,058	19.63%	5,390
Franklin	2,839	60.71%	1,837	39.29%	1,002	21.43%	4,676
Fulton (Note: Includes Hamilton County)	2,972	50.73%	2,887	49.27%	85	1.45%	5,859
Genesee	4,030	59.25%	2,772	40.75%	1,258	18.49%	6,802
Greene	3,087	44.20%	3,897	55.80%	-810	-11.60%	6,984
Herkimer	5,087	54.73%	4,208	45.27%	879	9.46%	9,295
Jefferson	8,592	59.53%	5,842	40.47%	2,750	19.05%	14,434
Kings	20,838	44.75%	25,727	55.25%	-4,889	-10.50%	46,565
Lewis	3,078	51.39%	2,911	48.61%	167	2.79%	5,989
Livingston	4,580	56.31%	3,553	43.69%	1,027	12.63%	8,133
Madison	6,182	62.26%	3,748	37.74%	2,434	24.51%	9,930
Monroe	10,203	52.84%	9,107	47.16%	1,096	5.68%	19,310
Montgomery	3,519	47.39%	3,907	52.61%	-388	-5.22%	7,426
New York	36,681	33.23%	73,707	66.77%	-37,026	-33.54%	110,388
Niagara	4,839	53.04%	4,285	46.96%	554	6.07%	9,124
Oneida	12,048	52.47%	10,914	47.53%	1,134	4.94%	22,962
Onondaga	10,996	55.79%	8,714	44.21%	2,282	11.58%	19,710
Ontario	5,409	57.56%	3,988	42.44%	1,421	15.12%	9,397
Orange	6,784	50.55%	6,637	49.45%	147	1.10%	13,421
Orleans	3,755	60.44%	2,458	39.56%	1,297	20.88%	6,213
Oswego	8,793	58.50%	6,238	41.50%	2,555	17.00%	15,031
Otsego	6,151	50.43%	6,046	49.57%	105	0.86%	12,197
Putnam	1,443	47.14%	1,618	52.86%	-175	-5.72%	3,061
Queens	4,284	44.24%	5,400	55.76%	-1,116	-11.52%	9,684
Rensselaer	9,159	49.41%	9,376	50.59%	-217	-1.17%	18,535
Richmond	1,564	35.23%	2,875	64.77%	-1,311	-29.53%	4,439
Rockland	1,445	38.72%	2,287	61.28%	-842	-22.56%	3,732
Saratoga	5,909	55.62%	4,715	44.38%	1,194	11.24%	10,624
Schenectady	2,263	49.50%	2,309	50.50%	-46	-1.01%	4,572
Schoharie	2,870	37.41%	4,801	62.59%	-1,931	-25.17%	7,671
Schuyler	2,576	57.64%	1,893	42.36%	683	15.28%	4,469
Seneca	2,680	45.06%	3,267	54.94%	-587	-9.87%	5,947
St. Lawrence	10,864	72.85%	4,048	27.15%	6,816	45.71%	14,912
Steuben	8,099	58.22%	5,813	41.78%	2,286	16.43%	13,912
Suffolk	4,305	51.66%	4,028	48.34%	277	3.32%	8,333
Sullivan	2,960	45.48%	3,548	54.52%	-588	-9.04%	6,508
Tioga	3,780	55.60%	3,018	44.40%	762	11.21%	6,798
Tompkins	4,518	60.14%	2,995	39.86%	1,523	20.27%	7,513
Ulster	6,900	47.05%	7,766	52.95%	-866	-5.90%	14,666
Warren	2,399	52.52%	2,169	47.48%	230	5.04%	4,568
Washington	6,221	63.07%	3,642	36.93%	2,579	26.15%	9,863
Wayne	6,122	58.23%	4,392	41.77%	1,730	16.45%	10,514
Westchester	7,607	44.85%	9,354	55.15%	-1,747	-10.30%	16,961
Wyoming	4,123	61.61%	2,569	38.39%	1,554	23.22%	6,692
Yates	3,036	64.20%	1,693	35.80%	1,343	28.40%	4,729
Totals	368,735	50.46%	361,986	49.54%	6,749	0.92%	730,721

=== New York City results ===
1864 presidential election New York City ward map

Results by ward
Ward	Lincoln Union		McClellan Democratic		Total
Ward	Votes	%	Votes	%	Votes
1	213	8.97%	2,162	91.03%	2,375
2	186	35.36%	340	64.64%	526
3	227	31.22%	500	68.78%	727
4	434	15.22%	2,417	84.78%	2,851
5	1,022	33.40%	2,038	66.60%	3,060
6	329	8.69%	3,457	91.31%	3,786
7	1,231	23.13%	4,090	76.87%	5,321
8	1,621	33.60%	3,203	66.40%	4,824
9	3,490	47.60%	3,842	52.40%	7,332
10	1,697	41.82%	2,361	58.18%	4,058
11	1,928	25.99%	5,490	74.01%	7,418
12	1,276	33.79%	2,500	66.21%	3,776
13	1,106	29.34%	2,663	70.66%	3,769
14	859	16.88%	4,229	83.12%	5,088
15	2,129	50.51%	2,086	49.49%	4,215
16	2,869	45.18%	3,481	54.82%	6,350
17	3,427	32.77%	7,031	67.23%	10,458
18	2,679	38.13%	4,347	61.87%	7,026
19	1,941	35.18%	3,576	64.82%	5,517
20	2,879	34.13%	5,557	65.87%	8,436
21	2,766	39.75%	4,192	60.25%	6,958
22	2,372	36.40%	4,145	63.60%	6,517
Totals	36,681	33.23%	73,707	66.77%	110,388

==== Counties that flipped from Democratic to National Union ====
- Orange

==== Counties that flipped from Republican to Democratic ====
- Clinton
- Columbia
- Erie
- Montgomery
- Schenectady
- Seneca
- Ulster

== See also ==
- United States presidential elections in New York
