= 1900 United States presidential election in New Jersey =

- November 6, 1900
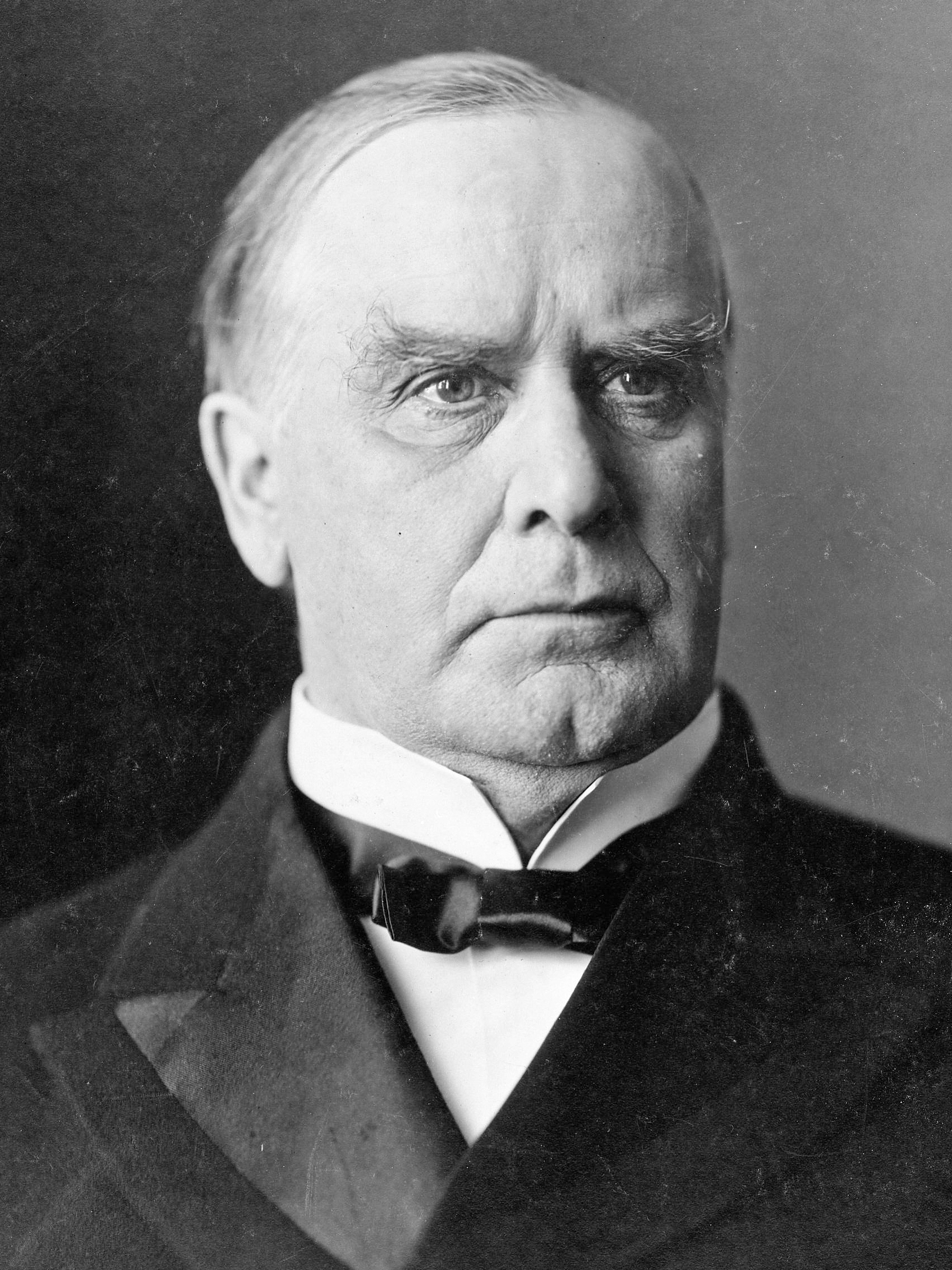

Nominee	William McKinley	William Jennings Bryan
Party	Republican	Democratic
Home state	Ohio	Nebraska
Running mate	Theodore Roosevelt	Adlai E. Stevenson
Electoral vote	10	0
Popular vote	221,754	164,879
Percentage	55.27%	41.10%
County results
McKinley
50–60%
60–70%
Bryan
50–60%
President before election
William McKinley
Republican
Elected President
William McKinley
Republican

The 1900 United States presidential election in New Jersey took place on November 6, 1900. Voters chose ten representatives, or electors to the Electoral College, who voted for president and vice president.

New Jersey overwhelmingly voted for the Republican nominee, President William McKinley, over the Democratic nominee, former U.S. Representative and 1896 Democratic presidential nominee William Jennings Bryan. McKinley won New Jersey by a margin of 14.17 points in this rematch of the 1896 presidential election. The return of economic prosperity and recent victory in the Spanish–American War helped McKinley to score a decisive victory.

Bryan had previously lost New Jersey to McKinley four years earlier and would later lose the state again in 1908 to William Howard Taft. McKinley was the first Republican to carry New Jersey more than once, and the only one to do so until Dwight D. Eisenhower in 1956.

== Results ==
1900 United States presidential election in New Jersey
Party	Candidate	Running mate	Popular vote		Electoral vote	
Party	Candidate	Running mate	Count	%	Count	%
Republican	William McKinley of Ohio (incumbent)	Theodore Roosevelt of New York	221,754	55.27%	10	100.00%
Democratic	William Jennings Bryan of Nebraska	Adlai Stevenson I of Illinois	164,879	41.10%	0	0.00%
Prohibition	John G. Woolley of Illinois	Henry B. Metcalf of Rhode Island	7,190	1.79%	0	0.00%
Socialist	Eugene V. Debs of Indiana	Job Harriman of California	4,611	1.15%	0	0.00%
Socialist Labor	Joseph F. Malloney of Massachusetts	Valentine Remmel of Pennsylvania	2,081	0.52%	0	0.00%
Populist	Wharton Barker of Pennsylvania	Ignatius L. Donnelly of Minnesota	691	0.17%	0	0.00%
Total			401,206	100.00%	10	100.00%

=== Results by county ===
County	William McKinley Republican		William Jennings Bryan Democratic		John G. Woolley Prohibition		Eugene V. Debs Socialist		Various candidates Other parties		Margin		Total votes cast
County	#	%	#	%	#	%	#	%	#	%	#	%	Total votes cast
Atlantic	6,122	67.68%	2,566	28.37%	277	3.06%	49	0.54%	32	0.35%	3,556	39.31%	9,046
Bergen	9,086	56.92%	6,456	40.44%	165	1.03%	179	1.12%	78	0.49%	2,630	16.47%	15,964
Burlington	8,381	57.87%	5,476	37.81%	507	3.50%	75	0.52%	43	0.30%	2,905	20.06%	14,482
Camden	16,148	66.49%	7,281	29.98%	553	2.28%	215	0.89%	91	0.37%	8,867	36.51%	24,288
Cape May	2,241	62.90%	1,110	31.15%	186	5.22%	11	0.31%	15	0.42%	1,131	31.74%	3,563
Cumberland	6,780	58.64%	4,036	34.91%	642	5.55%	66	0.57%	38	0.33%	2,744	23.73%	11,562
Essex	45,318	61.83%	25,735	35.11%	544	0.74%	1,003	1.37%	694	0.95%	19,583	26.72%	73,294
Gloucester	4,471	57.59%	2,829	36.44%	342	4.41%	87	1.12%	34	0.44%	1,642	21.15%	7,763
Hudson	32,341	44.53%	38,025	52.36%	353	0.49%	1,373	1.89%	536	0.74%	-5,684	-7.83%	72,628
Hunterdon	3,873	41.29%	5,136	54.75%	312	3.33%	34	0.36%	25	0.27%	-1,263	-13.46%	9,380
Mercer	13,874	61.67%	7,858	34.93%	450	2.00%	210	0.93%	106	0.47%	6,016	26.74%	22,498
Middlesex	9,348	55.19%	7,191	42.45%	216	1.28%	90	0.53%	93	0.55%	2,157	12.73%	16,938
Monmouth	10,363	53.11%	8,568	43.91%	419	2.15%	63	0.32%	101	0.52%	1,795	9.20%	19,514
Morris	7,739	54.47%	5,793	40.78%	490	3.45%	92	0.65%	93	0.65%	1,946	13.70%	14,207
Ocean	3,182	65.80%	1,414	29.24%	183	3.78%	25	0.52%	32	0.66%	1,768	36.56%	4,836
Passaic	15,619	52.98%	12,891	43.72%	259	0.88%	337	1.14%	377	1.28%	2,728	9.25%	29,483
Salem	3,398	50.64%	2,981	44.43%	272	4.05%	32	0.48%	27	0.40%	417	6.21%	6,710
Somerset	4,438	56.33%	3,183	40.40%	170	2.16%	50	0.63%	37	0.47%	1,255	15.93%	7,878
Sussex	2,874	44.36%	3,395	52.40%	138	2.13%	52	0.80%	20	0.31%	-521	-8.04%	6,479
Union	12522	58.93%	7665	36.07%	317	1.49%	494	2.32%	250	1.18%	4,857	22.86%	21,248
Warren	3,589	38.64%	5,219	56.18%	388	4.18%	72	0.78%	21	0.23%	-1,630	-17.55%	9,289
Totals	221,707	55.28%	164,808	41.09%	7,183	1.79%	4,609	1.15%	2,743	0.68%	56,899	14.19%	401,050

== See also ==
- Presidency of William McKinley
- Presidency of Theodore Roosevelt
- United States presidential elections in New Jersey
