= 1920 United States presidential election in New Jersey =

- November 2, 1920
- Turnout: 81.38%
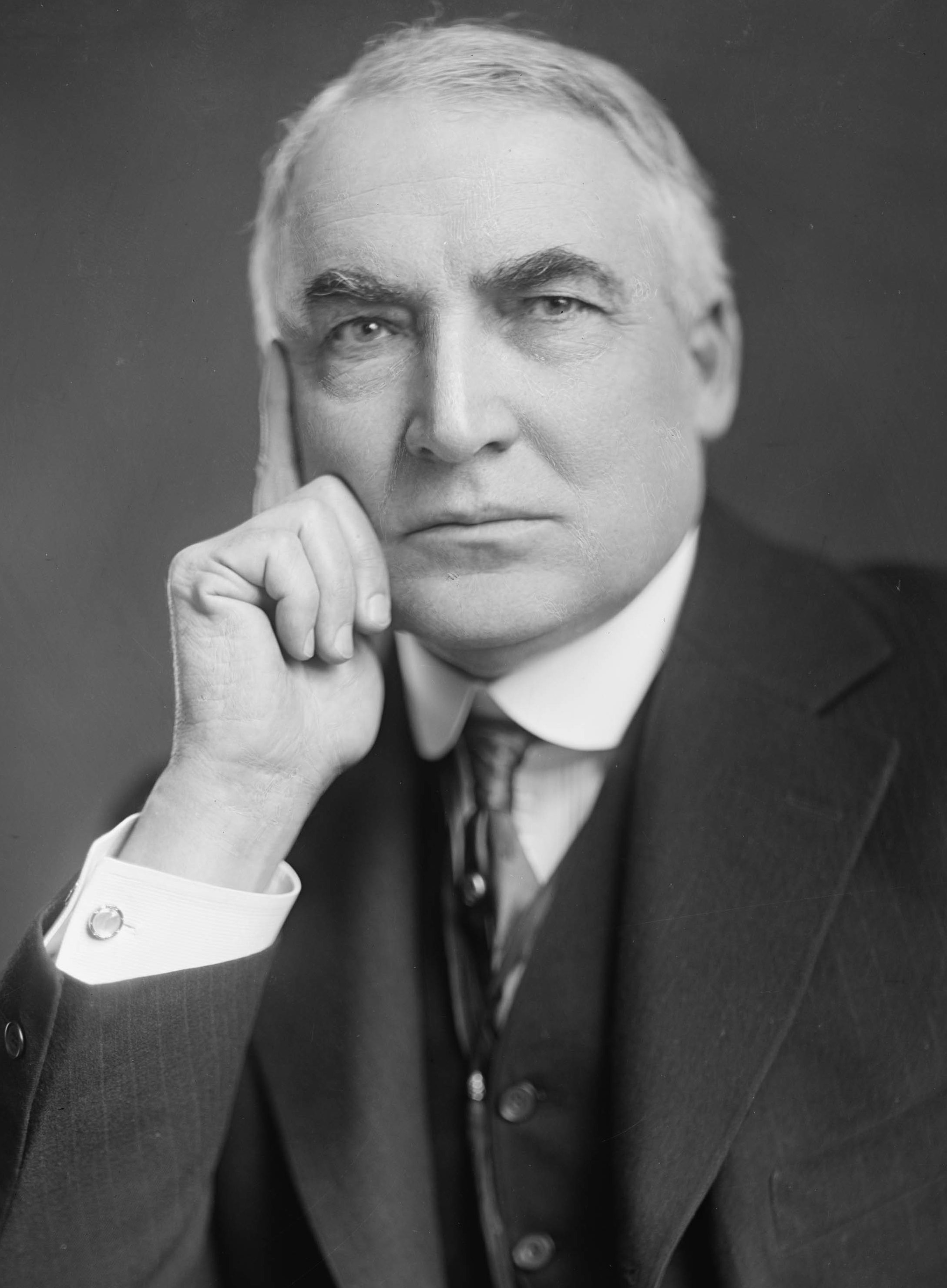

Nominee	Warren G. Harding	James M. Cox
Party	Republican	Democratic
Home state	Ohio	Ohio
Running mate	Calvin Coolidge	Franklin D. Roosevelt
Electoral vote	14	0
Popular vote	611,541	256,887
Percentage	67.65%	28.42%
County results
Harding
50–60%
60–70%
70–80%
President before election
Woodrow Wilson
Democratic
Elected President
Warren G. Harding
Republican

The 1920 United States presidential election in New Jersey took place on November 2, 1920. All contiguous 48 states were part of the 1920 United States presidential election. Voters chose 14 electors to the Electoral College, which selected the president and vice president.

New Jersey was won in a landslide by the Republican nominees, Senator Warren G. Harding of Ohio and his running mate Governor Calvin Coolidge of Massachusetts. Harding and Coolidge defeated the Democratic nominees, Governor James M. Cox of Ohio and his running mate Assistant Secretary of the Navy Franklin D. Roosevelt of New York. Also running that year was Socialist candidate Eugene V. Debs of Indiana and his running mate Seymour Stedman of Illinois.

Harding carried New Jersey overwhelmingly with 67.65 percent of the vote to Cox's 28.42 percent, a victory margin of 39.23%. This is the highest popular vote percentage ever recorded by any candidate in New Jersey. On the county level map, reflecting the decisiveness of his victory, Harding became the first presidential nominee to sweep all 21 of New Jersey's counties, a feat later accomplished only by Dwight D. Eisenhower in 1956, Lyndon B. Johnson in 1964 and Richard Nixon in 1972.

He was the first Republican to ever carry Warren County and Hunterdon County and only the second after William McKinley in 1896 to carry Sussex County, which had been historically hostile to Yankee New England and Democratic ever since the Second Party System. Harding broke sixty percent of the vote in seventeen counties and seventy percent in nine of those.

Debs finished in a distant but fairly solid, for a third-party candidate, third with 3.00 percent.

Like much of the Northeast, New Jersey in this era was a staunchly Republican state, having not given a majority of the vote to a Democratic presidential candidate since 1892. With the deeply unpopular Democratic administration of Woodrow Wilson as the backdrop for the 1920 campaign, Warren G. Harding promised a "return to normalcy" that appealed to many voters, while Cox was tied to the policies of the Wilson administration. Harding won nationally in one of the most decisive landslides in American history, and New Jersey, already a fiercely Republican state, went even harder for Harding than the nation, making New Jersey a solid 13 points more Republican than the national average.

As of 2020, this remains the strongest ever performance by any presidential candidate in New Jersey; no candidate has ever exceeded Harding's share of the popular vote or his margin of victory. The elections of 1920 and 1924 would prove to be the Republican Party's high mark in the state of New Jersey, the culmination of an era of Republican dominance in the state beginning in 1896. By 1928, the state would begin trending Democratic when the Democratic Party nominated Al Smith, a New York City native and Roman Catholic of Irish, Italian and German immigrant heritage who appealed greatly to urban New Jersey voters, and beginning in 1932, the state would vote Democratic in all four of Democrat Franklin Roosevelt's elections with the rise of the New Deal Coalition. Hudson County would not vote Republican until 1956.

== Results ==
1920 United States presidential election in New Jersey
Party	Candidate	Votes	Percentage	Electoral votes
Republican	Warren G. Harding	611,541	67.65%	14
Democratic	James M. Cox	256,887	28.42%	0
Socialist	Eugene V. Debs	27,141	3.00%	0
National Prohibition	Aaron S. Watkins	4,734	0.52%	0
Farmer–Labor	Parley P. Christensen	2,200	0.24%	0
Socialist Labor	William Wesley Cox	923	0.10%	0
Single Tax	Robert Macauley	517	0.06%	0
Totals		903,943	100.0%	14

=== Results by county ===
County	Warren G. Harding Republican		James M. Cox Democratic		Eugene V. Debs Socialist		Aaron S. Watkins National Prohibition		Various candidates Other parties		Margin		Total votes cast (Note: These totals are the average elector for each slate.)
County	#	%	#	%	#	%	#	%	#	%	#	%	Total votes cast
Atlantic	21,245	76.63%	5,753	20.75%	390	1.41%	287	1.04%	50	0.18%	15,492	55.88%	27,725
Bergen	47,512	76.26%	12,396	19.90%	1,849	2.97%	155	0.25%	393	0.63%	35,116	56.36%	62,305
Burlington	17,898	68.73%	7,532	28.92%	229	0.88%	318	1.22%	64	0.25%	10,366	39.81%	26,041
Camden	40,771	65.67%	17,893	28.82%	2,467	3.97%	725	1.17%	231	0.37%	22,878	36.85%	62,087
Cape May	5,785	70.76%	2,198	26.89%	107	1.31%	77	0.94%	8	0.10%	3,587	43.88%	8,175
Cumberland	11,913	68.36%	4,487	25.75%	473	2.71%	501	2.87%	53	0.30%	7,426	42.61%	17,427
Essex	116,168	70.90%	40,970	25.00%	5,939	3.62%	176	0.11%	595	0.36%	75,198	45.89%	163,848
Gloucester	11,693	66.60%	4,869	27.73%	225	1.28%	752	4.28%	18	0.10%	6,824	38.87%	17,557
Hudson	101,759	59.58%	62,637	36.67%	5,454	3.19%	34	0.02%	909	0.53%	39,122	22.91%	170,793
Hunterdon	7,443	54.38%	6,067	44.33%	76	0.56%	80	0.58%	20	0.15%	1,376	10.05%	13,686
Mercer	29,626	63.46%	15,713	33.66%	1,169	2.50%	69	0.15%	106	0.23%	13,913	29.80%	46,683
Middlesex	29,334	69.70%	11,618	27.60%	848	2.01%	139	0.33%	149	0.35%	17,716	42.09%	42,088
Monmouth	28,818	68.07%	12,975	30.65%	291	0.69%	162	0.38%	90	0.21%	15,843	37.42%	42,336
Morris	20,686	71.50%	7,256	25.08%	578	2.00%	284	0.98%	127	0.44%	13,430	46.42%	28,931
Ocean	6,840	74.84%	2,138	23.39%	96	1.05%	53	0.58%	12	0.13%	4,702	51.45%	9,139
Passaic	42,692	72.08%	11,873	20.05%	4,153	7.01%	108	0.18%	399	0.67%	30,819	52.04%	59,225
Salem	7,638	66.50%	3,483	30.33%	98	0.85%	253	2.20%	13	0.11%	4,155	36.18%	11,485
Somerset	10,962	71.02%	4,192	27.16%	163	1.06%	80	0.52%	38	0.25%	6,770	43.86%	15,435
Sussex	5,224	58.75%	3,516	39.54%	42	0.47%	97	1.09%	13	0.15%	1,708	19.21%	8,892
Union	39,409	72.57%	12,103	22.29%	2,353	4.33%	122	0.22%	316	0.58%	27,306	50.28%	54,303
Warren	8,035	51.23%	7,218	46.02%	192	1.22%	202	1.29%	36	0.23%	817	5.21%	15,683
Totals	611,451 (Note: The total for this candidate differs from the official total by the Manual of the Legislature of New Jersey)	67.65%	256,887	28.42%	27,192	3.01%	4,674	0.52%	3,640	0.40%	354,564	39.23%	903,844

== See also ==
- Presidency of Warren G. Harding
- Presidency of Calvin Coolidge
- United States presidential elections in New Jersey
