= 1952 United States presidential election in New Jersey =

- November 4, 1952
- Turnout: 88.75% (▲5.73%)

Nominee	Dwight D. Eisenhower	Adlai Stevenson
Party	Republican	Democratic
Home state	New York	Illinois
Running mate	Richard Nixon	John Sparkman
Electoral vote	16	0
Popular vote	1,374,613	1,015,902
Percentage	56.81%	41.99%
County results
Eisenhower
50–60%
60–70%
70–80%
Stevenson
40–50%
50–60%
President before election
Harry S. Truman
Democratic
Elected President
Dwight D. Eisenhower
Republican

The 1952 United States presidential election in New Jersey took place on November 4, 1952. All contemporary 48 states were part of the 1952 United States presidential election. Voters chose 16 electors to the Electoral College, which selected the president and vice president.

New Jersey was won by the Republican nominees, General Dwight D. Eisenhower of New York and his running mate Senator Richard Nixon of California. Eisenhower and Nixon defeated the Democratic nominees, former Governor Adlai Stevenson of Illinois and his running mate Senator John Sparkman of Alabama.

Eisenhower carried New Jersey with 56.81% of the vote to Stevenson's 41.99%, a margin of 14.83%. Eisenhower won 18 of the state's 21 counties, breaking 60% of the vote in nine of them, and even breaking 70% in three of those. Stevenson carried three urban counties; he won with majorities in Mercer County and Camden County, and won with a plurality in Hudson County. Eisenhower ultimately won election to the White House as a war hero, a political outsider, and a moderate Republican who pledged to protect and support popular New Deal Democratic policies, finally ending 20 years of Democratic control of the White House.

New Jersey in this era was usually a swing state with a slight Republican lean, and its results in 1952 adhered to that pattern. Democrat Franklin D. Roosevelt had won New Jersey in all four of his decisive nationwide victories in the 1930s and 1940s, but with the exception of his 1936 landslide, always by very narrow margins. In 1948, New Jersey had been narrowly won by Republican Thomas E. Dewey, even as he lost the election nationally. With Eisenhower's personal popularity propelling him to a decisive nationwide victory in 1952, New Jersey easily remained in the Republican column, its results making it about 4% more Republican than the national average.

Republicans won Passaic, Salem, and Middlesex counties for the first time since 1928. This was the first election since 1868 that a Republican won the election without Mercer County, and the first since 1860 to do so without Camden County.

== Results ==
1952 United States presidential election in New Jersey
Party	Candidate	Votes	Percentage	Electoral votes
Republican	Dwight D. Eisenhower	1,374,613	56.81%	16
Democratic	Adlai Stevenson	1,015,902	41.99%	0
Socialist	Darlington Hoopes	8,593	0.36%	0
Socialist Labor	Eric Hass	5,815	0.24%	0
Progressive	Vincent Hallinan	5,589	0.23%	0
Poor Man's Party	Henry B. Krajewski	4,203	0.17%	0
Socialist Workers	Farrell Dobbs	3,850	0.16%	0
Prohibition	Stuart Hamblen	989	0.04%	0
Totals		2,419,554	100.0%	16

=== Results by county ===
County	Dwight D. Eisenhower Republican		Adlai Stevenson Democratic		Various candidates Other parties		Margin		Total votes cast
County	#	%	#	%	#	%	#	%	Total votes cast
Atlantic	40,259	58.03%	28,953	41.73%	163	0.24%	11,306	16.30%	69,375
Bergen	212,842	69.22%	93,373	30.37%	1,287	0.41%	119,469	38.85%	307,502
Burlington	30,202	54.18%	25,482	45.71%	60	0.11%	4,720	8.47%	55,744
Camden	72,335	46.81%	81,444	52.70%	762	0.49%	-9,109	-5.89%	154,541
Cape May	15,218	68.52%	6,984	31.45%	7	0.03%	8,234	37.07%	22,209
Cumberland	21,819	53.40%	18,929	46.33%	111	0.27%	2,890	7.07%	40,859
Essex	219,863	53.94%	180,501	44.28%	7,271	1.78%	39,362	9.66%	407,635
Gloucester	25,103	54.89%	20,536	44.90%	98	0.21%	4,567	9.99%	45,737
Hudson	153,583	47.36%	161,469	49.79%	9,228	2.85%	-7,886	-2.43%	324,280
Hunterdon	14,439	67.47%	6,878	32.14%	83	0.39%	7,561	35.33%	21,400
Mercer	50,423	46.40%	57,751	53.15%	488	0.45%	-7,328	-6.75%	108,662
Middlesex	73,577	50.32%	70,234	48.03%	2,413	1.65%	3,343	2.29%	146,224
Monmouth	73,228	66.28%	37,006	33.49%	257	0.23%	36,222	32.79%	110,491
Morris	62,847	72.55%	23,662	27.31%	120	0.14%	39,185	45.24%	86,629
Ocean	23,490	72.80%	8,660	26.84%	117	0.36%	14,830	45.96%	32,267
Passaic	89,083	54.26%	70,727	43.08%	4,380	2.66%	18,356	11.18%	164,190
Salem	12,026	51.30%	11,362	48.47%	54	0.23%	664	2.83%	23,442
Somerset	31,239	63.34%	18,007	36.51%	74	0.15%	13,232	26.83%	49,320
Sussex	13,415	74.68%	4,534	25.24%	14	0.08%	8,881	49.44%	17,963
Union	122,885	60.46%	78,336	38.54%	2,024	1.00%	44,549	21.92%	203,245
Warren	15,737	58.63%	11,074	41.26%	28	0.11%	4,663	17.37%	26,839
Totals	1,374,613	56.81%	1,015,902	41.99%	29,039	1.20%	358,711	14.82%	2,419,554

==== Counties that flipped from Democratic to Republican ====
- Middlesex
- Passaic
- Salem

=== Results by congressional districts ===
Eisenhower won 11 out of 14 of New Jersey's congressional districts, while Stevenson won the other three congressional districts.

District	Eisenhower	Stevenson	Representative
1st	48.1%	51.9%	Charles A. Wolverton
2nd	58.5%	41.5%	T. Millet Hand
3rd	62.9%	37.1%	James C. Auchincloss
4th	49.2%	50.8%	Charles R. Howell
5th	62.4%	37.6%	Charles Aubrey Eaton (82nd Congress)
5th	62.4%	37.6%	Peter Frelinghuysen Jr. (83rd Congress)
6th	61.1%	38.9%	Clifford P. Case
7th	68.5%	31.5%	William B. Widnall
8th	55.7%	44.3%	Gordon Canfield
9th	67.6%	32.4%	Frank C. Osmers Jr.
10th	54.3%	45.7%	Peter W. Rodino
11th	53.1%	46.9%	Hugh J. Addonizio
12th	55.5%	44.5%	Robert Kean
13th	44.8%	55.2%	Alfred Dennis Sieminski
14th	51.9%	48.1%	Edward J. Hart

== See also ==
- Presidency of Dwight D. Eisenhower
- United States presidential elections in New Jersey
