= 1864 United States presidential election in Delaware =

- November 8, 1864
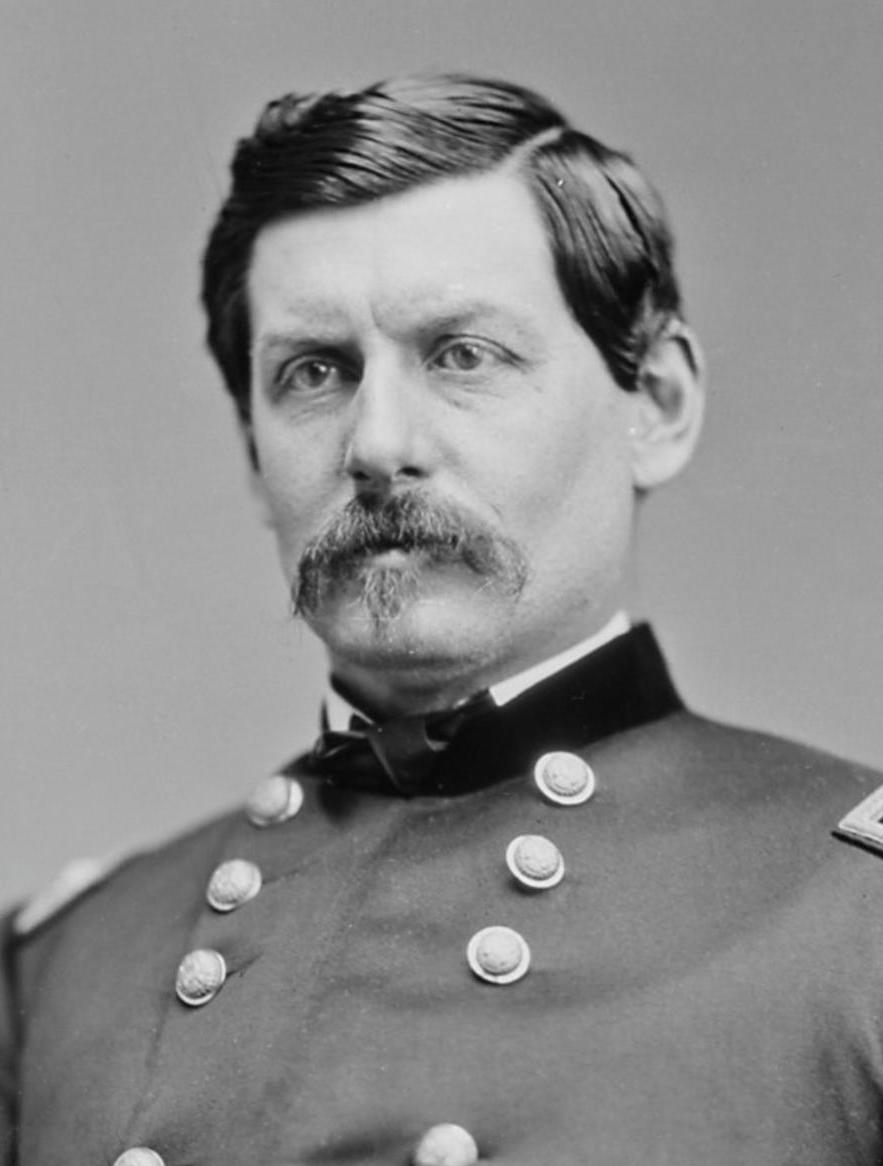

Nominee	George B. McClellan	Abraham Lincoln
Party	Democratic	National Union
Home state	New Jersey	Illinois
Running mate	George H. Pendleton	Andrew Johnson
Electoral vote	3	0
Popular vote	8,767	8,155
Percentage	51.81%	48.19%
County results
McClellan
50–60%
Lincoln
50–60%
President before election
Abraham Lincoln
Republican
Elected President
Abraham Lincoln
National Union

The 1864 United States presidential election in Delaware took place on November 8, 1864, as part of the 1864 United States presidential election. State voters chose three representatives, or electors, to the Electoral College, who voted for president and vice president.

Delaware was won by the Democratic nominee, 4th Commanding General of the United States Army George B. McClellan of New Jersey and his running mate Representative George H. Pendleton. They defeated the National Union nominee, incumbent President Abraham Lincoln of Illinois and his running mate Senator and Military Governor of Tennessee Andrew Johnson. McClellan won the state by a narrow margin of 3.62%.

With 51.81% of the popular vote, Delaware would prove to be McClellan's third strongest state after Kentucky and New Jersey, his only two other winning states.

== Results ==
General Election Results
Party	Pledged to	Elector	Votes
Democratic Party	George B. McClellan	Victor du Pont	8,767
Democratic Party	George B. McClellan	Harbeson Hickman	8,764
Democratic Party	George B. McClellan	Ayres Stockly	8,763
National Union Party	Abraham Lincoln	Daniel Corbit	8,155
National Union Party	Abraham Lincoln	James R. Clements	8,154
National Union Party	Abraham Lincoln	John C. Hazzard	8,152
Votes cast (Note: Based on highest elector on each ticket)			16,922

=== Results by county ===
County	George B. McClellan Democratic		Abraham Lincoln Union		Margin		Total votes cast
County	#	%	#	%	#	%	Total votes cast
Kent	2,402	59.25%	1,652	40.75%	750	18.50%	4,054
New Castle	3,813	47.15%	4,274	52.85%	-461	5.70%	8,087
Sussex	2,552	53.38%	2,229	46.62%	323	6.76%	4,781
Totals	8,767	51.81%	8,155	48.19%	612	3.62%	16,922

==== Counties that flipped from Southern Democratic to Democratic ====
- Kent
- Sussex

==== Counties that flipped from Southern Democratic to Republican ====
- New Castle

== See also ==
- United States presidential elections in Delaware
