= 1908 United States presidential election in New Jersey =

- November 3, 1908

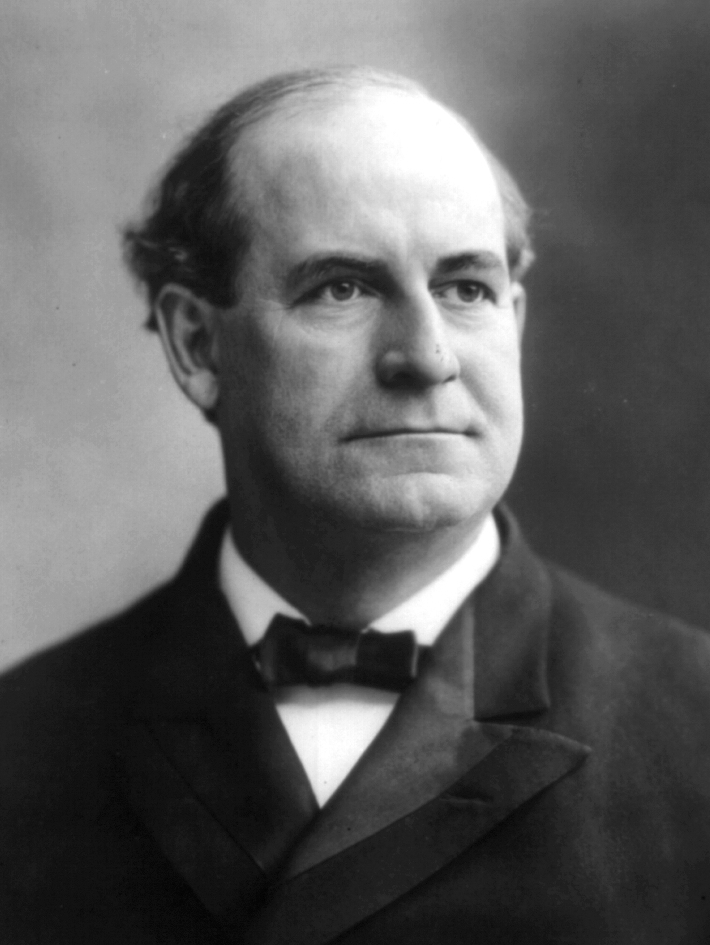
Nominee	William Howard Taft	William Jennings Bryan
Party	Republican	Democratic
Home state	Ohio	Nebraska
Running mate	James S. Sherman	John W. Kern
Electoral vote	12	0
Popular vote	265,298	182,522
Percentage	56.80%	39.07%
County results
Taft
40–50%
50–60%
60–70%
Bryan
50–60%
President before election
Theodore Roosevelt
Republican
Elected President
William Howard Taft
Republican

The 1908 United States presidential election in New Jersey took place on November 3, 1908. All contemporary 46 states were part of the 1908 United States presidential election. Voters chose 14 electors to the Electoral College, which selected the president and vice president.

New Jersey was won by the Republican nominees, United States Secretary of War William Howard Taft of Ohio and his running mate Congressman James S. Sherman of New York. Taft and Sherman defeated the Democratic nominees, former Congressman and two-time prior presidential candidate William Jennings Bryan of Nebraska and his running mate Senator John W. Kern of Indiana. Also in the running was the Socialist Party candidate, Eugene V. Debs, who ran with Ben Hanford.

Taft carried New Jersey comfortably with 56.80 percent of the vote to Bryan's 39.07 percent, a victory margin of 17.72 percent.

Eugene Debs came in a distant third, with 2.19 percent.

Like much of the Northeast, New Jersey in the early decades of the 20th century was a staunchly Republican state, having not given a majority of the vote to a Democratic presidential candidate since 1892. While winning a comfortable victory nationwide, Taft easily held New Jersey in the Republican column in 1908. On the county-level map, Taft carried 18 of the state's 21 counties, breaking 60% of the vote in 8 counties. Bryan won only the three rural counties in western North Jersey, Warren, Sussex, and Hunterdon, which had long been non-Yankee Democratic enclaves in the otherwise Republican Northeast.

New Jersey's election result in 1908 made the state over 9% more Republican than the national average. This is the last time a Republican won the election without Hunterdon, Warren, and Sussex counties.

Bryan had previously lost New Jersey twice to William McKinley in 1896 and 1900.

== Results ==
1908 United States presidential election in New Jersey
Party	Candidate	Votes	Percentage	Electoral votes
Republican	William Howard Taft	265,298	56.80%	12
Democratic	William Jennings Bryan	182,522	39.07%	0
Socialist	Eugene V. Debs	10,249	2.19%	0
Prohibition	Eugene W. Chafin	4,930	1.06%	0
Independence League	Thomas L. Hisgen	2,916	0.62%	0
Socialist Labor	August Gillhaus	1,196	0.26%	0
Totals		467,111	100.0%	12

=== Results by county ===
County	William Howard Taft Republican		William Jennings Bryan Democratic		Eugene V. Debs Socialist		Eugene W. Chafin Prohibition		Various candidates Other parties		Margin		Total votes cast
County	#	%	#	%	#	%	#	%	#	%	#	%	Total votes cast
Atlantic	8,822	63.71%	4,577	33.05%	76	0.55%	342	2.47%	30	0.22%	4,245	30.66%	13,847
Bergen	14,042	61.51%	7,628	33.42%	575	2.52%	219	0.96%	364	1.59%	6,414	28.10%	22,828
Burlington	9,020	57.16%	6,274	39.76%	140	0.89%	299	1.89%	46	0.29%	2,746	17.40%	15,779
Camden	18,999	61.32%	10,469	33.79%	697	2.25%	711	2.29%	107	0.35%	8,530	27.53%	30,983
Cape May	2,937	63.27%	1,553	33.46%	33	0.71%	111	2.39%	8	0.17%	1,384	29.81%	4,642
Cumberland	6,770	56.56%	4,521	37.77%	158	1.32%	476	3.98%	45	0.38%	2,249	18.79%	11,970
Essex	53,687	61.71%	30,191	34.70%	2,205	2.53%	317	0.36%	604	0.69%	23,496	27.01%	87,004
Gloucester	5,318	56.37%	3,707	39.29%	72	0.76%	322	3.41%	15	0.16%	1,611	17.08%	9,434
Hudson	41,967	48.91%	39,637	46.20%	2,776	3.24%	172	0.20%	1,244	1.45%	2,330	2.72%	85,796
Hunterdon	3,733	43.04%	4,737	54.62%	29	0.33%	140	1.61%	34	0.39%	-1,004	-11.58%	8,673
Mercer	14,941	58.99%	9,289	36.67%	687	2.71%	284	1.12%	128	0.51%	5,652	22.31%	25,329
Middlesex	11,261	57.57%	7,940	40.59%	98	0.50%	134	0.69%	127	0.65%	3,321	16.98%	19,560
Monmouth	12,519	56.29%	9,252	41.60%	137	0.62%	204	0.92%	127	0.57%	3,267	14.69%	22,239
Morris	9,089	61.16%	5,026	33.82%	367	2.47%	243	1.64%	137	0.92%	4,063	27.34%	14,862
Ocean	3,326	65.15%	1,634	32.01%	22	0.43%	89	1.74%	34	0.67%	1,692	33.14%	5,105
Passaic	17,635	55.96%	11,961	37.96%	1,086	3.45%	241	0.76%	588	1.87%	5,674	18.01%	31,511
Salem	3,713	52.91%	3,173	45.22%	36	0.51%	88	1.25%	7	0.10%	540	7.70%	7,017
Somerset	5,043	59.43%	3,271	38.55%	24	0.28%	94	1.11%	53	0.62%	1,772	20.88%	8,485
Sussex	2,653	44.25%	3,214	53.61%	36	0.60%	70	1.17%	22	0.37%	-561	-9.36%	5,995
Union	15,919	60.90%	8,806	33.69%	912	3.49%	132	0.50%	370	1.42%	7,113	27.21%	26,139
Warren	3,904	39.38%	5,662	57.12%	83	0.84%	242	2.44%	22	0.22%	-1,758	-17.73%	9,913
Totals	265,298	56.80%	182,522	39.07%	10,249	2.19%	4,930	1.06%	4,112	0.88%	82,776	17.72%	467,111

== See also ==
- Presidency of William Howard Taft
- United States presidential elections in New Jersey
