= 1956 United States presidential election in New Jersey =

- November 6, 1956
- Turnout: 87.59% (▼1.16%)

Nominee	Dwight D. Eisenhower	Adlai Stevenson
Party	Republican	Democratic
Home state	Pennsylvania (Note: Although he was born in Texas and grew up in Kansas before his military career, at the time of the 1952 election Eisenhower was president of Columbia University and was, officially, a resident of New York. During his first term as president, he moved his private residence to Gettysburg, Pennsylvania, and officially changed his residency to Pennsylvania.)	Illinois
Running mate	Richard Nixon	Estes Kefauver
Electoral vote	16	0
Popular vote	1,606,942	850,337
Percentage	64.68%	34.23%
County results
Eisenhower
50–60%
60–70%
70–80%
80–90%
President before election
Dwight D. Eisenhower
Republican
Elected President
Dwight D. Eisenhower
Republican

The 1956 United States presidential election in New Jersey took place on November 6, 1956. All contemporary 48 states were part of the 1956 United States presidential election. Voters chose 16 electors to the Electoral College, which selected the president and vice president.

New Jersey was won overwhelmingly by the Republican nominees, incumbent President Dwight D. Eisenhower of Pennsylvania and his running mate, incumbent Vice President Richard Nixon of California. Eisenhower and Nixon defeated the Democratic nominees, former Governor Adlai Stevenson of Illinois and his running mate, Senator Estes Kefauver of Tennessee.

Eisenhower carried New Jersey in a landslide with 64.68% of the vote to Stevenson's 34.23%, a margin of 30.46%. Eisenhower's decisive 1956 landslide represented a dramatic swing in the state in his favor. In his initial 1952 match against Stevenson, Eisenhower had also comfortably won New Jersey, but by a smaller margin, taking 56.81% of the vote to Stevenson's 41.99%, a margin of 14.83%. Eisenhower's 30.46% margin of victory in 1956 was thus more than double the margin by which he had won the state in 1952, marking a swing of over 15 points in Eisenhower's favor.

Eisenhower's landslide gains in the state were also evident on the county map. Whereas in 1952, Eisenhower had lost three counties to Stevenson, in 1956 Eisenhower decisively swept all 21 counties in the state of New Jersey, breaking 60% of the vote in all but three, breaking 70% in seven, and even breaking 80% in rural Sussex County. In urban, Democratic-leaning Hudson County, which Stevenson had narrowly won with a plurality in 1952, Eisenhower won decisively with over 60% of the vote in 1956. Eisenhower also picked up victories in Mercer County and Camden County, both of which had given majorities to Stevenson in 1952. He was only the second presidential nominee to sweep all New Jersey's counties after Warren G. Harding in 1920.

New Jersey in this era was usually a swing state with a slight Republican lean. However, Eisenhower's overwhelming personal popularity in the Northeast in 1956 led him to perform unusually strongly in New Jersey. The state usually voted very similarly to the nation as a whole, with a slight Republican tilt, as in 1952 when its results had been just 4% more Republican than the national average. Nevertheless, in 1956 the state swung especially hard in Eisenhower's favor. Even as Eisenhower won a slightly more convincing victory nationwide than he had in 1952, New Jersey swung much more than the nation, and its result in the 1956 election made the state more than 15% more Republican than the national average, making it the sixth most Republican state in the union.

Hudson County voted Republican for the first time since 1920, and Mercer and Camden counties since 1932.

== Results ==
1956 United States presidential election in New Jersey
Party	Candidate	Votes	Percentage	Electoral votes
Republican	Dwight D. Eisenhower (incumbent)	1,606,942	64.68%	16
Democratic	Adlai Stevenson	850,337	34.23%	0
Prohibition	Enoch A. Holtwick	9,147	0.37%	0
Socialist Labor	Eric Hass	6,736	0.27%	0
Conservative	T. Coleman Andrews	5,317	0.21%	0
Socialist Workers	Farrell Dobbs	4,004	0.16%	0
American Third Party	Henry B. Krajewski	1,829	0.07%	0
Totals		2,484,312	100.0%	16

=== Results by county ===
County	Dwight D. Eisenhower Republican		Adlai Stevenson Democratic		Various candidates Other parties		Margin		Total votes cast
County	#	%	#	%	#	%	#	%	Total votes cast
Atlantic	44,698	65.70%	21,668	31.85%	1,672	2.46%	23,030	33.85%	68,038
Bergen	254,334	75.22%	82,169	24.30%	1,610	0.48%	172,165	50.92%	338,113
Burlington	38,145	61.06%	24,258	38.83%	68	0.11%	13,887	22.23%	62,471
Camden	85,067	52.85%	75,152	46.69%	734	0.46%	9,915	6.16%	160,953
Cape May	16,887	74.02%	5,897	25.85%	31	0.14%	10,990	48.17%	22,815
Cumberland	24,067	58.07%	17,309	41.76%	68	0.16%	6,758	16.31%	41,444
Essex	234,682	60.45%	146,313	37.68%	7,258	1.87%	88,369	22.77%	388,253
Gloucester	30,646	60.41%	20,007	39.44%	75	0.15%	10,639	20.97%	50,728
Hudson	183,919	61.80%	107,098	35.99%	6,568	2.21%	76,821	25.81%	297,585
Hunterdon	16,150	72.77%	5,957	26.84%	86	0.39%	10,193	45.93%	22,193
Mercer	56,029	51.35%	52,684	48.29%	392	0.36%	3,345	3.06%	109,105
Middlesex	100,071	60.54%	64,538	39.05%	677	0.41%	35,533	21.49%	165,286
Monmouth	83,828	71.80%	32,329	27.69%	594	0.51%	51,499	44.11%	116,751
Morris	76,571	79.37%	19,503	20.22%	395	0.41%	57,068	59.15%	96,469
Ocean	28,033	74.80%	9,367	24.99%	79	0.21%	18,666	49.81%	37,479
Passaic	101,182	60.71%	61,859	37.11%	3,635	2.18%	39,323	23.60%	166,676
Salem	14,091	60.16%	9,276	39.60%	56	0.24%	4,815	20.56%	23,423
Somerset	37,930	71.85%	14,529	27.52%	330	0.63%	23,401	44.33%	52,789
Sussex	15,867	80.67%	3,756	19.10%	46	0.23%	12,111	61.57%	19,669
Union	146,228	67.57%	67,540	31.21%	2,646	1.22%	78,688	36.36%	216,414
Warren	18,517	66.95%	9,128	33.00%	13	0.05%	9,389	33.95%	27,658
Totals	1,606,942	64.68%	850,337	34.23%	27,033	1.09%	756,605	30.45%	2,484,312

==== Counties that flipped from Democratic to Republican ====
- Hudson
- Mercer
- Camden

== See also ==
- Presidency of Dwight D. Eisenhower
- United States presidential elections in New Jersey
