= 1872 United States presidential election in New Jersey =

- November 5, 1872
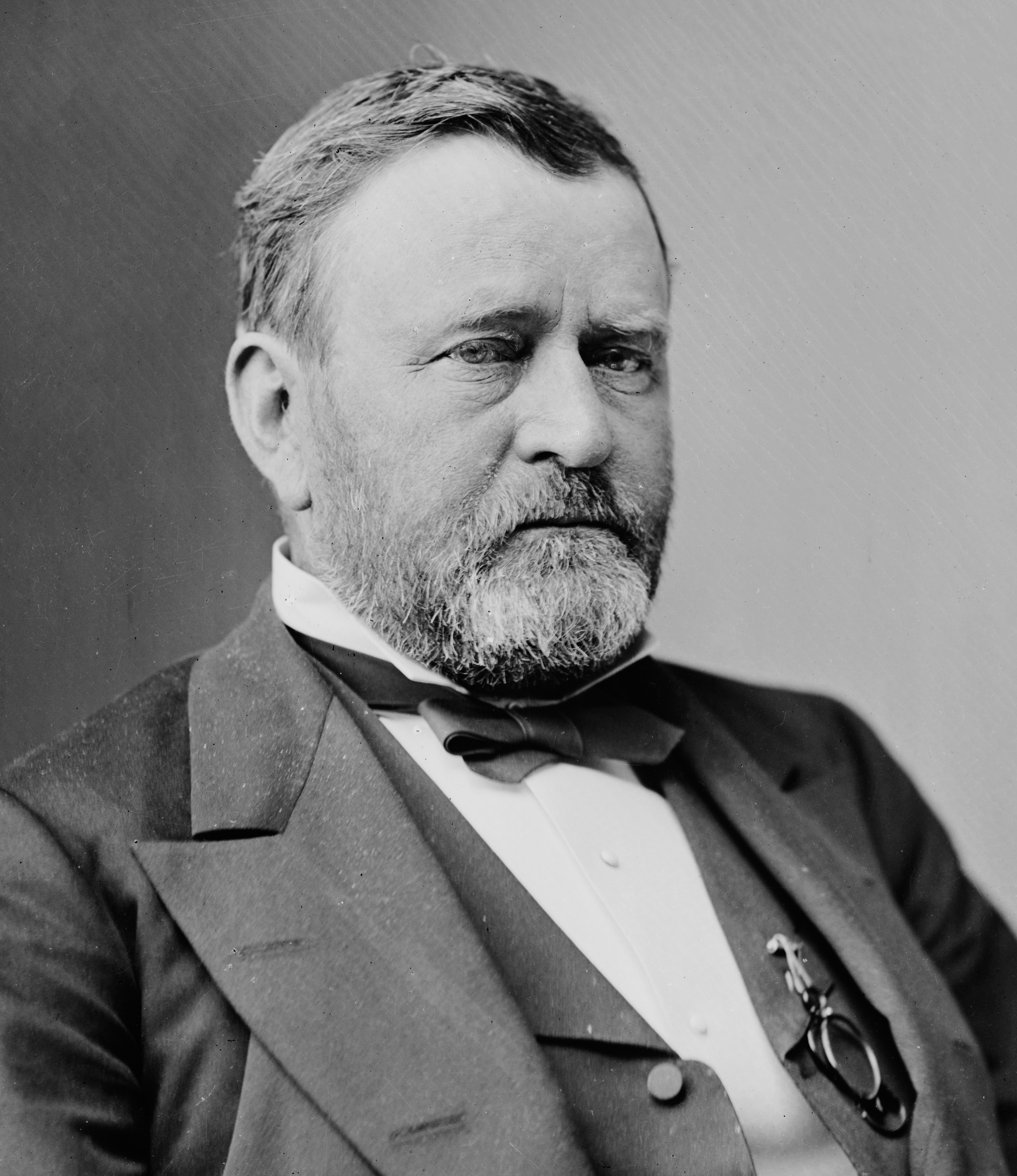

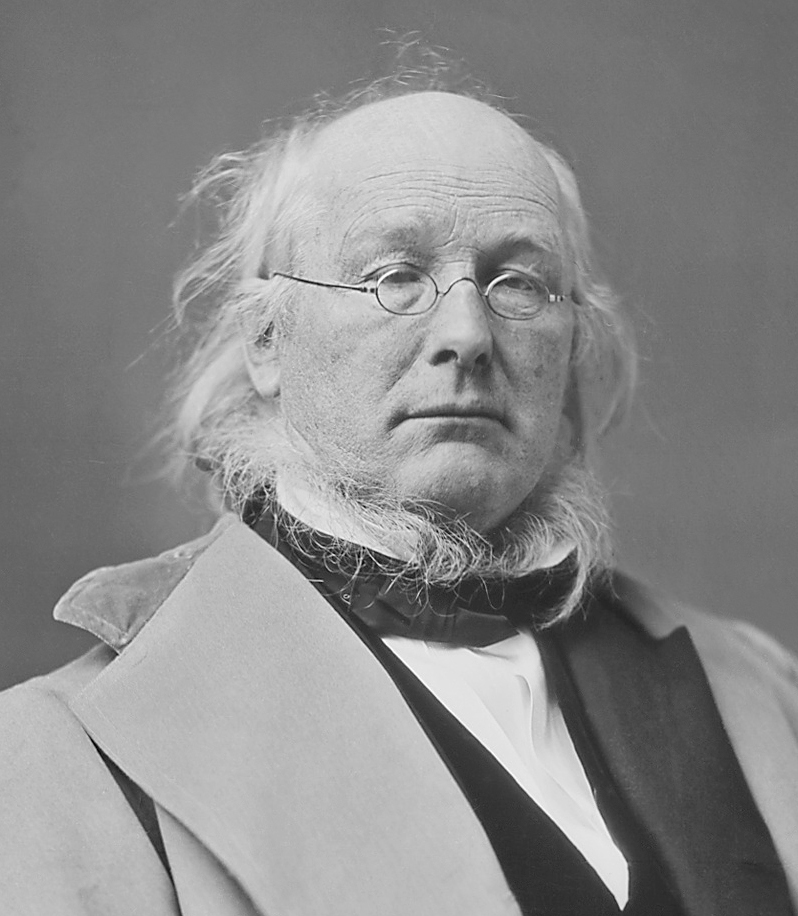
Nominee	Ulysses S. Grant	Horace Greeley
Party	Republican	Liberal Republican
Home state	Illinois	New York
Running mate	Henry Wilson	Benjamin G. Brown
Electoral vote	9	0
Popular vote	91,656	76,456
Percentage	54.52%	45.48%
County results
Grant
50–60%
60–70%
Greeley
50–60%
President before election
Ulysses S. Grant
Republican
Elected President
Ulysses S. Grant
Republican

The 1872 United States presidential election in New Jersey took place on November 5, 1872. All contemporary 37 states were part of the 1872 United States presidential election. The state voters chose nine electors to the Electoral College, which selected the president and vice president.

New Jersey was won by the Republican nominees, incumbent President Ulysses S. Grant of Illinois and his running mate Senator Henry Wilson of Massachusetts. Grant and Wilson defeated the Liberal Republican and Democratic nominees, former Congressman Horace Greeley of New York and his running mate former Senator and Governor Benjamin Gratz Brown of Missouri by a margin of 9.04%.

This was the first time the Republicans won all the electoral votes of New Jersey, (see 1860 election in New Jersey for more information) as well as the popular vote. They would not win either again until 1896, 24 years later.

== Results ==
1872 United States presidential election in New Jersey
Party	Candidate	Running mate	Popular vote		Electoral vote	
Party	Candidate	Running mate	Count	%	Count	%
Republican	Ulysses S. Grant of Illinois	Henry Wilson of Massachusetts	91,656	54.52%	9	100.00%
Liberal Republican	Horace Greeley of New York	Benjamin Gratz Brown of Missouri	76,456	45.48%	0	0.00%
Total			168,112	100.00%	9	100.00%

== See also ==
- United States presidential elections in New Jersey
