= 1864 United States presidential election in New Jersey =

- November 8, 1864
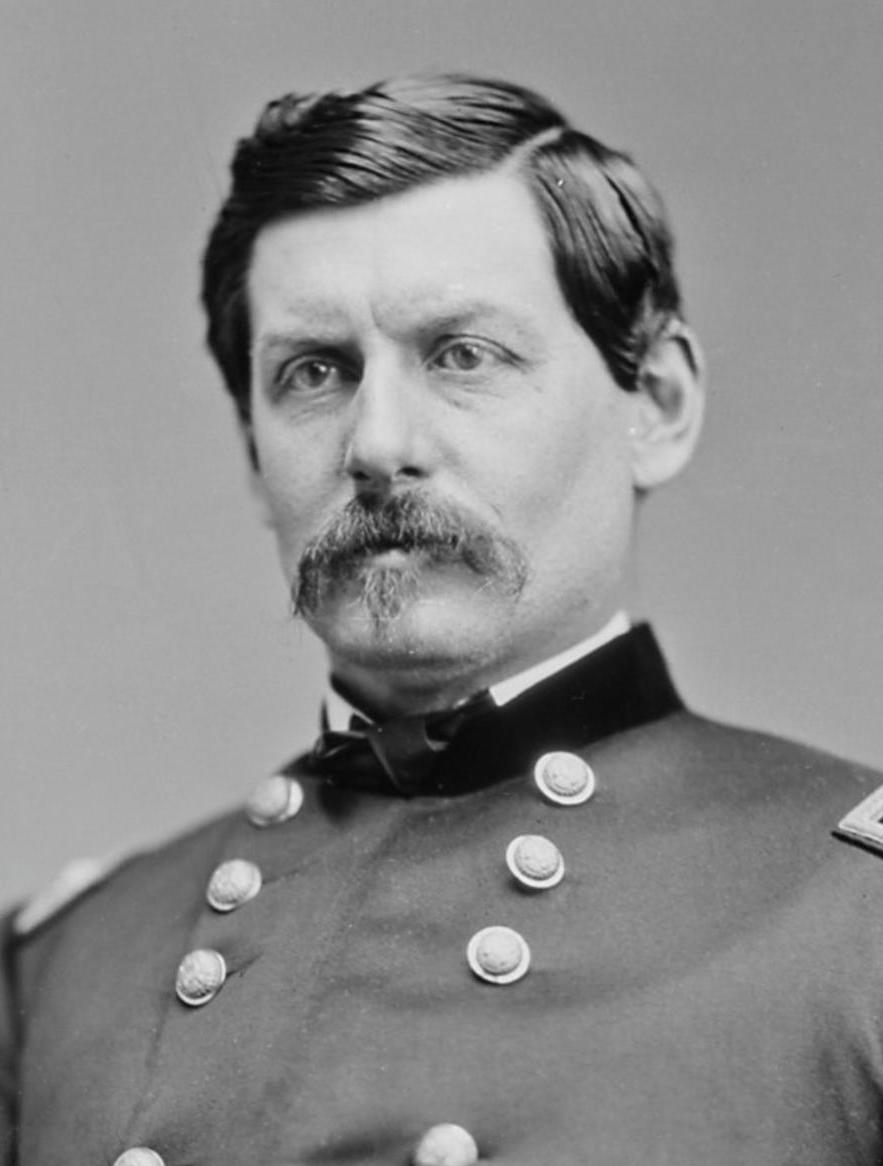

Nominee	George B. McClellan	Abraham Lincoln
Party	Democratic	National Union
Home state	New Jersey	Illinois
Running mate	George H. Pendleton	Andrew Johnson
Electoral vote	7	0
Popular vote	68,024	60,723
Percentage	52.84%	47.16%
County results
McClellan
50–60%
60–70%
Lincoln
50–60%
60–70%
President before election
Abraham Lincoln
Republican
Elected President
Abraham Lincoln
National Union

The 1864 United States presidential election in New Jersey took place on November 8, 1864, as part of the 1864 United States presidential election. Voters chose seven representatives, or electors to the Electoral College, who voted for president and vice president.

New Jersey voted for the Democratic candidate, George B. McClellan, over the National Union candidate, incumbent president Abraham Lincoln. McClellan won his home state by a narrow margin of 5.68%. New Jersey was one of the three states McClellan won, with the other two being Delaware and Kentucky.

With 52.84% of the popular vote, New Jersey would prove to be McClellan's second strongest after Kentucky.

== Results ==
1864 United States presidential election in New Jersey
Party	Candidate	Votes	Percentage	Electoral votes
Democratic	George B. McClellan	68,024	52.84%	7
National Union	Abraham Lincoln (incumbent)	60,723	47.16%	0
Totals		128,747	100.0%	7

== See also ==
- United States presidential elections in New Jersey
