= 1896 United States presidential election in New Jersey =

- November 3, 1896

Nominee	William McKinley	William Jennings Bryan
Party	Republican	Democratic
Home state	Ohio	Nebraska
Running mate	Garret Hobart	Arthur Sewall
Electoral vote	10	0
Popular vote	221,535	133,695
Percentage	59.68%	36.02%
County results
McKinley
40–50%
50–60%
60–70%
70–80%
Bryan
50–60%
President before election
Grover Cleveland
Democratic
Elected President
William McKinley
Republican

The 1896 United States presidential election in New Jersey took place on November 3, 1896. Voters chose 10 representatives, or electors to the Electoral College, who voted for president and vice president.

New Jersey voted for the Republican nominee, former governor of Ohio William McKinley, over the Democratic nominee, former U.S. Representative from Nebraska William Jennings Bryan. McKinley won the state by a margin of 23.66%, making him the first Republican presidential candidate since Ulysses S. Grant in 1872 to carry the state. Bryan, running on a platform of free silver, appealed strongly to Western miners and farmers in the 1896 election, but had little appeal in Northeastern states like New Jersey.

This was a realigning election for New Jersey, as it was for the nation. From 1852 to 1892, the Democrats had carried the state all but once – in Ulysses S. Grant's 1872 landslide – and only in 1860 had any other candidates won any electoral votes at all. New Jersey, as an industrial Mid-Atlantic state, was strongly in favor of the gold standard. Up until 1896, the Democrats had nominated candidates favorable to that notion, and to the state at large. In the ten elections between 1852 and 1892, the Democrats nominated a New Yorker in six (Horatio Seymour in 1868, Horace Greeley in 1872, Samuel J. Tilden in 1876, and Grover Cleveland in 1884, 1888, and 1892). In another three, a candidate from another Mid-Atlantic state was nominated by the Democrats: James Buchanan and Winfield Hancock of Pennsylvania in 1856 and 1880, and New Jersey's own George McClellan in 1864. The only exception occurred in 1860 when the Democrats were completely split between Breckinridge and Douglas.

Beginning in 1896, the Democratic party dramatically shifted away from supporting business interests to supporting the interests of farmers and miners of the south and west. As the issue of bimetallism – whether to allow silver to be used as currency in addition to gold – split the country along regional boundaries, New Jersey went with the pro-gold standard and pro-business Republicans. In the ensuing "System of 1896" that lasted until the Great Depression realignment of 1932, Republicans won the state in all but one election: when New Jersey's own governor, Woodrow Wilson, was the Democratic nominee in 1912. Even then, Wilson was barely able to overcome New Jersey's Republican lean, winning with a tiny plurality of 41.20 percent of the vote due to the Republican split between Progressive Teddy Roosevelt and conservative William Howard Taft.

Beyond even the 4th party system, New Jersey retained the Republican bent it acquired in 1896 for the next century: in the twentieth century, Democrats only won New Jersey nine times, while Republicans won sixteen times. On all but three of these occasions (the Democratic landslides of 1936, 1964, and 1996) the margin of victory was less than 10 points. Even Franklin Roosevelt only barely won the state in 1932, 1940, and 1944. Beginning with Bill Clinton's massive victory in 1996, the state would return to the Democratic fold with the rest of the Northeast during the twenty-first century. Bryan would lose New Jersey to McKinley again four years later and would later lose the state again in 1908 to William Howard Taft.

== Results ==
1896 United States presidential election in New Jersey
Party	Candidate	Running mate	Popular vote		Electoral vote	
Party	Candidate	Running mate	Count	%	Count	%
Republican	William McKinley of Ohio	Garret Hobart of New Jersey	221,535	59.68%	10	100.00%
Democratic	William Jennings Bryan of Nebraska	Arthur Sewall of Maine	133,695	36.02%	0	0.00%
National Democratic	John M. Palmer of Illinois	Simon Bolivar Buckner of Kentucky	6,378	1.72%	0	0.00%
Prohibition	Charles Eugene Bentley of Nebraska	James H. Southgate of North Carolina	5,617	1.51%	0	0.00%
Socialist Labor	Charles H. Matchett of New York	Matthew Maguire of New Jersey	3,986	1.07%	0	0.00%
Total			371,211	100.00%	10	100.00%

=== Results by county ===
County	William McKinley Republican		William Jennings Bryan Democratic		John McAuley Palmer National Democratic		Various candidates Other parties		Margin		Total votes cast
County	#	%	#	%	#	%	#	%	#	%	Total votes cast
Atlantic	5,005	66.06%	2,233	29.47%	119	1.57%	219	2.89%	2,772	36.59%	7,576
Bergen	8,545	62.07%	4,531	32.91%	451	3.28%	239	1.74%	4,014	29.16%	13,766
Burlington	9,371	63.70%	4,610	31.33%	406	2.76%	325	2.21%	4,761	32.36%	14,712
Camden	16,395	69.64%	6,380	27.10%	280	1.19%	487	2.07%	10,015	42.54%	23,542
Cape May	2,136	65.48%	929	28.48%	50	1.53%	147	4.51%	1,207	37.00%	3,262
Cumberland	7,018	61.09%	3,877	33.75%	78	0.68%	515	4.48%	3,141	27.34%	11,488
Essex	42,587	64.99%	20,509	31.30%	1,004	1.53%	1,425	2.17%	22,078	33.69%	65,525
Gloucester	4,727	59.02%	2,981	37.22%	77	0.96%	224	2.80%	1,746	21.80%	8,009
Hudson	33,626	52.51%	28,133	43.94%	927	1.45%	1,347	2.10%	5,493	8.58%	64,033
Hunterdon	4,264	44.20%	4,992	51.75%	93	0.96%	297	3.08%	-728	-7.55%	9,646
Mercer	13,847	66.84%	5,970	28.82%	430	2.08%	471	2.27%	7,877	38.02%	20,718
Middlesex	9,304	58.73%	5,976	37.72%	350	2.21%	213	1.34%	3,328	21.01%	15,843
Monmouth	10,611	55.27%	7,799	40.63%	474	2.47%	313	1.63%	2,812	14.65%	19,197
Morris	8,190	58.71%	4,936	35.38%	331	2.37%	494	3.54%	3,254	23.32%	13,951
Ocean	3,384	72.59%	1,068	22.91%	80	1.72%	130	2.79%	2,316	49.68%	4,662
Passaic	15,437	58.81%	9,280	35.36%	357	1.36%	1,173	4.47%	6,157	23.46%	26,247
Salem	3,717	54.37%	2,802	40.99%	67	0.98%	250	3.66%	915	13.39%	6,836
Somerset	4,388	60.18%	2,608	35.77%	159	2.18%	136	1.87%	1,780	24.41%	7,291
Sussex	3,045	49.09%	2,975	47.96%	49	0.79%	134	2.16%	70	1.13%	6,203
Union	11,707	61.58%	6,073	31.95%	529	2.78%	701	3.69%	5,634	29.64%	19,010
Warren	4,063	42.78%	5,013	52.79%	62	0.65%	359	3.78%	-950	-10.00%	9,497
Totals	221,367	59.67%	133,675	36.03%	6,373	1.72%	9,599	2.59%	87,692	23.64%	371,014

== See also ==
- United States presidential elections in New Jersey
