= 1928 United States presidential election in New Jersey =

- November 6, 1928
- Turnout: 87.32% ▲

Nominee	Herbert Hoover	Al Smith
Party	Republican	Democratic
Home state	California	New York
Running mate	Charles Curtis	Joseph T. Robinson
Electoral vote	14	0
Popular vote	926,050	616,517
Percentage	59.77%	39.79%
County results
Hoover
50–60%
60–70%
70–80%
80–90%
Smith
60–70%
President before election
Calvin Coolidge
Republican
Elected President
Herbert Hoover
Republican

The 1928 United States presidential election in New Jersey took place on November 6, 1928. All contemporary 48 states were part of the 1928 United States presidential election. Voters chose 14 electors to the Electoral College, which selected the president and vice president.

New Jersey was won by the Republican nominees, former Secretary of Commerce Herbert Hoover of California and his running mate Senate Majority Leader Charles Curtis of Kansas. Hoover and Curtis defeated the Democratic nominees, Governor Alfred E. Smith of New York and his running mate Senator Joseph Taylor Robinson of Arkansas.

Hoover carried New Jersey with 59.77 percent of the vote to Smith's 39.79 percent, a victory margin of 19.98 percentage points. Finishing in a distant third was the Socialist Party candidate Norman Thomas, with only 0.32 percent.

New Jersey in this era was a staunchly Republican state, having not given a majority of the vote to a Democratic presidential candidate since 1892. As Herbert Hoover was winning a third consecutive nationwide Republican landslide amidst the economic boom and social good feelings of the Roaring Twenties under popular Republican leadership, New Jersey easily remained in the Republican column.

However Smith for his part did make dramatic gains for the Democratic Party in New Jersey, laying the groundwork for ultimately turning the state Democratic just four years later in 1932. In 1920, Republican Warren G. Harding had carried the state over Democrat James M. Cox by a massive 68–28 margin. In 1924, southern Democrat John W. Davis had received only 27 percent of the vote in the state to Republican Calvin Coolidge's 62 percent. Even as Hoover won a third nationwide Republican landslide, New Jersey swung 15 points toward the Democrats over the previous 1920s GOP performances in the state, with Smith taking nearly 40 percent of the statewide vote.

On the county level map, reflecting the decisiveness of his victory, Hoover won 20 of the state's 21 counties. Despite losing ground overall at the state level, Hoover made gains in the western parts of the state where the reaction to Catholicism was hostility. His strongest county win was in rural Salem County by the Delaware border, where he broke 80% of the vote, a dramatic improvement over the sixty percent vote shares won in that county by Republicans in 1920 and 1924.

However, Al Smith, a New York City native, and Roman Catholic of Irish, Italian and German immigrant heritage, appealed greatly to urban areas populated by ethnic immigrant communities, laying the groundwork for a new urban Democratic coalition. Urban parts of New Jersey, particularly in North Jersey which shared close ties with New York City, swung in Smith's favor. Essex County, home to Newark, swung Democratic, as did Middlesex, Passaic, Union, Bergen, and Mercer counties.

Nevertheless, by far the greatest Democratic swing occurred in heavily populated Hudson County, part of the New York City metro area, and populated by many urban ethnic Catholic immigrant communities. Despite losing every other county in the state, Al Smith won Hudson County with a commanding majority of more than 60% of the vote. This mirrored the results in the nearby 5 boroughs of New York City right across the Hudson River, all of which swung from voting Republican in 1920 and 1924 to voting decisively Democratic in 1928.

While New Jersey remained Republican in 1928, its overall trend was Democratic, going from being 13% more Republican than the nation in 1920 to 10% more Republican than the nation in 1924 to only 2.56% more Republican than the nation in 1928, foreshadowing New Jersey's political future as being a closely divided swing state with only a slight Republican lean for much of the 20th century until New Jersey ultimately became a solidly Democratic state in the 1990s.

== Results ==
1928 United States presidential election in New Jersey
Party	Candidate	Votes	Percentage	Electoral votes
Republican	Herbert Hoover	926,050	59.77%	14
Democratic	Alfred E. Smith	616,517	39.79%	0
Socialist	Norman Thomas	4,897	0.32%	0
Workers	William Z. Foster	1,257	0.08%	0
Socialist Labor	Verne L. Reynolds	500	0.03%	0
National Prohibition	William Varney	160	0.01%	0
Totals		1,549,381	100.0%	14

=== Results by county ===
County	Herbert Hoover Republican		Al Smith Democratic		Norman M. Thomas Socialist		William Z. Foster Workers		Various candidates Other parties		Margin		Total votes cast
County	#	%	#	%	#	%	#	%	#	%	#	%	Total votes cast
Atlantic	37,238	65.95%	19,152	33.92%	47	0.08%	18	0.03%	10	0.02%	18,086	32.03%	56,465
Bergen	89,105	63.62%	50,373	35.96%	443	0.32%	89	0.06%	57	0.04%	38,732	27.65%	140,067
Burlington	30,224	73.19%	10,972	26.57%	65	0.16%	14	0.03%	19	0.05%	19,252	46.62%	41,294
Camden	75,517	69.78%	32,151	29.71%	473	0.44%	10	0.01%	77	0.07%	43,366	40.07%	108,228
Cape May	12,207	76.40%	3,731	23.35%	29	0.18%	4	0.03%	7	0.04%	8,476	53.05%	15,978
Cumberland	23,921	77.92%	6,694	21.81%	54	0.18%	11	0.04%	19	0.06%	17,227	56.12%	30,699
Essex	168,856	58.53%	118,268	40.99%	1,080	0.37%	237	0.08%	73	0.03%	50,588	17.53%	288,514
Gloucester	25,627	79.34%	6,594	20.41%	57	0.18%	3	0.01%	21	0.07%	19,033	58.92%	32,302
Hudson	99,972	39.35%	153,009	60.22%	829	0.33%	199	0.08%	62	0.02%	-53,037	-20.87%	254,071
Hunterdon	11,820	73.53%	4,225	26.28%	11	0.07%	9	0.06%	11	0.07%	7,595	47.24%	16,076
Mercer	41,056	59.21%	27,908	40.25%	231	0.33%	95	0.14%	48	0.07%	13,148	18.96%	69,338
Middlesex	38,714	52.35%	34,908	47.20%	187	0.25%	116	0.16%	25	0.03%	3,806	5.15%	73,950
Monmouth	47,046	65.84%	24,286	33.99%	82	0.11%	13	0.02%	27	0.04%	22,760	31.85%	71,454
Morris	33,189	68.35%	15,188	31.28%	145	0.30%	13	0.03%	24	0.05%	18,001	37.07%	48,559
Ocean	12,301	73.19%	4,452	26.49%	42	0.25%	8	0.05%	4	0.02%	7,849	46.70%	16,807
Passaic	57,708	54.53%	47,167	44.57%	656	0.62%	216	0.20%	87	0.08%	10,541	9.96%	105,834
Salem	12,323	80.23%	3,001	19.54%	22	0.14%	1	0.01%	13	0.08%	9,322	60.69%	15,360
Somerset	16,386	66.66%	8,120	33.03%	52	0.21%	15	0.06%	7	0.03%	8,266	33.63%	24,580
Sussex	8,964	74.50%	3,043	25.29%	17	0.14%	2	0.02%	6	0.05%	5,921	49.21%	12,032
Union	68,119	64.21%	37,476	35.32%	309	0.29%	161	0.15%	27	0.03%	30,643	28.88%	106,092
Warren	14,992	73.15%	5,444	26.56%	35	0.17%	10	0.05%	14	0.07%	9,548	46.59%	20,495
Totals	925,285	59.88%	616,162	39.88%	4,866	0.31%	1,244	0.08%	638	0.04%	309,123	20.01%	1,545,195

== See also ==
- Presidency of Herbert Hoover
- United States presidential elections in New Jersey
