= 1948 United States presidential election in New Jersey =

- November 2, 1948
- Turnout: 83.02% (▼0.05%)
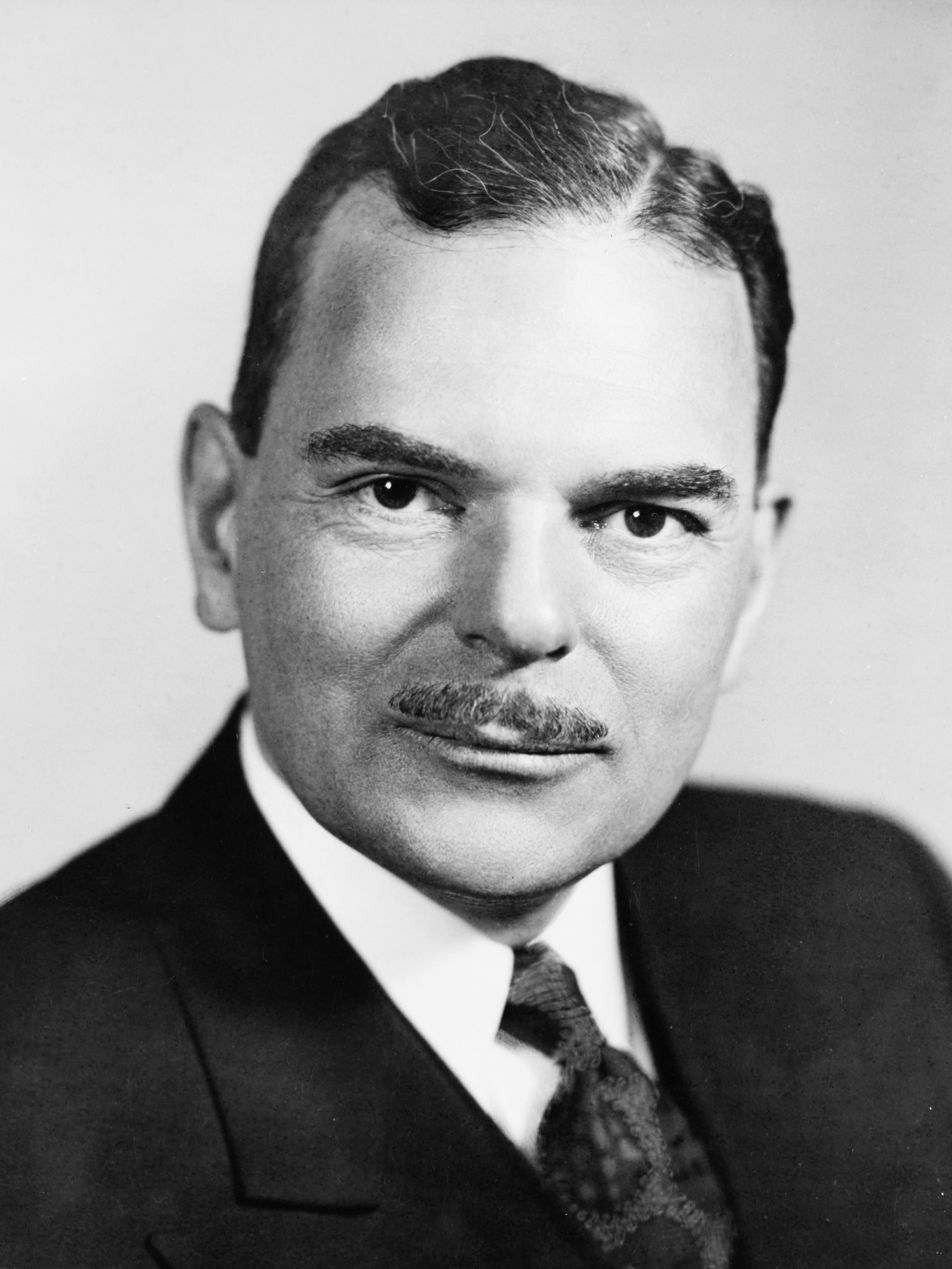

Nominee	Thomas E. Dewey	Harry S. Truman
Party	Republican	Democratic
Home state	New York	Missouri
Running mate	Earl Warren	Alben W. Barkley
Electoral vote	16	0
Popular vote	981,124	895,455
Percentage	50.33%	45.93%
County results
Dewey
40–50%
50–60%
60–70%
70–80%
Truman
40–50%
50–60%
60–70%
President before election
Harry S. Truman
Democratic
Elected President
Harry S. Truman
Democratic

The 1948 United States presidential election in New Jersey took place on November 2, 1948. All contemporary 48 states were part of the 1948 United States presidential election. Voters chose 16 electors to the Electoral College, which selected the president and vice president.

New Jersey was won by the Republican nominees, former Governor Thomas E. Dewey of New York and his running mate Governor Earl Warren of California. Dewey and Warren defeated the Democratic nominees, incumbent President Harry S. Truman of Missouri and his running mate Senator Alben W. Barkley of Kentucky. Also in the running was the Progressive Party candidate, former Democratic Vice President Henry A. Wallace, who ran with former Senator Glen H. Taylor of Idaho.

Dewey carried New Jersey with 50.33% of the vote to Truman's 45.93%, a margin of 4.39%. Wallace came in a distant third, with 2.19%.

Despite the closeness of the statewide result, Dewey won 15 of the state's 21 counties, while Truman won 6. However, Truman won several of the most heavily populated urban counties in the state, taking over 60% of the vote in Hudson County, winning majorities in Mercer, Camden, and Middlesex counties, and in rural Salem County, and winning with a plurality in Passaic County. However, Dewey won majorities in several heavily populated counties, including Bergen, Morris, Union, Monmouth, and Ocean counties, and also narrowly winning Essex County with a plurality, along with winning most of the state's Southern and rural counties. Wallace for his part performed most strongly in North Jersey, particularly in Essex, Union, and Passaic Counties.

New Jersey in this era was usually a swing state with a Republican lean, and its results in 1948 adhered to that pattern. As Truman narrowly defeated Dewey nationally in an upset victory, Dewey's narrow victory in New Jersey made the state almost 9% more Republican than the national average. Republicans won Burlington, Atlantic, Gloucester, and Cumberland counties for the first time since 1932. This is the last time Democrats won the presidency without Essex County. This is the second of 3 times that New Jersey voted for the loser of the presidential election in the 20th century, the other times being 1916 and 1976.

== Primary election ==
1948 New Jersey unofficial presidential primary
- April 20, 1948
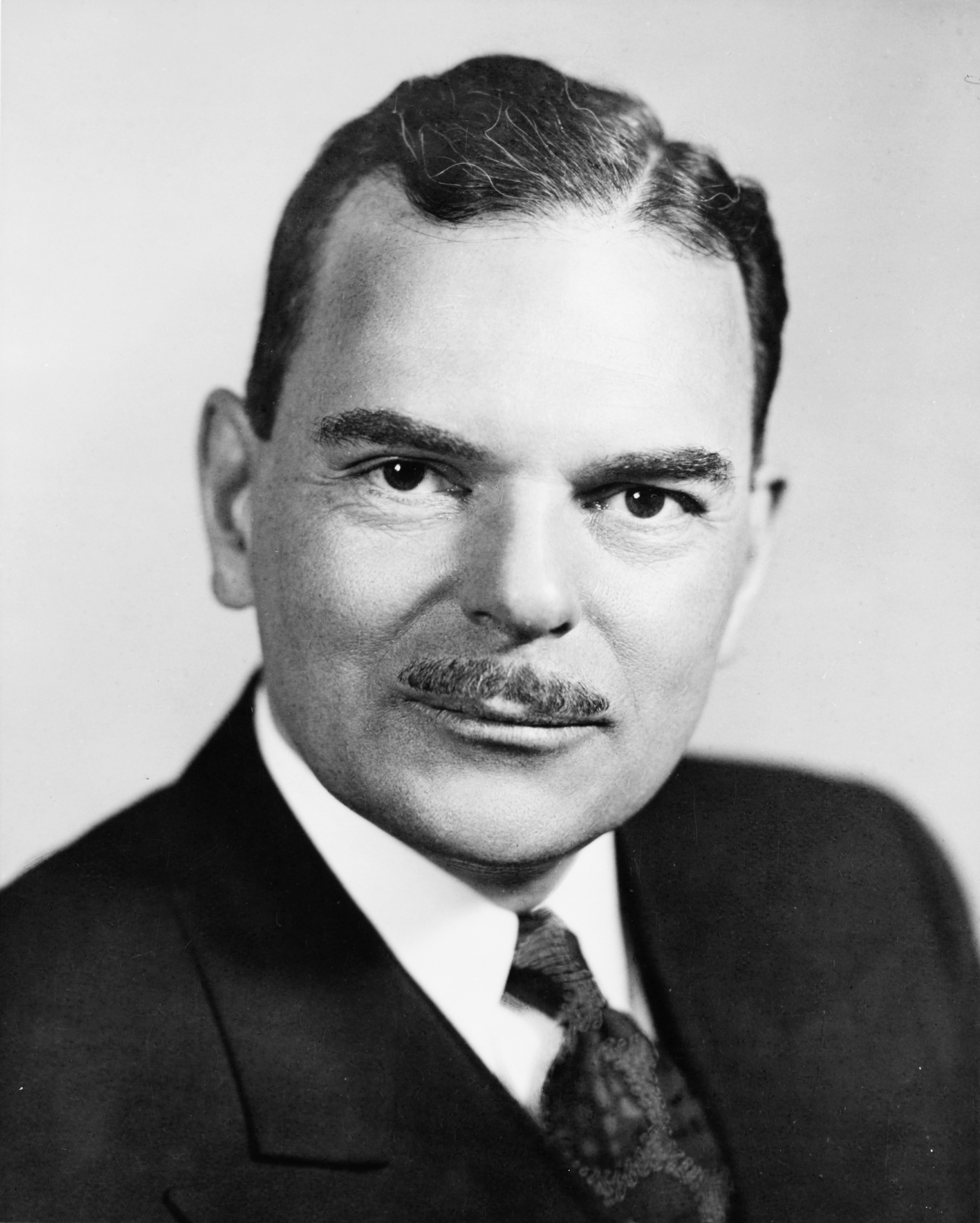

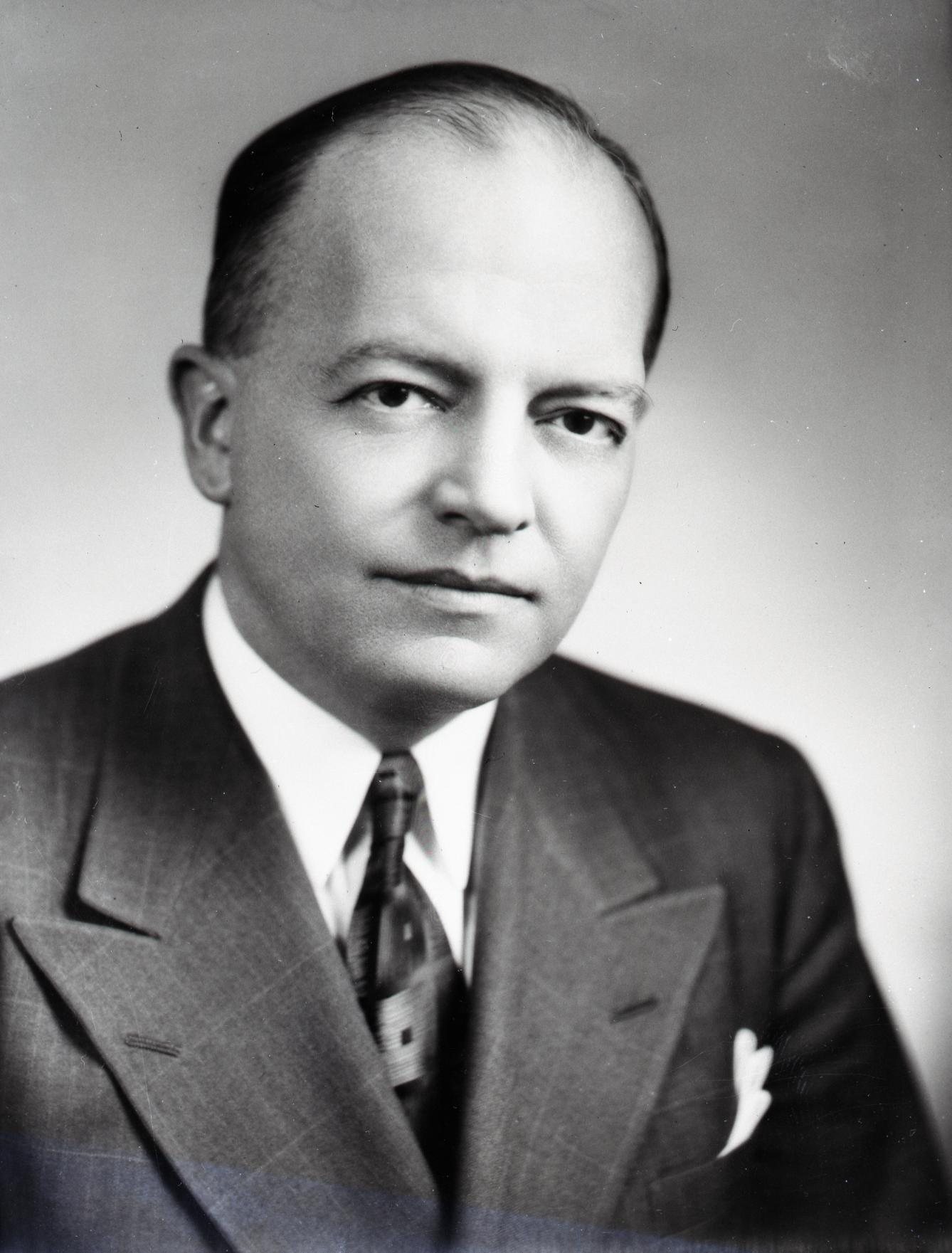

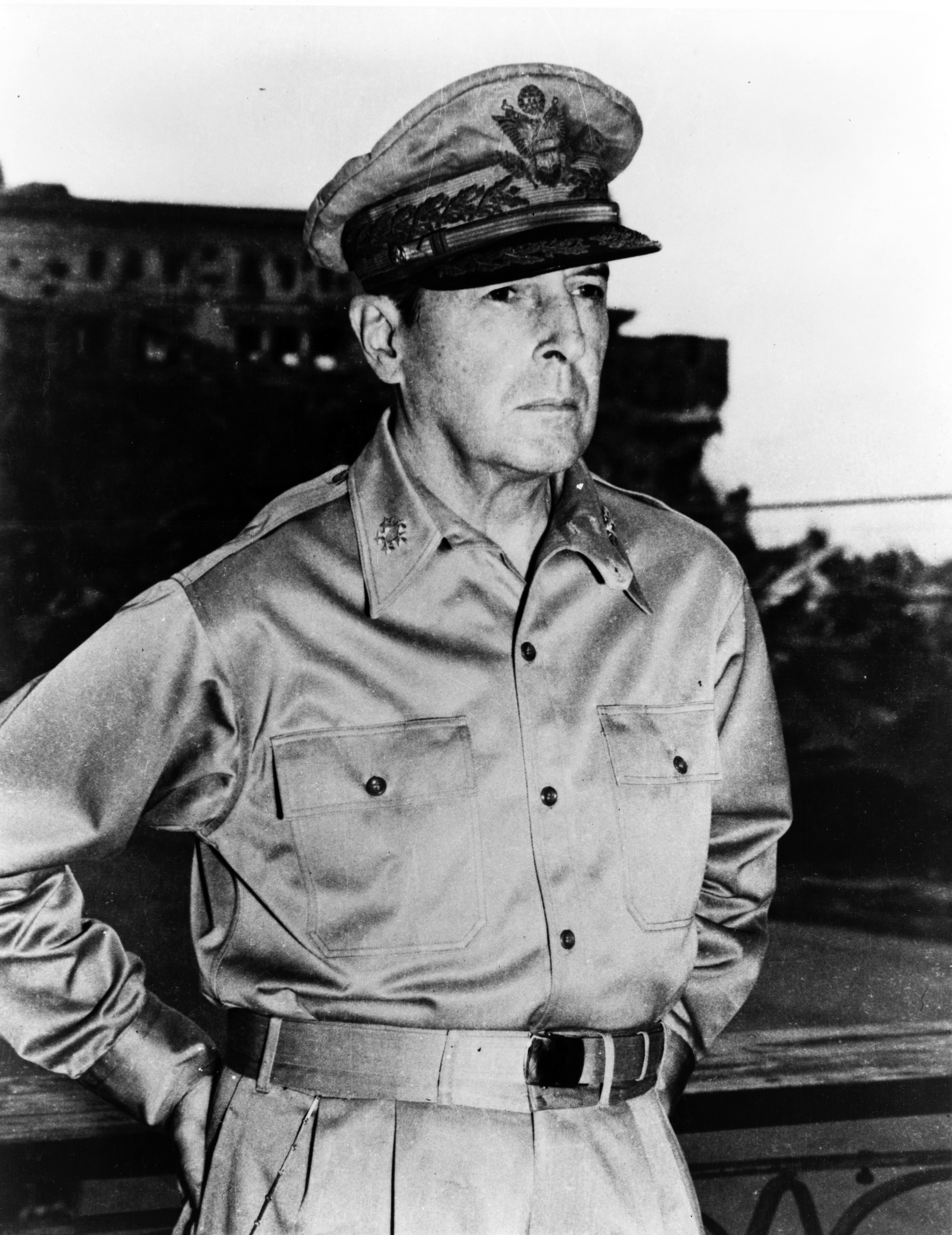

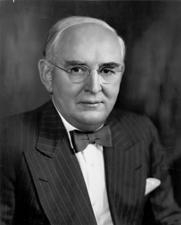
Candidate	Thomas E. Dewey	Harold Stassen	Harry S. Truman
Party	Republican	Republican	Democratic
Home state	New York	Minnesota	Missouri
Popular vote	3,714	3,129	1,100
Percentage	36.54%	30.72%	10.82%
Candidate	Douglas MacArthur	Arthur Vandenberg
Party	Republican	Republican
Home state	New York	Michigan
Popular vote	718	516
Percentage	7.06%	5.08%

Neither of the major parties held primaries for presidential candidates, but some counties held unofficial nonpartisan primaries. The sums of such elections are shown below. Most votes were Republican candidates, with Thomas E. Dewey and Harold Stassen as the top candidates.

Unofficial primary results
Party	Candidate	Votes	%
Republican	Thomas E. Dewey	3,714	36.54
Republican	Harold Stassen	3,123	30.72
Democratic	Harry S. Truman	1,100	10.82
Republican	Douglas MacArthur	718	7.06
Republican	Arthur Vandenberg	516	5.08
Republican	Robert A. Taft	495	4.87
Independent	Dwight D. Eisenhower	288	2.83
Progressive	Henry A. Wallace	87	0.86
Republican	Joseph W. Martin Jr.	64	0.63
Republican	Alfred E. Driscoll	44	0.43
Republican	Earl Warren	14	0.14
Democratic	Elmer H. Wene	1	0.01
Democratic	Justice William O. Douglas	1	0.01
Total votes		10,165	100.0

== Results ==
1948 United States presidential election in New Jersey
Party	Candidate	Votes	Percentage	Electoral votes
Republican	Thomas E. Dewey	981,124	50.33%	16
Democratic	Harry S. Truman (incumbent)	895,455	45.93%	0
Progressive	Henry A. Wallace	42,683	2.19%	0
National Prohibition	Claude A. Watson	10,593	0.54%	0
Socialist	Norman Thomas	10,521	0.54%	0
Socialist Workers	Farrell Dobbs	5,825	0.30%	0
Socialist Labor	Edward A. Teichert	3,354	0.17%	0
Totals		1,949,555	100.0%	16

=== Results by county ===
County	Thomas E. Dewey Republican		Harry S. Truman Democratic		Henry A. Wallace Independent Progressive		Claude A. Watson National Prohibition		Norman M. Thomas Socialist		Farrell Dobbs Socialist Workers		Edward A. Teichert Socialist Labor		Margin		Total votes cast
County	#	%	#	%	#	%	#	%	#	%	#	%	#	%	#	%	Total votes cast
Atlantic	31,608	54.43%	25,313	43.59%	995	1.71%	56	0.10%	79	0.14%	8	0.01%	12	0.02%	6,295	10.84%	58,071
Bergen	142,657	65.70%	69,132	31.84%	3,503	1.61%	327	0.15%	1,312	0.60%	82	0.04%	118	0.05%	73,525	33.86%	217,131
Burlington	21,183	49.92%	20,801	49.02%	278	0.66%	41	0.10%	126	0.30%	1	0.00%	2	0.00%	382	0.90%	42,432
Camden	51,977	42.91%	66,388	54.81%	1,886	1.56%	117	0.10%	419	0.35%	313	0.26%	32	0.03%	-14,411	-11.90%	121,132
Cape May	11,227	64.46%	6,031	34.63%	118	0.68%	14	0.08%	20	0.11%	5	0.03%	2	0.01%	5,196	29.83%	17,417
Cumberland	16,556	51.24%	15,195	47.02%	449	1.39%	42	0.13%	46	0.14%	7	0.02%	18	0.06%	1,361	4.21%	32,313
Essex	166,963	48.60%	155,468	45.25%	11,741	3.42%	6,560	1.91%	2,004	0.58%	343	0.10%	488	0.14%	11,495	3.35%	343,567
Gloucester	19,477	54.46%	15,785	44.14%	349	0.98%	47	0.13%	97	0.27%	7	0.02%	3	0.01%	3,692	10.32%	35,765
Hudson	111,113	36.47%	182,979	60.06%	6,049	1.99%	2,920	0.96%	1,146	0.38%	148	0.05%	298	0.10%	-71,866	-23.59%	304,653
Hunterdon	10,654	60.85%	6,515	37.21%	250	1.43%	18	0.10%	61	0.35%	1	0.01%	10	0.06%	4,139	23.64%	17,509
Mercer	37,794	42.26%	49,690	55.56%	1,451	1.62%	31	0.03%	457	0.51%	6	0.01%	7	0.01%	-11,896	-13.30%	89,436
Middlesex	49,810	42.86%	61,634	53.04%	2,649	2.28%	94	0.08%	1,791	1.54%	136	0.12%	96	0.08%	-11,824	-10.17%	116,210
Monmouth	52,908	62.22%	30,507	35.88%	1,343	1.58%	48	0.06%	214	0.25%	5	0.01%	8	0.01%	22,401	26.34%	85,033
Morris	42,558	68.01%	18,864	30.15%	746	1.19%	22	0.04%	362	0.58%	4	0.01%	18	0.03%	23,694	37.87%	62,574
Ocean	16,740	70.43%	6,366	26.79%	579	2.44%	6	0.03%	74	0.31%	2	0.01%	0	0.00%	10,374	43.65%	23,767
Passaic	59,675	45.75%	60,147	46.11%	4,870	3.73%	70	0.05%	574	0.44%	4,685	3.59%	409	0.31%	-472	-0.36%	130,430
Salem	8,961	48.65%	9,278	50.37%	127	0.69%	25	0.14%	20	0.11%	2	0.01%	5	0.03%	-317	-1.72%	18,418
Somerset	22,034	59.77%	14,104	38.26%	543	1.47%	13	0.04%	162	0.44%	3	0.01%	3	0.01%	7,930	21.51%	36,862
Sussex	9,269	66.50%	4,527	32.48%	101	0.72%	5	0.04%	34	0.24%	1	0.01%	2	0.01%	4,742	34.02%	13,939
Union	87,402	53.89%	66,759	41.16%	4,514	2.78%	127	0.08%	1,493	0.92%	66	0.04%	1,819	1.12%	20,643	12.73%	162,180
Warren	10,558	50.97%	9,972	48.14%	142	0.69%	10	0.05%	30	0.14%	2	0.01%	2	0.01%	586	2.83%	20,716
Totals	981,124	50.33%	895,455	45.93%	42,683	2.19%	10,593	0.54%	10,521	0.54%	5,825	0.30%	3,354	0.17%	85,669	4.39%	1,949,555

==== Counties that flipped from Democratic to Republican ====
- Atlantic
- Burlington
- Cumberland
- Gloucester

== See also ==
- Presidency of Harry S. Truman
- United States presidential elections in New Jersey
