= 1864 United States presidential election in Kentucky =

- November 8, 1864
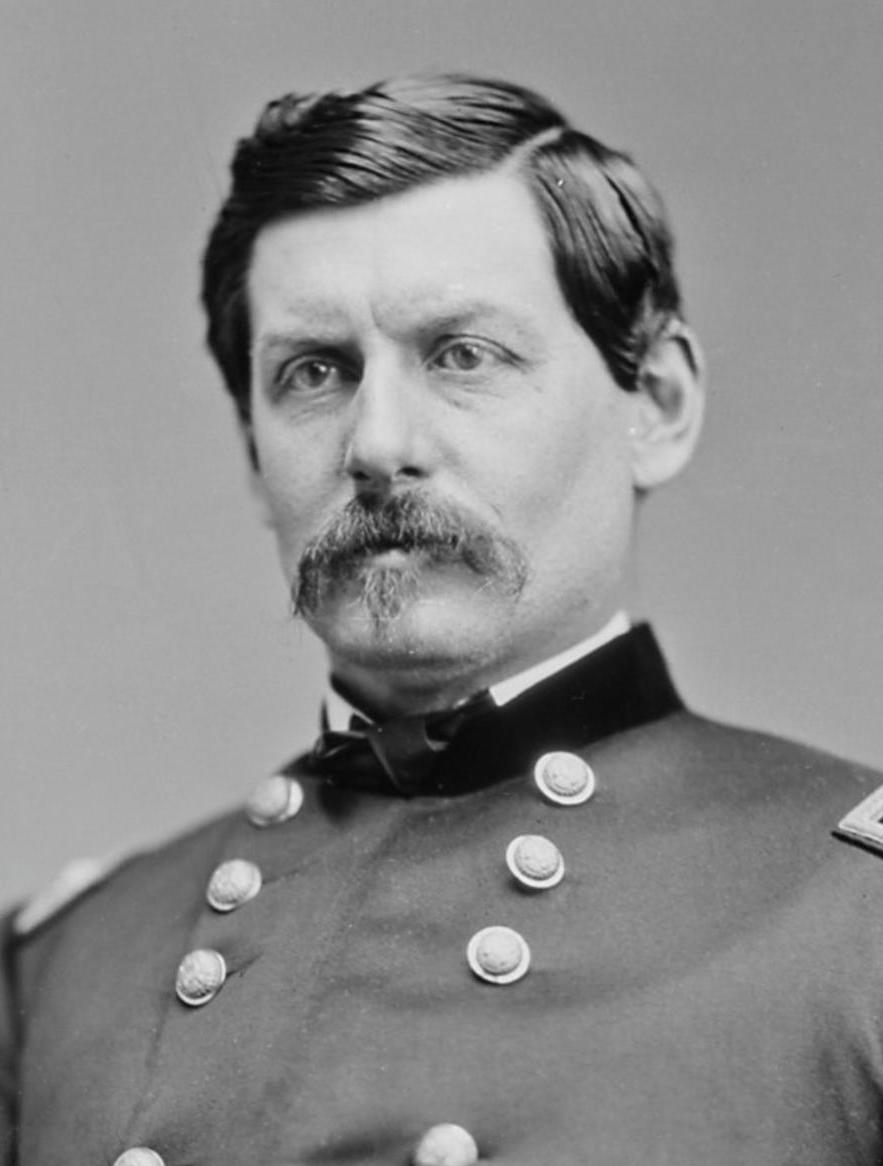

Nominee	George B. McClellan	Abraham Lincoln
Party	Democratic	National Union
Home state	New Jersey	Illinois
Running mate	George H. Pendleton	Andrew Johnson
Electoral vote	11	0
Popular vote	64,301	27,787
Percentage	69.83%	30.17%
County results
McClellan
50–60%
60–70%
70–80%
80–90%
90–100%
Lincoln
50–60%
60–70%
70–80%
80–90%
90–100%
No returns
President before election
Abraham Lincoln
Republican
Elected President
Abraham Lincoln
National Union

The 1864 United States presidential election in Kentucky took place on November 8, 1864, as part of the 1864 United States presidential election. State voters chose 11 representatives, or electors, to the Electoral College, who voted for president and vice president.

Kentucky being captured by the Union and driving out the Confederacy early in the war was won by the Democratic candidate, 4th Commanding General of the United States Army George B. McClellan of New Jersey and his running mate Representative George H. Pendleton of Ohio. They defeated the National Union candidate, incumbent Republican President Abraham Lincoln of Illinois and his running mate former Senator and Military Governor of Tennessee Andrew Johnson. McClellan won the state in a landslide, by a margin of 39.64%.

Despite having been born and raised for the first five years of his life in the state, Kentucky would end up being Lincoln's weakest state and McClellan's strongest state. In addition, Kentucky was the only state that McClellan won by more than 6%. As of the 2024 presidential election, this is the last occasion when Butler County and Monroe County voted for a Democratic presidential candidate.

== Results ==
1864 United States presidential election in Kentucky
Party	Candidate	Votes	%
Democratic	George B. McClellan	64,301	69.83%
National Union	Abraham Lincoln (incumbent)	27,787	30.17%
Total votes		92,088	100%

== See also ==
- United States presidential elections in Kentucky
