= McCutcheon =

McCutcheon may refer to:

== People ==
- Allan L. McCutcheon (1950–2016), American sociologist and statistician
- Andrew McCutcheon (1931–2017), Australian politician and Attorney-General of Victoria
- Bill McCutcheon (1924–2002), American actor
- Brian McCutcheon (politician) (born 1967), Progressive Conservative Party candidate in the 1997 Canadian federal election
- Brian McCutcheon (ice hockey) (born 1949), Canadian ice hockey player
- Darwin McCutcheon (born 1962), Canadian ice hockey defenceman
- Daylon McCutcheon (born 1976), American college football player, son of Lawrence McCutcheon
- Gary McCutcheon (born 1978), Scottish footballer
- George Barr McCutcheon (1866–1928), playwright
- Gillian McCutcheon, British actress
- Hugh McCutcheon, volleyball coach
- Ian McCutcheon (born 1959), American neurosurgeon
- John McCutcheon (born 1952), American folk singer
- John McCutcheon (New Jersey politician) (1879–1942), New Jersey State Comptroller
- John T. McCutcheon (1870–1949), American political cartoonist
- Keith B. McCutcheon (1915–1971), U.S. Marine Corps aviator and general
- Lance McCutcheon (born 1999), American football player
- Lawrence McCutcheon (born 1950), American football player
- Mac McCutcheon (Canadian politician) (1912–1978), Canadian politician and farmer
- Mac McCutcheon (Alabama politician), member of the Alabama House of Representatives
- Malcolm Wallace McCutcheon known as "Wallace" (1906–1969), a Canadian politician
- Mark McCutcheon (born 1984), American ice hockey player
- Martine McCutcheon (born 1976), English actress and singer
- Pat McCutcheon (born 1987), Australian rugby union footballer
- Robert McCutcheon (1841–1918), Australian politician
- Rodney McCutcheon (born 1962), Irish bowler
- Russell T. McCutcheon (born 1961), Canadian scholar
- Sandy McCutcheon, Australian author
- Shaun McCutcheon, American businessman and Republican activist, plaintiff of McCutcheon v. FEC
- Shaw McCutcheon (1921–2016), American cartoonist
- Stanley McCutcheon (1917–1975), American politician
- Stuart McCutcheon (c. 1955–2023), New Zealand university administrator
- Wallace McCutcheon, Sr. (1858 or 1862–1918), American pioneer cinematographer and director
- William McCutcheon (1870–1949), Wales international rugby player
- William W. McCutcheon (1926–2020), American police chief and politician

== Fictional characters ==
- Shane McCutcheon, fictional character on The L Word
- Admiral McCutcheon, fictional character in the 1997 television remake of 20,000 Leagues Under the Sea

== Places ==
United States

- McCutcheon, Mississippi
- McCutcheon High School in Lafayette, Indiana

== See also ==
- McCutcheon v. Federal Election Commission
- McCutcheon index measure of bacteria
- Multiple Access Ltd. v. McCutcheon, a lawsuit
- A variation of the French Defence opening, in chess
- McCutchen a similarly spelled surname
- McCutchan
- MacCutchen, a fictional brand of scotch whiskey, featured in the series Lost, and Once Upon a Time.
