= Wanaque Borough Schools =

School district in Passaic County, New Jersey, US

Address
- 973A Ringwood Avenue Haskell, Passaic County, New Jersey, 07420; United States
- Coordinates: 41.033775°N 74.295403°W

District information
- Grades: PreK-8
- Superintendent: Matthew Murphy
- Business administrator: Nancy DiBartolo
- Schools: 2

Students and staff
- Enrollment: 894 (as of 2024–25)
- Faculty: 89.90 FTEs
- Student–teacher ratio: 9.94:1

Other information
- District Factor Group: DE
- Website: www.wanaqueps.org
Ind.	Per pupil	District spending	Rank (*)	K-8 average	%± vs. average
1A	Total Spending	$19,027	71	$18,891	0.7%
1	Budgetary Cost	14,752	56	14,159	4.2%
2	Classroom Instruction	9,841	77	8,659	13.7%
6	Support Services	1,974	37	2,167	−8.9%
8	Administrative Cost	1,534	39	1,547	−0.8%
10	Operations & Maintenance	1,283	18	1,612	−20.4%
13	Extracurricular Activities	99	46	104	−4.8%
16	Median Teacher Salary	62,395	51	61,136
Data from NJDoE 2014 Taxpayers' Guide to Education Spending. *Of K-8 districts with more than 750 students. Lowest spending=1; Highest=84

The Wanaque Borough Schools is a community public school district that serves students in pre-kindergarten through eighth grade from Wanaque, in Passaic County, in the U.S. state of New Jersey.

As of the 2024–25 school year, the district, comprising two schools, had an enrollment of 894 students and 89.90 classroom teachers (on an FTE basis), for a student–teacher ratio of 9.94:1.

The district is classified by the New Jersey Department of Education as being in District Factor Group "DE", the fifth-highest of eight groupings. District Factor Groups organize districts statewide to allow comparison by common socioeconomic characteristics of the local districts. From lowest socioeconomic status to highest, the categories are A, B, CD, DE, FG, GH, I and J.

Students in public school for ninth through twelfth grades attend Lakeland Regional High School, which serves students from the Boroughs of Ringwood and Wanaque. The high school is located in Wanaque and is part of the Lakeland Regional High School District. As of the 2024–25 school year, the high school had an enrollment of 823 students and 74.70 classroom teachers (on an FTE basis), for a student–teacher ratio of 11.02:1.

== Schools ==
Schools in the district (with 2024–25 enrollment data from the National Center for Education Statistics) are:

Elementary schools

- Haskell Elementary School 382 students in grades PreK–8
  - Brett Biggins, principal
- Wanaque Elementary School 506 students in grades PreK–8
  - Tara Scognamiglio, principal

== Administration ==
Core members of the district's administration are:

- Matthew Murphy, superintendent
- Nancy DiBartolo, business administrator and board secretary

== Board of education ==
The district's board of education, composed of nine members, sets policy and oversees the fiscal and educational operation of the district through its administration. As a Type II school district, the board's trustees are elected directly by voters to serve three-year terms of office on a staggered basis, with three seats up for election each year held (since 2012) as part of the November general election. The board appoints a superintendent to oversee the district's day-to-day operations and a business administrator to supervise the business functions of the district. As of January 2026 the board of education members are:

- Angela Demetriou, President
- Nicholas Bastean, Vice President
- Robert Barnhardt
- Jessica Geyer
- Barry Hain
- Tina Johannemann
- Barry McCloud
- Richard McFarlane
- Leane Tully
