= Ringwood Public School District =

School district in Passaic County, New Jersey, US

Address
- 121 Carletondale Road Ringwood, Passaic County, New Jersey, 07456
- Coordinates: 41.116455°N 74.258839°W

District information
- Grades: K-8
- Superintendent: Kevin Brentnall
- Business administrator: Paul Roth (interim)
- Schools: 4

Students and staff
- Enrollment: 1,019 (as of 2023–24)
- Faculty: 113.7 FTEs
- Student–teacher ratio: 9.0:1

Other information
- District Factor Group: GH
- Website: www.njrps.org
| Ind. | Per pupil | District spending | Rank (*) | K-8 average | %± vs. average |
|---|---|---|---|---|---|
| 1A | Total Spending | $18,516 | 60 | $18,891 | −2.0% |
| 1 | Budgetary Cost | 15,347 | 68 | 14,159 | 8.4% |
| 2 | Classroom Instruction | 9,820 | 76 | 8,659 | 13.4% |
| 6 | Support Services | 2,210 | 52 | 2,167 | 2.0% |
| 8 | Administrative Cost | 1,425 | 28 | 1,547 | −7.9% |
| 10 | Operations & Maintenance | 1,792 | 64 | 1,612 | 11.2% |
| 13 | Extracurricular Activities | 30 | 7 | 104 | −71.2% |
| 16 | Median Teacher Salary | 54,825 | 13 | 61,136 |
Data from NJDoE 2014 Taxpayers' Guide to Education Spending. *Of K-8 districts with more than 750 students. Lowest spending=1; Highest=84

The Ringwood Public School District is a comprehensive community public school district that serves students in kindergarten through eighth grade from Ringwood in Passaic County, in the U.S. state of New Jersey.

As of the 2023–24 school year, the district, comprised of four schools, had an enrollment of 1,019 students and 113.7 classroom teachers (on an FTE basis), for a student–teacher ratio of 9.0:1.

The district had been classified by the New Jersey Department of Education as being in District Factor Group "GH", the third-highest of eight groupings. District Factor Groups organize districts statewide to allow comparison by common socioeconomic characteristics of the local districts. From lowest socioeconomic status to highest, the categories are A, B, CD, DE, FG, GH, I and J.

Students in public school for ninth through twelfth grades attend Lakeland Regional High School in Wanaque, which serves students from the Boroughs of Ringwood and Wanaque. As of the 2023–24 school year, the high school had an enrollment of 847 students and 77.7 classroom teachers (on an FTE basis), for a student–teacher ratio of 10.9:1.

== Schools ==
Schools in the district (with 2023–24 enrollment data from the National Center for Education Statistics) are:

Elementary schools

- Peter Cooper Elementary School with 234 students in grades K–3 (built in 1963)
  - Timothy Johnson, principal
- Robert Erskine Elementary School with 171 students in grades K–3 (built in 1960)
  - Gregg Festa, principal
- Eleanor G. Hewitt Intermediate School with 228 students in grades 4–5 (built in 1937 with an annex built in 1952 and trailers added in 1959)
  - Kevin Brentnall, principal

Middle school

- Martin J. Ryerson Middle School with 370 students in grades 6–8 (built in 1970)
  - David Waxman, principal

== Administration ==
Core members of the district's administration are:

- Kevin Brentnall, superintendent of Schools
- Paul Roth, interim business administrator and board secretary

== Board of education ==
The district's board of education is comprised of nine members who set policy and oversee the fiscal and educational operation of the district through its administration. As a Type II school district, the board's trustees are elected directly by voters to serve three-year terms of office on a staggered basis, with three seats up for election each year held (since 2012) as part of the November general election. The board appoints a superintendent to oversee the district's day-to-day operations and a business administrator to supervise the business functions of the district.
