= Palatucci =

Palatucci is an Italian surname. Notable people with the surname include:

- Bill Palatucci (born 1958), American lawyer and political consultant
- Giovanni Palatucci (1909–1945), Italian police official
