= Wanaque, New Jersey =

Borough in Passaic County, New Jersey, US

- Borough
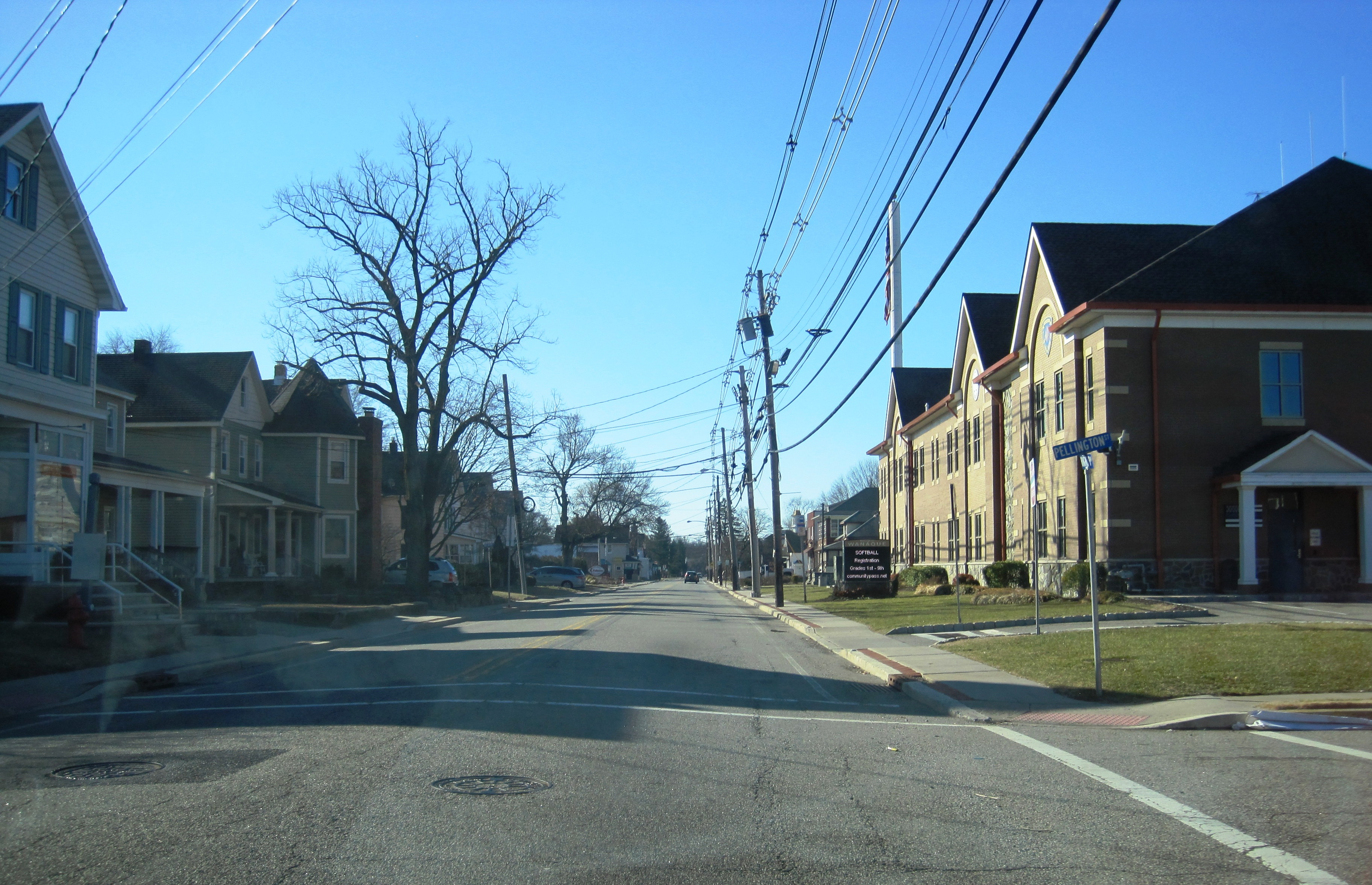
- Downtown Wanaque along southbound Ringwood Avenue (CR 511)

- Seal

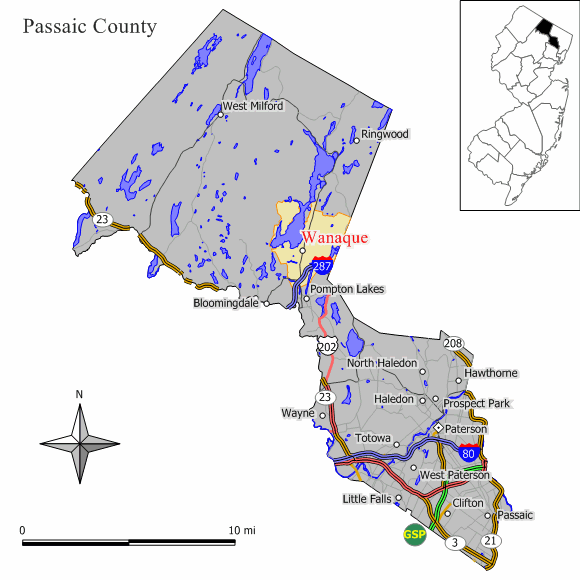
- Location of Wanaque in Passaic County. Inset: Passaic County highlighted in the State of New Jersey.

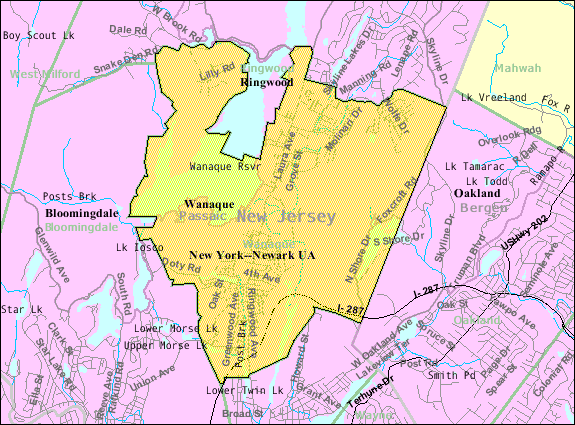
- Census Bureau map of Wanaque, New Jersey

- Location in Passaic County Location in New Jersey Location in the United States
- Coordinates: 41.042424°N 74.288643°W
- Country: United States
- State: New Jersey
- County: Passaic
- Incorporated: March 22, 1918

Government
  - Type: Borough
  - Body: Borough Council
  - Mayor: Daniel Mahler (R, term ends December 31, 2026)
  - Administrator: Robert G. Hermansen
  - Municipal clerk: Leena Abaza

Area
  - Total: 9.32 sq mi (24.15 km^{2})
  - Land: 8.06 sq mi (20.88 km^{2})
  - Water: 1.26 sq mi (3.26 km^{2}) 13.50%
  - Rank: 215th of 565 in state 5th of 16 in county
- Elevation: 220 ft (67 m)

Population (2020)
  - Total: 11,317
  - Estimate (2023): 11,048
  - Rank: 220th of 565 in state 10th of 16 in county
  - Density: 1,403/sq mi (542/km^{2})
  - Rank: 345th of 565 in state 13th of 16 in county
- Time zone: UTC−05:00 (Eastern (EST))
  - Summer (DST): UTC−04:00 (Eastern (EDT))
- ZIP Code: 07420 – Haskell; 07465 – Wanaque
- Area code: 973 Exchanges: 248, 616, 831, 835, 839
- FIPS code: 3403176730
- GNIS feature ID: 0885431
- Website: www.wanaqueborough.com

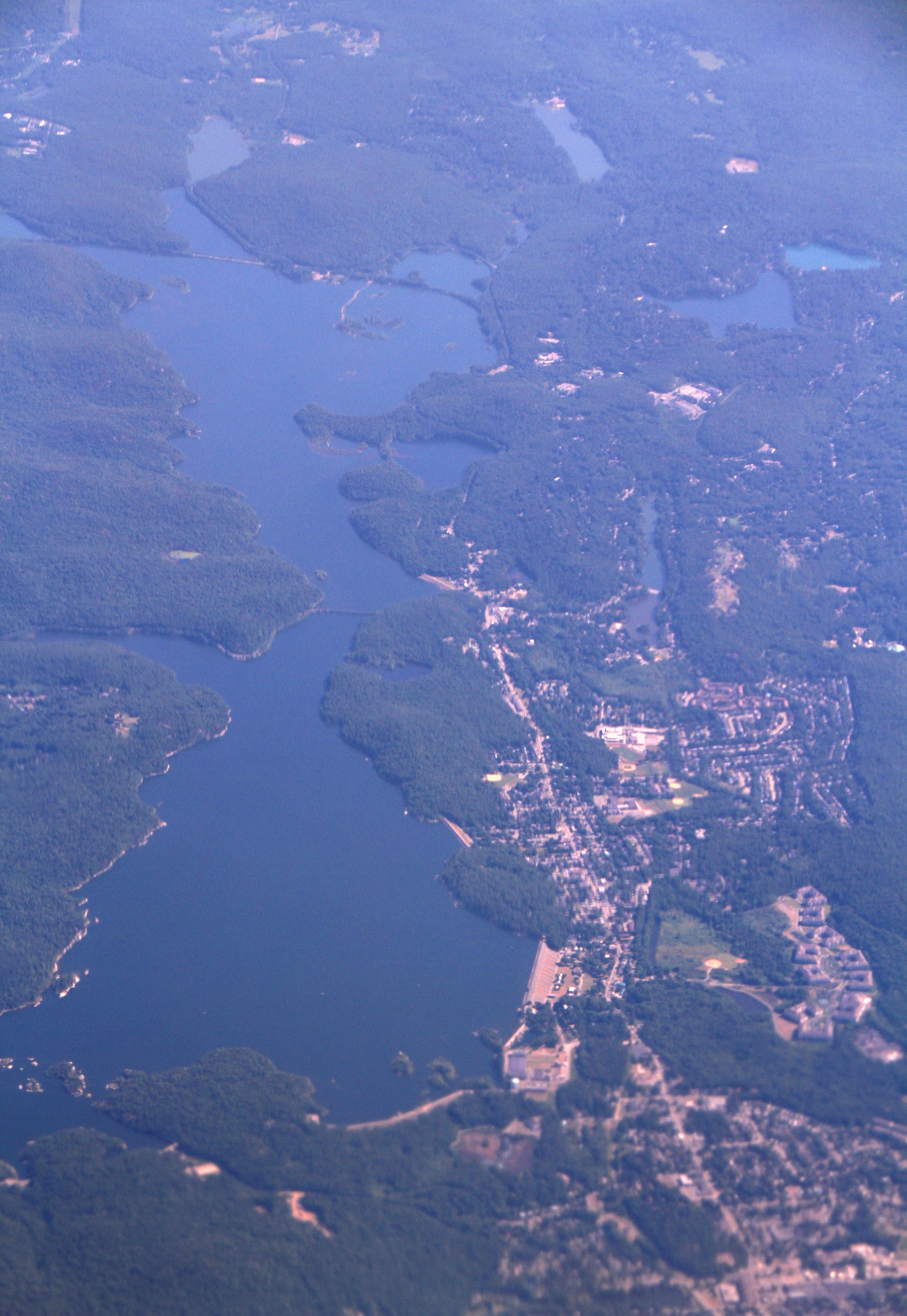
Aerial view of Wanaque (lower right) and Wanaque Reservoir

Wanaque (/ˈwɒnəkjuː, wəˈnɑːki/) is a borough in Passaic County, in the U.S. state of New Jersey. As of the 2020 United States census, the borough's population was 11,317, an increase of 201 (+1.8%) from the 2010 census count of 11,116, which in turn reflected an increase of 850 (+8.3%) from the 10,266 counted in the 2000 census.

== History ==
Wanaque was incorporated as an independent borough on February 23, 1918, when Pompton Township was split up into three boroughs, along with Bloomingdale and Ringwood, and affirmed by a referendum held on March 22, 1918. The borough's name Wanaque (original pronunciation 'Wa Na Kee') is thought to have been derived from a Lenni Lenape Native American word meaning "land of sassafras".

== Geography ==
According to the United States Census Bureau, the borough had a total area of 9.33 square miles (24.15 km^{2}), including 8.07 square miles (20.89 km^{2}) of land and 1.26 square miles (3.26 km^{2}) of water (13.50%).

Unincorporated communities, localities and place names located partially or completely within the borough include Haskell, Lake Inez, Lake Washington, Meadow Brook Lake, Midvale, Ramapo Lake, Rotten Pond, Stephens Lake and Upper Midvale.

Both Wanaque (formerly Midvale) and Haskell have their own ZIP Codes and are served by separate post offices.

The borough borders the municipalities of Bloomingdale, Pompton Lakes and Ringwood in Passaic County; and Oakland in Bergen County.

== Climate ==
Climate data for Wanaque, New Jersey, 1991–2020 normals, extremes 1945–2020
Month	Jan	Feb	Mar	Apr	May	Jun	Jul	Aug	Sep	Oct	Nov	Dec	Year
Record high °F (°C)	72 (22)	75 (24)	82 (28)	95 (35)	97 (36)	100 (38)	101 (38)	101 (38)	104 (40)	90 (32)	84 (29)	74 (23)	104 (40)
Mean daily maximum °F (°C)	37.7 (3.2)	40.5 (4.7)	47.8 (8.8)	59.5 (15.3)	71.0 (21.7)	79.4 (26.3)	84.3 (29.1)	82.8 (28.2)	76.0 (24.4)	64.2 (17.9)	52.6 (11.4)	42.6 (5.9)	61.5 (16.4)
Daily mean °F (°C)	28.8 (−1.8)	30.3 (−0.9)	38.4 (3.6)	49.3 (9.6)	60.2 (15.7)	68.9 (20.5)	74.2 (23.4)	72.9 (22.7)	66.0 (18.9)	53.6 (12.0)	43.6 (6.4)	34.8 (1.6)	51.8 (11.0)
Mean daily minimum °F (°C)	19.9 (−6.7)	20.0 (−6.7)	29.0 (−1.7)	39.0 (3.9)	49.5 (9.7)	58.3 (14.6)	64.2 (17.9)	62.9 (17.2)	55.9 (13.3)	43.0 (6.1)	34.6 (1.4)	26.9 (−2.8)	41.9 (5.5)
Record low °F (°C)	−20 (−29)	−13 (−25)	−1 (−18)	10 (−12)	24 (−4)	37 (3)	44 (7)	39 (4)	29 (−2)	20 (−7)	12 (−11)	−6 (−21)	−20 (−29)
Average precipitation inches (mm)	3.39 (86)	2.71 (69)	3.86 (98)	4.17 (106)	3.58 (91)	5.13 (130)	4.65 (118)	4.57 (116)	3.95 (100)	4.37 (111)	3.77 (96)	4.05 (103)	48.20 (1,224)
Average precipitation days (≥ 0.01 in)	9.8	7.4	10.0	10.7	11.7	10.9	10.1	9.7	8.5	9.0	8.1	9.6	115.5
Source 1: NOAA
Source 2: National Weather Service

== Demographics ==
Historical population
Census	Pop.	Note	%±
1920	2,916		—
1930	3,119		7.0%
1940	3,143		0.8%
1950	4,222		34.3%
1960	7,126		68.8%
1970	8,636		21.2%
1980	10,025		16.1%
1990	9,711		−3.1%
2000	10,266		5.7%
2010	11,116		8.3%
2020	11,317		1.8%
2023 (est.)	11,048	▼	−2.4%
Population sources: 1920; 1920–1930 1940–2000; 2000 2010 2020

=== 2020 census ===
As of the 2020 census, Wanaque had a population of 11,317. The median age was 45.9 years. 16.9% of residents were under the age of 18 and 23.9% of residents were 65 years of age or older. For every 100 females there were 92.2 males, and for every 100 females age 18 and over there were 89.2 males age 18 and over.

97.4% of residents lived in urban areas, while 2.6% lived in rural areas.

There were 4,392 households in Wanaque, of which 26.1% had children under the age of 18 living in them. Of all households, 52.6% were married-couple households, 14.3% were households with a male householder and no spouse or partner present, and 26.8% were households with a female householder and no spouse or partner present. About 24.9% of all households were made up of individuals and 13.7% had someone living alone who was 65 years of age or older.

There were 4,597 housing units, of which 4.5% were vacant. The homeowner vacancy rate was 0.7% and the rental vacancy rate was 4.2%.

Racial composition as of the 2020 census
Race	Number	Percent
White	8,706	76.9%
Black or African American	338	3.0%
American Indian and Alaska Native	51	0.5%
Asian	545	4.8%
Native Hawaiian and Other Pacific Islander	2	0.0%
Some other race	588	5.2%
Two or more races	1,087	9.6%
Hispanic or Latino (of any race)	1,659	14.7%

=== 2010 census ===
The 2010 United States census counted 11,116 people, 4,018 households, and 3,026 families in the borough. The population density was 1,391.2 per square mile (537.1/km^{2}). There were 4,184 housing units at an average density of 523.7 per square mile (202.2/km^{2}). The racial makeup was 87.48% (9,724) White, 3.07% (341) Black or African American, 0.40% (45) Native American, 4.65% (517) Asian, 0.01% (1) Pacific Islander, 2.25% (250) from other races, and 2.14% (238) from two or more races. Hispanic or Latino of any race were 9.67% (1,075) of the population.

Of the 4,018 households, 30.7% had children under the age of 18; 61.1% were married couples living together; 10.5% had a female householder with no husband present and 24.7% were non-families. Of all households, 20.0% were made up of individuals and 8.8% had someone living alone who was 65 years of age or older. The average household size was 2.66 and the average family size was 3.07.

20.6% of the population were under the age of 18, 6.9% from 18 to 24, 24.0% from 25 to 44, 30.2% from 45 to 64, and 18.2% who were 65 years of age or older. The median age was 43.8 years. For every 100 females, the population had 91.6 males. For every 100 females ages 18 and older there were 90.2 males.

The Census Bureau's 2006–2010 American Community Survey showed that (in 2010 inflation-adjusted dollars) median household income was $89,459 (with a margin of error of +/− $5,457) and the median family income was $98,081 (+/− $7,333). Males had a median income of $62,454 (+/− $4,289) versus $49,421 (+/− $6,017) for females. The per capita income for the borough was $37,579 (+/− $3,293). About 1.0% of families and 2.6% of the population were below the poverty line, including 3.3% of those under age 18 and 0.8% of those age 65 or over.

Same-sex couples headed 20 households in 2010, a decline from the 22 counted in 2000.

=== 2000 census ===
As of the 2000 United States census there were 10,266 people, 3,444 households, and 2,689 families residing in the borough. The population density was 1,286.8 inhabitants per square mile (496.8/km^{2}). There were 3,500 housing units at an average density of 438.7 per square mile (169.4/km^{2}). The racial makeup of the borough was 90.67% White, 1.51% African American, 0.34% Native American, 3.62% Asian, 0.03% Pacific Islander, 2.06% from other races, and 1.77% from two or more races. Hispanic or Latino of any race were 5.40% of the population.

There were 3,444 households, out of which 37.9% had children under the age of 18 living with them, 63.2% were married couples living together, 10.9% had a female householder with no husband present, and 21.9% were non-families. 16.7% of all households were made up of individuals, and 5.8% had someone living alone who was 65 years of age or older. The average household size was 2.86 and the average family size was 3.23.

In the borough the population was spread out, with 24.4% under the age of 18, 6.9% from 18 to 24, 31.7% from 25 to 44, 25.0% from 45 to 64, and 12.0% who were 65 years of age or older. The median age was 38 years. For every 100 females, there were 93.3 males. For every 100 females age 18 and over, there were 91.4 males.

The median income for a household in the borough was $66,113, and the median income for a family was $71,127. Males had a median income of $43,675 versus $33,380 for females. The per capita income for the borough was $25,403. About 2.6% of families and 3.3% of the population were below the poverty line, including 3.5% of those under age 18 and 4.1% of those age 65 or over.

== Parks and recreation ==
Back Beach Park is a 27-acre (11 ha) recreational park located in Haskell, that features various sports fields and hiking trails. Completed at a cost o $290,000 on and purchased in the early 1980, a took a decade to complete the park amid environmental challenges. Accessible trails include the Wanaque Ridge, which overlooks the town at its peak, as well as the Indian Hills Trail, which connects to the Ramapo Valley County Reservation in Mahwah.

== Law and government ==
=== Local government ===
Wanaque is governed under the borough form of New Jersey municipal government, which is used in 218 municipalities (of the 564) statewide, making it the most common form of government in New Jersey. The governing body is comprised of the mayor and the borough council, with all positions elected at-large on a partisan basis as part of the November general election. The mayor is elected directly by the voters to a four-year term of office. The borough council includes six members elected to serve three-year terms on a staggered basis, with two seats coming up for election each year in a three-year cycle. The borough form of government used by Wanaque is a "weak mayor / strong council" government in which council members act as the legislative body with the mayor presiding at meetings and voting only in the event of a tie. The mayor can veto ordinances subject to an override by a two-thirds majority vote of the council. The mayor makes committee and liaison assignments for council members, and most appointments are made by the mayor with the advice and consent of the council.

As of 2023, the mayor of Wanaque Borough is Republican Daniel Mahler, whose term of office ends December 31, 2026. Members of the Borough Council are Thomas Balunis (R, 2024), Dominick Cortellessa (R, 2025), Edward Leonard (R, 2025), Donald Pasquariello (R, 2023), Bridget A. Pasznik (R, 2024), and Robert Pettet (R, 2023).

=== Federal, state, and county representation ===
Wanaque is located in the 5th Congressional District and is part of New Jersey's 26th state legislative district.

For the 119th United States Congress, New Jersey's 5th congressional district is represented by Josh Gottheimer (D, Wyckoff). New Jersey is represented in the United States Senate by Democrats Cory Booker (Newark, term ends 2027) and Andy Kim (Moorestown, term ends 2031).

For the 2026–2027 session, the 26th legislative district of the New Jersey Legislature is represented in the State Senate by Joseph Pennacchio (R, Rockaway Township) and in the General Assembly by Brian Bergen (R, Denville Township) and Jay Webber (R, Morris Plains).

Passaic County is governed by a Board of County Commissioners, comprised of seven members who are elected at-large to staggered three-year terms office on a partisan basis, with two or three seats coming up for election each year as part of the November general election in a three-year cycle. At a reorganization meeting held in January, the board selects a Director and Deputy Director from among its members to serve for a one-year term. As of 2026, Passaic County's Commissioners are: Director Cassandra "Sandi" Lazzara (D), Little Falls, term as commissioner ends December 31, 2027; term as director ends 2026), Deputy Director Orlando Cruz (D, Paterson, term as commissioner and as deputy director ends 2026), Rodney DeVore (D, Paterson, 2027), Bruce James (D, Clifton, 2026) Michael Ramaglia (D, West Milford, 2028), Christina Schratz (D, Passaic, 2028) and Nick Veliky (D, Clifton, appointed to a term ending in 2027).

Constitutional officers, elected on a countywide basis, are County Clerk Danielle Ireland-Imhof (D, Hawthorne, 2028), Sheriff Thomas Adamo (D, Wayne, 2027) and Surrogate Zoila S. Cassanova (D, Wayne, 2026).

=== Highlands protection ===
In 2004, the New Jersey Legislature passed the Highlands Water Protection and Planning Act, which regulates the New Jersey Highlands region. Wanaque was included in the highlands preservation area and is subject to the rules of the act and the Highlands Water Protection and Planning Council, a division of the New Jersey Department of Environmental Protection. Some of the territory in the protected region is classified as being in the highlands preservation area, and thus subject to additional rules.

=== Politics ===
As of March 2011, there were a total of 7,085 registered voters in Wanaque, of which 1,646 (23.2% vs. 31.0% countywide) were registered as Democrats, 2,191 (30.9% vs. 18.7%) were registered as Republicans and 3,243 (45.8% vs. 50.3%) were registered as Unaffiliated. There were 5 voters registered as Libertarians or Greens. Among the borough's 2010 Census population, 63.7% (vs. 53.2% in Passaic County) were registered to vote, including 80.3% of those ages 18 and over (vs. 70.8% countywide).

Gubernatorial election results for Wanaque
Year	Republican		Democratic		Third party(ies)	
Year	No.	%	No.	%	No.	%
2025	2,612	52.05%	2,386	47.55%	20	0.40%
2021	2,322	56.55%	1,751	42.64%	33	0.80%
2017	1,608	50.53%	1,485	46.67%	89	2.80%
2013	2,107	66.11%	1,042	32.70%	38	1.19%
2009	1,802	53.50%	1,338	39.73%	228	6.77%
2005	1,228	48.40%	1,227	48.36%	82	3.23%

In the 2012 presidential election, Republican Mitt Romney received 51.7% of the vote (2,633 cast), ahead of Democrat Barack Obama with 47.2% (2,400 votes), and other candidates with 1.1% (55 votes), among the 5,132 ballots cast by the borough's 7,472 registered voters (44 ballots were spoiled), for a turnout of 68.7%. In the 2008 presidential election, Republican John McCain received 2,798 votes (52.1% vs. 37.7% countywide), ahead of Democrat Barack Obama with 2,428 votes (45.2% vs. 58.8%) and other candidates with 46 votes (0.9% vs. 0.8%), among the 5,374 ballots cast by the borough's 7,117 registered voters, for a turnout of 75.5% (vs. 70.4% in Passaic County). In the 2004 presidential election, Republican George W. Bush received 2,452 votes (55.1% vs. 42.7% countywide), ahead of Democrat John Kerry with 1,876 votes (42.1% vs. 53.9%) and other candidates with 39 votes (0.9% vs. 0.7%), among the 4,451 ballots cast by the borough's 6,132 registered voters, for a turnout of 72.6% (vs. 69.3% in the whole county).

Presidential elections results
Year	Republican	Democratic	Third Parties
2024	55.3% 3,524	42.3% 2,697	2.4% 127
2020	51.8% 3,532	45.6% 3,110	2.6% 109
2016	54.0% 2,992	41.8% 2,315	3.2% 175
2012	51.7% 2,633	47.2% 2,400	1.1% 55
2008	52.1% 2,798	45.2% 2,428	0.9% 46
2004	55.1% 2,452	42.1% 1,876	0.9% 39

In the 2013 gubernatorial election, Republican Chris Christie received 66.1% of the vote (2,107 cast), ahead of Democrat Barbara Buono with 32.7% (1,042 votes), and other candidates with 1.2% (38 votes), among the 3,235 ballots cast by the borough's 7,614 registered voters (48 ballots were spoiled), for a turnout of 42.5%. In the 2009 gubernatorial election, Republican Chris Christie received 1,802 votes (53.1% vs. 43.2% countywide), ahead of Democrat Jon Corzine with 1,338 votes (39.4% vs. 50.8%), Independent Chris Daggett with 194 votes (5.7% vs. 3.8%) and other candidates with 34 votes (1.0% vs. 0.9%), among the 3,396 ballots cast by the borough's 6,887 registered voters, yielding a 49.3% turnout (vs. 42.7% in the county).

United States Senate election results for Wanaque1
Year	Republican		Democratic		Third party(ies)	
Year	No.	%	No.	%	No.	%
2024	3,242	53.70%	2,634	43.63%	161	2.67%
2018	2,432	52.47%	1,874	40.43%	329	7.10%
2012	2,288	50.13%	2,185	47.87%	91	1.99%
2006	1,377	52.30%	1,206	45.80%	50	1.90%

United States Senate election results for Wanaque2
Year	Republican		Democratic		Third party(ies)	
Year	No.	%	No.	%	No.	%
2020	3,367	50.87%	3,072	46.41%	180	2.72%
2014	1,357	51.30%	1,239	46.84%	49	1.85%
2013	1,145	53.83%	961	45.18%	21	0.99%
2008	2,420	50.44%	2,265	47.21%	113	2.36%

== Education ==
The Wanaque Borough Schools serves students in public school for pre-kindergarten through eighth grade. As of the 2021–22 school year, the district, comprised of two schools, had an enrollment of 861 students and 92.0 classroom teachers (on an FTE basis), for a student–teacher ratio of 9.4:1. Schools in the district (with 2021–22 enrollment data from the National Center for Education Statistics) are Haskell Elementary School 367 students in grades PreK–8 and Wanaque Elementary School 484 students in grades PreK–8.

Students in public school for ninth through twelfth grades attend Lakeland Regional High School, which serves students from the Boroughs of Ringwood and Wanaque. The high school is located in Wanaque and is part of the Lakeland Regional High School District. As of the 2021–22 school year, the high school had an enrollment of 902 students and 81.7 classroom teachers (on an FTE basis), for a student–teacher ratio of 11.0:1.

Wanaque is the site of Passaic County Community College's Wanaque Academic Center.

== Transportation ==
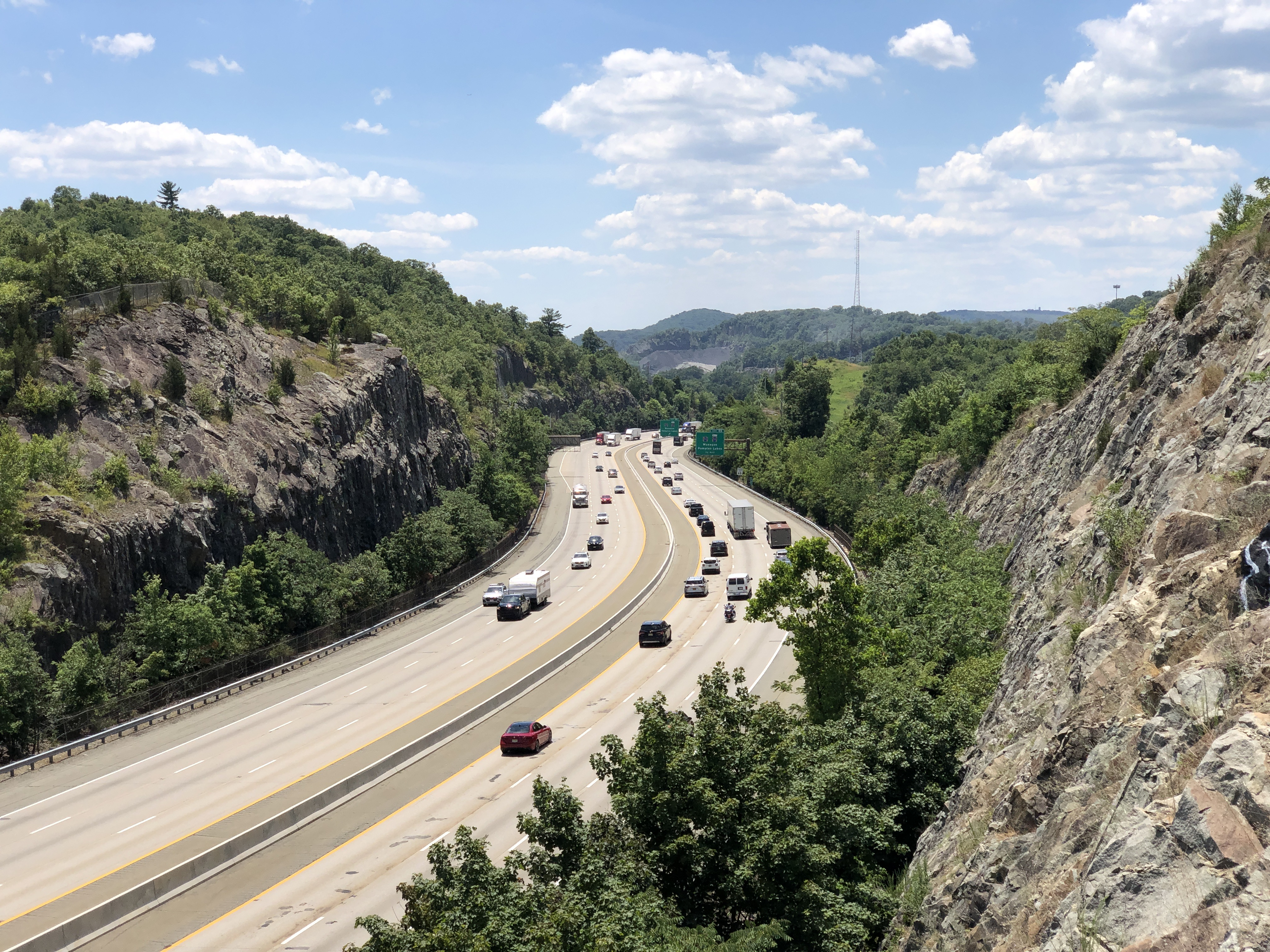
Interstate 287 southbound in Wanaque

=== Roads and highways ===
As of May 2010, the borough had a total of 36.45 miles (58.66 km) of roadways, of which 29.30 miles (47.15 km) were maintained by the municipality, 4.96 miles (7.98 km) by Passaic County and 2.18 miles (3.51 km) by the New Jersey Department of Transportation.

Several major roadways traverse through the borough. Interstate 287 passes through Wanaque for 2.2 miles (3.5 km), where it is accessible at Exit 55, near the intersection of Union and Ringwood Avenues (County Route 511).

=== Public transportation ===
NJ Transit provides bus service to and from the Port Authority Bus Terminal in Midtown Manhattan on the 197 route.

== Notable people ==
People who were born in, residents of, or otherwise closely associated with Wanaque include:

- Kevin Carolan (born 1968), actor and comedian
- Bobby Czyz (born 1962), boxer who is both a former world light heavyweight and cruiserweight champion
- Loretta Ford (1920–2025), nurse who was the co-founder of the first nurse practitioner program
- John McCutcheon (1879–1942), politician who served as the New Jersey State Comptroller and the Passaic County Clerk
- Bill Palatucci, (born 1958), attorney who served on the Republican National Committee and the New Jersey Apportionment Commission, and headed selection of staff for the first presidential transition of Donald Trump
- Ernestine Petras (1924–2017), infielder who played in the All-American Girls Professional Baseball League
- John Pfahl (1939–2020), photographer
- Chris Port (born 1967), former NFL offensive lineman who played for five seasons for the New Orleans Saints
- Fred Strickland (born 1966), former professional football player who played linebacker in the NFL for 12 seasons

== Points of interest ==
Elks Camp Moore is an Elks accredited summer overnight camp for children with special needs. The camp is located high on top of a mountain overlooking Route 287 in Haskell. Admission is free for the campers, and the camp is funded in part by local New Jersey Elks lodges.
