= Lakeland Regional High School =

High school in Passaic County, New Jersey, US

Lakeland Regional High School District

Location
- 205 Conklintown Road Wanaque, Passaic County, New Jersey, 07465; United States
- Coordinates: 41.059688°N 74.28061°W

District information
- Grades: 9-12
- Superintendent: Hugh Beattie
- Business administrator: Kathryn Davenport
- Schools: 1

Students and staff
- Enrollment: 837 (as of 2024–25)
- Faculty: 74.7 FTEs
- Student–teacher ratio: 11.2:1

Other information
- District Factor Group: FG
- Website: www.lakeland.k12.nj.us
Ind.	Per pupil	District spending	Rank (*)	9-12 average	%± vs. average
1A	Total Spending	$20,341	21	$18,891	7.7%
1	Budgetary Cost	16,768	31	15,592	7.5%
2	Classroom Instruction	9,863	40	8,807	12.0%
6	Support Services	2,959	39	2,294	29.0%
8	Administrative Cost	1,429	11	1,592	−10.2%
10	Operations & Maintenance	1,559	8	1,954	−20.2%
13	Extracurricular Activities	807	19	873	−7.6%
16	Median Teacher Salary	70,785	29	71,726
Data from NJDoE 2014 Taxpayers' Guide to Education Spending. *Of 9-12 districts with any number of students. Lowest spending=1; Highest=47

Lakeland Regional High School

Information
- Type: Public high school
- Established: September 1958
- NCES School ID: 340819004818
- Faculty: 74.7 FTEs
- Grades: 9 - 12
- Enrollment: 823 (as of 2024–25)
- Student to teacher ratio: 11.0:1
- Colors: Red; Gray
- Athletics conference: Big North Conference (general); North Jersey Super Football Conference (football)
- Team name: Lancers
- Rival: West Milford Highlanders
- Publication: Phoenix (literary magazine)
- Newspaper: Lancer Ledger

Lakeland Regional High School is a comprehensive regional four-year public high school and school district serving students from the Boroughs of Ringwood and Wanaque (including its Haskell neighborhood), communities in Passaic County, in the U.S. state of New Jersey, which have a combined population of about 25,000. It is the only school in the Lakeland Regional High School District.

Students come to the high school from the Ringwood Public School District and the Wanaque Borough Schools. Lakeland Regional High School is accredited by the State of New Jersey.

As of the 2024–25 school year, the school had an enrollment of 823 students and 74.7 classroom teachers (on an FTE basis), for a student–teacher ratio of 11.0:1. There were 114 students (13.9% of enrollment) eligible for free lunch and 12 (1.5% of students) eligible for reduced-cost lunch.

The high school has 115 professional staff members, with 60% having advanced degrees. There are 95 teachers, five area supervisors, and four guidance counselors. Lakeland also has a substance awareness coordinator, a complete child study team, a school nurse, a library-media specialist, an athletic trainer and several teacher aides.

== History ==
The name Lakeland Regional High School was chosen at a board of education meeting in February 1956. Voters approved a July 1956 referendum that allocated $38,000 to purchase a 23-acre (9.3 ha) site for the new school. The school was designed to accommodate 800 students and was constructed at a cost of $2 million (equivalent to $22.9 million in 2025). The school opened in September 1958. Before the district was established, students from both Ringwood and Wanaque had attended Butler High School.

The district had been classified by the New Jersey Department of Education as being in District Factor Group "FG", the fourth-highest of eight groupings. District Factor Groups organize districts statewide to allow comparison by common socioeconomic characteristics of the local districts. From lowest socioeconomic status to highest, the categories are A, B, CD, DE, FG, GH, I and J.

== Awards, recognition and rankings ==
In the 2000-01 school year, Lakeland Regional High School was recognized as a New Jersey Best Practice School for its S.C.O.P.E., Search, S.T.E.P., and SOAR School-to-Career / Workplace Environment programs.

For the 1994–95 school year, Lakeland Regional High School was named a "Star School" by the New Jersey Department of Education, the highest honor that a New Jersey school can achieve.

The school was the 112th-ranked public high school in New Jersey out of 339 schools statewide in New Jersey Monthly magazine's September 2014 cover story on the state's "Top Public High Schools", using a new ranking methodology. The school had been ranked 87th in the state of 328 schools in 2012, after being ranked 145th in 2010 out of 322 schools listed. The magazine ranked the school 131st in the magazine's September 2008 issue, and 140th in the September 2006 issue, which surveyed 316 schools across the state. Schooldigger.com ranked the school 140th out of 381 public high schools statewide in its 2011 rankings (an increase of 8 positions from the 2010 ranking) which were based on the combined percentage of students classified as proficient or above proficient on the mathematics (83.9%) and language arts literacy (94.5%) components of the High School Proficiency Assessment (HSPA).

== Curriculum ==
As a requirement for graduation, Lakeland students must complete 135 credits, demonstrate mastery of basic skills on the High School Proficiency Assessment (HSPA), and meet a variety of local and state distribution requirements.

Advanced Placement Program (AP) courses include AP English Language and Composition, AP United States History, AP United States Government and Politics, AP Calculus AB, AP Computer Science, AP Biology, AP Chemistry, AP Environmental Science, AP Music Theory, AP European History and AP Spanish Language.

Honors courses are offered in English, Algebra 2, Geometry, Pre-calculus, Calculus, Spanish 4 & 5, French 4, Latin 4, World History, US History, Biology, Chemistry, Physics, Earth Science, and Gifted and Talented Senior Seminar.

Specialized learning programs, including interdisciplinary projects, are conducted using the high technology multimedia laboratory. Gifted and talented students are offered enrichment opportunities through the various departments and the G & T Coordinator. Other programs include School, Career Orientation and Personal Education (SCOPE); the Career Research Project (SEARCH); Students to Experience Professions (STEP); and SOAR, the portfolio completion course. A third New Jersey Best Practice was awarded for this School to Career Program.

Electives are offered in most of the core subjects. The school provides practical experiences and a range of studies in the area of communication, transportation, energy and manufacturing. Course offerings are provided in business education and family and consumer sciences. Fine arts electives include music and art offerings.

== Athletics ==
The Lakeland Regional High School Lancers compete in the Big North Conference, which is comprised of public and private high schools in Bergen and Passaic counties and was established following a reorganization of sports leagues in Northern New Jersey by the New Jersey State Interscholastic Athletic Association (NJSIAA). For the 2009–10 school year, Lakeland was part of the North Jersey Tri-County Conference, a conference established on an interim basis to facilitate the realignment. Prior to the NJSIAA's realignment of New Jersey high school sports leagues which took effect beginning in 2009, Lakeland was a part of the Suburban Division of the Northern Hills Conference, which included schools in Essex, Morris and Passaic counties. With 696 students in grades 10–12, the school was classified by the NJSIAA for the 2019–20 school year as Group II for most athletic competition purposes, which included schools with an enrollment of 486 to 758 students in that grade range. The football team competes in the Patriot Blue division of the North Jersey Super Football Conference, which includes 112 schools competing in 20 divisions, making it the nation's biggest football-only high school sports league. The school was classified by the NJSIAA as Group II North for football for 2024–26, which included schools with 484 to 683 students.

The school participates as the host school / lead agency for joint cooperative boys / girls swimming teams with West Milford High School. These co-op programs operate under agreements scheduled to expire at the end of the 2023–24 school year.

The baseball team won the North I Group II state sectional title in 1962 and 1968, won the Group II title in 1974 vs. Lawrence High School and the Group III state championship in 1976 vs. Ridge High School. The 1974 team finished the season with a 25-3 record after winning the Group II title with a 5-4 victory in the championship game against a Lawrence team that came into the finals unbeaten in its previous 18 games.

The boys' cross country team won the Group II state championship in 1969.

The field hockey team won the North I Group III state sectional championship in 1981.

The boys' volleyball team won the overall state championship in 1988 (defeating runner-up St. Joseph High School in the final match of the tournament) and 1992 (vs. Bridgewater-Raritan High School).

The football team won the NJSIAA North I Group II state sectional championship in 2004 and 2010. In 2004, the Lancers won the NJSIAA North I, Group II state championship, defeating Lenape Valley Regional High School in double overtime by a score of 17-14 at Giants Stadium, making it the first football state champions in Lakeland's history. The Lakeland Lancers football team made it to the North I Group II state championship final again in 2008, but lost by a score of 35-6 to first seed Wayne Hills High School, which was riding a 51-game winning streak and was the four-time defending champion, with Lakeland ending the season with a record of 11-1 after losing in the first match between the two teams. In 2010, the Lancers faced Ramsey High School in the North 1, Group II championship game at Kean University. They were victorious, winning the game 20-0 for the second football state title in school history.

== Notable alumni ==
- Bobby Czyz (born 1962), former world light heavyweight and cruiserweight champion boxer
- Vincent Czyz (born 1963), writer and critic of speculative fiction
- Garrett Gardner, singer and songwriter who finished in the top 12 in season 4 of The Voice
- Jeff Livesey (born 1966), baseball coach
- Eric Schubert (born 1962), former placekicker who played in the NFL for the New York Giants, St. Louis Cardinals and New England Patriots
- Darren Soto (born 1978), attorney and politician from Orlando, Florida, who is the U.S. representative for Florida's 9th congressional district
- Fred Strickland (born 1966), linebacker who played for 12 seasons in the NFL
- Mark Trakh (born 1955), head coach of the USC Trojans women's basketball team
- Benny Yurco (born 1981), musician and record producer who has been a member of Grace Potter and the Nocturnals

== Administration ==
Core members of the district / school administration include:

- Hugh Beattie, superintendent
- Kathryn Davenport, business administrator and board secretary

In the wake of a $340,000 cut in state aid, the district eliminated the position of principal for the 2019-20 school year in a cost-saving measure. (This is ongoing as of 2022.)

== Board of education ==
The district's board of education, comprised of nine members, sets policy and oversees the fiscal and educational operation of the district through its administration. As a Type II school district, the board's trustees are elected directly by voters to serve three-year terms of office on a staggered basis, with three seats up for election each year held (since 2012) as part of the November general election. The board appoints a superintendent to oversee the district's day-to-day operations and a business administrator to supervise the business functions of the district.
