= John Pfahl =

American photographer (1939–2020)

John Pfahl (February 17, 1939 – April 15, 2020) was an American photographer.

== Life ==
Pfahl was born in New York City and grew up in Wanaque, New Jersey. He is known for his landscape photography such as his 1974 "Altered Landscapes" series. He received a BFA from Syracuse University's College of Visual and Performing Arts and his MA from Syracuse University's S. I. Newhouse School of Public Communications. He taught at the Rochester Institute of Technology, Rochester, New York, from 1968 to 1983. Later he was professor at the University of New Mexico, Albuquerque. In 2012 he taught at the University at Buffalo, The State University of New York.

Pfahl died from COVID-19 on April 15, 2020, in Buffalo, New York during the COVID-19 pandemic in the United States.

== Publications ==
- A Distanced Land – The Photographs of John Pfahl. Buffalo: Buffalo Fine Arts Academy/Albright-Knox Art Gallery; Albuquerque: University of New Mexico Press, 1990. ISBN 0-8263-1214-4.
- With Rebecca Solnit: Extreme Horticulture. London: Frances Lincoln, 2003. ISBN 978-0711220126.

== Collections ==
Pfahl's work is held in the following permanent collections:

- Art Institute of Chicago: 81 prints (as of January 2021)
- Cleveland Museum of Art: 3 prints (as of January 2021)
- George Eastman House International Museum of Photography
- Museum of Contemporary Art, Los Angeles
- Museum of Contemporary Photography, Chicago, Illinois: 17 prints (as of January 2021)
- Smart Museum of Art, Chicago, Illinois

== See also ==
- List of photographers
- Land art
