= New Jersey Redistricting Commission =

US state constitutional body

The New Jersey Redistricting Commission is a constitutional body of the government of New Jersey tasked with redrawing the state's Congressional election districts after each decade's census. Like Arizona, Idaho, Hawaii, Montana, and Washington, the redistricting is completed within an independent, bipartisan commission. The apportionment of members of the Redistricting Commission is carefully balanced between legislative and executive majorities and is purposefully designed to allow the minority party an equal number of seats on the commission. This commission deals with districts for the U.S. House of Representatives while the New Jersey Apportionment Commission deals with legislative districts for the New Jersey Legislature.

According to the state Constitution, New Jersey's commission has 13 members. The President of the Senate and Assembly Speaker each name two members; the minority leaders of both houses each name two members and the state's Democratic and Republican chairpersons each name two members. The 12 members then select a 13th tie-breaking member to chair of the commission. If they cannot agree on the 13th member, then each party submits a name to the state's Supreme Court, which chooses one as the 13th member. The commission is required to hold three public meetings but is otherwise allowed to meet in private until it releases its new map.

== Congressional maps ==
=== 2003 to 2013 ===
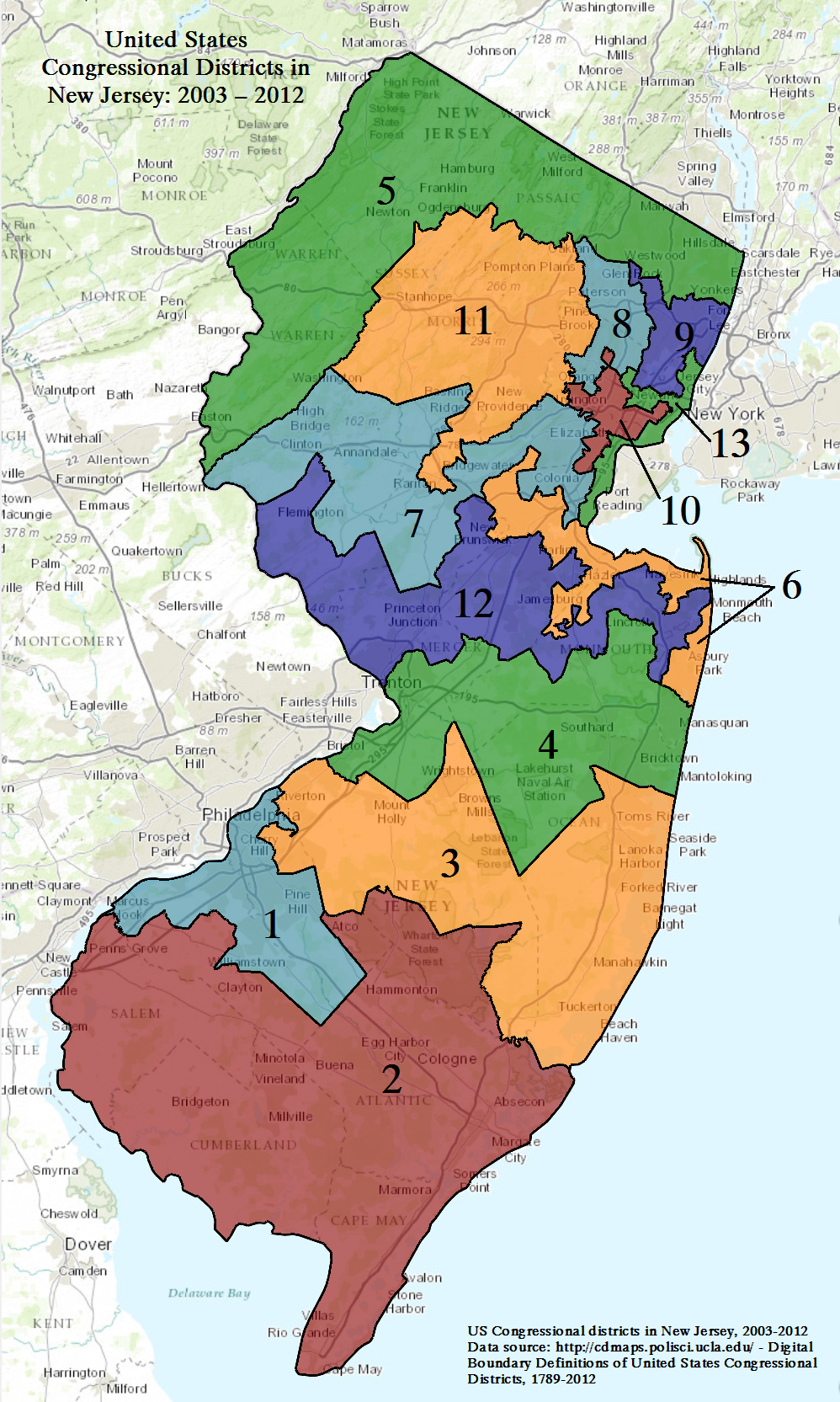

=== 2013 to 2023 ===
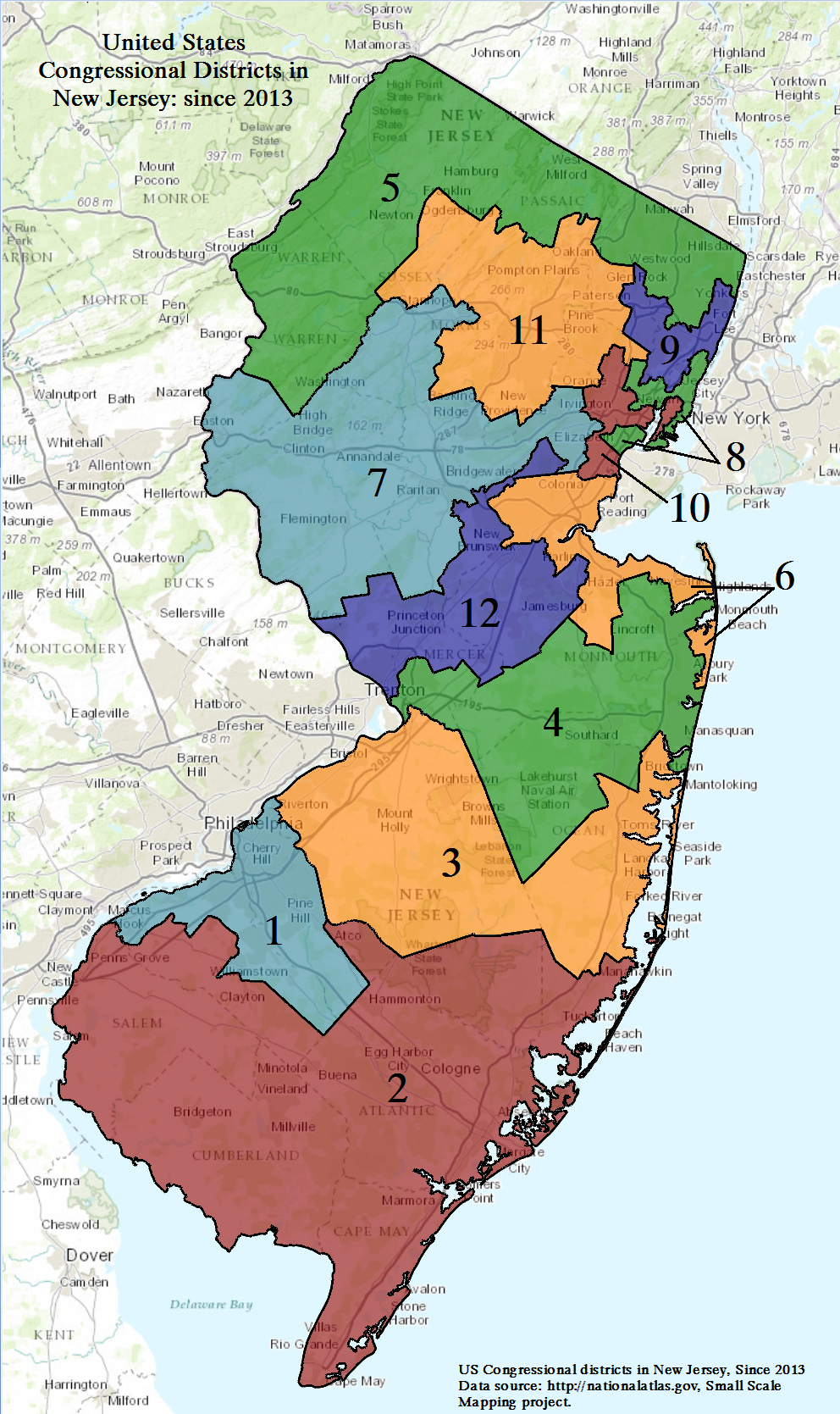

On December 23, 2011, the New Jersey Congressional Redistricting Committee consolidated New Jersey's then 13 House seats into 12 congressional districts due to the results of the 2010 US Census.

Even though both houses of the New Jersey State Legislature were controlled by Democrats, and New Jersey's Congressional delegation in Washington, DC was made up of a majority of Democratic members, the half Democrat and half Republican Commission named a Republican, John Farmer, Jr., as its tie-breaker. Farmer was the former Chief Counsel to Republican Governor Christine Todd Whitman and former New Jersey Attorney General under Republican Governors Whitman and Donald Di Francesco. Earlier in the year, Farmer had been counsel to the New Jersey Apportionment Commission, but not a member of that Commission nor the tie-breaker. The tie-breaker on that Commission was Rutgers University Professor Alan Rosenthal, a Democrat. Of the six Democrats on the New Jersey Congressional Redistricting Commission, none were from Bergen County, which was the largest county by population in New Jersey.

On December 23, 2011, the Commission chose a map by a 7–6 vote, with Farmer voting for the map advocated for by Republican members. That map created a new 5th Congressional District, combining parts of the existing 5th Congressional District, represented by Rep. Scott Garrett, with parts of the 8th Congressional District, which was represented by Rep. William Pascrell, and parts of the 9th Congressional District, which was represented by Rep. Steve Rothman.

The Republican plan chosen by the Redistricting Commission removed seven of the largest Democratic vote-producing municipalities from the 9th District (the Jersey City, North Bergen, and Kearny sections of the District; Fairview, Hackensack, Fair Lawn, and two-thirds of Teaneck) and moved major Passaic County cities and towns (Paterson, Passaic and Clifton, Haledon and Prospect Park) into the 9th Congressional District. Meanwhile, the Democratic-held 13th district centered in Hudson County was eliminated altogether, with its remnants becoming the new 8th district. The remaining portions of the old 9th district were shifted into the strongly Republican 5th, thereby making that seat significantly more competitive. The incumbent congressmen in both the 8th and 9th districts, Bill Pascrell and Steve Rothman, announced that they would run in the Democratic primary for the redrawn 9th Congressional District. Rothman was defeated by Pascrell in the 2012 Democratic primary

In describing the redistricting process, Record editorial page editor Alfred Doblin wrote "While many folks are looking at the new 5th District as being a combination of the existing 5th and 9th districts, it's really the current 8th District that is getting the lion's share of Rothman's 9th. Rothman's constituents are in what these folks are calling Pascrell's district. From a Pascrell point of view, the conversation is going very nicely indeed. No one has been suggesting that Pascrell is the man under the bus. Few suggested last week that the Republican map was really about two incumbent Democrats battling each other, yet that may very well have been the GOP's intent all along." Doblin continued by writing that Rothman "had been swallowed by a whale," like the Biblical Jonah. He described Rothman as "'a mensch', 'a person of integrity and honor.'"

The 2012 elections immediately after the redistricting resulted in six Democrats and six Republicans being elected, despite President Obama winning the state 58–41% that year. However, the 2018 elections saw a strong Democratic electoral environment, and Democrats won 11 of the 12 districts, as the previously Republican-leaning 2nd, 3rd, 5th, 7th, and 11th district elected Democrats. The 4th district remained the only seat left with a Republican representative. At the end of the decade, Democrats held a 10-2 majority, with Republicans only holding the 2nd and 4th districts.

=== 2023 to 2033 ===
New Jersey's congressional districts since 2023

On December 22, 2021, the Commission passed a new map following the 2020 census. This map advanced the Democratic proposal on a 7-6 vote, as the tie-breaker, Democrat John E. Wallace Jr., provided the decisive vote. The map converted the previously competitive 3rd, 5th, and 11th districts into more reliable Democratic seats while making the competitive Democratic-held 7th district more Republican. It was predicted that Democrats would win a 9-3 advantage with the map, which did occur after the 2022 elections, the first election held under the new map. This map is significantly more Democratic than its predecessor as Joe Biden would have carried 10 of the 12 districts, as opposed to the previous map's 9, and Phil Murphy would have carried 9 seats in 2021 as opposed to 6.
