= Little Falls Township Public Schools =

School district in Passaic County, New Jersey, US

Address
- 32 Stevens Avenue Little Falls, Passaic County, New Jersey, 07424; United States
- Coordinates: 40.8798°N 74.2288°W

District information
- Grades: PreK-8
- Superintendent: Tracey L. Marinelli
- Business administrator: Melissa Sanzari-Stevens
- Schools: 3

Students and staff
- Enrollment: 959 (as of 2024–25)
- Faculty: 88.0 FTEs
- Student–teacher ratio: 10.9:1

Other information
- District Factor Group: FG
- Website: District website
Ind.	Per pupil	District spending	Rank (*)	K-8 average	%± vs. average
1A	Total Spending	$16,801	34	$18,891	−11.1%
1	Budgetary Cost	14,449	47	14,159	2.0%
2	Classroom Instruction	9,398	67	8,659	8.5%
6	Support Services	2,143	49	2,167	−1.1%
8	Administrative Cost	1,503	33	1,547	−2.8%
10	Operations & Maintenance	1,314	20	1,612	−18.5%
13	Extracurricular Activities	64	18	104	−38.5%
16	Median Teacher Salary	47,663	1	61,136
Data from NJDoE 2014 Taxpayers' Guide to Education Spending. *Of K-8 districts with more than 750 students. Lowest spending=1; Highest=84

The Little Falls Township Public Schools is a community public school district that serves students in pre-kindergarten through eighth grade from Little Falls, in Passaic County, in the U.S. state of New Jersey.

As of the 2024–25 school year, the district, comprised of three schools, had an enrollment of 959 students and 88.0 classroom teachers (on an FTE basis), for a student–teacher ratio of 10.9:1.

The New Jersey Department of Education had classified the district as being in District Factor Group "FG," the fourth-highest of eight groupings. District Factor Groups organize districts statewide to allow comparison by common socioeconomic characteristics of the local districts. The categories from lowest socioeconomic status to highest are A, B, CD, DE, FG, GH, I and J.

For ninth through twelfth grades, students in public school attend Passaic Valley Regional High School, which also serves students from Totowa and Woodland Park. The school facility is located in Little Falls. As of the 2024–25 school year, the high school had an enrollment of 1,093 students and 82.4 classroom teachers (on an FTE basis), for a student–teacher ratio of 13.3:1.

== Awards and recognition ==
Little Falls School #3 was honored by the National Blue Ribbon Schools Program in 2019, one of nine schools in the state recognized as Exemplary High Performing Schools.

== Schools ==
Schools in the district (with 2024–25 enrollment data from the National Center for Education Statistics) are:

Elementary schools

- Little Falls School #2 with 343 students in grades PreK-2
  - Jill Castaldo, principal
- Little Falls School #3 with 217 students in grades 3-4
  - Nicole Boyce, principal

Middle school

- Little Falls School #1 with 392 students in grades 5-8
  - Dana Sprague, principal

== Administration ==
Core members of the district's administration are:

- Tracey L. Marinelli, superintendent
- Melissa Sanzari-Stevens, business administrator and board secretary

== Board of Education ==
The district's board of education, comprised of nine members, sets policy and oversees the fiscal and educational operation of the district through its administration. As a Type II school district, the board's trustees are elected directly by voters to serve three-year terms of office on a staggered basis, with three seats up for election each year held (since 2012) as part of the November general election. The board appoints a superintendent to oversee the district's day-to-day operations and a business administrator to supervise the district's business functions.
