= McCutchen =

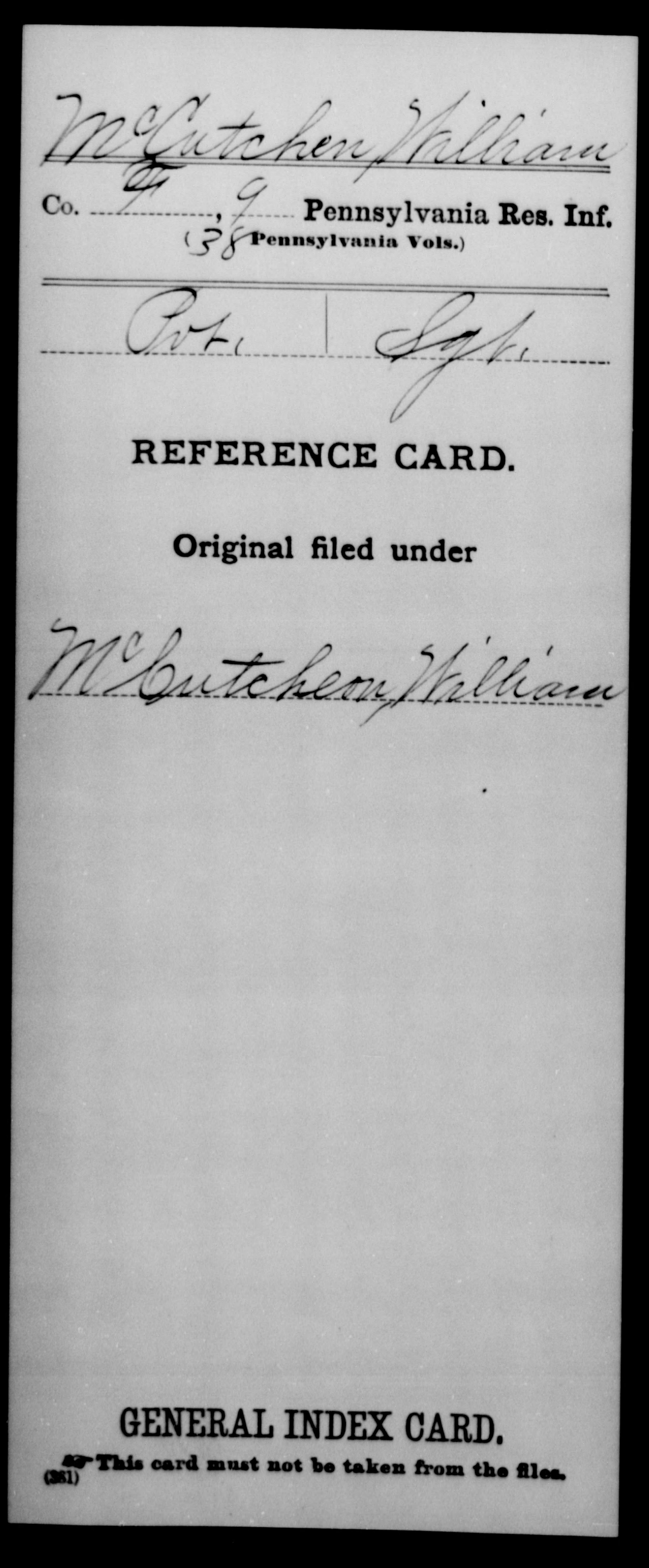
Documented example of the surname "McCutchen"

McCutchen is a surname. Notable people with the surname include:

- Andrew McCutchen (born 1986), American baseball player
- Daniel McCutchen (born 1982), American baseball player
- Monty McCutchen (born 1966), American basketball referee

== Places ==
- McCutchenville, Ohio

== See also ==
- McCutcheon (disambiguation)
