= McCutchan =

McCutchan is a surname. Notable people with the surname include:

- Robert Guy McCutchan (1877–1958), American hymnologist
- Arad McCutchan (1912–1993), American basketball coach
- Eric McCutchan (1913–1991), Australian rules football administrator

== See also ==
- McCutcheon (disambiguation)
