= Coolidge Reagan Foundation =

American conservative organization

The Coolidge Reagan Foundation is a conservative nonprofit organization and First Amendment watchdog. The group has filed legal complaints against Democratic campaigns and candidates, including Hillary Clinton, Bernie Sanders, and Zohran Mamdani.

== Leadership ==
Campaign finance lawyer Dan Backer is the foundation's president, while Republican donor Shaun McCutcheon is chairman. As of 2022, attorney Paul Kamenar is a member of the group's advisory board.

== History ==
In 2018, the foundation filed an administrative complaint with the Federal Election Commission against Hillary Clinton's 2016 presidential campaign and the Democratic National Committee, accusing them of misreporting payments made to the law firm Perkins Coie to obscure spending related to opposition research on Donald Trump's alleged ties to Russia. In 2022, Clinton and the DNC agreed to pay a $113,000 fine to settle the FEC investigation.

In 2019, a foundation complaint alleged that Rep. Alexandria Ocasio-Cortez illegally paid her then-boyfriend, digital marketing consultant Riley Roberts, during her 2017 congressional campaign. That same year, the group accused Sen. Bernie Sanders' presidential campaign of breaking federal law by hiring foreign nationals, leading to the Sanders campaign paying a $15,000 fine.

In April 2025, the Washington Examiner reported that the foundation filed a complaint with the FEC against Rep. Jasmine Crockett over alleged campaign finance law violations.

In October 2025, the foundation accused New York City mayoral candidate Zohran Mamdani of illegally accepting foreign contributions. After the group filed two criminal complaints against Mamdani, his campaign returned $9,000 in foreign donations from 67 overseas donors.
