= John McCutcheon (New Jersey politician) =

American politician

John McCutcheon (March 6, 1879 – September 16, 1942) was the New Jersey State Comptroller and the Passaic County Clerk.

== Biography ==
He was born on March 6, 1879, in Paterson, New Jersey. He was the Passaic County Clerk when he ran for New Jersey State Comptroller in 1929. He died on September 16, 1942, in a car accident.
