= Haskell, New Jersey =

Populated place in Passaic County, New Jersey, US

- Unincorporated community
- Aerial view of Haskell (2026)

- Haskell's location in Passaic County (Inset: Passaic County in New Jersey) Haskell, New Jersey (New Jersey) Haskell, New Jersey (the United States)
- Coordinates: 41°01′42″N 74°17′46″W
- Country: United States
- State: New Jersey
- County: Passaic
- Elevation: 230 ft (70 m)

Population (2010 census)
  - Total: 4,942
- Time zone: UTC−05:00 (Eastern Time Zone)
  - Summer (DST): UTC−04:00 (Eastern daylight time)
- ZIP Code: 07420
- GNIS feature ID: 0876987

Haskell is an unincorporated community located within Wanaque Borough, in Passaic County, in the U.S. state of New Jersey. Haskell was formed in 1898 as a company town for a smokeless powder mill of the Laflin & Rand Powder Company. The town was named for Laflin & Rand company president Jonathan Haskell. The Haskell powder mill manufactured the W.A. .30 caliber smokeless powder used in United States Army service rifles until 1908. Laflin & Rand was purchased by DuPont in 1902, suffered from an explosion caused by sabotage in World War I, and the powder mill ceased operations in 1926. The area is served by the United States Postal Service as part of ZIP Code 07420. The community is located in suburban Northern New Jersey.

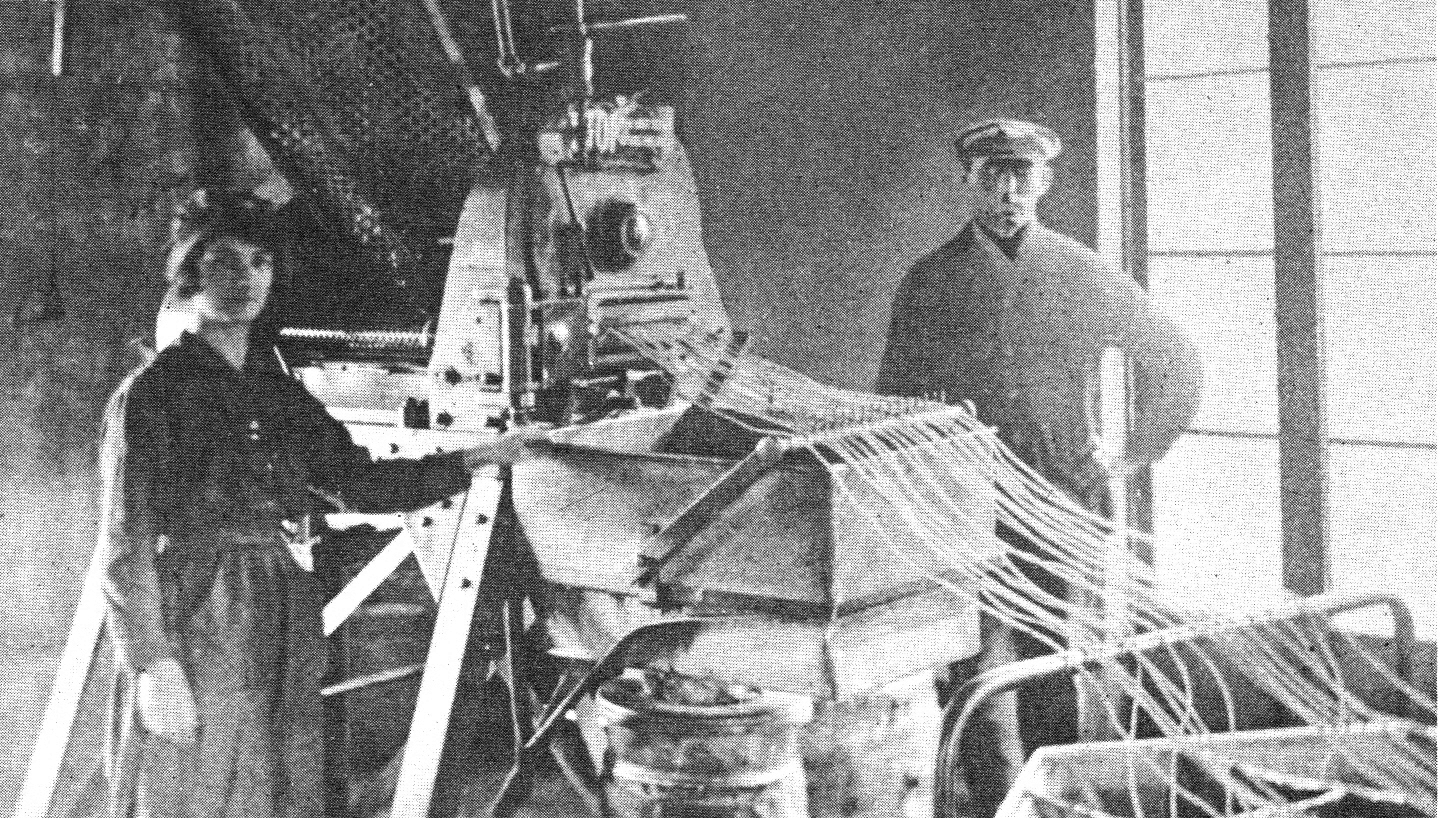
Manufacturing explosives during World War I at DuPont factory in Haskell

As of the 2010 United States census, the population for ZIP Code Tabulation Area 07420 was 4,942.

== Points of interest ==
Elks Camp Moore is an Elks accredited summer overnight camp for children with special needs. The camp is located high on top of a mountain overlooking Route 287, bordering both Haskell and Wanaque. Admission is free for campers, and the camp is funded in part by local New Jersey Elks lodges.

Back Beach Park is a 27-acre (11 ha) recreational park located in Haskell, that features various sports fields and hiking trails. Completed at a cost o $290,000 on and purchased in the early 1980, a took a decade to complete the park amid environmental challenges. Accessible trails include the Wanaque Ridge, which overlooks the town at its peak, as well as the Indian Hills Trail, which connects to the Ramapo Valley County Reservation in Mahwah.

== Notable people ==
People who were born in, residents of, or otherwise closely associated with Haskell include:

- Loretta Ford (1920–2025), nurse who was the co-founder of the first nurse practitioner program
- Bill Palatucci, (born 1958), attorney who is a member of the Republican National Committee and the New Jersey Apportionment Commission, and headed selection of staff for the first presidential transition of Donald Trump.
