= Bill Palatucci =

New Jersey attorney and politician

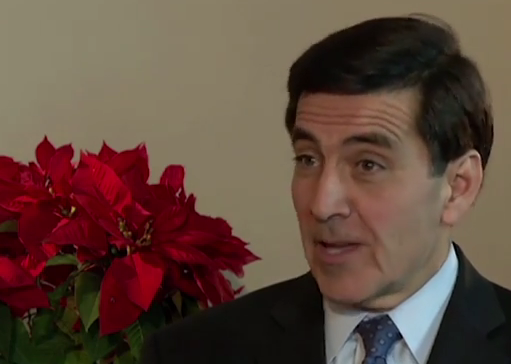

Republican National Committeeman from New Jersey
- Incumbent
- Assumed office 2010 Serving with Virginia E. Haines
- Preceded by: David Norcross

Personal details
- Born: 1958 (age 67–68) Haskell, New Jersey
- Party: Republican
- Spouse: Laura Palatucci
- Education: Rutgers University (BA); Seton Hall University (JD)
- Profession: Lawyer

William J. Palatucci (born 1958) is an American attorney and Republican National Committeeman. Palatucci was the White House Transition Coordinator and General Counsel for the 2016 presidential transition of Donald Trump until terminated on November 11, 2016.

Palatucci has served as the Finance Chairman of the New Jersey Republican State Committee and acted as a senior advisor for the 2000 presidential campaign of George W. Bush. He has also worked for Presidents Ronald Reagan and George H. W. Bush. He retains a close personal and professional association with Governor Chris Christie, serving as the Chairman of Christie's 2013 re-election campaign and co-chair of his 2010 and 2014 Inaugural Committees. He serves as counsel to the Leadership Matters for America PAC.

Palatucci is currently a partner at the law firm McCarter & English. Co-creating The Battling Bills with William J. Pascrell, Palatucci was nominated for Outstanding Talk Program Series at the 2005 Mid-Atlantic Emmy Awards. Palatucci currently serves on the National Advisory Board of the Heldrich Center for Workforce Development at Rutgers University.

In 2023, Palatucci, who has been a longtime RNC member and Trump skeptic pledged his support for RNC Chair candidate attorney Harmeet Dhillon.

== Early life and education ==
Palatucci was born in New Jersey to an Italian Catholic family of five children. Next door to their family home, his father operated Frank's Tavern in the Haskell section of Wanaque Borough, New Jersey. During World War II, Frank Palatucci chaired the ration board of Pompton Lakes, New Jersey. Bill has attributed his Republican ideals to watching Crossfire with his father and observing the blue-collar patrons of his father's bar.

Following a speech at Rutgers University in 1980, then-senior Bill Palatucci became a volunteer to then-candidate Tom Kean and began chauffeuring him. After serving as Kean's reelection executive director for the 1985 gubernatorial election, Bill earned his J.D. from the Seton Hall University School of Law in 1989.

== Career ==
=== Politics and law ===
Bill Palatucci's relationship as Chris Christie's "right hand" began with joint work on Christine Todd Whiman's unsuccessful campaign in the 1990 United States Senate election in New Jersey, continuing with Christie recruiting Palatucci to his law firm Dughi & Hewit in 1993. Leading its government affairs practice, Palatucci became a partner of the firm in 2001. Their close relationship has been emphasized by Christie's frequent hugging of Palatucci, despite the latter's aversion to being touched. During the 1992 United States presidential election, Palatucci served as executive-director of the Bush-Quayle campaign in New Jersey, unsuccessful at the state and national levels. In 2002, Palatucci's recommendation to Karl Rove, Senior Advisor to then-President George W. Bush, supported Christie being nominated to serve as United States Attorney for the District of New Jersey. Palatucci served as chairman of Christie's successful 2013 reelection campaign for Governor of New Jersey.

In November 2010, Palatucci was nominated to serve on the New Jersey Apportionment Commission, redrawing legislative and congressional districts based on the demographic information of the 2010 United States census. From 2005 to 2008, Palatucci served as Chairman of Westfield, New Jersey's Recreation Commission.

Among his significant donations to political campaigns, Palatucci has generally supported Republican candidates running for New Jersey and federal offices. In 2010, Palatucci was elected to the Republican National Committee.

In August 2020, following eight years working at Gibbons P.C., Palatucci joined the law firm McCarter & English.

=== RNC and Trump ===
During the 2016 Republican National Convention, Palatucci was one of four informally designated "whips" on the party's rules committee who had been tapped by the Donald Trump campaign to quash a possible insurrection by the Never Trump movement. With Chris Christie initially leading the 2016 presidential transition of Donald Trump, Palatucci served as White House Transition Coordinator and General Counsel until both were terminated on November 11, 2016. In 2023, Palatucci, who has been a longtime RNC member and Trump skeptic commented on the attempts to remove Trump-appointed RNC Chair Ronna McDaniel stating it is difficult to remove a party chair, however “it’s not over until it’s over.” He pledged his support for RNC Chair candidate attorney Harmeet Dhillon.

=== Halfway home controversy ===
Palatucci served as Senior Vice President and General Counsel for Public Affairs at Community Education Centers (CEC), a nonprofit organization operating halfway homes to reintegrate those with criminal backgrounds through partially supervised housing. Leveraging his close relationship with then-governor Chris Christie, Palatucci successfully lobbied the state to provide financial aid and divert inmates from public prisons, despite lacking statutory authority. The scheme involved CEC donating to politicians like Essex County Executive Joe DiVincenzo, convincing them to award government contracts to its non-profit affiliate Education and Health Centers of America (EHCA) in avoidance of New Jersey's "pay-to-play" regulations. In 2010, CEC's political contributions were at $110,000. A 2012 lawsuit filed by two law enforcement unions alleged that CEC placed inmates at risk of violence and drug use.

In 2011, New Jersey's state comptroller issued a report highlighting that about half of the state's $62M half-way home contracts were held by EHCA. Avoiding mandates that state-funded halfway homes be operated by non-profits, contracts awarded to EHCA had their financial returns diverted to CEC executives.

An investigation by The New York Times connected Palatucci's lobbying for CEC to Christie's 2010 state budget increasing funding for halfway homes by $3.1 million to $64.6 million. Following this media criticism, Palatucci stepped down from CEC in 2012.

On May 18, 2009, after only two days at Essex County's CEC-operated Delaney Hall, Derek West Harris was murdered by three other inmates. The state was criticized for sentencing one of the killers to life in prison, while clearing Delaney Hall officials of any wrongdoing despite the gang-controlled environment fostering violence.

== Personal life ==
Palatucci is married and has three daughters. Palatucci's wife, Laura, supported Rudy Giuliani's failed bid in the 2008 Republican Party presidential primaries.

From 2015 to 2021, Palatucci served on the Seton Hall University School of Law's Board of Visitors. He is currently a member of the National Advisory Board of the Heldrich Center for Workforce Development at Rutgers University.

=== Awards and recognition ===
- From 2011 through 2017, Palatucci was named one of the "100 Most Powerful People in New Jersey Business" by NJBIZ magazine
- In 2014, Seton Hall University's School of Law named Palatucci as a "Distinguished Alumnus"
- In 2015, Palatucci received the "Good Guy Award" from the Women's Political Caucus of New Jersey

== Sources ==
Governor Tom Kean: From the New Jersey Statehouse to the 911 Commission . Felzenbert, Alvin S., Hardcover – Illustrated, June 7, 2006. ISBN 0813537991
