= Passaic County, New Jersey =

County in New Jersey, United States

- County
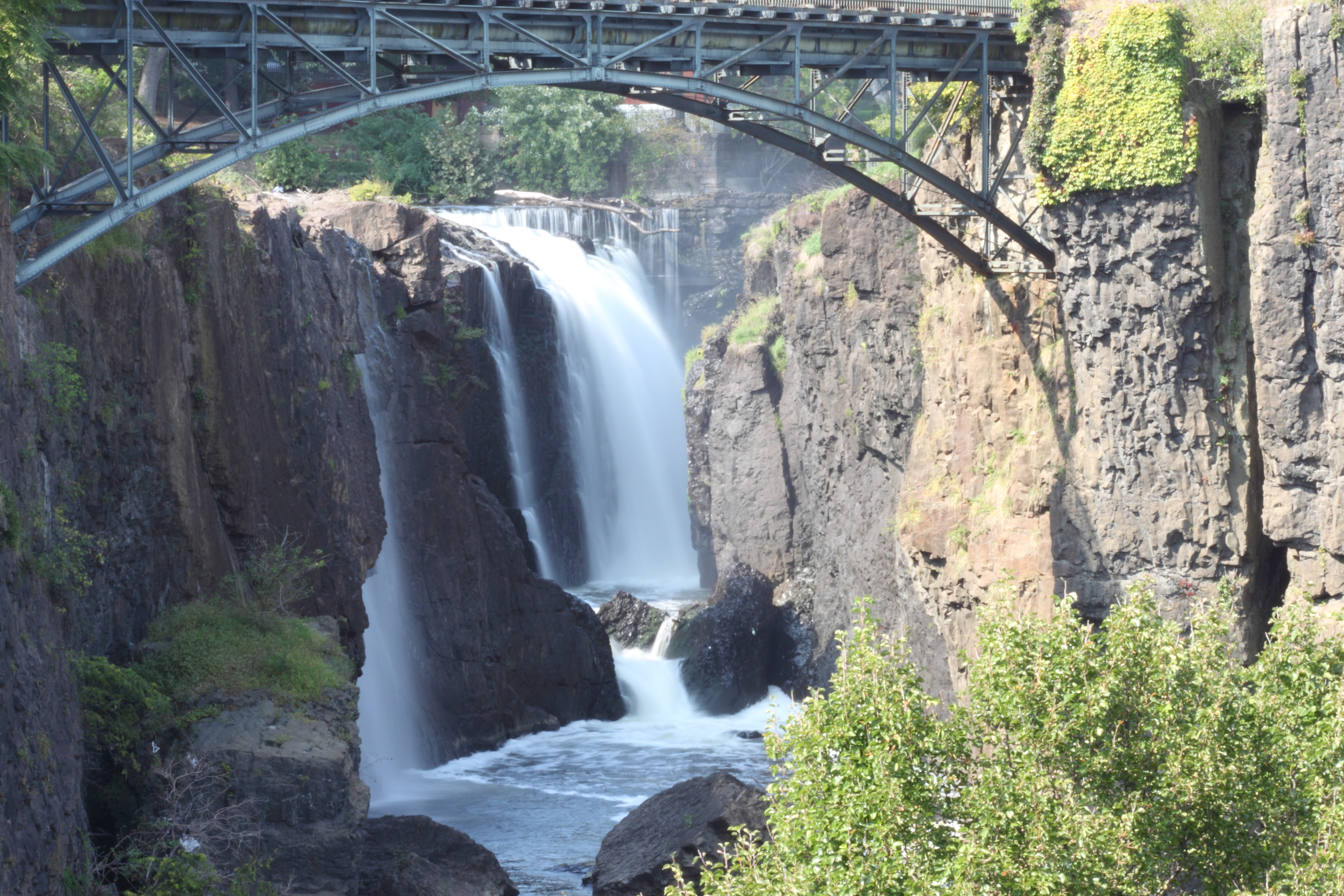
- The Great Falls of the Passaic River in Paterson

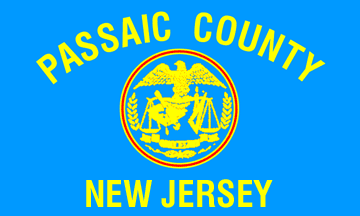
- Flag Seal

- Location within the U.S. state of New Jersey
- Interactive map of Passaic County, New Jersey
- Coordinates: 41.03°N 74.30°W
- Country: United States
- State: New Jersey
- Founded: February 7, 1837
- Named for: "Pasaeck" (Lenape word meaning "valley")
- Seat: Paterson
- Largest municipality: Paterson (population); West Milford (area)

Government
  - Commissioner Director: Cassandra "Sandi" Lazzara (D, term ends December 31, 2026)

Area
  - Total: 198.39 sq mi (513.8 km^{2})
  - Land: 186.01 sq mi (481.8 km^{2})
  - Water: 12.38 sq mi (32.1 km^{2}) 6.2%

Population (2020)
  - Total: 524,118 ▲
  - Estimate (2025): 531,624
  - Density: 2,817.7/sq mi (1,087.9/km^{2})
- Time zone: UTC−5 (Eastern)
  - Summer (DST): UTC−4 (EDT)
- Congressional districts: 5th, 9th, 11th
- Website: passaiccountynj.org

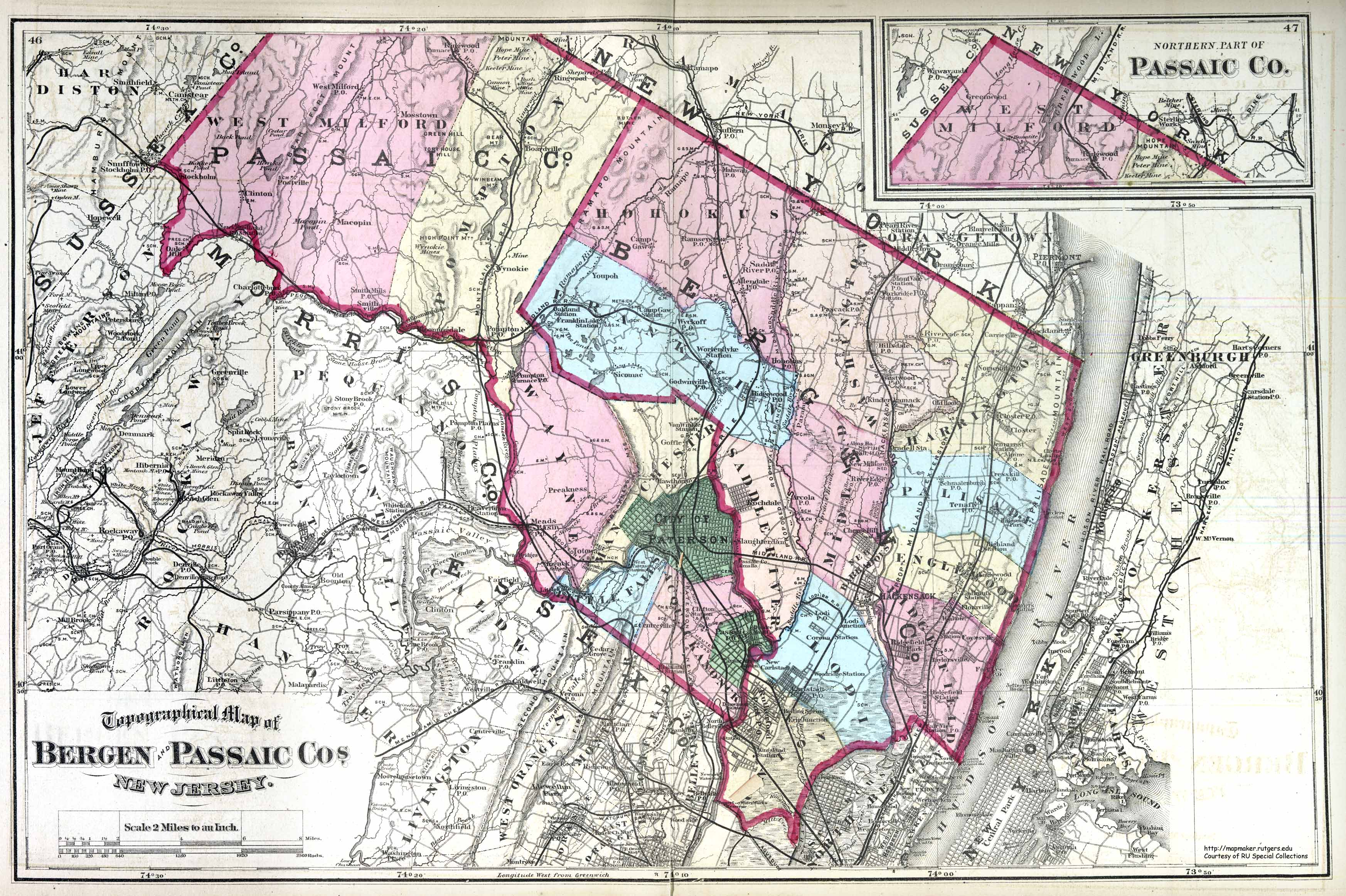
Bergen and Passaic counties, 1872

Passaic County (/pəˈseɪ.ɪk/ pə-SAY-ik or locally /pəˈseɪk/ pə-SAYK) is a county in the U.S. state of New Jersey that is part of the New York metropolitan area. As of the 2020 United States census, the county was the state's eighth-most-populous county, with a population of 524,118, its highest decennial count ever and an increase of 22,892 (+4.6%) from the 2010 census count of 501,226, which in turn reflected an increase of 12,177 (+2.5%) from the 489,049 counted in the 2000 census. The United States Census Bureau's Population Estimates Program estimated a 2025 population of 531,624, an increase of 7,506 (+1.4%) from the 2020 decennial census. The county is part of the North Jersey region of the state.

The most populous place in Passaic County is Paterson, the county seat, with 159,732 residents at the 2020 Census, more than 30% of the county's population, while West Milford covered 80.32 square miles (208.0 km^{2}), the largest total area of any municipality and more than 40% of the county's area.

== History ==
=== Etymology ===
Passaic County was created on February 7, 1837, from portions of Bergen and Essex counties. The county derives its name from "Pasaeck", which is a native Lenape word meaning "valley".

== Geography and climate ==
In recent years, average temperatures in the county seat of Paterson have ranged from a low of 19 °F (−7 °C) in January to a high of 86 °F (30 °C) in July, although a record low of −11 °F (−24 °C) was recorded in January 1961 and a record high of 105 °F (41 °C) was recorded in September 1953. Average monthly precipitation ranged from 2.86 inches (73 mm) in February to 4.78 inches (121 mm) in September. The county has a humid continental climate which is hot-summer (Dfa) except in higher areas to the north where it is warm-summer (Dfb).

The landscape of Passaic County, near the north edge of New Jersey, spans some hilly areas and has dozens of lakes. The county covers a region about 30 × 20 miles wide (48 × 32 km). The region is split by major roads, including portions of Interstate 287 and Interstate 80, near Paterson. The Garden State Parkway cuts across the southern end, near Clifton. The Passaic River winds northeast past Totowa into Paterson, where the river then turns south to Passaic, on the way to Newark, further south.

The highest point is any one of six areas on Bearfort Ridge in West Milford at approximately 1,480 feet (450 m) above sea level. The lowest elevation is approximately 20 feet (6.1 m) along the Passaic River in Clifton. The southeastern, more populous half of the county is either flat, along the Passaic and Pompton Rivers, or mildly hilly, among the Watchung Mountains. The northwestern section is rugged and mountainous, part of the New Jersey Highlands.

According to the U.S. Census Bureau, as of the 2020 Census, the county had a total area of 198.39 square miles (513.8 km^{2}), of which 186.01 square miles (481.8 km^{2}) was land (93.8%) and 12.38 square miles (32.1 km^{2}) was water (6.2%).

Paterson, New Jersey

Climate chart (precipitation, max. and min. temperature)
J	F	M	A	M	J	J	A	S	O	N	D
3.5 38 19	2.8 41 22	4.1 50 30	4.3 62 40	4.2 72 50	4.4 81 60	4.5 86 65	3.8 84 63	4.7 76 55	4.3 64 42	4 54 34	4 43 25
- █ Average max. and min. temperatures in °F
- █ Precipitation totals in inches
- Source: The Weather Channel
Metric conversion
J	F	M	A	M	J	J	A	S	O	N	D
89 3 −7	71 5 −6	104 10 −1	109 17 4	107 22 10	112 27 16	114 30 18	97 29 17	119 24 13	109 18 6	102 12 1	102 6 −4
- █ Average max. and min. temperatures in °C
- █ Precipitation totals in mm

== Demographics ==
Historical population
Census	Pop.	Note	%±
1840	16,734		—
1850	22,569		34.9%
1860	29,013		28.6%
1870	46,416		60.0%
1880	68,860		48.4%
1890	105,046		52.6%
1900	155,202		47.7%
1910	215,902		39.1%
1920	259,174		20.0%
1930	302,129		16.6%
1940	309,353		2.4%
1950	337,093		9.0%
1960	406,618		20.6%
1970	460,782		13.3%
1980	447,585		−2.9%
1990	453,060		1.2%
2000	489,049		7.9%
2010	501,226		2.5%
2020	524,118		4.6%
2025 (est.)	531,624		1.4%
Historical sources: 1790-1990; 1970-2010 2000; 2010 2000-2010 2020

The county hosts one of the largest population of Circassian Americans. Nart Hapatsha, of Circassian origin, became the first Muslim undersheriff of the county and swore an oath to the Quran.

=== 2020 census ===
As of the 2020 census, the county had 524,118 people, 177,075 households, and 120,593 families. The population density was 2,817.8 inhabitants per square mile (1,088.0/km^{2}). There were 185,367 housing units at an average density of 996.59 per square mile (384.8/km^{2}).

The racial makeup of the county was 43.8% White, 11.0% Black or African American, 1.2% American Indian and Alaska Native, 5.9% Asian, <0.1% Native Hawaiian and Pacific Islander, 25.7% from some other race, and 12.3% from two or more races. Hispanic or Latino residents of any race comprised 42.7% of the population.

The median age was 37.9 years. 23.0% of residents were under the age of 18 and 14.9% were 65 years of age or older. For every 100 females there were 93.4 males, and for every 100 females age 18 and over there were 90.4 males age 18 and over.

There were 177,075 households in the county, of which 36.2% had children under the age of 18 living in them. Of all households, 45.9% were married-couple households, 17.4% were households with a male householder and no spouse or partner present, and 30.3% were households with a female householder and no spouse or partner present. About 23.0% of all households were made up of individuals and 10.3% had someone living alone who was 65 years of age or older.

There were 185,367 housing units, of which 4.5% were vacant. Among occupied housing units, 51.0% were owner-occupied and 49.0% were renter-occupied. The homeowner vacancy rate was 1.1% and the rental vacancy rate was 3.5%.

97.2% of residents lived in urban areas, while 2.8% lived in rural areas.

The county's median household income was $77,040, and the median family income was $81,873. About 13.4% of the population were below the poverty line, including 24.7% of those under age 18 and 11.6% of those age 65 or over.

=== Racial and ethnic composition ===
Passaic County, New Jersey – Racial and ethnic composition Note: the US Census treats Hispanic/Latino as an ethnic category. This table excludes Latinos from the racial categories and assigns them to a separate category. Hispanics/Latinos may be of any race.
Race / Ethnicity (NH = Non-Hispanic)	Pop 1980	Pop 1990	Pop 2000	Pop 2010	Pop 2020	% 1980	% 1990	% 2000	% 2010	% 2020
White alone (NH)	320,505	284,276	251,687	227,144	203,542	71.61%	62.75%	51.46%	45.32%	38.84%
Black or African American alone (NH)	57,202	57,746	60,528	55,480	51,859	12.78%	12.75%	12.38%	11.07%	9.89%
Native American or Alaska Native alone (NH)	659	739	802	769	688	0.15%	0.16%	0.16%	0.15%	0.13%
Asian alone (NH)	4,655	11,208	17,747	24,556	30,209	1.04%	2.47%	3.63%	4.90%	5.76%
Native Hawaiian or Pacific Islander alone (NH)	x	x	94	53	52	x	x	0.02%	0.01%	0.01%
Other race alone (NH)	2,441	999	1,185	1,368	3,514	0.55%	0.22%	0.24%	0.27%	0.67%
Mixed race or Multiracial (NH)	x	x	10,514	6,179	10,224	x	x	2.15%	1.23%	1.95%
Hispanic or Latino (any race)	62,123	98,092	146,492	185,677	224,030	13.88%	21.65%	29.95%	37.04%	42.74%
Total	447,585	453,060	489,049	501,226	524,118	100.00%	100.00%	100.00%	100.00%	100.00%

=== 2010 census ===
The 2010 United States census counted 501,226 people, 166,785 households, and 120,919 families in the county. The population density was 2,715.3 per square mile (1,048.4/km^{2}). There were 175,966 housing units at an average density of 953.3 per square mile (368.1/km^{2}). The racial makeup was 62.65% (314,001) White, 12.83% (64,295) Black or African American, 0.67% (3,348) Native American, 5.01% (25,092) Asian, 0.03% (156) Pacific Islander, 15.11% (75,735) from other races, and 3.71% (18,599) from two or more races. Hispanic or Latino of any race were 37.04% (185,677) of the population.

Of the 166,785 households, 34.5% had children under the age of 18; 48.7% were married couples living together; 17.5% had a female householder with no husband present and 27.5% were non-families. Of all households, 22.6% were made up of individuals and 9.4% had someone living alone who was 65 years of age or older. The average household size was 2.94 and the average family size was 3.45.

24.9% of the population were under the age of 18, 10.3% from 18 to 24, 27.1% from 25 to 44, 25.7% from 45 to 64, and 12% who were 65 years of age or older. The median age was 36.1 years. For every 100 females, the population had 94.2 males. For every 100 females ages 18 and older there were 91.1 males.

Same-sex couples headed one in 149 households in 2010.

=== 2000 census ===
As of the 2000 United States census there were 489,049 people, 163,856 households, and 119,614 families residing in the county. The population density was 2,639 inhabitants per square mile (1,019/km^{2}). There were 170,048 housing units at an average density of 918 per square mile (354/km^{2}). The racial makeup of the county was 62.32% White, 13.22% Black or African American, 0.44% Native American, 3.69% Asian, 0.04% Pacific Islander, 16.24% from other races, and 4.05% from two or more races. 29.95% of the population were Hispanic or Latino of any race. Among those who reported their ancestry, 16.6% were of Italian, 9.5% Irish, 8.1% German and 6.2% Polish ancestry according to Census 2000.

There were 163,856 households, out of which 35.60% had children under the age of 18 living with them, 51.50% were married couples living together, 16.00% had a female householder with no husband present, and 27.00% were non-families. 22.20% of all households were made up of individuals, and 9.50% had someone living alone who was 65 years of age or older. The average household size was 2.92 and the average family size was 3.42.

In the county, the population was spread out, with 26.10% under the age of 18, 9.30% from 18 to 24, 31.30% from 25 to 44, 21.30% from 45 to 64, and 12.10% who were 65 years of age or older. The median age was 35 years. For every 100 females, there were 94.00 males. For every 100 females age 18 and over, there were 90.80 males.

The median income for a household in the county was $49,210, and the median income for a family was $56,054. Males had a median income of $38,740 versus $29,954 for females. The per capita income for the county was $21,370. About 9.40% of families and 12.30% of the population were below the poverty line, including 17.30% of those under age 18 and 9.20% of those age 65 or over.

== Government ==
=== County government ===
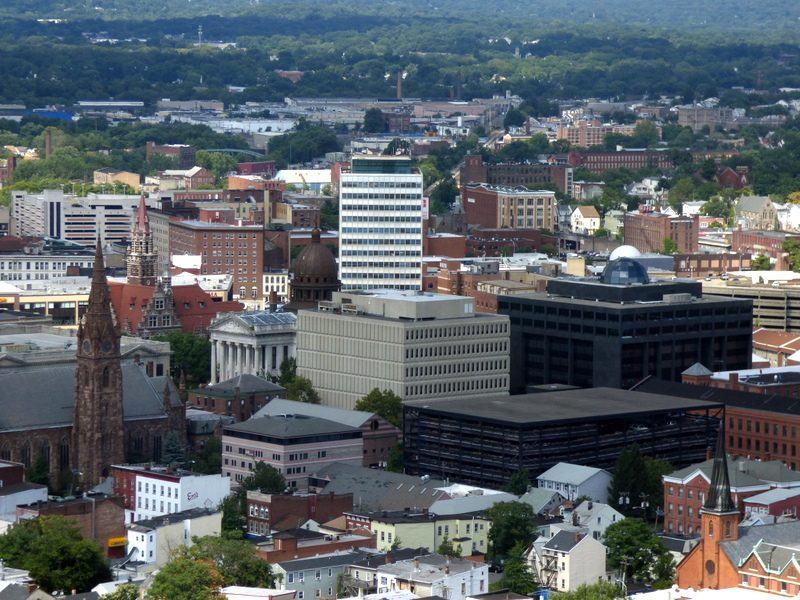
The Passaic County Court House and Administration Building complex (center) is located in Downtown Paterson.

The Passaic County Court House and Administration Building complex is located at the county seat in Paterson. In Passaic County's commission form of government, the Board of County Commissioners discharges both executive and legislative responsibilities. Seven Commissioners are elected at-large for three-year terms on a staggered basis. A Director and Deputy Director are elected from among the seven Commissioners, at an annual reorganization meeting in January. Passaic County operates through six standing committees of the Board of County Commissioners. They are: Administration & Finance; Health, Education and Community Affairs; Public Works and Buildings & Grounds; Law & Public Safety; Human Services and Planning and Economic Development. The Commissioners also appoint individuals to departments, agencies, boards, and commissions for the effective administration of the county government. In 2016, commissioners were paid $28,500, and the director was paid an annual salary of $29,500. The Commissioners select a County Administrator, who, in the role of chief administrative officer, supervises the day-to-day operation of the county government and its departments; County counsel Matthew Jordan took office as administrator in 2022, succeeding Anthony J. DeNova III, who had served as administrator for 19 years.

As of 2026, Passaic County's Commissioners are: Director Cassandra "Sandi" Lazzara (D), Little Falls, term as commissioner ends December 31, 2027; term as director ends 2026), Deputy Director Orlando Cruz (D, Paterson, term as commissioner and as deputy director ends 2026), Rodney DeVore (D, Paterson, 2027), Bruce James (D, Clifton, 2026) Michael Ramaglia (D, West Milford, 2028), Christina Schratz (D, Passaic, 2028) and Nick Veliky (D, Clifton, appointed to a term ending in 2027).

In July 2026, Nick Veliky was appointed to fill the seat expiring in December 2027 that had been held by John Bartlett, until his resignation to serve with the Gateway Development Commission as its general counsel. Veliky will serve on an interim basis until the November 2026 general election, when voters will select a candidate to serve the balance of the term of office.

Democrats have been in the majority since winning two of three seats up for election in the 1997 general election. Republicans have not won a seat on the county board since Nicolino Gallo was elected in 2021. In March 2023, the commission swore Orlando Cruz, the president of the Greater Paterson Chamber of Commerce (as well as its counterpart in neighboring Wayne), into office to replace retiring commissioner T.J. Best, who resigned at the beginning of the month to spend time with family members down in Georgia.

Constitutional officers, elected on a countywide basis, are County Clerk Danielle Ireland-Imhof (D, Hawthorne, 2028), Sheriff Thomas Adamo (D, Wayne, 2027) and Surrogate Zoila S. Cassanova (D, Wayne, 2026).

The Passaic County Prosecutor is Camelia M. Valdes of Bloomingdale, who was appointed by Governor of New Jersey Jon S. Corzine in May 2009, and renominated by Governor Chris Christie in June 2015. Passaic County constitutes Vicinage 11 of the New Jersey Superior Court and is seated at the Passaic County Court House in Paterson; the Assignment Judge for Vicinage 11 is Ernest M. Caposela. Law enforcement at the county level is provided by the Passaic County Sheriff's Office and Passaic County Prosecutor's Office, which occasionally assist local police forces with investigations and patrol efforts.

=== Federal representatives ===
Three Congressional Districts cover the county, with most of the northern portion of the county in the 5th District, most of the southern portion of the county in the 9th District, and the central portion of the county in the 11th District. For the 119th United States Congress, New Jersey's 5th congressional district is represented by Josh Gottheimer (D, Wyckoff). For the 119th United States Congress, New Jersey's 9th congressional district is represented by Nellie Pou (D, North Haledon) For the 119th United States Congress, New Jersey's 11th congressional district is represented by Analilia Mejia (D, Glen Ridge) who was elected in a 2026 special election to serve for the remainder of the Congress following the resignation Mikie Sherrill (D, Montclair), who was elected Governor of New Jersey in 2025.

=== State representatives ===
The 16 municipalities of Passaic County are represented by seven separate legislative districts.

District	Senator	Assembly	Municipalities
25th	Anthony M. Bucco (R)	Aura Dunn (R) Marisa Sweeney (D)	West Milford. The remainder of this district covers portions of Morris County.
26th	Joseph Pennacchio (R)	Brian Bergen (R) Jay Webber (R)	Bloomingdale, Pompton Lakes, Ringwood, and Wanaque. The remainder of this district covers portions of Morris County.
27th	John F. McKeon (D)	Rosaura Bagoile (D) Alixon Collazos-Gill (D)	Clifton. The remainder of this district covers portions of Essex County.
35th	Benjie E. Wimberly (D)	Al Abdelaziz (D) Kenyatta Stewart (D)	Haledon, North Haledon, Paterson, and Prospect Park. The remainder of this district covers portions of Bergen County.
36th	Paul Sarlo (D)	Gary Schaer (D) Clinton Calabrese (D)	Passaic. The remainder of this district covers portions of Bergen County.
40th	Kristin Corrado (R)	Al Barlas (R) Christopher DePhillips (R)	Hawthorne, Little Falls, Totowa, Wayne, and Woodland Park. The remainder of this district includes portions of Bergen and Essex counties.

=== Highlands protection ===
In 2004, the New Jersey Legislature passed the Highlands Water Protection and Planning Act, which regulates the New Jersey Highlands region. The northwestern area of the county, comprising the municipalities of Bloomingdale, Pompton Lakes, Ringwood, Wanaque and West Milford, was included in the highlands preservation area and is subject to the rules of the act and the Highlands Water Protection and Planning Council, a division of the New Jersey Department of Environmental Protection. Some of the territory in the protected region is classified as being in the highlands preservation area, and thus subject to additional rules.

=== Law enforcement ===
The Passaic County Sheriff's Office provides law enforcement functions throughout the entirety of the county, plus unincorporated county area police patrol, detective, crime scene investigation, SWAT, K-9 function, operation of the Passaic County Jail, and the security of all county-owned facilities, including the Passaic County Court House and Administration Building. All of the incorporated municipalities within the county also have separate local police departments, almost always exclusively providing law enforcement operations within their physical boundaries.

In January 2024, Sheriff Richard Berdnik committed suicide inside a Turkish restaurant.

== Transportation ==
=== Public transportation ===
Passaic County has a number of NJ Transit stations, including Montclair State University, Little Falls, Wayne/Route 23, and Mountain View on the Montclair-Boonton Line. The “Main Line” corridor also runs through the county and includes the following stations: Hawthorne, Paterson, Clifton, Passaic, and Delawanna.

=== Roads and highways ===
Passaic County has numerous important roads that travel within its borders:

Major county roads that pass through include: CR 502 (only in Wayne), CR 504, CR 509 CR 511 and CR 513.

Route 19 runs entirely through the county, connecting the Garden State Parkway with Interstate 80 and Paterson. Both Route 20 and Route 21 run along the eastern border alongside the Passaic River. Route 23 runs through the western section of the county, while both Route 3 and Route 161 go through Clifton. Route 62 also runs passes through entirely in Totowa. U.S. Route 202 runs roughly north–south only in Wayne Township while U.S. Route 46 traverses east–west.

Interstate 80 (Bergen-Passaic Expressway) runs east–west through the county, while Interstate 287 passes through the mountainous sections of Passaic. The Garden State Parkway also runs through the county solely in Clifton.

== Politics ==
United States presidential election results for Passaic County, New Jersey
Year	Republican		Democratic		Third party(ies)	
Year	No.	%	No.	%	No.	%
1896	15,437	58.81%	9,280	35.36%	1,530	5.83%
1900	15,619	52.97%	12,892	43.73%	973	3.30%
1904	17,705	56.41%	11,532	36.74%	2,150	6.85%
1908	17,638	55.97%	11,960	37.95%	1,918	6.09%
1912	5,349	17.52%	10,810	35.41%	14,372	47.07%
1916	18,754	55.32%	13,340	39.35%	1,810	5.34%
1920	42,692	72.08%	11,873	20.05%	4,660	7.87%
1924	43,384	62.33%	11,644	16.73%	14,571	20.94%
1928	57,708	54.53%	47,167	44.57%	959	0.91%
1932	49,218	44.99%	54,576	49.88%	5,610	5.13%
1936	49,046	40.14%	71,384	58.42%	1,760	1.44%
1940	65,523	48.21%	69,880	51.42%	504	0.37%
1944	67,856	49.46%	68,737	50.11%	589	0.43%
1948	59,675	45.75%	60,147	46.11%	10,608	8.13%
1952	89,083	54.26%	70,727	43.08%	4,380	2.67%
1956	101,182	60.71%	61,859	37.11%	3,635	2.18%
1960	80,853	45.07%	90,950	50.70%	7,599	4.24%
1964	63,114	35.12%	113,919	63.39%	2,666	1.48%
1968	79,862	46.25%	74,442	43.12%	18,353	10.63%
1972	108,511	62.03%	62,302	35.62%	4,110	2.35%
1976	85,102	51.20%	76,194	45.84%	4,930	2.97%
1980	82,531	51.92%	61,486	38.68%	14,934	9.40%
1984	101,951	58.28%	69,590	39.78%	3,399	1.94%
1988	88,070	55.91%	66,254	42.06%	3,189	2.02%
1992	71,147	43.15%	70,030	42.47%	23,711	14.38%
1996	53,594	35.04%	85,879	56.15%	13,478	8.81%
2000	61,043	38.99%	90,324	57.69%	5,206	3.32%
2004	75,200	43.90%	94,962	55.43%	1,149	0.67%
2008	72,552	38.65%	113,257	60.34%	1,904	1.01%
2012	64,523	35.41%	115,926	63.62%	1,765	0.97%
2016	72,902	37.15%	116,759	59.50%	6,567	3.35%
2020	92,009	41.13%	129,097	57.71%	2,601	1.16%
2024	100,954	49.79%	95,156	46.93%	6,657	3.28%

Passaic County was historically a swing county, as it voted for the national winner all but twice (in 1976 and 1992) between 1920 and 1992. Since 1996, the county has leaned Democratic until recently, as Republicans have made significant gains in the country, especially in the more urban parts. In the 2016 presidential election, Democratic support declined to 59.5%, although nominee Hillary Clinton still won the county comfortably overall, and the 2020 presidential election saw Democratic support decline to 57.5% - a margin of 16.5% for former Vice President Joe Biden over Republican President Donald Trump, which was a slightly wider margin than the state as a whole. Passaic County's namesake municipality, the small city of Passaic, saw the biggest overall drop for Biden compared to Clinton among its municipalities, which helped Trump narrow the gap in the county overall in 2020 compared to 2016. This outcome was in correspondence with the rightward trend of the county in recent years, which was also seen in the 2021 gubernatorial election. Democratic governor Phil Murphy won the county by just a 4% margin, while winning statewide by 3.2%. This was far below his 22% margin in 2017, when he won statewide by 14%.

In the 2024 presidential election, Donald Trump flipped the county Republican, and most notably, its cities of Passaic and Clifton. The county voted to the right of the state, which voted for Democratic nominee Kamala Harris by 6%. Trump became the first Republican to win a presidential election in the county since George H. W. Bush in the 1992 presidential election. Democrat Andy Kim won the county by just 3% in the concurrent 2024 U.S. Senate election in New Jersey, even as he won statewide by 10%. A year later, Passaic County flipped blue in the 2025 gubernatorial election, where Mikie Sherrill won the county by 16% over Jack Ciattarelli, voting to the left of the state.

As of August 1, 2020, there were a total of 318,029 registered voters in Passaic County, of which 128,114 (40.3%) were registered as Democrats, 64,389 (20.3%) were registered as Republicans and 120,282 (37.8%) were registered as Unaffiliated. There were 5,244 (1.7%) voters registered to other parties. Among the county's 2010 Census population, 53.2% were registered to vote, including 70.8% of those ages 18 and over.

Senate Class 1 election results

United States Senate election results for Passaic County, New Jersey1
Year	Republican		Democratic		Third party(ies)	
Year	No.	%	No.	%	No.	%
2024	86,654	46.58%	91,719	49.30%	7,655	4.11%
2018	58,382	39.10%	86,242	57.75%	4,700	3.15%
2012	54,149	33.38%	105,286	64.91%	2,780	1.71%
2006	41,998	41.19%	58,333	57.20%	1,642	1.61%
2000	63,460	44.23%	75,378	52.53%	4,646	3.24%
1994	47,152	48.22%	48,067	49.16%	2,563	2.62%
1988	66,440	44.96%	77,827	52.66%	3,512	2.38%
1982	45,353	41.37%	61,397	56.00%	2,891	2.64%

Senate Class 2 election results

United States Senate election results for Passaic County, New Jersey2
Year	Republican		Democratic		Third party(ies)	
Year	No.	%	No.	%	No.	%
2020	80,827	36.97%	131,195	60.01%	6,593	3.02%
2014	32,612	37.64%	52,533	60.62%	1,508	1.74%
2013	25,263	39.86%	37,378	58.97%	744	1.17%
2008	59,556	36.33%	100,598	61.36%	3,798	2.32%
2002	39,822	41.96%	53,275	56.14%	1,806	1.90%
1996	57,090	41.79%	74,118	54.25%	5,407	3.96%
1990	43,867	50.69%	40,312	46.58%	2,357	2.72%
1984	59,468	36.42%	101,217	61.99%	2,606	1.60%

=== State elections ===
Governor election results

Gubernatorial election results for Passaic County, New Jersey
Year	Republican		Democratic		Third party(ies)	
Year	No.	%	No.	%	No.	%
2025	61,966	41.56%	86,053	57.71%	1,081	0.73%
2021	53,551	47.68%	57,812	51.47%	961	0.86%
2017	36,230	37.96%	57,415	60.15%	1,810	1.90%
2013	53,858	52.89%	46,825	45.99%	1,140	1.12%
2009	48,500	45.54%	57,010	53.54%	981	0.92%
2005	41,532	38.91%	61,803	57.90%	3,413	3.20%
2001	43,806	40.77%	62,390	58.07%	1,238	1.15%
1997	55,541	45.24%	60,256	49.08%	6,966	5.67%
1993	65,220	52.86%	55,086	44.64%	3,083	2.50%
1989	55,541	47.04%	60,256	51.03%	2,271	1.92%
1985	70,896	69.79%	29,263	28.81%	1,429	1.41%
1981	62,273	50.82%	58,573	47.80%	1,695	1.38%
1977	57,545	52.33%	49,223	44.76%	3,193	2.90%
1973	44,844	37.81%	71,673	60.42%	2,102	1.77%
1969	81,079	55.08%	61,816	41.99%	4,320	2.93%
1965	55,998	40.94%	78,193	57.17%	2,581	1.89%
1961	61,176	45.46%	72,175	53.63%	1,221	0.91%
1957	57,217	41.75%	75,643	55.19%	4,192	3.06%
1953	60,599	46.83%	65,852	50.89%	2,945	2.28%

== Municipalities ==
The 16 municipalities in Passaic County (with 2010 Census data for population, housing units and area in square miles) are: Other, unincorporated communities in the county are listed next to their parent municipality. Most of these areas are census-designated places (CDPs) that have been created by the United States Census Bureau for enumeration purposes within a Township. Other communities and enclaves that exist within a municipality are also listed next to the name.

Interactive map of municipalities in Passaic County.

Municipality	Mun. type	Pop.	Housing units	Total area	Water area	Land Area	Pop. density	Housing density	School district	Unincorporated communities / notes
Bloomingdale	borough	7,777	3,089	9.17	0.45	8.71	878.6	354.5	Butler (9–12) (S/R); Bloomingdale (K–8)	
Clifton	city	90,296	31,946	11.40	0.14	11.26	7,472.0	2,837.1	Clifton	
Haledon	borough	9,052	2,932	1.16	0.00	1.15	7,203.9	2,539.3	Manchester (9–12); Haledon (PK–8)	
Hawthorne	borough	19,637	7,756	3.36	0.03	3.33	5,635.3	2,326.0	Hawthorne	
Little Falls	township	13,360	4,925	2.81	0.07	2.74	5,276.2	1,800.5	Passaic Valley (9–12); Little Falls (K–8)	Great Notch CDP (3,289); Singac CDP (3,602)
North Haledon	borough	8,927	3,213	3.50	0.04	3.45	2,436.8	930.2	Manchester (9–12); North Haledon (PK–8)	
Passaic	city	70,537	20,432	3.24	0.10	3.15	22,179.6	6,494.2	Passaic	
Paterson	city	159,732	47,946	8.70	0.28	8.43	18,948.0	5,688.7	Paterson	
Pompton Lakes	borough	11,127	4,341	3.19	0.28	2.91	3,809.1	1,490.1	Pompton Lakes	
Prospect Park	borough	6,372	1,931	0.48	0.00	0.48	12,347.2	4,065.2	Manchester (9–12); Prospect Park (PK–8)	
Ringwood	borough	11,735	4,331	28.17	2.96	25.21	485.0	171.8	Lakeland (9–12); Ringwood (K–8)	
Totowa	borough	11,065	3,918	4.07	0.07	3.99	2,704.9	980.9	Passaic Valley (9–12); Totowa (PK–8)	
Wanaque	borough	11,317	4,184	9.25	1.26	7.99	1,391.2	523.7	Lakeland (9–12); Wanaque (PK–8)	Haskell
Wayne	township	54,838	19,768	25.17	1.45	23.73	2,306.0	833.1	Wayne	Packanack Lake CDP (6,261); Pines Lake CDP (3,033); Preakness CDP (18,487); William Paterson University of New Jersey CDP (1,417)
West Milford	township	24,862	10,419	80.32	5.23	75.09	344.3	138.8	West Milford	Cooper; Hewitt CDP (1,912); Macopin CDP (2,199); Newfoundland CDP (part; 1,145); Oak Ridge CDP (part; 10,996); Upper Greenwood Lake CDP (part; 3,687)
Woodland Park	borough	13,484	4,835	3.11	0.15	2.96	3,987.9	1,631.4	Passaic Valley (9–12); Woodland Park (K–8)	(formerly West; Paterson)
Passaic County	county	524,118	175,966	197.11	12.51	184.59	2,715.3	953.3		

=== Historic municipalities ===
- West Paterson Borough (renamed Woodland Park in 2009)

=== Other communities ===
- Montclair State University CDP (part; 2,180)

== Economy ==
The Bureau of Economic Analysis calculated that the county's gross domestic product was $20.5 billion in 2021, which was ranked 13th in the state and was a 4.8% increase from the prior year.

=== Corporation headquarters in Passaic County ===
- Toys "R" Us' former US corporate headquarters was in Wayne.
- Valley National Bank's corporate headquarters is in Wayne.
- Linens ‘n Things's headquarters office was in Clifton and employed 17,500 before closing in 2009.
- JVC has their US office in Wayne and employ approximately 19,040.

== Education ==
Tertiary:

- Passaic County Community College, founded in 1971, serves students from Passaic County at campuses in Paterson, Wanaque, Wayne, and Passaic.
- William Paterson University, established in 1855, is a public university located in Wayne.
- Montclair State University, founded in 1908, is a public university located in Montclair, as well as portions of Little Falls and Clifton.
- Passaic County Technical Institute, founded in 1975, serves grades 9–12 with a higher level vocational schooling system.

K-12 school districts:

- Clifton City School District
- Hawthorne Borough School District
- Passaic City School District
- Paterson City School District
- Pompton Lakes Borough School District
- Wayne Township School District
- West Milford Township School District

Secondary school districts:

- Lakeland Regional School District
- Passaic Valley Regional School District
- Passaic County Manchester Regional School District

Elementary/middle school districts:

- Bloomingdale Borough School District
- Haledon Borough School District
- Little Falls Township School District
- North Haledon Borough School District
- Prospect Park Borough School District
- Ringwood Borough School District
- Totowa Borough School District
- Wanaque Borough School District
- Woodland Park Borough School District

== Media ==
Passaic County is served by New York City-based commercial television & radio stations and New Jersey Network public television.

- The West Milford Messenger, community newspaper in West Milford area
- The Record, Suburban Trends and AIM West Milford, a weekly community newspaper

== Points of interest ==
- Dey Mansion, in Preakness, Wayne, served as Washington's Headquarters on several occasions during the American Revolutionary War.
- Garret Mountain Reservation in Paterson and Woodland Park is a National Natural Landmark covering 568 acres (230 ha).
- Paterson Great Falls National Historical Park in Paterson
- High Mountain Park Preserve in Wayne
- Hinchliffe Stadium in Paterson is a stadium with 7,000 seats that was used as a venue for Negro league baseball, and is the home of the New Jersey Jackals of the Frontier League. After 25 years at Yogi Berra Stadium on the campus of Montclair State University, the Jackals relocated to Hinchliffe Stadium for the 2023 season starting in May 2023.
- Lambert Castle in Paterson
- Long Pond Ironworks State Park in West Milford
- Paterson Museum, housed in the Rogers Locomotive and Machine Works in Paterson
- Ringwood State Park in Ringwood
- Skylands, the New Jersey State Botanical Garden in Ringwood, are formal gardens that are open to the public year-round. Originally constructed for Clarence MacKenzie Lewis in the 1920s, the entire property was acquired by the State of New Jersey in 1966 to form a State Botanical Garden covering 4,000-acre (16 km^{2}) which include a Lilac Garden, Magnolia Walk, the Wild Flower Garden, the Crab Apple Vista, an allée of 166 trees extending almost a half-mile, and the Perennial Garden.
- Yogi Berra Stadium in Little Falls - Located on the campus of Montclair State University, the stadium was home to the New Jersey Jackals until 2022, as well as Montclair State's baseball team. The stadium has a capacity of 5,000, with permanent seating of 3,784, and lawn seating, which holds an additional 1,500.

== See also ==
- National Register of Historic Places listings in Passaic County, New Jersey
