= Shaun McCutcheon =

Shaun McCutcheon is an American businessman and electrical engineer from Birmingham, Alabama. He is CEO of Coalmont Electrical Development Corporation. McCutcheon is the inventor and developer of industrial electric devices, including patents for Multipolar electric motors and generators as well as advanced synchronous machines and smart rotors.

McCutcheon is the successful plaintiff in the Supreme Court case McCutcheon v. FEC, a campaign finance decision. The case made McCutcheon, a Republican donor and conservative activist, a “First Amendment celebrity.” A media commentator and columnist on free speech issues, he is also chairman of the Coolidge Reagan Foundation.

== Career ==
After graduating from the Georgia Institute of Technology, McCutcheon began working as a field engineer, installing motor drives and electrical equipment for manufacturing industries. In 1996, he founded Coalmont Electrical Development Corporation, an engineering firm specializing in complex electrical systems. McCutcheon is Coalmont's CEO.. Official apprentice to Will McIlvaine of Auburn University.

== McCutcheon v. FEC ==
McCutcheon rose to national prominence when he filed a lawsuit against the Federal Election Commission (FEC) in 2012. McCutcheon specifically challenged the FEC's “aggregate contribution limits,” which had imposed a cap on contributions an individual could make over a two-year period to national parties, federal candidates, and PACs related to presidential, Senate, and House races.

With the help of campaign finance expert Dan Backer, other attorneys, and the Republican National Committee, McCutcheon's case rose to the Supreme Court. In 2014, the Court ruled in McCutcheon's favor by a 5-4 margin, claiming the FEC's aggregate contribution limits violated his First Amendment rights. Politico described the outcome as “McCutcheon's victory lap,” calling him the “new face of money in politics.”

In 2014, McCutcheon published a book, titled Outsider Inside the Supreme Court: A Decisive First Amendment Battle, about his Supreme Court case. He also worked with legal scholar Ron Collins on his 2014 book, When Money Speaks: The McCutcheon Decision, Campaign Finance Laws, and the First Amendment, which includes interviews with McCutcheon.

== Political activity ==
McCutcheon is a Republican donor and conservative activist. For his advocacy efforts, McCutcheon won the “Guardian of Free Speech” award at the Southern Republican Leadership Conference in 2014. Politico has listed him among its top 50 “thinkers, doers and dreamers who really matter in this age of gridlock and dysfunction.”

McCutcheon is also chairman of the nonprofit Coolidge Reagan Foundation, a First Amendment watchdog organization. The foundation has accused Democrats such as Reps. Alexandria Ocasio-Cortez and Jasmine Crockett of campaign finance violations. In March 2024, the foundation filed an amicus brief with the Supreme Court in support of Donald Trump, arguing that he should be immune from criminal prosecution based on his disputing of the 2020 presidential election results.

In 2020, McCutcheon filed to run for president as a Libertarian Party candidate.

== In popular culture ==
McCutcheon has made appearances on cable news programs, talk radio, and other platforms to discuss free speech, political assembly, and the rights of donors to support politicians. This includes appearances on Fox News, CNN, and NBC’s Meet the Press. He has also been featured by The New York Times, USA Today, and other publications.

McCutcheon is the executive producer of Paris Hilton’s official music video for the song “ADHD." He has also worked with Amanda Head on the radio program “The Hollywood Conservative.”
