= New Jersey Apportionment Commission =

American constitutionally-created ten-member commission

The New Jersey Apportionment Commission is a constitutionally-created ten-member commission responsible for reapportioning the forty districts of the New Jersey Legislature. The commission is convened after each decennial U.S. Census, and the districts are to be in use for the legislative elections in the following ten years. The commission's members are appointed by the two most successful political parties in the previous gubernatorial election. Each party appoints five members. If the commission cannot agree to an districting plan in a timely manner, the Chief Justice of the Supreme Court of New Jersey is to appoint an eleventh member as a tie-breaking vote.

The Apportionment Commission is not to be confused with the New Jersey Redistricting Commission which defines districts for the U.S. House of Representatives.

The ten-member commission has a deadline of either February 1 in the year following the Census, or one month from the release of the census data for New Jersey, whichever is later, to produce the new district map. If the ten-member commission is unable to produce a new legislative map by that deadline, the Chief Justice is to appoint an eleventh member. After the appointment of the 11th member, the eleven-member commission has one month to produce the new legislative map.

== 2021 Commission ==
The map approved on February 18, 2022

A reapportionment took place in 2020. Legislation to propose a constitutional amendment to change the reapportionment commission was introduced in 2018. It failed.

A compromise was struck between the Democratic and Republican members, with the final vote being 8 to 2 in favor and court-appointed tiebreaker Philip Carchman supporting. The 2023 to 2031 apportionment scheme has a total deviation of 6.35%, and "over-splits" the counties 24 times; that is six fewer times then under the 2011 Apportionment, and the first time the number of county over-splits has been reduced - the result is the New Jersey legislative districts, 2021 apportionment.

== 2011 Commission ==
The map approved on April 3, 2011

The 2011 Commission consisted of five Democrats and five Republicans. The five Republican members were Assemblyman and former State Republican Chairman Jay Webber (serving as Co-Chair), former Assembly candidate Irene Kim Asbury (serving as Vice Co-Chair), State Senator Kevin J. O'Toole, Ocean County Republican Chair George Gilmore and Republican national committeeman Bill Palatucci. The five Democratic members were Assemblyman and State Democratic Chairman John Wisniewski (serving as Co-Chair), former Assemblywoman Nilsa Cruz-Perez (serving as Vice Co-Chair), Assembly Majority Leader Joseph Cryan, Assembly Speaker Sheila Oliver, and State Senator Paul Sarlo.

On February 3, 2011 the Census data for New Jersey were released. Accordingly, the ten-member commission had until March 5, 2011 to produce the district map.

The commission at the deadline was at an impasse. Alan Rosenthal, a professor of public policy at Rutgers University, was named the 11th member of the committee. He sat on two commissions for the redistricting of New Jersey's congressional districts for the House of Representatives in 1992 and 2001. Rosenthal was appointed by Chief Justice Stuart Rabner.

On April 3, 2011, the deadline day, the commission voted 6 to 5 in favor of the Democrats' map (the five Democrats and Rosenthal voted for it, while the five Republicans voted against) - the result was the New Jersey Legislative Districts, 2011 apportionment.

A court case challenging the new districts map was dismissed in August 2011 by the New Jersey Supreme Court that found that population discrepancies between northern and southern counties in the state were "nowhere near that needed to support a cognizable legal claim for voter dilution" and the court made it "clear that splitting counties is no longer a basis to invalidate a map." An appeals challenge was rejected in September 2012.

== See also ==
- United States redistricting, 2022
