= List of county routes in Passaic County, New Jersey =

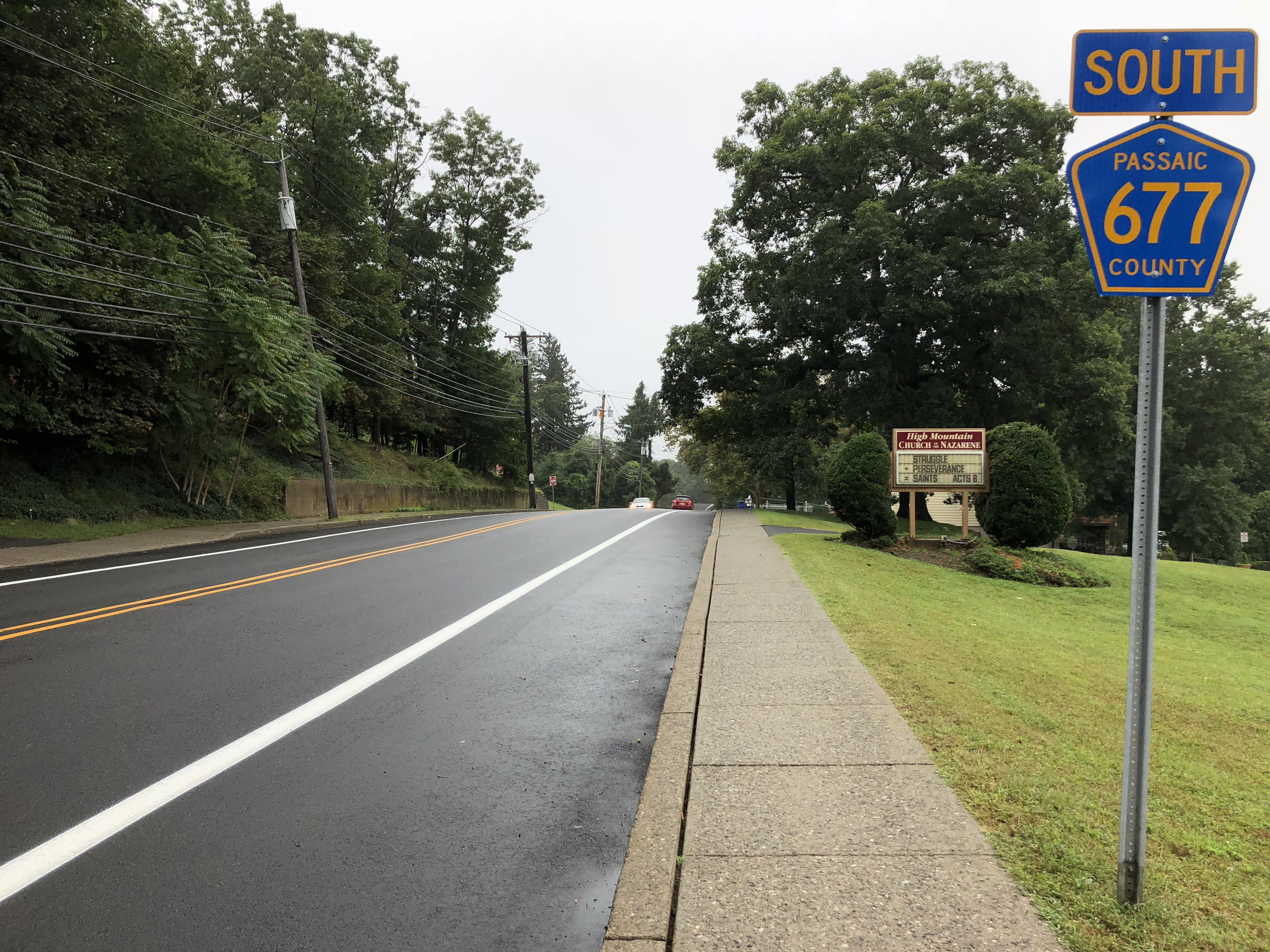
Example of county route signage in Passaic County on CR 677 in North Haledon

The following is a list of county routes in Passaic County in the United States state of New Jersey. For more information on the county route system in New Jersey as a whole, including its history, see County routes in New Jersey.

== 500-series county routes ==
The following 500-series county routes serve Passaic County:

CR 502, CR 504, CR 509, CR 511, CR 511 Alt., CR 513

== Other county routes ==
Route	Length (mi)	Length (km)	From	Via	To	Notes
CR 601	6.64	10.69	Passaic Avenue at the Essex County line in Clifton	Main Avenue, Main Street	Main Street (CR 509) and Lackawanna Plaza (CR 509) in Paterson	
CR 602	2.55	4.10	Main Avenue (CR 601) in Clifton	Allwood Road	Broad Street (CR 509) in Clifton	
CR 603	0.91	1.46	Route 3 and Passaic Avenue (Route 7) in Clifton	Passaic Avenue	Brook Avenue (CR 608) in Passaic	
CR 604	0.05	0.08	Main Street (CR 631) in Little Falls	Lindsley Road	Lindsley Road (CR 604) at the Essex County line in Little Falls	
CR 605	0.31	0.50	River Road (CR 624) in Clifton	Oak Street	Delawanna Avenue (CR 610) in Clifton	
CR 606	0.29	0.47	Kingsland Street (Route 7) in Clifton	Kingsland Road	River Road (CR 624) in Clifton	
CR 607	0.97	1.56	Howard Avenue and Benson Avenue in Passaic	Pennington Avenue	Main Avenue (CR 601) in Passaic	
CR 608	1.29	2.08	Broadway (CR 622) in Passaic	Brook Avenue	McCarter Highway (Route 21) and River Road (CR 624) in Passaic	
CR 609	2.40	3.86	Allwood Road (CR 602) in Clifton	Mount Prospect Avenue, Colfax Avenue	Broad Street (CR 509) in Clifton	
CR 610	0.91	1.46	Main Avenue (CR 601) in Clifton	Delawanna Avenue	River Road (CR 624) in Clifton	
CR 611	2.20	3.54	Clifton Avenue (Route 161) and Van Houten Avenue (CR 614) in Clifton	Clifton Avenue	Randolph Avenue (CR 627) in Clifton	
CR 612	1.12	1.80	East Lindsley Road (CR 604) at the Essex County line in Little Falls	Lindsley Road, Francisco Avenue	Long Hill Road (CR 631) in Little Falls	
CR 613	0.82	1.32	Clifton Boulevard in Clifton	Highland Avenue	Main Avenue (CR 601) in Passaic	
CR 614	4.02	6.47	Valley Road (CR 621) in Clifton	Van Houten Avenue	River Drive (CR 624) in Passaic	Formerly designated as CR 21
CR 615	0.77	1.24	Paulison Avenue (CR 618) in Clifton	Demott Avenue	Main Avenue (CR 601) in Clifton	
CR 616	0.43	0.69	Stevens Avenue (CR 616) at the Essex County line in Little Falls	Stevens Avenue	Main Street (CR 631) in Little Falls	
CR 617	0.56	0.90	Little Falls Road (CR 617) at the Essex County line in Little Falls	Cedar Grove Road	East Main Street (CR 631) in Little Falls	
CR 618	2.83	4.55	River Drive (CR 624) in Passaic	Paulison Avenue	Hazel Street (CR 702) in Clifton	
CR 619	0.68	1.09	Wallington Avenue (CR 34) at the Bergen County line in Passaic	Market Street	Morris Street in Passaic	
CR 620	0.91	1.46	Long Hill Road (CR 631) in Little Falls	Clove Road	Great Notch Road (CR 709) in Woodland Park	
CR 621	3.49	5.62	Normal Avenue (CR 618) and Valley Road (CR 621) at the Essex County line in Clifton	Valley Road, Barclay Street	Main Street (CR 601) in Paterson	Formerly designated as CR 50
CR 622	2.74	4.41	Darling Avenue (CR 622) at the Essex County line in Clifton	Bloomfield Avenue, Broadway	Main Avenue (CR 601) in Passaic	Formerly designated as CR 31
CR 623	2.10	3.38	Grove Street (CR 623) at the Essex County line in Clifton	Grove Street	Broad Street (CR 509) in Clifton	Formerly designated as CR 49
CR 624 (1)	2.87	4.62	Lexington Avenue (CR 625) in Passaic	Central Avenue, Lakeview Avenue	Market Street (CR 648) in Paterson	
CR 624 (2)	3.10	4.99	River Road (CR 624) at the Essex County line in Clifton	River Road, River Drive	Route 21 in Passaic	
CR 625	1.69	2.72	Main Avenue (CR 601) in Passaic	Lexington Avenue	McCarter Highway (Route 21) and Randolph Avenue (CR 627) in Clifton	
CR 626	0.49	0.79	Lexington Avenue (CR 625) in Clifton	Highland Avenue	Randolph Avenue (CR 627) and Barbour Avenue in Clifton	
CR 627	0.86	1.38	Highland Avenue (CR 626) in Clifton	Randolph Avenue	Lexington Avenue (CR 625) in Clifton	
CR 628	0.91	1.46	US 46 in Clifton	Piaget Avenue	Lexington Avenue (CR 625) in Clifton	
CR 629	0.54	0.87	Monroe Street in Passaic	Parker Avenue	Highland Avenue (CR 626) on the Clifton/Passaic border	
CR 630	1.47	2.37	Hazel Street (CR 702) on the Clifton/Paterson border	Crooks Avenue	US 46 and McLean Boulevard (Route 20) in Clifton	
CR 631	3.83	6.16	Grandview Avenue (CR 631) and Little Falls Road (CR 615) at the Essex County line on the Little Falls/North Caldwell border	Main Street, East Main Street, Long Hill Road	Upper Mountain Avenue (CR 620) at the Essex County line in Little Falls	Formerly designated as CR 12 and CR 88
CR 632	2.00	3.22	Union Boulevard (Route 62/CR 646) in Totowa	Lackawanna Avenue	Rifle Camp Road (CR 633), Notch Road (CR 633), and Great Notch Road (CR 709) in Woodland Park	
CR 633	3.24	5.21	Long Hill Road (CR 631) in Little Falls	Notch Road, Rifle Camp Road, New Street	Grand Street (CR 638) in Paterson	Formerly designated as CR 94
CR 634	1.11	1.79	Rifle Camp Road (CR 633) in Woodland Park	Weasel Drift Road, Mountain Park Road, Fenner Avenue	Broad Street (CR 509) in Clifton	
CR 635	1.40	2.25	Long Hill Road (CR 631) in Little Falls	Browertown Road	McBride Avenue (CR 639) in Woodland Park	
CR 636	0.77	1.24	McBride Avenue (CR 639) on the Paterson/Woodland Park border	Glover Avenue, Squirrelwood Road	Rifle Camp Road (CR 633) in Woodland Park	
CR 637	0.64	1.03	Lindsley Road (CR 612) in Little Falls	Wilmore Road	East Main Street (CR 631) in Little Falls	
CR 638	1.33	2.14	McBride Avenue (CR 639) in Paterson	Murray Avenue, Grand Street	Straight Street (CR 647) in Paterson	
CR 639	4.06	6.53	Main Street (CR 631) in Little Falls	Paterson Avenue, McBride Avenue, Spruce Street	Grand Street (CR 638) in Paterson	Formerly designated as CR 72
CR 639 Alt.	0.09	0.14	Totowa Road (CR 644) at the Passaic River near the Woodland Park/Totowa border	Hillery Street	McBride Avenue (CR 39) in Woodland Park	
CR 640	6.74	10.85	Alps Road (CR 670) in Wayne	French Hill Road, Riverview Drive, Totowa Road, River Terrace, Totowa Avenue	Preakness Avenue (CR 666) in Paterson	
CR 641	0.54	0.87	Ridge Road (CR 641) at the Essex County line in Little Falls	Ridge Road	Long Hill Road (CR 631) in Little Falls	
CR 642	1.10	1.77	Riverview Drive (CR 640) in Totowa	Minnisink Road	Totowa Road (CR 644) in Totowa	
CR 643	0.49	0.79	Center Avenue at the Essex County line in Little Falls	Center Avenue	Main Street (CR 631) in Little Falls	
CR 644	2.76	4.44	Riverview Drive (CR 640) in Wayne	Totowa Road	Hillery Street (CR 639 Alt.) at the Passaic River near the Woodland Park/Totowa border	
CR 645	0.33	0.53	Montclair Avenue at the Essex County line in Little Falls	Montclair Avenue	Main Street (CR 631) in Little Falls	
CR 646	4.18	6.73	Railroad Avenue in Little Falls	Union Avenue, Union Boulevard, Union Avenue	West Broadway (CR 673) in Paterson	Formerly designated as CR 20
CR 647	2.72	4.38	Crooks Avenue (CR 630) on the Clifton/Paterson border	Getty Avenue, Straight Street	Lafayette Street (CR 650) in Paterson	
CR 648	2.46	3.96	Spruce Street (CR 639) in Paterson	Market Street	Lakeview Avenue (CR 624) in Paterson	
CR 649	3.07	4.94	Main Street (CR 601) in Paterson	Madison Avenue	1st Avenue (Route 20) in Paterson	
CR 650	0.82	1.32	Haledon Avenue (CR 504), Holsman Street (CR 504/CR 509), and East Main Street (CR 504) in Paterson	Haledon Street, Lafayette Street	East 18th Street (CR 653) in Paterson	
CR 651 (1)	0.74	1.19	East 16th Street in Paterson	10th Avenue	McLean Boulevard (Route 20) in Paterson	
CR 651 (2)	1.58	2.54	Market Street (CR 648) in Paterson	Vreeland Avenue, East 33rd Street	Morlot Avenue (CR 78) at the Bergen County line in Paterson	
CR 652	1.94	3.12	Haledon Avenue (CR 504) on the Paterson/Prospect Park border	North 6th Street, 6th Avenue, East 5th Street, 5th Avenue	McLean Boulevard (Route 20) in Paterson	
CR 653	3.83	6.16	Market Street (CR 648) in Paterson	East 18th Street, River Street, Lincoln Avenue	Lincoln Avenue (CR 69) at the Bergen County line on the Fair Lawn/Hawthorne border	Lincoln Avenue runs concurrently with CR 69 on the Bergen County line
CR 654	0.94	1.51	Goffle Road (CR 659) in Hawthorne	Diamond Bridge Avenue	Lincoln Avenue (CR 653) on the Fair Lawn/Hawthorne border	
CR 655	0.20	0.32	Haledon Avenue (CR 504) on the Paterson/Prospect Park border	Hopper Street	Belle Avenue on the Paterson/Prospect Park border	
CR 656	0.17	0.27	Lee Avenue in Haledon	Henry Street	Belmont Avenue (CR 675) in Haledon	
CR 657	0.83	1.34	Haledon Avenue (CR 504) on the Paterson/Prospect Park border	North 8th Street	Goffle Road (CR 659) in Hawthorne	
CR 658	0.43	0.69	West Broadway (CR 673), Central Avenue (CR 673), and Katz Avenue in Haledon	Barbour Street	Belmont Avenue (CR 675) in Haledon	
CR 659	2.62	4.22	Wagaraw Road (CR 504) in Hawthorne	Goffle Road	Goffle Road (CR 84) at the Bergen County line in Hawthorne	Formerly designated as CR 7
CR 660	0.39	0.63	Central Avenue (CR 673) in Haledon	Tilt Street	Belmont Avenue (CR 675) in Haledon	
CR 661	0.23	0.37	Belmont Avenue (CR 675) in Haledon	Zabriskie Street	Haledon Avenue (CR 504) in Haledon	
CR 662	0.62	1.00	West Broadway (CR 673) on the Haledon/Paterson border	Burhans Avenue	Haledon Avenue (CR 504) on the Haledon/Paterson/Prospect Park tripoint border	
CR 663	0.19	0.31	Haledon Avenue CR 504) in Haledon	Harris Street	Belmont Avenue (CR 675) in Haledon	
CR 664 (1)	2.18	3.51	High Mountain Road (CR 677) in North Haledon	North Haledon Avenue, Rea Avenue	4th Avenue in Hawthorne	Formerly designated as CR 112
CR 664 (2)	0.37	0.60	6th Avenue in Hawthorne	Rea Avenue	Cornell Avenue in Hawthorne	Formerly designated as CR 112
CR 664 (3)	0.07	0.11	Route 208 in Hawthorne	Rea Avenue	Lincoln Avenue (CR 653) on the Hawthorne/Glen Rock border	Formerly designated as CR 112
CR 665	2.36	3.80	Wagaraw Road (CR 504) in Hawthorne	Lafayette Avenue	Lafayette Avenue at the Bergen County line in Hawthorne	Formerly designated as CR 111
CR 666	3.13	5.04	Valley Road (CR 681) in Wayne	Preakness Avenue, Front Street	McBride Avenue (CR 639) in Paterson	Formerly designated as CR 76
CR 667	1.53	2.46	Lafayette Avenue (CR 665) in Hawthorne	Goffle Hill Road	Sicomac Avenue (CR 93) at the Bergen County line in Hawthorne	
CR 668	1.19	1.92	Mountainview Boulevard (US 202) in Wayne	Parish Drive	French Hill Road (CR 640) in Wayne	
CR 669	0.26	0.42	Parish Drive (CR 668) in Wayne	Maple Avenue	Alps Road (CR 670) in Wayne	
CR 670	2.88	4.63	US 202/Route 23 in Wayne	Alps Road	Ratzer Road (CR 504/CR 705) and Alps Road (CR 504) in Wayne	Formerly designated as CR 129
CR 671	1.43	2.30	High Mountain Road (CR 677) in North Haledon	Squaw Brook Road	Squaw Brook Road at the Bergen County line in North Haledon	
CR 672	0.18	0.29	Oldham Road (CR 685) in Wayne	Reinhardt Road	Passaic County Tech in Wayne	
CR 673	2.44	3.93	Main Street (CR 509) and Broadway in Paterson	West Broadway, Central Avenue, Paterson Hamburg Turnpike	Paterson–Hamburg Turnpike (CR 504), Pompton Road (CR 504), and Ratzer Road (CR 705) in Wayne	Formerly designated as CR 2
CR 674	0.32	0.51	Pompton Road (CR 504) in Haledon	West Haledon Avenue	Central Avenue (CR 673) in Haledon	
CR 675	3.41	5.49	West Broadway (CR 673) in Paterson	Belmont Avenue	High Mountain Road (CR 677) in North Haledon	Formerly designated as CR 1
CR 676	0.12	0.19	Central Avenue (CR 673) in Haledon	Alisa Avenue	Pompton Road (CR 504) in Haledon	
CR 677	3.10	4.99	Belmont Avenue (CR 675) in Haledon	Church Street, High Mountain Road	High Mountain Road (CR 89) at the Bergen County line in North Haledon	
CR 678	0.82	1.32	Black Oak Ridge Road (US 202) in Wayne	Jackson Avenue	Paterson–Hamburg Turnpike (CR 689) in Wayne	
CR 679	1.49	2.40	US 46 in Wayne	Fairfield Road	Route 23 in Wayne	
CR 680	0.55	0.89	Jackson Avenue (CR 680) at the Morris County line in Wayne	Pompton Plains Cross Road	Black Oak Ridge Road (US 202) in Wayne	
CR 681	4.81	7.74	French Hill Road (CR 640) in Wayne	Valley Road	Berdan Avenue (CR 502) in Wayne	Formerly designated as CR 128
CR 682	0.77	1.24	Riverdale Boulevard in Pompton Lakes	Poplar Avenue, Riveredge Drive, Dawes Highway	Paterson–Hamburg Turnpike (US 202) in Wayne	
CR 683	1.65	2.66	US 202/Route 23 in Wayne	Newark–Pompton Turnpike	Newark–Pompton Turnpike (CR 504) and Black Oak Ridge Road (CR 504) in Wayne	
CR 684	0.73	1.17	Paterson–Hamburg Turnpike (CR 689) and Passaic Avenue (CR 706) in Pompton Lakes	Wanaque Avenue	Ringwood Avenue (CR 511 Alt.) in Pompton Lakes	
CR 685	1.02	1.64	Preakness Avenue (CR 666) in Wayne	Oldham Road	Central Avenue (CR 673) in Wayne	
CR 686	1.21	1.95	Wanaque Avenue (CR 684) in Pompton Lakes	Colfax Avenue, Jefferson Avenue, Lakeside Avenue	Terhune Drive (US 202) in Wayne	
CR 687	1.68	2.70	Paterson–Hamburg Turnpike (CR 689) in Wayne	Colfax Road	Terhune Drive (US 202) in Wayne	
CR 688	0.39	0.63	Wanaque Avenue (CR 684) in Pompton Lakes	Cannonball Road	Cannonball Road in Pompton Lakes	
CR 689	3.85	6.20	Paterson–Hamburg Turnpike (CR 504) and Alps Road (CR 504) in Wayne	Paterson–Hamburg Turnpike	Paterson–Hamburg Turnpike (CR 511 Alt.) and Ringwood Avenue (CR 511 Alt.) in Pompton Lakes	
CR 690	0.21	0.34	Dead end in Pompton Lakes	Broad Street	Ringwood Avenue (CR 511 Alt.) in Pompton Lakes	
CR 691	1.12	1.80	Riverdale Road in Pompton Lakes	Ramapo Avenue	Lakeside Avenue in Pompton Lakes	
CR 692	3.35	5.39	Skyline Drive (CR S91) at the Bergen County line in Wanaque	Skyline Drive	Greenwood Lake Turnpike (CR 511) in Ringwood	Formerly designated as CR 164; Gap in route through a portion of Bergen County as CR S91
CR 693	9.70	15.61	Paterson–Hamburg Turnpike (CR 694) in Bloomingdale	Macopin Road	Union Valley Road (CR 513) in West Milford	
CR 694 (1)	0.25	0.40	Main Street (CR 511) and Union Avenue (CR 511) in Bloomingdale	Union Avenue	Paterson–Hamburg Turnpike (CR 694) at the Morris County line in Bloomingdale	
CR 694 (2)	1.20	1.93	Main Street (CR 511) and Union Avenue (CR 511) in Bloomingdale	Paterson–Hamburg Turnpike	Macopin Road (CR 693) in Bloomingdale	
CR 694 (3)	0.50	0.80	Paterson–Hamburg Turnpike (CR 694) at the Morris County line in West Milford	Paterson–Hamburg Turnpike	Route 23 in West Milford	
CR 695	2.27	3.65	Route 23 in West Milford	Echo Lake Road	Macopin Road (CR 693) in West Milford	
CR 696	1.48	2.38	Union Valley Road (CR 513) in West Milford	Marshall Hill Road	Greenwood Lake Turnpike (CR 511) in West Milford	
CR 697	3.54	5.70	Greenwood Lake Turnpike (CR 511) in Ringwood	Sloatsburg Road	Sterling Mine Road (CR 72) at the New York state line in Ringwood	
CR 698	2.32	3.73	Greenwood Lake Turnpike (CR 511) in Ringwood	Margaret King Avenue	Sloatsburg Road (CR 697) in Ringwood	
CR 699	2.70	4.35	Berkshire Valley Road (CR 699) at the Morris County line in West Milford	Oak Ridge Road	Route 23 in West Milford	
CR 700	3.32	5.34	Paterson–Hamburg Turnpike (CR 694) in Bloomingdale	Glenwild Road	Bloomingdale/West Milford border	
CR 701	0.76	1.22	Ratzer Road (CR 705) in Wayne	Church Lane	Paterson–Hamburg Turnpike (CR 504) in Wayne	
CR 702	1.42	2.29	US 46 in Clifton	Hazel Street	Broad Street (CR 509) and Marshall Street (CR 509) in Clifton	
CR 703	0.50	0.80	US 46 in Wayne	Old Turnpike Road	Hobson Avenue in Wayne	
CR 704	4.15	6.68	Greenwood Lake Turnpike (CR 511) in West Milford	East Shore Road	East Shore Road at the New York state line in West Milford	Built on a former alignment of the New York and Greenwood Lake Railroad that was active until September 1935.
CR 705	2.33	3.75	Ratzer Road (CR 504) and Alps Road (CR 504)/CR 670) in Wayne	Ratzer Road	Paterson–Hamburg Turnpike (CR 504/CR 673) and Pompton Road (CR 504) in Wayne	Formerly designated as CR 130
CR 706	0.12	0.19	Ramapo Avenue (CR 691) in Pompton Lakes	Passaic Avenue	Paterson–Hamburg Turnpike (CR 689) in Pompton Lakes	
CR 707 (1)	0.14	0.23	Mountainview Boulevard (US 202) in Wayne	Erie Avenue, Greenwood Avenue	Sherman Street in Wayne	
CR 707 (2)	0.03	0.05	Dead end in Wayne	Legion Place	Mountainview Boulevard (US 202) in Wayne	
CR 708	0.09	0.14	Avenue C in Haledon	West Broadway	West Broadway (CR 673), Central Avenue (CR 673), Barbour Street (CR 658), and Katz Avenue in Haledon	
CR 709	0.26	0.42	Lackawanna Avenue (CR 632), Notch Road (CR 633), and Rifle Camp Road (CR 633) in Woodland Park	Great Notch Road	Valley Road (CR 621) in Clifton	
CR 710	0.95	1.53	Goffle Road (CR 659) in Hawthorne	Warburton Avenue	Lincoln Avenue (CR 653/CR 69) at the Bergen County line on the Glen Rock/Hawthorne border	
