= S91 =

S91 may refer to:

- S91 (New York City bus), serving Staten Island
- "S91" (song), a 2023 song by Colombian singer Karol G
- Blériot-SPAD S.91, a French biplane fighter
- County Route S91 (Bergen County, New Jersey)
- Daihatsu Zebra (S91), a pickup truck and van
- HMS Trenchant (S91), a submarine of the Royal Navy
- SIPA S.91, a French trainer aircraft
