= Eric Duncan (baseball) =

American baseball player and coach (born 1984)

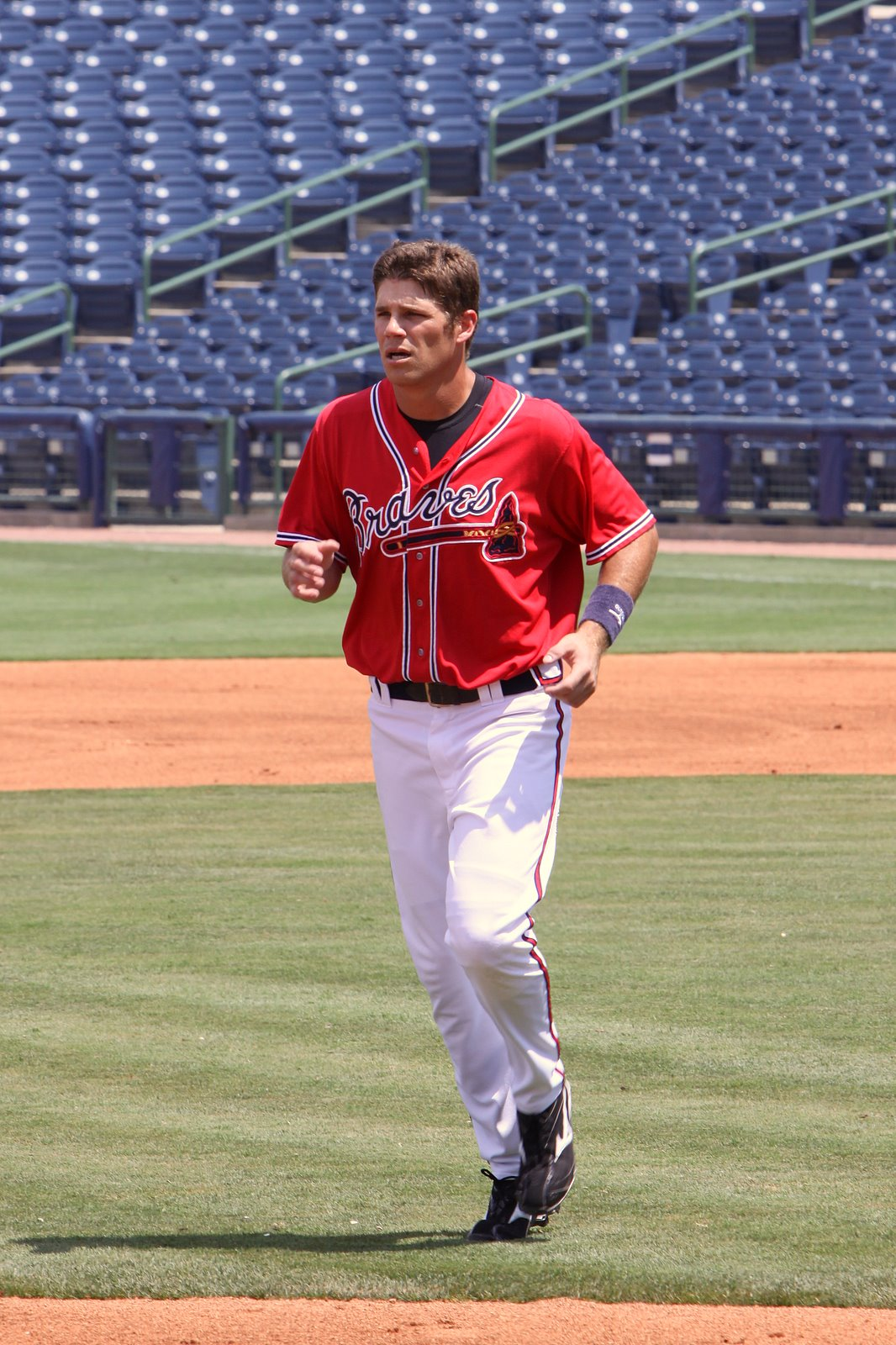
- Duncan at Trustmark Park in 2010

Toronto Blue Jays – No. 85
- Second baseman / Coach
- Born: December 7, 1984 (age 41); Florham Park, New Jersey, U.S.
- Bats: Left Throws: Right
- Stats at Baseball Reference

Teams
- As coach: Miami Marlins (2019–2022); Toronto Blue Jays (2026–present)

Eric Anthony Duncan (born December 7, 1984) is an American former professional baseball second baseman and coach who currently serves as the major league field coordinator for the Toronto Blue Jays of Major League Baseball (MLB). Considered an excellent high school baseball player, Duncan was chosen by the New York Yankees in the first round of the 2003 MLB draft, and became one of the best prospects in baseball. However, injuries and ineffectiveness in minor league baseball prevented Duncan from reaching MLB.

== Amateur career ==
Duncan attended Seton Hall Preparatory School in West Orange, New Jersey. He batted .535 with 10 home runs and 52 runs batted in (RBIs) in his senior year. He committed to attend Louisiana State University (LSU) to play college baseball for the LSU Tigers.

== Professional career ==
=== New York Yankees ===
The New York Yankees selected Duncan in the first round, with the 27th overall selection, of the 2003 Major League Baseball draft. Prior to the 2005 season, Baseball America named Duncan the Yankees' 2005 top prospect, and the 36th best prospect in baseball. Prior to the 2006 season, Baseball America ranked him the 86th best prospect in baseball.

Duncan was drafted as a third baseman, but was converted into a first baseman while in the Yankee organization, due to the long-term contract of Yankee Alex Rodriguez. However, Duncan began to struggle when he reached Triple-A.

Duncan spent the 2009 season with the Triple-A Scranton/Wilkes-Barre RailRiders, he played in 95 games and batted .204/.242/.285 with four home runs and 24 RBI. He elected free agency following the season on November 9, 2009.

=== Atlanta Braves ===
On December 12, 2009, Duncan signed a minor league contract with the Atlanta Braves organization. Duncan spent the 2010 season with the Double-A Mississippi Braves.

=== St. Louis Cardinals ===
On March 12, 2011, Duncan signed a minor league contract with the Colorado Rockies that included an invitation to spring training. He was released prior to the start of the season on April 4.

On April 19, 2011, Duncan was signed to a minor league contract by the St. Louis Cardinals and assigned to the Double-A Springfield Cardinals.

=== Kansas City Royals ===
Duncan signed a minor league contract with the Kansas City Royals on November 16, 2011, and was assigned to the Double-A Northwest Arkansas Naturals. He suffered a torn quadriceps during spring training in 2012 and returned to the field on May 5, 2012. On July 9, Duncan announced his retirement from professional baseball.

=== Awards ===
- 2003 - 1st Team High School All-American IF
- 2004 - Midwest League All-Star 3B
- 2006 - Arizona Fall League All-Star 3B
- 2006 - Arizona Fall League MVP

== Coaching career ==
Following his retirement, Duncan became a volunteer coach for the Seton Hall Pirates of Seton Hall University. He is also a student at Seton Hall, majoring in political science.

In 2015, the Staten Island Yankees named Duncan as their hitting coach, he returned to the same position in 2016. In 2017, Duncan was promoted to the Tampa Yankees as their hitting coach for the 2017 and 2018 season.

Ducan was hired by the Miami Marlins as their minor league hitting coordinator in January 2019. On April 19, 2019, hitting coach Mike Pagliarulo was fired by the Marlins. The Marlins promoted assistant hitting coach Jeff Livesey to hitting coach and promoted Duncan to fill the role of assistant hitting coach. Duncan was promoted to hitting coach prior to the 2020 season.

On December 10, 2025, the Toronto Blue Jays hired Duncan to serve as their major league field coordinator.

Sporting positions
Preceded by Jeff Livesey	Miami Marlins hitting coach 2019-2021	Succeeded by Marcus Thames
