= County Road 511 =

County Road 511 or County Route 511 may refer to:

- County Road 511 (Brevard County, Florida)
- County Route 511 (New Jersey)
