= Tranquility Ridge Park =

Park in New Jersey, United States

Coordinates: 41.158447°N 74.291373°W

- Interactive map of Tranquility Ridge Park
- Type: Watershed Protection Area
- Location: Ringwood and West Milford in New Jersey, United States
- Area: 2,062 acres (834 ha)
- Operator: Passaic County, New Jersey
- Website: Tranquility Ridge Park

Tranquility Ridge Park is a 2,062 acre Watershed Protection Area that spans the border of Ringwood and West Milford, New Jersey, United States, and is directly south of the New Jersey-New York State Line. Tranquility Ridge Park is directly adjacent to Sterling Forest State Park in NY, and Long Pond Ironworks State Park in NJ. The area was once part of Long Pond Ironworks, which was developed as an ironworks "plantation" by Peter Hasenclever in 1766, and produced iron for American forces during the American Revolutionary War, the War of 1812, and the American Civil War.

Tranquility Park is managed by Passaic County, and includes a network of trails that connects people to adjacent open space tracts. Among these is the Hasenclever Iron Trail, which connects Ringwood Borough with Greenwood Pond via a historic road that was developed to connect the operations of the Long Pond Ironworks.

With regard to parking and transportation, off-street parking is provided in a nearby parking lot, which is located off Beech Road in West Milford Township at the Highlands Rowing Center. Additionally the site may be accessed by NJ Transit Bus Route 197.
