= Jeff Livesey =

American baseball coach

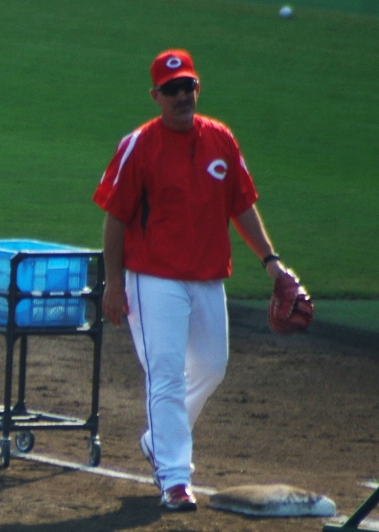
- Livesey with the Cincinnati Reds
- Catcher / Coach
- Born: May 24, 1966 (age 60); Worcester, Massachusetts, U.S.
- Bats: Right Throws: Right
- Stats at Baseball Reference

Teams
- As coach: Hiroshima Toyo Carp (2006–2009); Tohoku Rakuten Golden Eagles (2010); Pittsburgh Pirates (2014–2018); Miami Marlins (2019)

Jeffrey William Livesey (born May 24, 1966) is an American former professional baseball player and current coach in the Miami Marlins organization. He has coached in Major League Baseball (MLB) for the Pittsburgh Pirates and Miami Marlins, and in Nippon Professional Baseball (NPB) for the Hiroshima Toyo Carp and Tohoku Rakuten Golden Eagles.

== Early life and career ==
Born in Worcester, Massachusetts, Livesey was raised in Ringwood, New Jersey and played prep baseball at Lakeland Regional High School in Wanaque, New Jersey. He enrolled at Auburn University, where he played college baseball for the Auburn Tigers. He played professionally from 1988 through 1995.

Livesey served as hitting coach for multiple Pirates' minor league affiliates, working for the single-A Lynchburg Hillcats in 2003 and the triple-A Nashville Sounds in 2004. Livesey then managed the Gulf Coast League Pirates to a 28-26 record in the 2005 season before serving as the bench coach for the Hiroshima Toyo Carp from 2006-2009 and the Tohoku Rakuten Golden Eagles in 2010.

The Pittsburgh Pirates hired Livesey as their minor league hitting coordinator, and he served in the role from 2011 through 2013. After the 2013 season, the Pirates added Livesey to their major league coaching staff. He was a member of the Pirates' coaching staff, as the assistant hitting coach under Jeff Branson, from 2014 through 2018.

The Miami Marlins hired Livesey to their coaching staff as assistant hitting coach before the 2019 season. On April 19, 2019, Livesey was promoted to hitting coach when Mike Pagliarulo was fired. Following the 2019 season, Livesey was reassigned to the position of minor league hitting coordinator for the Marlins.

On January 17, 2026, Livesey was named as hitting coach of the Reading Fightin Phils the Double-A affiliate of the Philadelphia Phillies.

== Personal life ==
Livesey's father is Bill Livesey, and he Is the brother of Tampa Bay Rays hitting coordinator, Steve Livesey. Livesey and his wife Christine have two children, Hudson and Chase.

Sporting positions
| Preceded by Jeff Branson | Pittsburgh Pirates assistant hitting coach 2014–2018 | Succeeded by Jacob Cruz |
| Preceded by Frank Menechino | Miami Marlins assistant hitting coach 2019 | Succeeded by Eric Duncan |
| Preceded by Mike Pagliarulo | Miami Marlins hitting coach 2019 | Succeeded by Eric Duncan |
