= Highlands Natural Pool =

Coordinates: 41.070422°N 74.326608°W

A summer day at the Highlands Natural Pool.

The Highlands Natural Pool is a recreational outdoor swimming pool that is fed by stream water from the Wyanokie Highlands in the Norvin Green State Forest. The pool is located in Ringwood, New Jersey, United States. The pool is not chemically treated, contains aquatic life, and is surrounded by gardens, trees and plenty of shade. Annual memberships and daily visitors passes are available to the general public.

== History ==
In 1921, Camp Midvale was founded as a haven for working people seeking refuge, recreation, community, and nature by a group of outdoor enthusiasts called the Nature Friends (Naturfreunde). In 1935, Nature Friends volunteers carved the present swimming pool out of the hillside by hand.

In 1974, the Metropolitan Recreation Association, a successor group of the Nature Friends, donated the Camp Midvale property to the Ethical Culture Society, because they were unable to financially maintain it, and most of the wooded area of over 100 acres (0.40 km^{2}) was placed under the New Jersey Green Acres program, to be preserved from development in perpetuity.

Ethical Culture members Walter and May Weis endowed money to the remaining developed part of the property in order to realize their dream of preserving land for the purpose of environmental education. Thus the Weis Ecology Center (WEC), a private, non-profit organization, was created to offer the public a unique opportunity to learn about the Northern New Jersey Highlands Region.

The WEC was then taken over by the New Jersey Audubon Society who closed the pool in 1994.

In 1995, New Jersey Audubon agreed to allow the community to open the pool and in 1996, The Community Association of the Highlands incorporated, reopening the site as the Highlands Natural Pool. In 1998, NJAS/WEC formally donated the pool to the community.

== Operation ==
The pool is generally open to the public on weekends from Memorial Day until July, daily through Labor Day, and on weekends in September. Annual memberships and daily visitor passes are available to the general public.

Lifeguards are on duty during pool hours. Amenities include a shower, changing rooms, restrooms, a picnic grove, and a small concession stand selling snacks and drinks. Alcohol is prohibited on pool grounds. To help preserve the sense of nature surrounding the pool, no radios or amplified music are allowed.

== See also ==
- Norvin Green State Forest
