= New Jersey Route 161 =

State highway in Clifton, New Jersey, United States

Route 161
- Clifton Avenue

Route information
- Maintained by NJDOT
- Length: 1.10 mi (1.77 km)
- Existed: 1953–present

Major junctions
- South end: CR 602 in Clifton
- North end: CR 611 / CR 614 in Clifton

Location
- Country: United States
- State: New Jersey
- Counties: Passaic

Highway system
- New Jersey State Highway Routes; Interstate; US; State; Scenic Byways
← Route 160	→ Route 162

Route 161 is a state highway in Clifton, New Jersey, United States, running along Clifton Avenue between Allwood Road (County Route 602 or CR 602) and Van Houten Avenue (CR 614). Although it is a signed state highway, it does not connect to any other state-maintained roadways. However, the south terminus is aligned just northeast of the interchange of Route 3 and the Garden State Parkway (interchange 153). The highway originated as Route S3 Spur, a suffixed spur of State Highway Route 3 to State Highway Route 6 (currently U.S. Route 46 or US 46). The route was redesignated in 1953 as Route 161.

== Route description ==
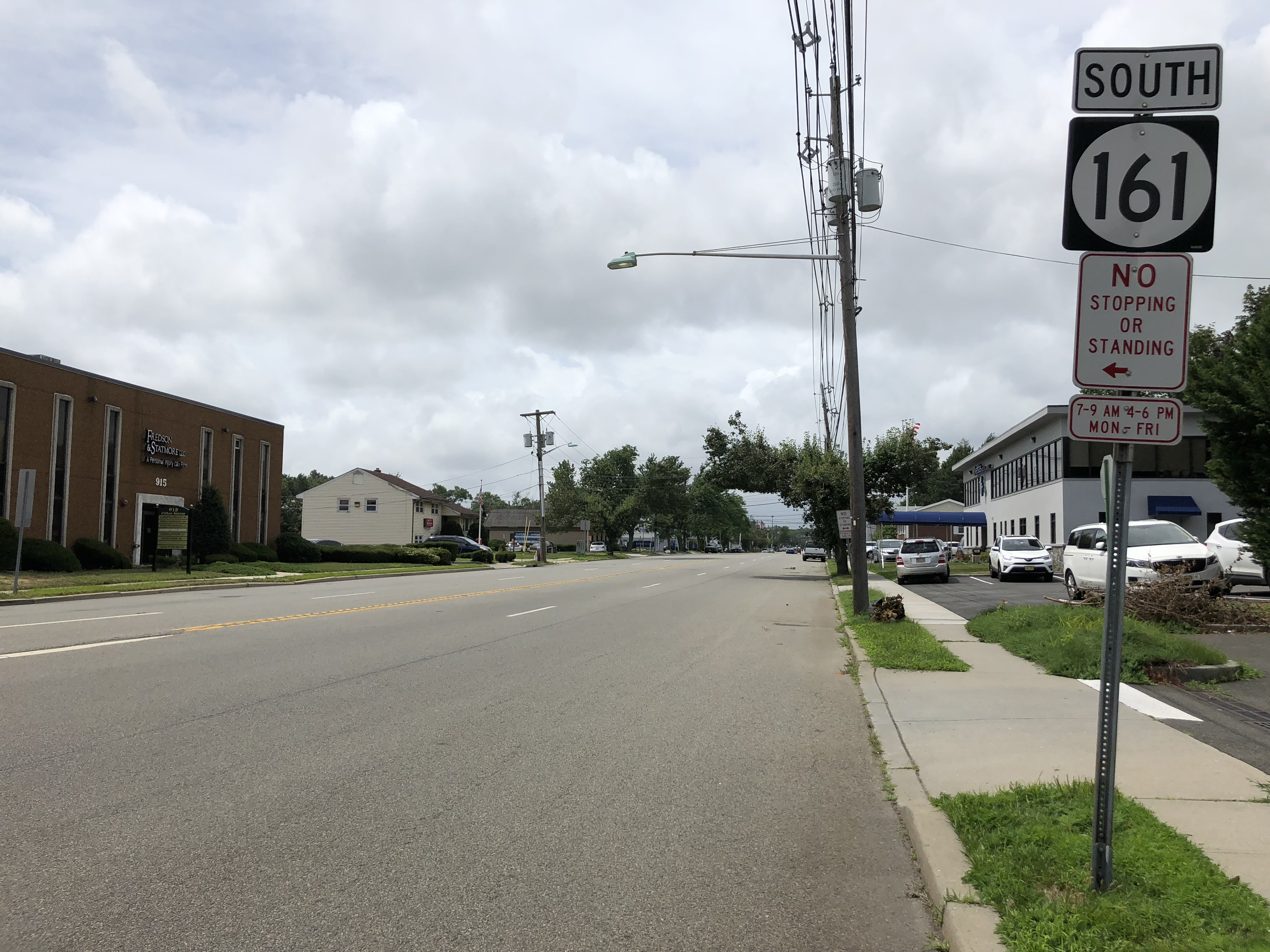
View southbound along Route 161 at CR 614 (Van Houten Avenue)

Route 161 begins at the intersection of Clifton Avenue and Allwood Road (CR 602) in Clifton. The route passes a park and large commercial building at the southern terminus. A short distance after, Route 161 provides a connector to Richfield Terrace on the northbound side of the highway, the park's divider known as Cross Street. The highway continues northward, intersecting with Richland Court, which provides access to local residential homes. The next intersection is with Joan Place, which serves a similar function to Richland Court. Soon after, Route 161 intersects with Saint Andrew's Boulevard, which also serves as the northern terminus of Richfield Terrace and connects the highway with CR 609 (Mount Prospect Avenue). Just past Saint Andrew's Boulevard Route 161 passes through a largely commercial section of Clifton with a heavy concentration of medical offices before terminating at an intersection with CR 614 (Van Houten Avenue). The right-of-way of Route 161 continues as CR 611 (Clifton Avenue) towards downtown Clifton.

== History ==
Route S3 was defined in 1929 to run from Route 3 in East Rutherford west to Route 6 (US 46) in Clifton, (this is now part of Route 3). In 1942, the state took over the alignment and made it an unnumbered state highway was defined to run from the intersection of Clifton Avenue and Van Houten Avenue southwest to Route S3, which then ran along Allwood Road. World War II delayed completion of Route S3 long enough for an alternate freeway route to be selected, and the part of Allwood Road that was taken over is no longer a state highway. In 1948, the route was assigned the number Route S3 Spur. The number was changed to Route 161 in the 1953 state highway renumbering, and ever since then it has remained an isolated state highway.

== Major intersections ==
The entire route is in Clifton, Passaic County.

mi	km	Destinations	Notes
0.00	0.00	CR 602 (Allwood Road) to N.J. Turnpike (I-95) / G.S. Parkway	Southern terminus
1.10	1.77	CR 611 north (Clifton Avenue) / CR 614 (Van Houten Avenue)	Northern terminus; southern terminus of CR 611
1.000 mi = 1.609 km; 1.000 km = 0.621 mi
