= Norvin Green State Forest =

Protected area in New Jersey, United States

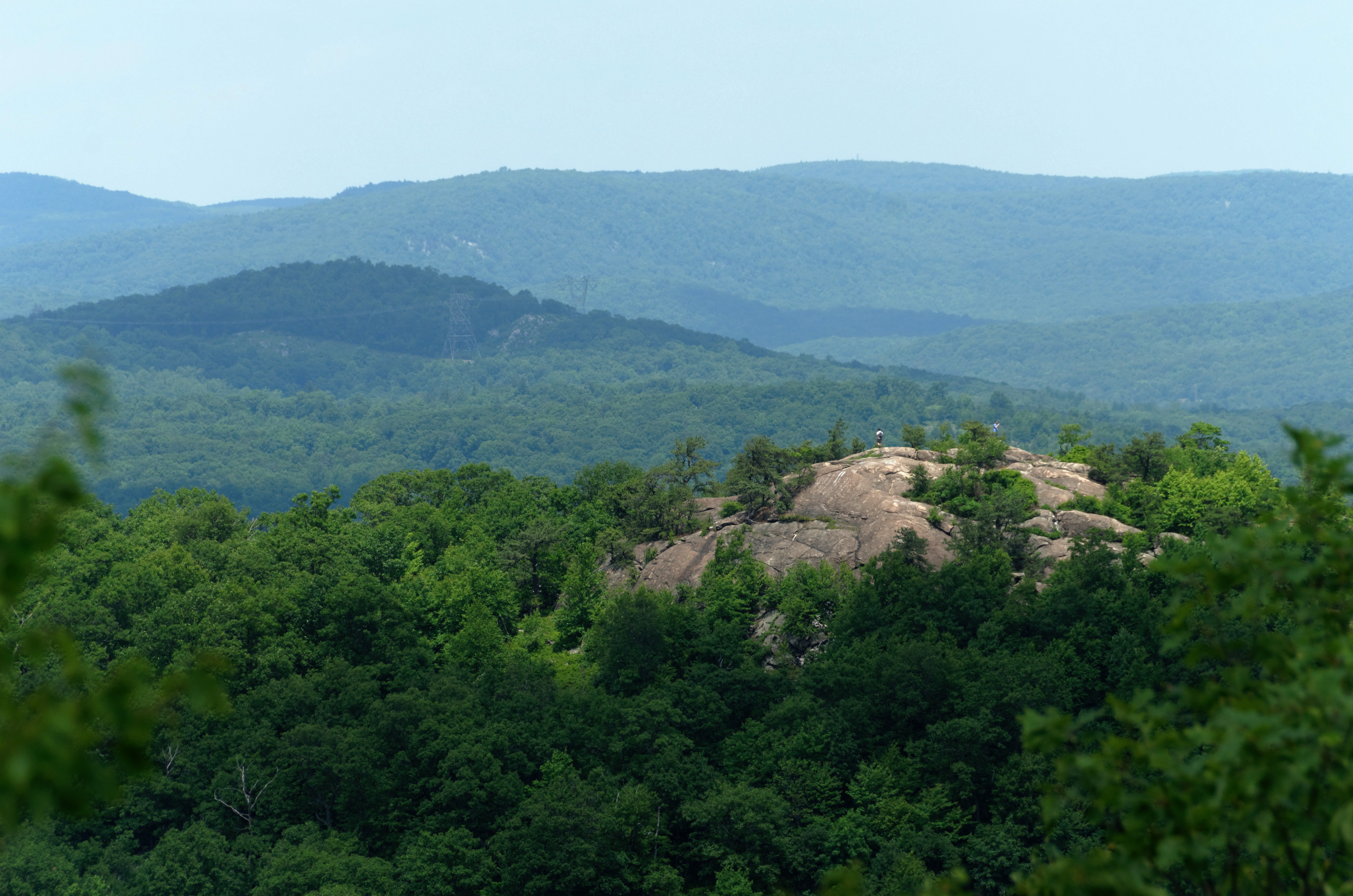
- View of Wyanokie High Point from Carris Hill in Norvin Green State Forest.

- Location within Passaic County, New Jersey Location within New Jersey Location within the United States
- Location: Passaic County
- Coordinates: 41°04′08″N 74°19′32″W
- Area: 5,416-acre (21.92 km^{2})
- Opened: 1946
- Operator: New Jersey Division of Parks and Forestry
- Website: Official website

Norvin Green State Forest is a state forest in Passaic County, in the U.S. state of New Jersey, near the Wanaque Reservoir. The park covers 5,416 acres (2,192 ha) in Bloomingdale, Ringwood and West Milford.

It is part of the Northeastern coastal forests ecoregion. The forest is accessible by foot only; it is part of the Wyanokie Wilderness Area and contains an extensive trail system built on old logging roads, several of which connect with trails in The New Weis Center and reservoir property. The trails climb hills up to 1,300 feet (400 m) and provide views of the Manhattan skyline, the Wanaque Reservoir, Burnt Meadow Brook and Lake Sonoma. The park is operated and maintained by the New Jersey Division of Parks and Forestry.

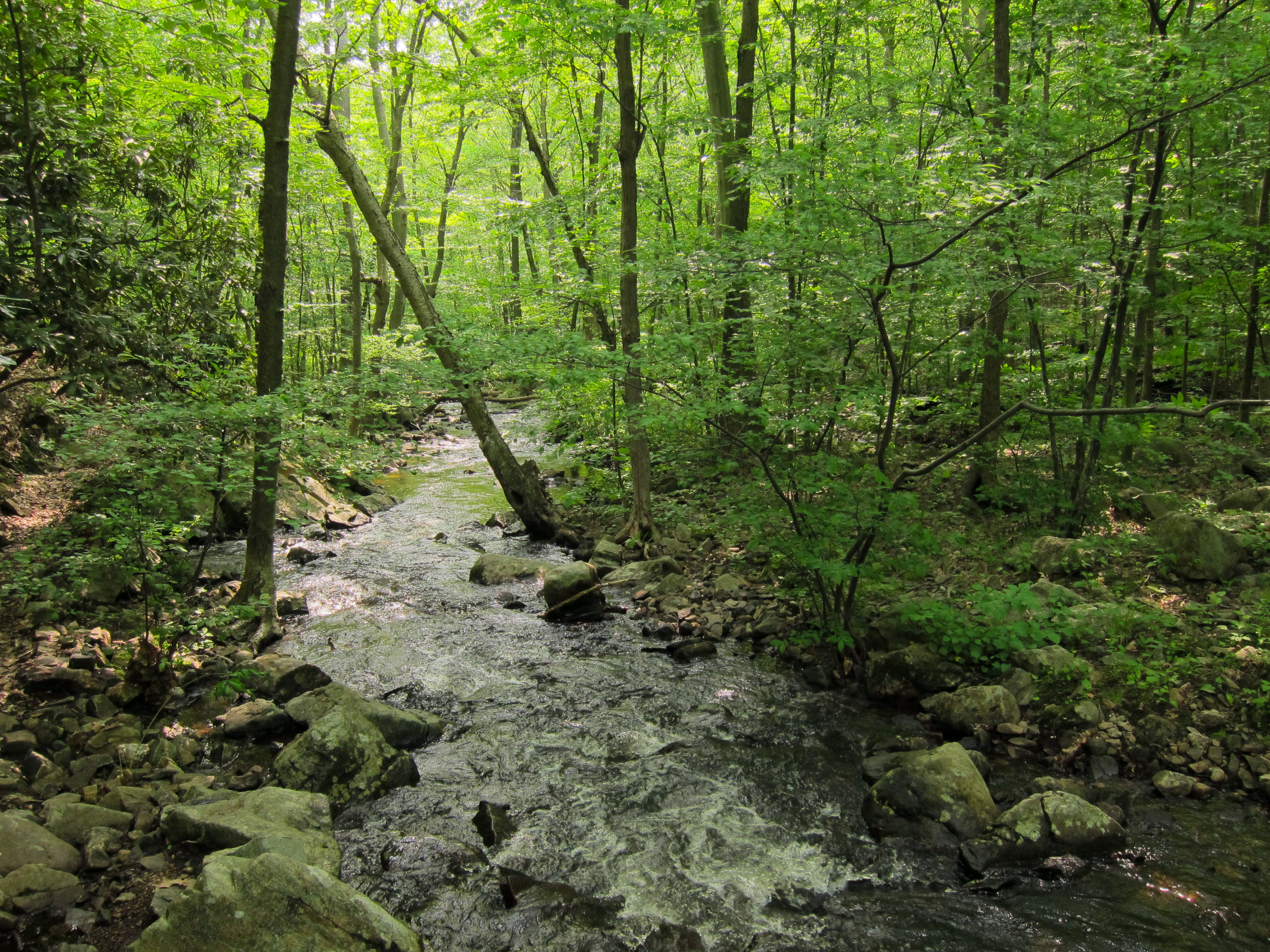
Posts Brook in Norvin Green State Forest

== See also ==
- List of New Jersey state parks
- Highlands Natural Pool
