= Ringwood, New Jersey =

Borough in Passaic County, New Jersey, US

- Borough
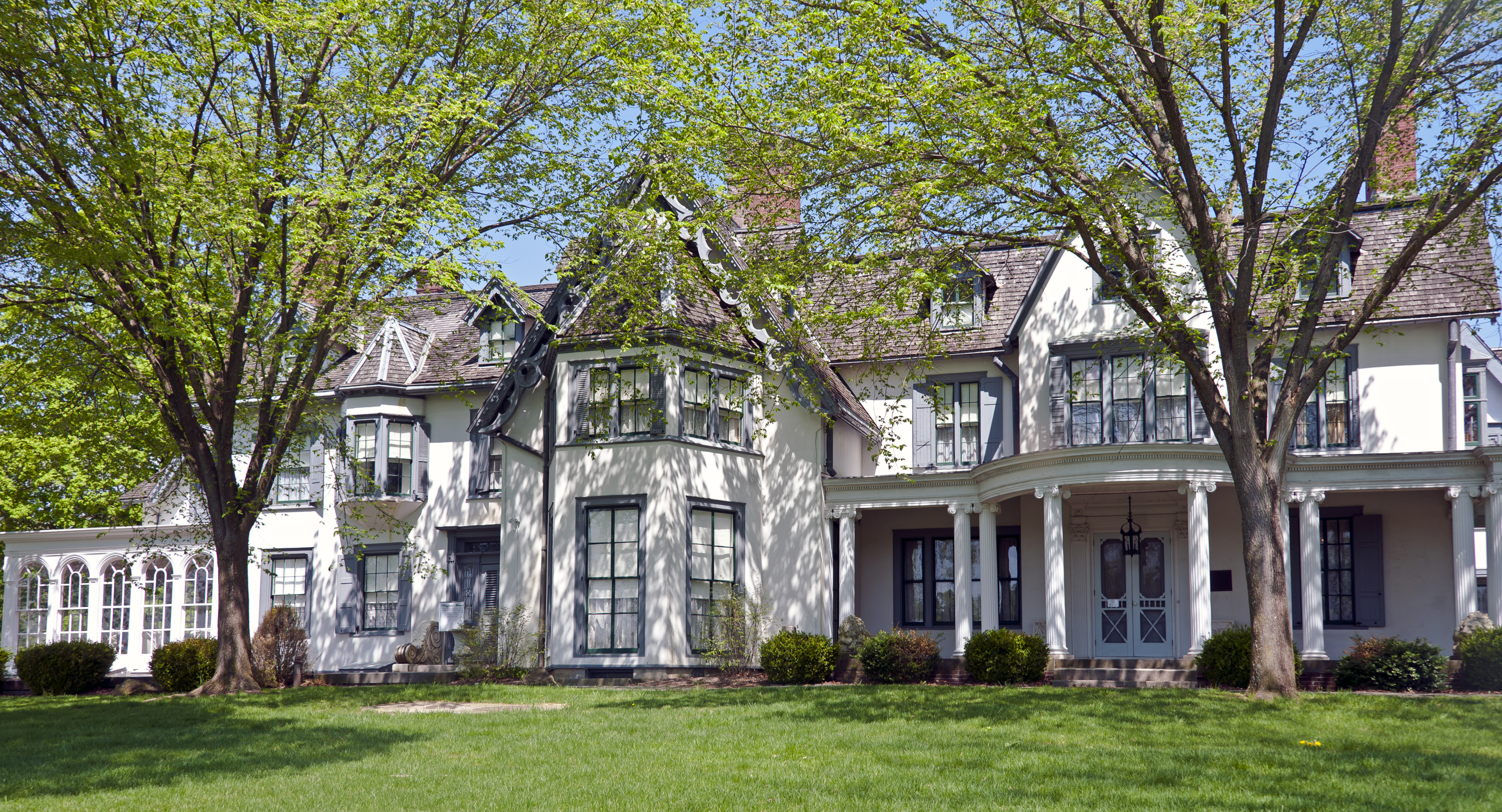
- Ringwood Manor

- Seal

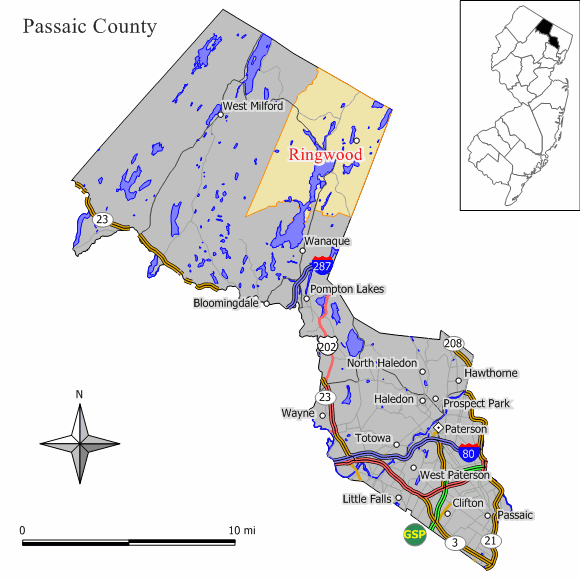
- Map of Ringwood in Passaic County. Inset: Location of Passaic County highlighted in the State of New Jersey.

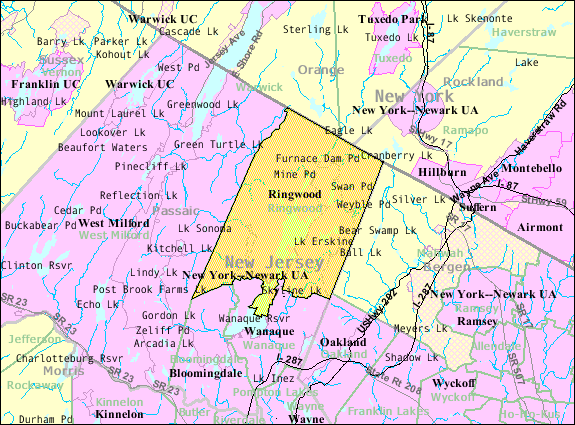
- Census Bureau map of Ringwood, New Jersey

- Location in Passaic County Location in New Jersey Location in the United States
- Coordinates: 41.103963°N 74.271138°W
- Country: United States
- State: New Jersey
- County: Passaic
- Incorporated: March 22, 1918

Government
  - Type: Faulkner Act (council–manager)
  - Body: Borough Council
  - Mayor: Sean T. Noonan (R, term ends December 31, 2023)
  - Borough Manager: Scott Heck
  - Municipal clerk: Nicole Langenmayr

Area
  - Total: 28.49 sq mi (73.80 km^{2})
  - Land: 25.59 sq mi (66.28 km^{2})
  - Water: 2.90 sq mi (7.52 km^{2}) 10.20%
  - Rank: 95th of 565 in state 2nd of 16 in county
- Elevation: 282 ft (86 m)

Population (2020)
  - Total: 11,735
  - Estimate (2023): 11,451
  - Rank: 215th of 565 in state 9th of 16 in county
  - Density: 458.6/sq mi (177.1/km^{2})
  - Rank: 444th of 565 in state 15th of 16 in county
- Time zone: UTC−05:00 (Eastern (EST))
  - Summer (DST): UTC−04:00 (Eastern (EDT))
- ZIP Code: 07456
- Area code: 973 exchange: 962
- FIPS code: 3403163150
- GNIS feature ID: 0885370
- Website: www.ringwoodnj.net

Ringwood is a borough in Passaic County, in the U.S. state of New Jersey. As of the 2020 United States census, the borough's population was 11,735, a decrease of 493 (−4.0%) from the 2010 census count of 12,228, which in turn reflected a decrease of 168 (−1.4%) from the 12,396 counted in the 2000 census.

It is the home of Ringwood State Park which contains the New Jersey Botanical Garden at Skylands (plus Skylands Manor), the Shepherd Lake Recreation Area and historic Ringwood Manor.

The Borough of Ringwood was incorporated by an act of the New Jersey Legislature on February 23, 1918, from a "portion of the Township of Pompton", as one of three boroughs formed from Pompton Township, joining Bloomingdale and Wanaque, based on the results of a referendum held on March 22, 1918. The first organizational meeting of the borough council took place in the existing Borough Hall on May 6, 1918. The borough was named for an iron mining company in the area.

== History ==
The Lenape, an Algonquian language-speaking tribe of Native Americans who occupied much of the mid-Atlantic coastal areas and the interior mountains including along the Delaware River resided in the area of present-day Ringwood when Europeans first entered the area. Some retreated to the mountains to escape colonial encroachment.

Colonists called the local band the Ramapough, and named the Ramapo River and other regional features after them. Their descendants and Afro-Dutch migrants from New York were among the people who formed the multiracial group known as the Ramapough Mountain Indians, recognized in 1980 as the "Ramapough Lenape Nation" Native American tribe by the state of New Jersey, though the federal government has denied their application for formal recognition.

Early in the 18th century, colonists discovered iron in the area. The Ogden family built a blast furnace in Ringwood in 1742. By 1765, Peter Hasenclever used Ringwood as the center of his ironmaking operations, which included 150,000 acres (610 km^{2}) in New Jersey, New York and Nova Scotia. Iron mining was prominent in the area from the 18th century until the Great Depression, and iron shafts and pits, landfills and other elements still exist. The London, Roomy, Peters and Hope mines were all originally opened by Peter Hasenclever's London Company.

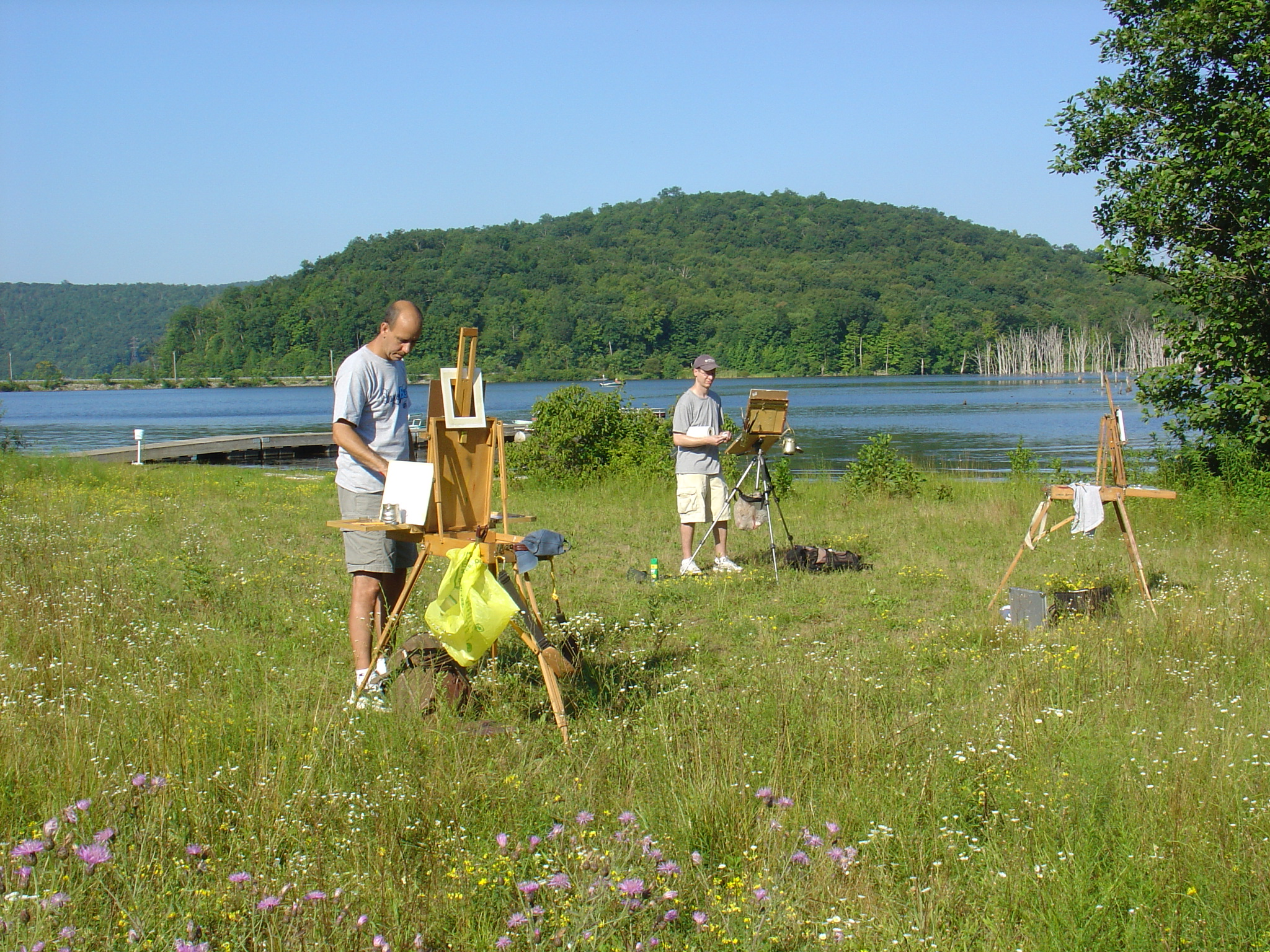
Plein air painters painting at Long Pond in Ringwood, NJ.

A number of well-known ironmasters owned and lived at Ringwood Manor from the 1740s to the late 19th century. During the American Revolutionary War, Robert Erskine managed ironmaking operations from Ringwood, and became George Washington's first geographer and Surveyor-General, producing maps for the Continental Army. Washington visited the Manor House several times. Ringwood iron was used in the famous Hudson River Chain, and for tools and hardware for the army. One of the Manor's last owners was Abram S. Hewitt, ironmaster, educator, lawyer, U.S. Congressman, and Mayor of New York City. The Manor is part of a National Historic Landmark District.

== Geography ==
According to the United States Census Bureau, Ringwood had a total area of 28.49 square miles (73.8 km^{2}), including 25.59 square miles (66.3 km^{2}) of land and 2.91 square miles (7.5 km^{2}) of water (10.20%).

Unincorporated communities, localities and place names located partially or completely within the borough include Brushwood Pond, Cupsaw Lake, Skyline Lake, Conklintown, Erskine, Harrison Mountain Lake, Lake Erskine, Upper Erskine Lake, Monksville, Negro Pond, Sheppard Pond, Stonetown, Upper Lake and Weyble Pond.

The borough borders Bloomingdale, Wanaque and West Milford in Passaic County; Mahwah and Oakland in Bergen County; Tuxedo and Warwick in Orange County, New York; and Ramapo in Rockland County, New York.

The town is split by the Wanaque Reservoir, which provides water to urban areas in Northeastern New Jersey.

=== Climate ===
Ringwood has a hot summer continental climate (Köppen climate classification Dfa).

Climate data for Ringwood, New Jersey
Month	Jan	Feb	Mar	Apr	May	Jun	Jul	Aug	Sep	Oct	Nov	Dec	Year
Mean daily maximum °F (°C)	36 (2)	40 (4)	47 (8)	60 (16)	70 (21)	79 (26)	84 (29)	82 (28)	74 (23)	63 (17)	53 (12)	42 (6)	61 (16)
Mean daily minimum °F (°C)	19 (−7)	21 (−6)	29 (−2)	40 (4)	49 (9)	58 (14)	64 (18)	62 (17)	54 (12)	43 (6)	35 (2)	26 (−3)	42 (5)
Average precipitation inches (mm)	3.11 (79)	2.99 (76)	3.85 (98)	4.21 (107)	4.09 (104)	4.64 (118)	4.42 (112)	4.41 (112)	4.42 (112)	4.49 (114)	4.06 (103)	3.92 (100)	48.61 (1,235)

== Demographics ==
Historical population
Census	Pop.	Note	%±
1920	1,025		—
1930	1,038		1.3%
1940	977		−5.9%
1950	1,752		79.3%
1960	4,182		138.7%
1970	10,393		148.5%
1980	12,625		21.5%
1990	12,623		0.0%
2000	12,396		−1.8%
2010	12,228		−1.4%
2020	11,735		−4.0%
2023 (est.)	11,451	▼	−2.4%
Population sources: 1920; 1920–1930 1940–2000; 2000 2010 2020

=== 2020 census ===
As of the 2020 census, Ringwood had a population of 11,735. The median age was 45.0 years. 20.3% of residents were under the age of 18 and 18.3% of residents were 65 years of age or older. For every 100 females there were 99.5 males, and for every 100 females age 18 and over there were 98.1 males age 18 and over.

74.0% of residents lived in urban areas, while 26.0% lived in rural areas.

There were 4,180 households in Ringwood, of which 33.0% had children under the age of 18 living in them. Of all households, 67.9% were married-couple households, 11.5% were households with a male householder and no spouse or partner present, and 16.1% were households with a female householder and no spouse or partner present. About 14.8% of all households were made up of individuals and 7.2% had someone living alone who was 65 years of age or older.

There were 4,364 housing units, of which 4.2% were vacant. The homeowner vacancy rate was 1.5% and the rental vacancy rate was 3.3%.

Racial composition as of the 2020 census
Race	Number	Percent
White	9,906	84.4%
Black or African American	184	1.6%
American Indian and Alaska Native	115	1.0%
Asian	202	1.7%
Native Hawaiian and Other Pacific Islander	1	0.0%
Some other race	284	2.4%
Two or more races	1,043	8.9%
Hispanic or Latino (of any race)	1,084	9.2%

=== 2010 census ===
The 2010 United States census counted 12,228 people, 4,182 households, and 3,413 families in the borough. The population density was 485.0 per square mile (187.3/km^{2}). There were 4,331 housing units at an average density of 171.8 per square mile (66.3/km^{2}). The racial makeup was 92.58% (11,321) White, 1.36% (166) Black or African American, 1.24% (152) Native American, 1.74% (213) Asian, 0.02% (2) Pacific Islander, 1.18% (144) from other races, and 1.88% (230) from two or more races. Hispanic or Latino of any race were 5.78% (707) of the population.

Of the 4,182 households, 37.9% had children under the age of 18; 70.8% were married couples living together; 7.3% had a female householder with no husband present and 18.4% were non-families. Of all households, 14.5% were made up of individuals and 5.1% had someone living alone who was 65 years of age or older. The average household size was 2.90 and the average family size was 3.23.

24.7% of the population were under the age of 18, 7.0% from 18 to 24, 23.7% from 25 to 44, 33.1% from 45 to 64, and 11.3% who were 65 years of age or older. The median age was 42.1 years. For every 100 females, the population had 100.3 males. For every 100 females ages 18 and older there were 97.8 males.

The Census Bureau's 2006–2010 American Community Survey showed that (in 2010 inflation-adjusted dollars) median household income was $109,139 (with a margin of error of +/− $8,896) and the median family income was $117,793 (+/− $9,712). Males had a median income of $70,086 (+/− $9,303) versus $54,397 (+/− $6,682) for females. The per capita income for the borough was $39,931 (+/− $2,197). Estimates of families and population below the poverty line were not available.

Same-sex couples headed 37 households in 2010, an increase from the 26 counted in 2000.

=== 2000 census ===
As of the 2000 United States census there were 12,396 people, 4,108 households, and 3,446 families residing in the borough. The population density was 491.0 people per square mile (189.6 people/km^{2}). There were 4,221 housing units at an average density of 167.2 per square mile (64.6/km^{2}). The racial makeup of the borough was 93.87% White, 1.61% African American, 1.44% Native American, 1.19% Asian, 0.01% Pacific Islander, 0.67% from other races, and 1.21% from two or more races. 4.25% of the population were Hispanic or Latino of any race.

There were 4,108 households, out of which 42.1% had children under the age of 18 living with them, 73.5% were married couples living together, 7.8% had a female householder with no husband present, and 16.1% were non-families. 12.1% of all households were made up of individuals, and 3.6% had someone living alone who was 65 years of age or older. The average household size was 3.00 and the average family size was 3.28.

In the borough the population was spread out, with 27.6% under the age of 18, 6.0% from 18 to 24, 30.7% from 25 to 44, 27.9% from 45 to 64, and 7.9% who were 65 years of age or older. The median age was 37 years. For every 100 females, there were 100.1 males. For every 100 females age 18 and over, there were 95.3 males.

The median income for a household in the borough was $81,636, and the median income for a family was $85,108. Males had a median income of $60,097 versus $36,005 for females. The per capita income for the borough was $31,341. 2.8% of the population and 2.0% of families were below the poverty line. Out of the total population, 3.9% of those under the age of 18 and 2.2% of those 65 and older were living below the poverty line.

== Parks and recreation ==
Ringwood State Park is a 4,444-acre (1,798 ha) state park located in the heart of the Ramapo Mountains. The park consists of four distinct areas: Ringwood Manor, Skylands Manor/NJ State Botanical Garden, Shepherd Lake, and Bear Swamp Lake.

Norvin Green State Forest covers 5,416 acres (2,192 ha) in parts of Ringwood, as well as portions of Bloomingdale and West Milford.

Tranquility Ridge Park is a county park covering more than 2,000 acres (810 ha) of wooded land on the border of Ringwood and West Milford that was acquired by the county to preserve the property from development.

The New Weis Center is an environmental education, arts and recreation center located at 150 Snake Den Road.

Spring Lake Day Camp is an ACA-accredited summer day camp for children in Kindergarten through 10th grade. The camp was founded in 1989 and has been family owned and operated since its opening.

The Highlands Natural Pool is an Olympic size, stream-fed freshwater pool that was carved and founded in 1935 by The Nature Friends, a group of residents who enjoyed working on recreational projects for the local community.

== Law and government ==
=== Local government ===
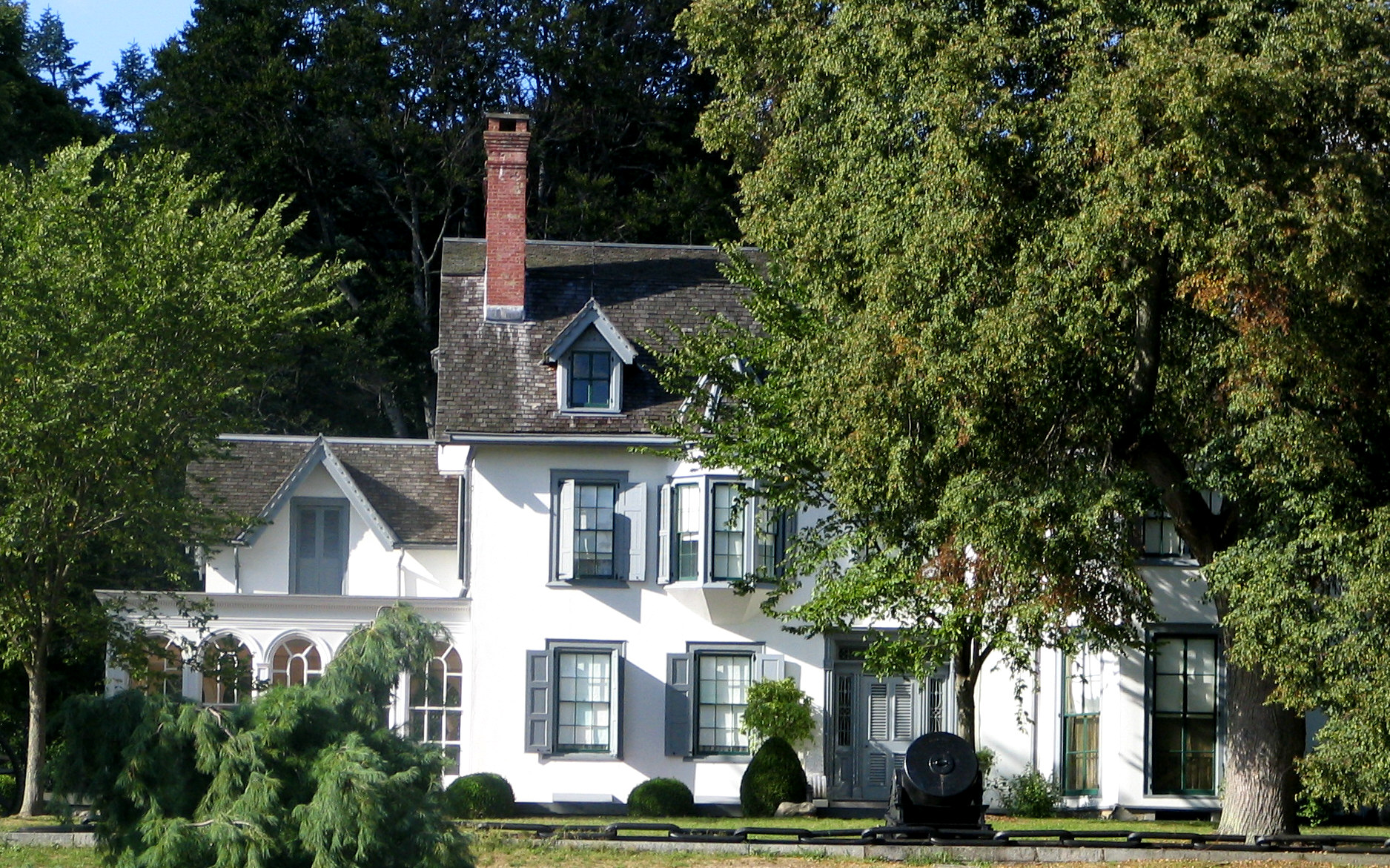
Ringwood Manor, with a mortar and part of the Hudson River Chain

Ringwood operates within the Faulkner Act (formally known as the Optional Municipal Charter Law) under the Council-Manager form of municipal government Plan E, implemented based on the recommendations of a Charter Study Commission as of January 1, 1979. The borough is one of 71 municipalities (of the 564) statewide that use this form of government. The borough's governing body is comprised of a seven-member borough council whose members are elected at-large in partisan elections to serve four-year terms of office on a staggered basis, with either three or four seats coming up for election in odd-numbered years as part of the November general election. At an annual reorganization meeting held each January, the council selects a mayor and a deputy mayor from among its members.

As of 2023, members of the Ringwood Borough Council are Mayor Sean T. Noonan (R, term on council ends December 31, 2025; term as mayor ends 2023), Deputy Mayor Jaime Matteo-Landis (R, term on council and as deputy mayor ends 2023), Stephanie N. Baumgartner (R, 2025), Stephanie A. Forest (R, 2025), Michelle Kerr (R, 2023; elected to serve an unexpired term), Linda M. Schaefer (R, 2023), and John M. Speer (R, 2023).

In January 2022, the borough council appointed Michelle Kerr to fill the seat expiring in December 2023 that had been held by Michael McCracken until he resigned from office. Kerr served on an interim basis until the November 2022 general election, when she was elected to serve the balance of the term of office.

==== Emergency services ====
Ringwood is serviced by a volunteer ambulance corps and three volunteer fire companies, with each fire company covering one section of the borough. The Erskine Lakes Fire Company covers Erskine Lakes, and Cupsaw Lake. Ringwood Volunteer Fire Company #1 (Stonetown) covers Stonetown. and Skyline Lake Fire Department covers Skyline Lake area.

=== Federal, state and county representation ===
Ringwood is located in the 5th Congressional District and is part of New Jersey's 26th state legislative district.

For the 119th United States Congress, New Jersey's 5th congressional district is represented by Josh Gottheimer (D, Wyckoff). New Jersey is represented in the United States Senate by Democrats Cory Booker (Newark, term ends 2027) and Andy Kim (Moorestown, term ends 2031).

For the 2026–2027 session, the 26th legislative district of the New Jersey Legislature is represented in the State Senate by Joseph Pennacchio (R, Rockaway Township) and in the General Assembly by Brian Bergen (R, Denville Township) and Jay Webber (R, Morris Plains).

Passaic County is governed by a Board of County Commissioners, comprised of seven members who are elected at-large to staggered three-year terms office on a partisan basis, with two or three seats coming up for election each year as part of the November general election in a three-year cycle. At a reorganization meeting held in January, the board selects a Director and Deputy Director from among its members to serve for a one-year term. As of 2026, Passaic County's Commissioners are: Director Cassandra "Sandi" Lazzara (D), Little Falls, term as commissioner ends December 31, 2027; term as director ends 2026), Deputy Director Orlando Cruz (D, Paterson, term as commissioner and as deputy director ends 2026), Rodney DeVore (D, Paterson, 2027), Bruce James (D, Clifton, 2026) Michael Ramaglia (D, West Milford, 2028), Christina Schratz (D, Passaic, 2028) and Nick Veliky (D, Clifton, appointed to a term ending in 2027).

Constitutional officers, elected on a countywide basis, are County Clerk Danielle Ireland-Imhof (D, Hawthorne, 2028), Sheriff Thomas Adamo (D, Wayne, 2027) and Surrogate Zoila S. Cassanova (D, Wayne, 2026).

=== Highlands protection ===
In 2004, the New Jersey Legislature passed the Highlands Water Protection and Planning Act, which regulates the New Jersey Highlands region. Ringwood was included in the highlands preservation area and is subject to the rules of the act and the Highlands Water Protection and Planning Council, a division of the New Jersey Department of Environmental Protection. All of the territory in the protected region is classified as being in the highlands preservation area, and thus subject to additional rules.

=== Politics ===
As of March 2011, there were a total of 8,676 registered voters in Ringwood, of which 1,733 (20.0% vs. 31.0% countywide) were registered as Democrats, 2,714 (31.3% vs. 18.7%) were registered as Republicans and 4,225 (48.7% vs. 50.3%) were registered as Unaffiliated. There were 4 voters registered as Libertarians or Greens. Among the borough's 2010 Census population, 71.0% (vs. 53.2% in Passaic County) were registered to vote, including 94.3% of those ages 18 and over (vs. 70.8% countywide).

Gubernatorial election results for Ringwood
Year	Republican		Democratic		Third party(ies)	
Year	No.	%	No.	%	No.	%
2025	3,098	51.44%	2,893	48.03%	32	0.53%
2021	2,916	55.70%	2,263	43.23%	56	1.07%
2017	1,953	47.29%	2,067	50.05%	110	2.66%
2013	2,531	64.81%	1,313	33.62%	61	1.56%
2009	2,573	56.27%	1,714	37.48%	286	6.25%
2005	2,434	53.80%	1,977	43.70%	113	2.50%

In the 2012 presidential election, Republican Mitt Romney received 53.9% of the vote (3,411 cast), ahead of Democrat Barack Obama with 44.0% (2,845 votes), and other candidates with 1.1% (68 votes), among the 6,359 ballots cast by the borough's 8,936 registered voters (35 ballots were spoiled), for a turnout of 71.2%. In the 2008 presidential election, Republican John McCain received 3,667 votes (52.5% vs. 37.7% countywide), ahead of Democrat Barack Obama with 3,146 votes (45.0% vs. 58.8%) and other candidates with 68 votes (1.0% vs. 0.8%), among the 6,985 ballots cast by the borough's 8,922 registered voters, for a turnout of 78.3% (vs. 70.4% in Passaic County). In the 2004 presidential election, Republican George W. Bush received 3,636 votes (54.7% vs. 42.7% countywide), ahead of Democrat John Kerry with 2,897 votes (43.6% vs. 53.9%) and other candidates with 46 votes (0.7% vs. 0.7%), among the 6,647 ballots cast by the borough's 8,372 registered voters, for a turnout of 79.4% (vs. 69.3% in the whole county).

Presidential elections results
Year	Republican	Democratic	Third Parties
2024	54.4% 4,074	43.4% 3,252	2.2% 141
2020	50.6% 3,959	46.5% 3,635	2.9% 150
2016	53.2% 3,536	41.6% 2,767	3.9% 262
2012	53.9% 3,411	44.0% 2,845	1.1% 68
2008	52.5% 3,667	45.0% 3,146	1.0% 68
2004	54.7% 3,636	43.6% 2,897	0.7% 46

In the 2013 gubernatorial election, Republican Chris Christie received 64.8% of the vote (2,531 cast), ahead of Democrat Barbara Buono with 33.6% (1,313 votes), and other candidates with 1.6% (61 votes), among the 3,957 ballots cast by the borough's 9,014 registered voters (52 ballots were spoiled), for a turnout of 43.9%. In the 2009 gubernatorial election, Republican Chris Christie received 2,573 votes (55.9% vs. 43.2% countywide), ahead of Democrat Jon Corzine with 1,714 votes (37.2% vs. 50.8%), Independent Chris Daggett with 236 votes (5.1% vs. 3.8%) and other candidates with 50 votes (1.1% vs. 0.9%), among the 4,606 ballots cast by the borough's 8,696 registered voters, yielding a 53.0% turnout (vs. 42.7% in the county).

United States Senate election results for Ringwood1
Year	Republican		Democratic		Third party(ies)	
Year	No.	%	No.	%	No.	%
2024	3,929	54.46%	3,129	43.37%	157	2.18%
2018	2,913	52.64%	2,375	42.92%	246	4.45%
2012	3,008	52.41%	2,621	45.67%	110	1.92%
2006	2,224	54.48%	1,780	43.61%	78	1.91%

United States Senate election results for Ringwood2
Year	Republican		Democratic		Third party(ies)	
Year	No.	%	No.	%	No.	%
2020	3,861	50.90%	3,564	46.98%	161	2.12%
2014	1,778	53.39%	1,493	44.83%	59	1.77%
2013	1,398	55.02%	1,130	44.47%	13	0.51%
2008	3,368	52.75%	2,882	45.14%	135	2.11%

== Education ==
Students in kindergarten through eighth grade are served by the Ringwood Public School District. As of the 2023–24 school year, the district, comprised of four schools, had an enrollment of 1,019 students and 113.7 classroom teachers (on an FTE basis), for a student–teacher ratio of 9.0:1. Schools in the district (with 2023–24 enrollment data from the National Center for Education Statistics) are Peter Cooper Elementary School with 234 students in grades K–3 (built in 1963), Robert Erskine Elementary School with 171 students in grades K–3 (built in 1960), Eleanor G. Hewitt Intermediate School with 228 students in grades 4–5 (built in 1937 with an annex built in 1952 and trailers added in 1959) and Martin J. Ryerson Middle School with 370 students in grades 6–8 (built in 1970).

Ringwood's public schools are supported in part with grants from the Ringwood Educational Foundation, a not-for-profit organization which sponsors, among other things, the annual Shepherd Lake 5K run.

Students in public school for ninth through twelfth grades attend Lakeland Regional High School in Wanaque, which serves students from the Boroughs of Ringwood and Wanaque. As of the 2023–24 school year, the high school had an enrollment of 847 students and 77.7 classroom teachers (on an FTE basis), for a student–teacher ratio of 10.9:1.

Private schools used to include Ringwood Christian School, which was founded in 1973 through the Ringwood Baptist Church, serves 80 students in kindergarten through eighth grade, with part-time sessions available for pre-schoolers. St. Catherine of Bologna School, a regional Roman Catholic parochial school operating under the supervision of the Roman Catholic Diocese of Paterson that served kindergarten through eighth grade, closed in 2018 due to falling enrollment.

== Community ==
Ringwood residents may be eligible to join one of several private lake communities, based on where they live: assorted lakes in Stonetown, Cupsaw Lake, Erskine Lakes or Skyline Lakes, each of which have annual fees and initiation fees.

Each year on the third Saturday in March, Ringwood holds its annual St. Patrick's Day Parade, the only such parade in Passaic County. Since 1990, the Parade Committee selects a grand marshal and a Citizen of the Year. These chosen outstanding citizens of the community are honored at a Unity Breakfast that precedes the parade. The parade includes bagpipe bands, floats, Irish step dancers, the county sheriff's department with their equestrian unit, local police, and fire and ambulance departments. Other marchers include Girl Scout and Boy Scout troops, local school groups and other recreational teams. The parade ends at the St. Catherine of Bologna Church Parish Center, where the celebration continues with live music and entertainment.

== Transportation ==
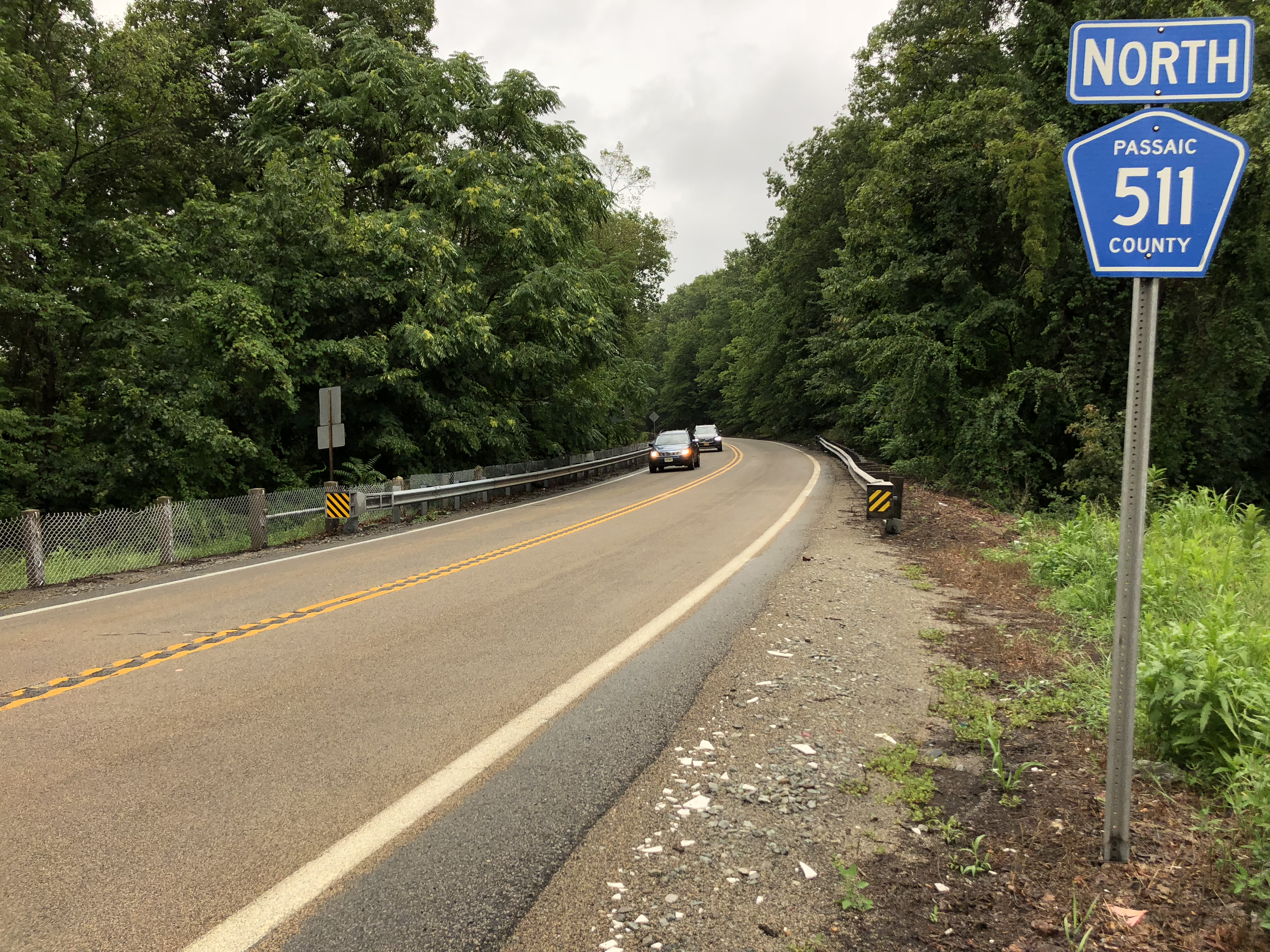
County Route 511 in Ringwood

=== Roads and highways ===
As of May 2010, the borough had a total of 87.52 miles (140.85 km) of roadways, of which 72.73 miles (117.05 km) were maintained by the municipality and 14.79 miles (23.80 km) by Passaic County.

There are no state, U.S., or Interstate highways in Ringwood. The most prominent roads are County Route 511, which follows the Greenwood Lake Turnpike, and County Route 692, which follows Skyline Drive. The nearest major highway is Interstate 287, and both CR 511 and CR 692 have interchanges with it in neighboring Wanaque and Oakland, respectively. Ringwood had no traffic lights until June 2013, when the town's first one was installed at the intersection of Skyline Drive and Erskine Road. The borough still has no sidewalks or street lights.

=== Public transportation ===
NJ Transit bus transportation is available at the Ringwood Park and Ride, located adjacent to Ringwood Public Library. The 196 offers express bus service to and from the Port Authority Bus Terminal in Midtown Manhattan, while the 197 route offers local service, including to the Willowbrook Mall and Willowbrook Park and Ride.

== Notable people ==
People who were born in, residents of, or otherwise closely associated with Ringwood include:

- Robert Erskine (1735–1780), a Scottish inventor and later an American officer in the Continental Army during the American Revolutionary War
- Garrett Gardner, singer and songwriter who finished in the top 12 in season 4 of The Voice
- Carol Habben (1933–1997), center fielder and backup catcher who played in the All-American Girls Professional Baseball League
- Jeff Livesey (born 1966). former professional baseball player and current coach in the Miami Marlins organization
- Wayne Mann, leader of the Ramapough Mountain Indians and lead participant of 600-person mass tort suit against Ford Motor Company for environmental contamination of the Ringwood Mines landfill site
- George Martin (born 1953), former defensive end for the New York Giants
- Sarah Pagano (born 1991), long-distance runner
- John Dyneley Prince (1868–1945), linguist, diplomat, and politician who was a professor at New York University and Columbia University, minister to Denmark and Yugoslavia, and leader of both houses of the New Jersey Legislature
- Kim Rosen (born c. 1980), audio mastering engineer
- Eric Schubert (born 1962), former American football placekicker who played in the NFL for the New York Giants, St. Louis Cardinals and New England Patriots
- Darren Soto (born 1978), member of the Florida House, then the Florida Senate and Congressman from Orlando, Florida
- Francis Lynde Stetson (1846–1920), lawyer and designer of the Botanical Gardens at Skylands Manor

== Sister Cities ==
- Ringwood, Hampshire, England

The mayor of the borough of Ringwood, New Jersey approached Ringwood Town Council in September 1976, advising that the borough had, in recognition of the 750th anniversary of the Ringwood, Hampshire's market carter, resolved that the Hampshire town would become their Sister City. A laminated copy of the resolution was sent and several visits were subsequently exchanged on an official basis.
