= Skyline Drive (New Jersey) =

Skyline Drive
- County Route S-91; County Route 692

Route information
- Maintained by Passaic and Bergen Counties
- Length: 5.84 mi (9.40 km)
- Restrictions: No trucks over 10 tons

Major junctions
- South end: US 202 in Oakland
- I-287 in Oakland
- North end: CR 511 in Ringwood

Location
- Country: United States
- State: New Jersey

Highway system
- New Jersey State Highway Routes; Interstate; US; State; Scenic Byways
← CR S-89	→ CR S-93
← CR 691	→ CR 693

Skyline Drive is a 5.84-mile-long (9.40 km) road in Northern New Jersey, between Interstate 287 (I-287) in Oakland, Bergen County and County Route 511 (CR 511) in Ringwood, Passaic County, passing through Ringwood State Park in the Ramapo Mountains. It is a major route for those in the Ringwood and Wanaque area to get to Interstate 287. The road is also known as County Route S91 in Bergen County and County Route 692 in Passaic County. County Route S91 continues south for 0.73 miles from the southern terminus of Skyline Drive on West Oakland Avenue to U.S. Route 202 (US 202).

The road offers a brief view of the Manhattan skyline, 20 miles (32 km) away, while heading southbound. The steep and narrow road is often impassable in winter due to ice and snow and is as high as 900 ft above sea-level in some places along the route. As of April 1, 2001, the New Jersey Department of Transportation imposed a ban on trucks exceeding 10 tons from using Skyline Drive. This ban follows an incident in December 2000, in which three Ringwood residents were killed by a 40-ton dump truck that had lost control on the roadway and fell to its side.

== Route description ==
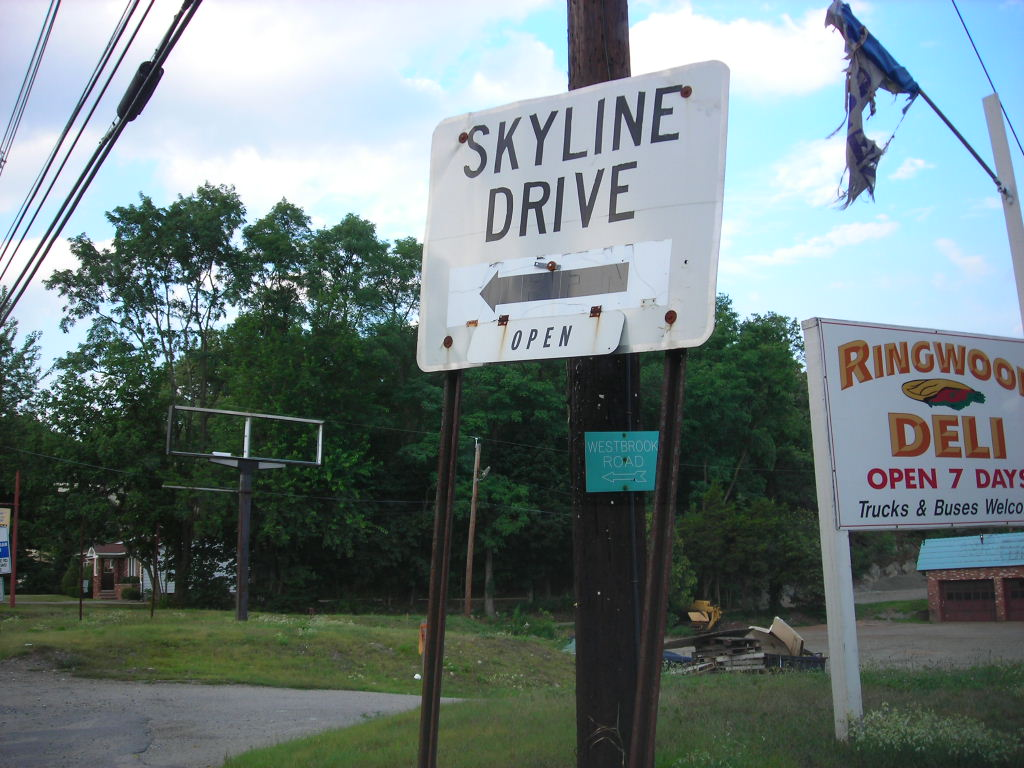
Signage for Skyline Drive along County Route 511 in Ringwood. The open signage mentions Open for the conditions of the roads

County Route S-91 begins at an intersection with U.S. Route 202 (co-signed as Bergen County Route 91 due to county maintenance) in the community of Oakland. The route heads westward as West Oakland Avenue, crossing over the New York, Susquehanna and Western Railway's New Jersey Subdivision line and paralleling to the south of Interstate 287. After intersecting with the ramps from Exit 58 of the interstate, Route S-91 continues westward through a large residential and commercial portion of Oakland. The route crosses over the nearby Ramapo River and continues westward to a traffic light with Skyline Drive in Oakland. At this point, Route S-91 continues northward along Skyline Drive, crossing under the mainline of Interstate 287 and entering the nearby partial cloverleaf interchange. After the interchange, Skyline Drive continues northward and ascends through the nearby woodlands, passing by residences in spurts. The route begins to progress its way to the northwest, crossing into the nearby Ringwood State Park. While traversing the park, Route S-91 and Skyline Drive cross the county line into Passaic County, where the route becomes County Route 692 for a short distance. After making a gradual curve to the northeast, Route 692 crosses back into Bergen County and becomes Route S-91 once again. Continuing a short distance through the state park and after crossing a dirt road, Skyline Drive crosses the county line once again.

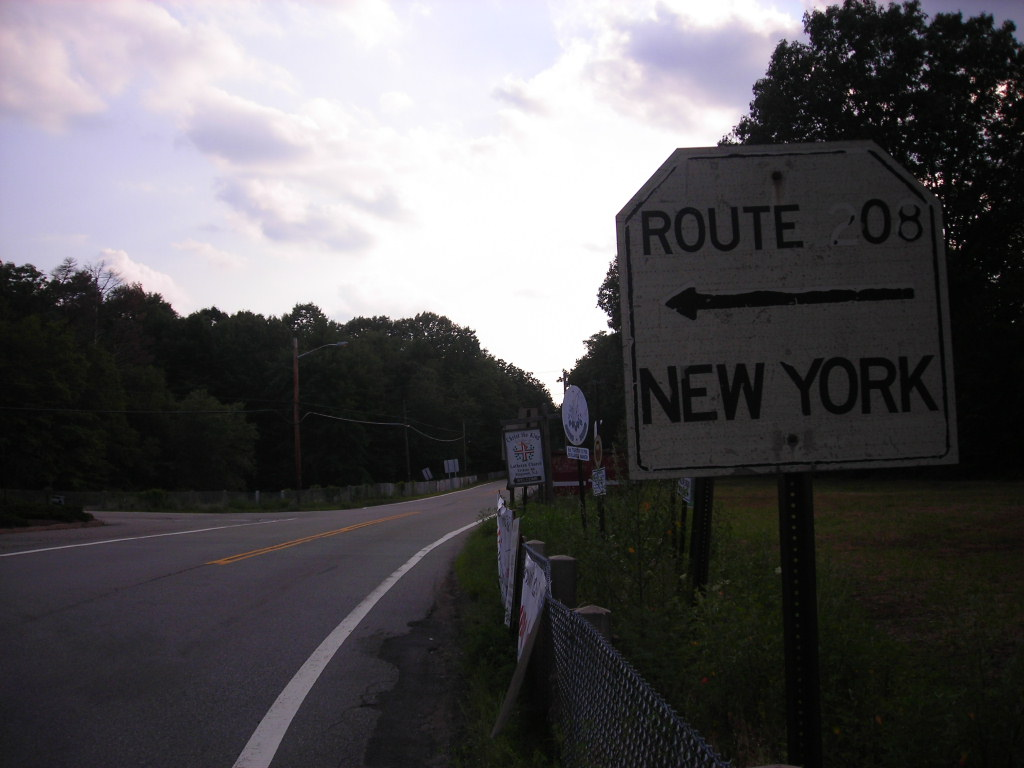
Signage denoting the former alignment of New Jersey Route 208 along Skyline Drive in Ringwood

After crossing back into Passaic County, Skyline Drive (and County Route 692) continue northward through Ringwood State Park before curving its way out of the northern reaches of the park. At this point, the highway enters the borough of Ringwood, where the dense forestry changes back to residences. The route continues through Ringwood, crossing several local streets and turning to the northwest once again. Just before the intersection with Countryside Lane, Skyline Drive turns to the northeast and once again, enters the dense forestry. After crossing through a large residential complex, the highway continues curving its way northward, turning westward one final time at the intersection with Erskine Road. After the curve, Skyline Drive and County Route 692 continue the short stretch westward, terminating at County Route 511 (the Greenwood Lake Turnpike) in the community of Ringwood, near the shores of the Wanaque Reservoir.

== History ==
The corridor of Skyline Drive was first designated to have a state highway in a 1929 amendment to the 1927 highway renumbering, when State Highway Route S-4-B was legislated as a spur of State Highway Route 4, a cross-state highway. This replaced earlier plans that had called for State Highway 3 to service the area, albeit through a more southerly corridor directly through Pompton Lakes. To this end, Skyline Drive was constructed from 1937 through 1940, with plans to eventually become part of Route S4B. At this time, the route in Passaic County carried a designation of CR 164. However, this designation was changed once again after another state highway renumbering in 1953, when it was re-designated as part of State Route 208. The alignment of Route 208 was planned to be upgraded into a limited access freeway through the Wanaque Reservoir and Greenwood Lake northward to the New York state line (to connect with the New York State Route 208's new freeway). There was also to be an interchange with Skyline Drive and West Oakland Avenue near the current interchange with Interstate 287. The $66.3 million project was canceled in the 1970s due to costs and environmental concerns.

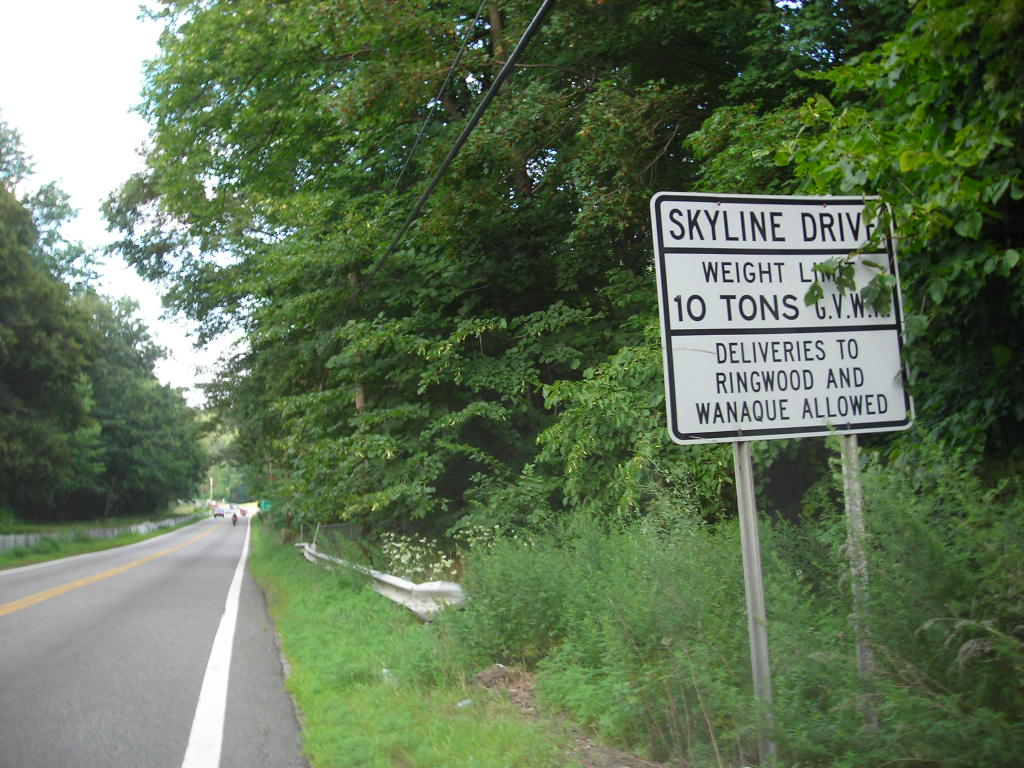
Signage denoting the Skyline Drive truck limits

After being extended to West Oakland Avenue, Route 208 ended near Skyline Drive, where drivers could continue northward to Ringwood and Erskine. The alignment of Route 208 remained along Skyline Drive during the 1960s, and was truncated in 1993 with the completion of Interstate 287. Route 208 was truncated to its current terminus with Interstate 287 in Oakland. After a massive accident with a dump truck in December 2000, the New Jersey Department of Transportation passed rules banning trucks from using Skyline Drive in April 2001, to 10-ton limits. The ban however, did not include buses.

== Major intersections ==
County	Location	mi	km	Destinations	Notes
Bergen	Oakland	0.00	0.00	US 202 / CR 91 (Ramapo Valley Road)	Southern terminus of Skyline Drive and County Route S-91
Bergen	Oakland	0.73	1.17	I-287 to Route 208 south / US 202	Exit 57 (Interstate 287)
Passaic	Ringwood	5.84	9.40	CR 511 (Greenwood Lake Turnpike) – Wanaque, West Milford	Northern terminus of Skyline Drive and County Route 692
1.000 mi = 1.609 km; 1.000 km = 0.621 mi
