= Mike Pagliarulo =

American baseball player (born 1960)

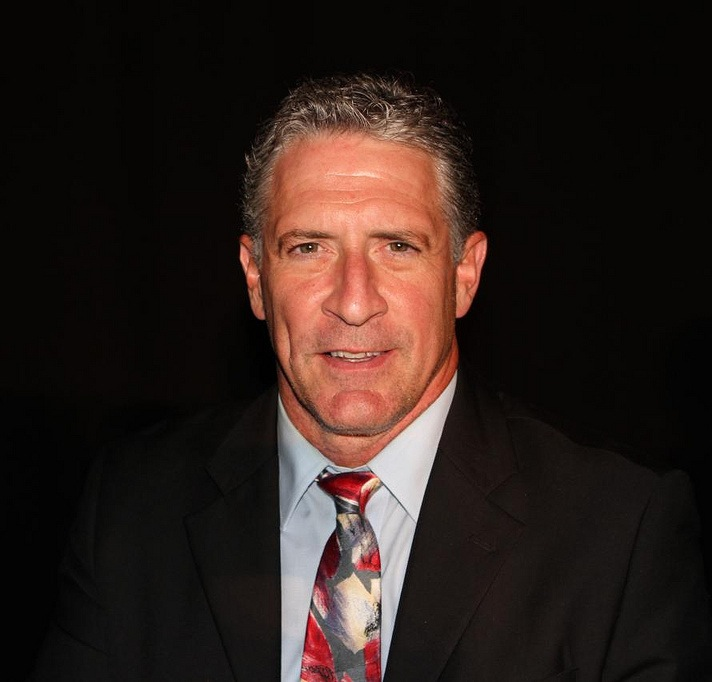
- Pagliarulo in 2011
- Third baseman
- Born: March 15, 1960 (age 66); Medford, Massachusetts, U.S.
- Batted: Left Threw: Right

Professional debut
- MLB: July 7, 1984, for the New York Yankees
- NPB: April 9, 1994, for the Seibu Lions

Last appearance
- NPB: August 5, 1994, for the Seibu Lions
- MLB: October 1, 1995, for the Texas Rangers

MLB statistics
- Batting average: .241
- Home runs: 134
- Runs batted in: 505

NPB statistics
- Batting average: .263
- Home runs: 7
- Runs batted in: 47
- Stats at Baseball Reference

Teams
- New York Yankees (1984–1989); San Diego Padres (1989–1990); Minnesota Twins (1991–1993); Baltimore Orioles (1993); Seibu Lions (1994); Texas Rangers (1995)

Career highlights and awards
- World Series champion (1991)

Michael Timothy Pagliarulo, a.k.a. "Pags" (/pɑːliːəˈruloʊ/ pah-lee-ə-ROO-loh; born March 15, 1960), is an American former professional baseball third baseman. He played in Major League Baseball (MLB) for the New York Yankees, San Diego Padres, Minnesota Twins, Baltimore Orioles, and Texas Rangers, and in Nippon Professional Baseball (NPB) for the Seibu Lions. He also later served as the hitting coach of the Miami Marlins.

== Playing career ==
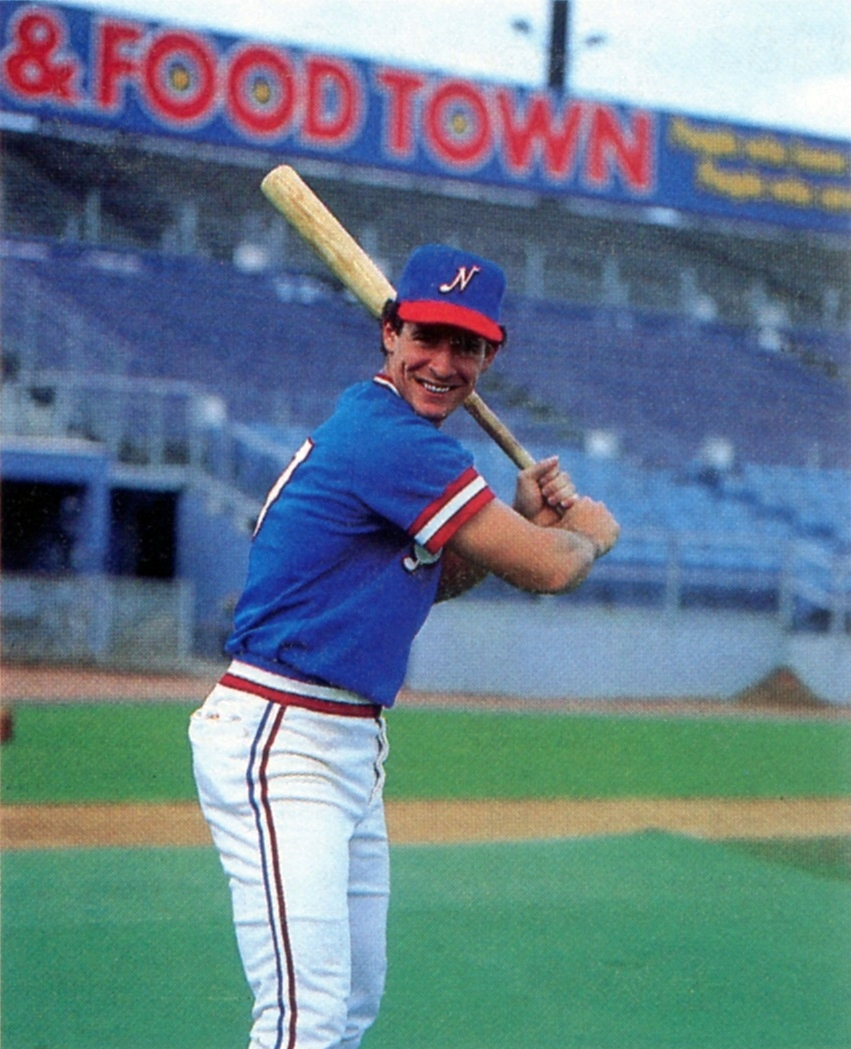
Pagliarulo with the Nashville Sounds in 1983

Pagliarulo graduated from Medford High School in Massachusetts in 1978 and played college baseball at the University of Miami for the Miami Hurricanes. In 1980, he played collegiate summer baseball with the Chatham A's of the Cape Cod Baseball League. He was drafted by the New York Yankees in sixth round of the 1981 Major League Baseball draft.

Pagliarulo joined the parent club on July 1, 1984, and spent just over five years with the Yankees before going to the San Diego Padres in 1989. Although not a high average hitter, Pagliarulo was a long ball specialist as he belted 19 in 1985, 28 in 1986 and a career high of 32 in 1987 with outstanding defensive skills to go along. That promptly drew comparisons with former great Yankee third baseman Graig Nettles. But Pagliarulo never quite lived up to expectation, as he never came close to those numbers again. After hitting 15 homeruns in 1988 and 4 in 1989 in 74 games, he was traded to the San Diego Padres. After a year and a half in San Diego, Pagliarulo moved back to the American League when he joined the Minnesota Twins just before the start of the 1991 season. It was with Minnesota that Pagliarulo won his only World Series championship as the starting third baseman in 1991. Pagliarulo remained with Minnesota for the following 1992 season and part of the 1993 season. He was acquired by the Orioles on August 15, 1993, in a transaction that was completed the following day when Erik Schullstrom was sent to the Twins. At the time, the Orioles needed depth at third base with Leo Gómez on the disabled list but had been unsuccessful in its pursuit of the Cincinnati Reds' Chris Sabo.

Pagliarulo was out of Major League Baseball in 1994, playing for the NPB Pacific League's Seibu Lions, where he was a teammate of current Lions manager Tsutomu Ito. The team clinched the Pacific League with a 76-52-2 record (games are limited to 12 innings, except in the Japan Series, which was 15 in 1994). In the Japan Series, Pagliarulo's Seibu team faced the Yomiuri Giants, featuring his 1991 Twins teammate Dan Gladden in a side story where either player could win another championship. The Giants, featuring 20-year old Hideki Matsui (who in 2009 also won championships on both sides of the Pacific Ocean), won the Fall Classic, 4-2.

At the age of 35, Pagliarulo resumed his career when he signed with the Texas Rangers, where he finished his career before retiring after the 1995 season.

== Coaching career ==
Before the 1998 season, Pagliarulo turned down multiple minor league contracts and big league coaching job offers in order to stay with his family in Massachusetts and coach at Winchester High School.

From 2013–13, Pagilarulo served as the hitting coach for Triple-A Indianapolis Indians.

In 2016, the Miami Marlins hired Pagliarulo as their hitting coach. Pagilarulo was fired from that position in April 2019.

== Personal life ==
Mike married his high school sweetheart and best friend Karen in 1983. They have two kids, Michael and Erica.

His son, Michael, was a member of the 2009 Ivy League champion Dartmouth Big Green baseball team.

His daughter, Erica, was the leading scorer for the Rollins College Women’s Lacrosse team’s most successful season in program history.

| Preceded by Barry Bonds | Miami Marlins hitting coach 2017-2019 | Succeeded by Jeff Livesey |
