= County Route 511 (New Jersey) =

County highway in New Jersey, U.S.

County Route 511
- CR 511 highlighted in red, and CR 511 Alt. in blue

Route information
- Length: 37.44 mi (60.25 km)
- Existed: 1952–present

Major junctions
- South end: CR 510 in Morris Township
- Route 24 in Morris Township; Route 10 in Hanover Township; I-287 / US 46 in Parsippany-Troy Hills; Route 23 in Butler; CR 513 in West Milford
- North end: NY 210 at the New York state line

Location
- Country: United States
- State: New Jersey
- Counties: Morris, Passaic

Highway system
- County routes in New Jersey; 500-series routes
| ← CR 510 | → CR 512 |

County Route 511 (CR 511) is a county highway in the U.S. state of New Jersey. The highway extends 37.44 miles (60.25 km) from Columbia Avenue (CR 510) in Morris Township to the New York state line in West Milford where the road continues as New York State Route 210.

== Route description ==
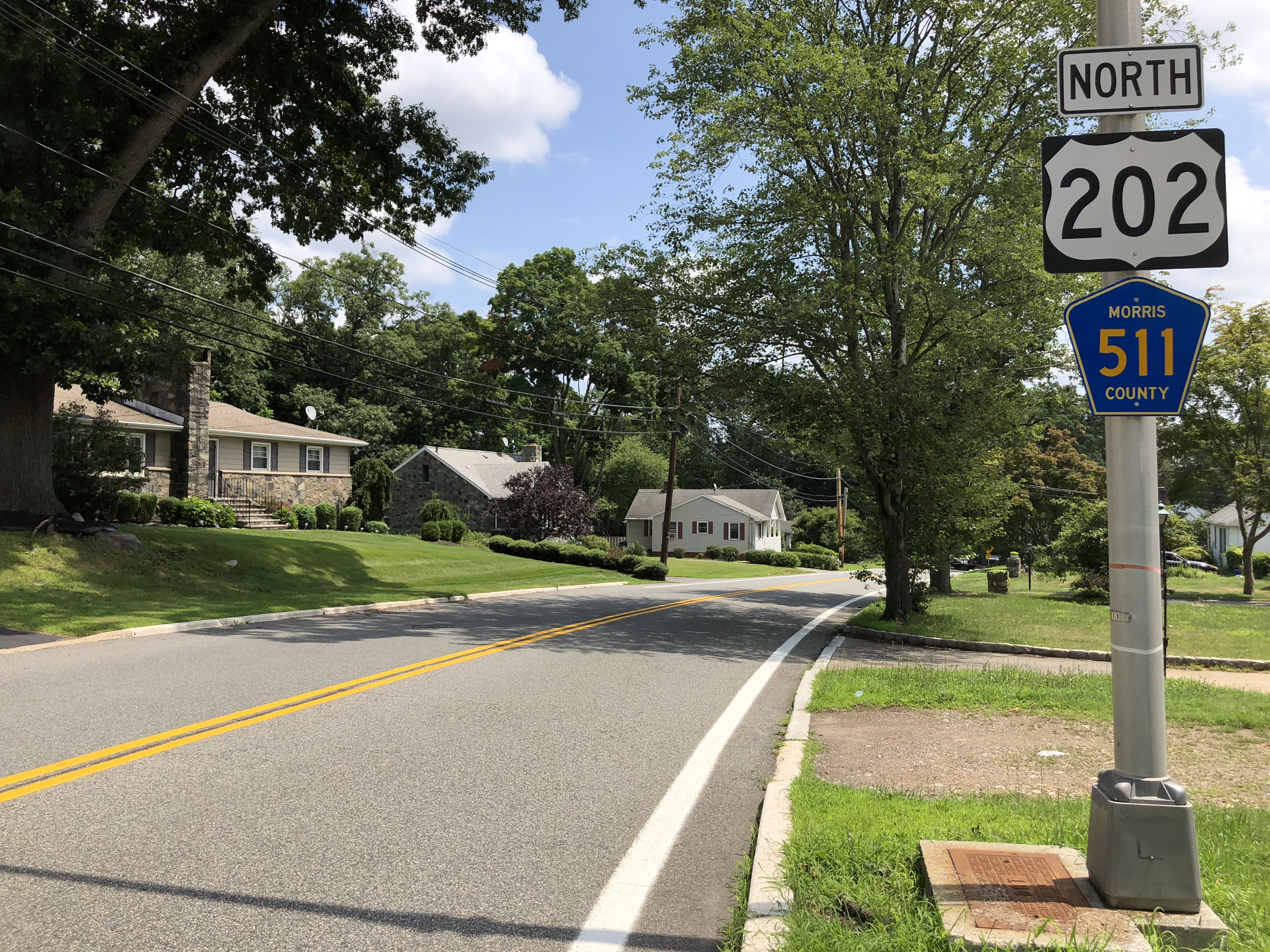
US 202/CR 511 northbound on Intervale Road past I-287 in Parsippany-Troy Hills

CR 511 begins at an intersection with CR 510 in Morris Township, Morris County, heading northeast on four-lane undivided Whippany Road. The route passes business parks before running between business parks to the northwest and homes to the southeast. The road widens into a divided highway and comes to the CR 650 intersection, where it forms the border between Hanover Township to the northwest and Morris Township to the southeast as it interchanges with the Route 24 freeway. CR 511 turns east into residential neighborhoods as an undivided road, becoming a divided highway again briefly as it comes to the CR 623 junction. At this point, the route fully enters Hanover Township and heads northeast past more homes, alternating between a four-lane divided and undivided road. CR 511 splits from Whippany Road by turning northwest onto two-lane Parsippany Road, with CR 622 continuing northeast along Whippany Road. The road turns north and passes over the Whippany River and crosses the Morristown and Erie Railway's Whippany Line at-grade before intersecting CR 622 Alternate and coming to an interchange with Route 10. Past this interchange, the road runs through wooded neighborhoods before entering Parsippany-Troy Hills. At this point, CR 511 widens to four lanes and passes business parks, briefly widening into a divided highway. The route narrows into a two-lane undivided road as it interchanges with I-287 and passes through residential and commercial areas a short distance to the east of Lake Parsippany. CR 511 widens back to four lanes passes more business parks prior to coming to a bridge over I-80 and reaching an intersection with US 202 and CR 630, where CR 511 forms a concurrency with US 202.

The two routes continue north on Parsippany Boulevard, a two-lane road that comes to an intersection with US 46, where the road is briefly state maintained. Past US 46, the road continues north, intersecting ramps that provide access to and from southbound I-287. Here, the road becomes county maintained again. It passes by business parks and then wooded residential areas, closely paralleling I-287 again. At the intersection with Intervale Road, US 202 and CR 511 make a right turn, immediately interchanging with I-287, with access to the southbound direction and from the northbound direction. The routes follow Intervale Road briefly before making a left turn to resume onto Parsippany Boulevard. The road crosses over the Jersey City Reservoir, which supplies drinking water to Jersey City, and enters Boonton, where the road becomes Washington Street. This street carries the two routes through residential areas before coming to another interchange with I-287 that also features access to the southbound direction and access from the northbound direction. Past this interchange, US 202 splits from CR 511 by heading to the northeast on Myrtle Avenue.

Past US 202, CR 511 continues northwest on Main Street and passes over NJ Transit's Montclair-Boonton Line near the Boonton Station before passing through the commercial downtown of Boonton. CR 511 splits from Main Street by turning north onto Boonton Avenue, with CR 624 continuing along Main Street. The road continues past homes before crossing into Boonton Township, where the route turns north into wooded mountain areas with some homes. The route continues north into Montville and turns northeast into less developed mountains, running to the east of the Taylortown Reservoir as it crosses into Kinnelon. In Kinnelon, CR 511 heads near wooded areas of residences, turning east near Fayson Lakes before winding north. The road enters Butler and reaches a junction with Route 23 in commercial areas. From here, the route continues past homes and some businesses, reaching the commercial downtown of Butler. In this area, CR 511 splits into a one-way pair, with the northbound direction turning east on Carey Avenue, north on Roberts Street, and west on High Street, and the southbound direction remaining on Boonton Avenue. At the north end of the one-way pair, the route intersects CR 618. After crossing the New York, Susquehanna and Western Railway's New Jersey Subdivision line, CR 511 turns east onto Main Street and passes more downtown businesses.

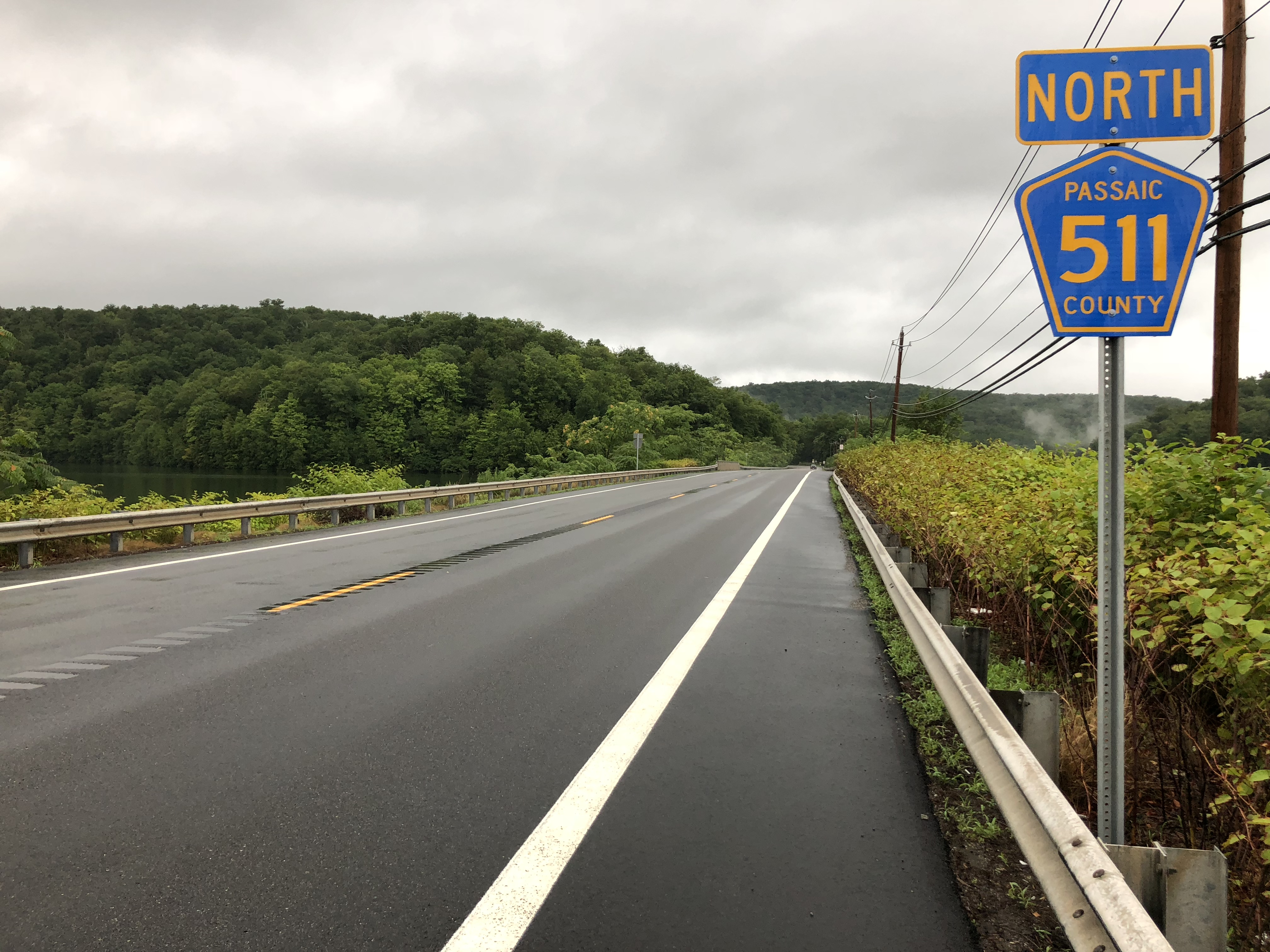
View north along CR 511 crossing the Monksville Reservoir in West Milford

Upon crossing the Pequannock River, CR 511 enters Bloomingdale in Passaic County and immediately intersects CR 694, becoming the Paterson-Hamburg Turnpike. The route passes homes and businesses in the downtown of Bloomingdale before CR 511 turns north onto Union Avenue, with CR 694 continuing east on the Paterson-Hamburg Turnpike. The road continues north past residential areas, heading northeast into more wooded areas with some homes. The route runs to the north of a lake and crosses into Wanaque, heading east into commercial areas and reaching ramps to and from the southbound lanes of I-287 prior to a junction with the northern terminus of CR 511 Alternate. At this point, CR 511 turns north onto Ringwood Avenue and passes a mix of residences and businesses. Farther north, the road passes more development as it runs a short distance to the east of the Wanaque Reservoir. The route heads into more wooded areas of development as it forms the border between Ringwood to the east and Wanaque to the west before completely entering Ringwood. In Ringwood, CR 511 enters dense mountain forests and winds along the eastern shore of the Wanaque Reservoir as Greenwood Lake Turnpike, intersecting Skyline Drive (CR 692) and CR 697. After the intersection with the latter, the road turns northwest and crosses over a few branches of the Wanaque Reservoir. The route curves north away from the reservoir and passes a few businesses as it comes to a junction with CR 698. From here, CR 511 turns northwest into more mountainous areas and enters West Milford, crossing the Wanaque River near the northern end of the Wanaque Reservoir. The road winds west through more rural areas with occasional homes and businesses before reaching the CR 696 intersection. Here, CR 511 makes a turn north and enters more dense commercial development as it comes to the intersection with the northern terminus of CR 513. The route passes more businesses as it begins to run along the western shore of Greenwood Lake, curving northwest prior to turning northeast and running through wooded residential areas along the lake. CR 511 continues along the lakeshore to the New York border, where the road continues into that state as NY 210.

== History ==
The northernmost part of present-day CR 511 near the New York border was made as the Ringwood and Long Pond Turnpike, running from Ringwood to the New York state line. West of Greenwood Lake, the road is now known as the Warwick Turnpike.

North of Pompton Lakes, what is now CR 511 was legislated in the 1927 New Jersey state highway renumbering to be the northernmost part of Route 3. In 1929, this segment of Route 3 was amended to be the northernmost part of Route S4B, a spur of Route 4. This part of road was never built as a state highway.

== Major intersections ==
| County | Location | mi | km | Destinations | Notes |
|---|---|---|---|---|---|
| Morris | Morris Township | 0.00 | 0.00 | CR 510 (Whippany Road) | Southern terminus |
| Morris | Morris Township | 1.06 | 1.71 | Route 24 east – Madison | Exit 1 on Route 24 |
| Morris | Hanover Township | 3.29 | 5.29 | Route 10 – Ledgewood | Interchange |
| Morris | Parsippany-Troy Hills | 5.16 | 8.30 | I-287 – Boonton, Singac, Morristown | Exit 40 on I-287 |
| Morris | Parsippany-Troy Hills | 6.30 | 10.14 | US 202 south (Littleton Road) | Southern end of US 202 concurrency |
| Morris | Parsippany-Troy Hills | 6.69 | 10.77 | US 46 – Dover, Clifton | |
| Morris | Parsippany-Troy Hills | 6.98 | 11.23 | I-287 south – Morristown | Exit 42 on I-287 |
| Morris | Parsippany-Troy Hills | 8.32 | 13.39 | I-287 south to I-80 – Morristown | Exit 43 on I-287 |
| Morris | Boonton | 9.38 | 15.10 | I-287 south | Exit 44 on I-287 |
| Morris | Boonton | 9.39 | 15.11 | US 202 north (Myrtle Avenue) | Northern end of US 202 concurrency |
| Morris | Butler | 17.11 | 27.54 | Route 23 – Sussex, Newark | |
| Passaic | Wanaque | 21.01 | 33.81 | I-287 south | Exit 55 on I-287 |
| Passaic | Wanaque | 21.13 | 34.01 | CR 511 Alt. south (Ringwood Avenue) | Northern terminus of CR 511 Alt. |
| Passaic | West Milford | 34.90 | 56.17 | CR 513 south (Union Valley Road) – Upper Greenwood Lake, Warwick, NY | Northern terminus of CR 513 |
| Passaic | West Milford | 37.44 | 60.25 | NY 210 north – Greenwood Lake | Continuation into New York |
1.000 mi = 1.609 km; 1.000 km = 0.621 mi: Concurrency terminus; Incomplete access

== CR 511 Alternate ==
County Route 511 Alternate
- Location: Wayne–Wanaque
- Length: 9.77 mi (15.72 km)
- Existed: 1952–present

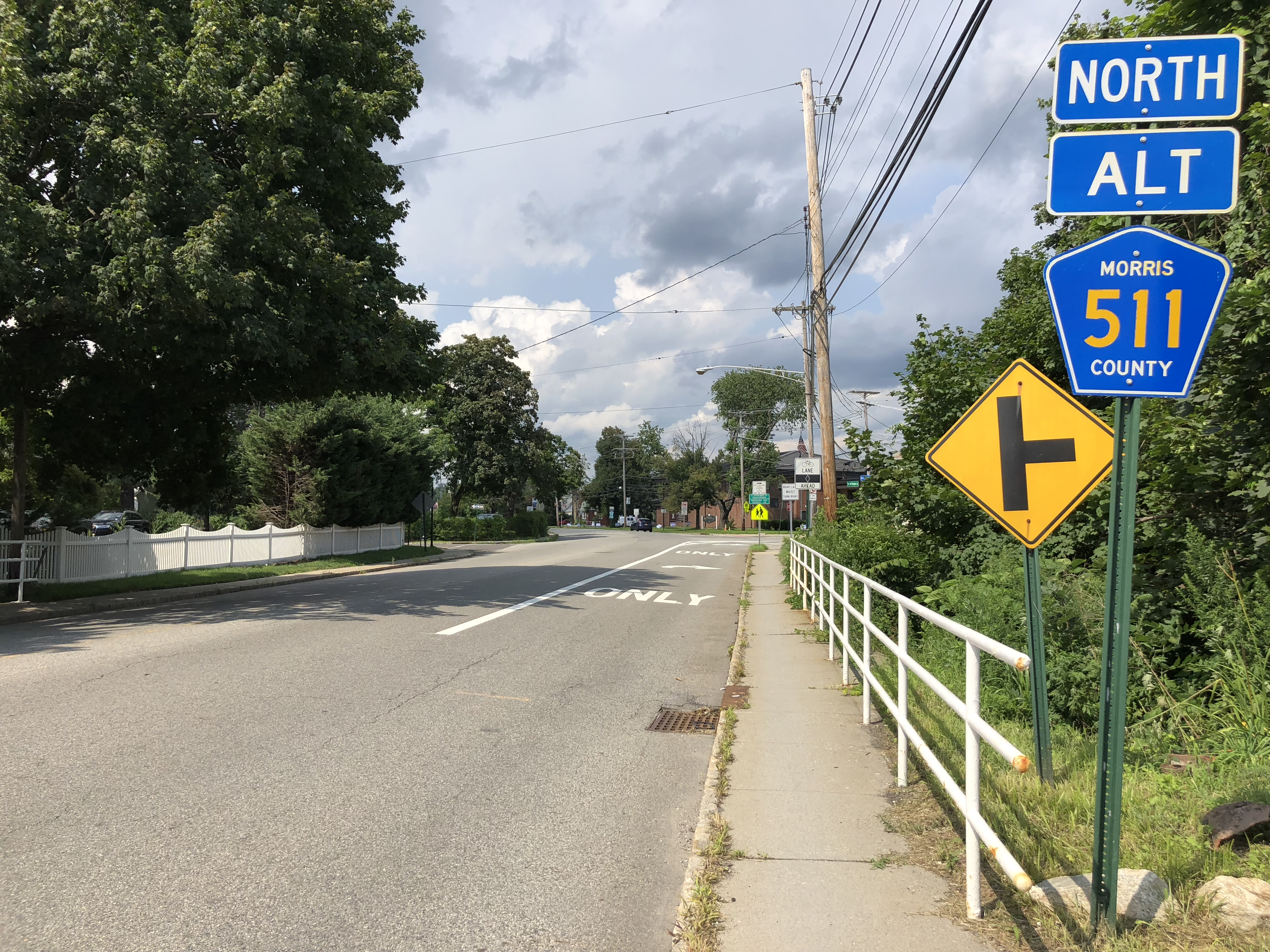
View north along CR 511 Alt just north of Route 23 in Riverdale

County Route 511 Alternate (CR 511 Alt) is an alternate route of CR 511. The highway extends 9.77 miles (15.72 kilometers) from the Boonton Turnpike (US 202) in Wayne to Union Avenue (CR 511) in Wanaque. The southern 2.58 miles (4.15 km) of this highway from the intersection of US 202 and Route 23 in Wayne to the highway's split with US 202 in Lincoln Park are an example of a wrong-way concurrency, as northbound CR 511 ALT is concurrent with southbound US 202, and vice versa.

Despite its name, County Route 511 Alternate only intersects its "parent" at its northern terminus, while its southern terminus is quite far apart from its parent.

Major intersections

| County | Location | mi | km | Destinations | Notes |
|---|---|---|---|---|---|
| Passaic | Wayne | 0.00 | 0.00 | US 202 north / Route 23 | Interchange; southern terminus; southern end of US 202 concurrency |
| Morris | Lincoln Park | 2.38 | 3.83 | US 202 south (Boonton Turnpike) | Northern end of US 202 concurrency |
| Morris | Pequannock Township | 4.69 | 7.55 | CR 504 (Jacksonville Road) | |
| Morris | Pequannock Township | 6.77 | 10.90 | Route 23 south | Southern end of Route 23 concurrency |
| Morris | Riverdale | 6.96 | 11.20 | Route 23 north – Butler, Sussex | Northern end of Route 23 concurrency |
| Passaic | Wanaque | 9.65 | 15.53 | I-287 north | Exit 55 on I-287 |
| Passaic | Wanaque | 9.77 | 15.72 | CR 511 (Union Avenue / Ringwood Avenue) | Northern terminus |
1.000 mi = 1.609 km; 1.000 km = 0.621 mi: Concurrency terminus
