= Long Pond Ironworks State Park =

- U.S. National Register of Historic Places
- U.S. Historic district
- New Jersey Register of Historic Places
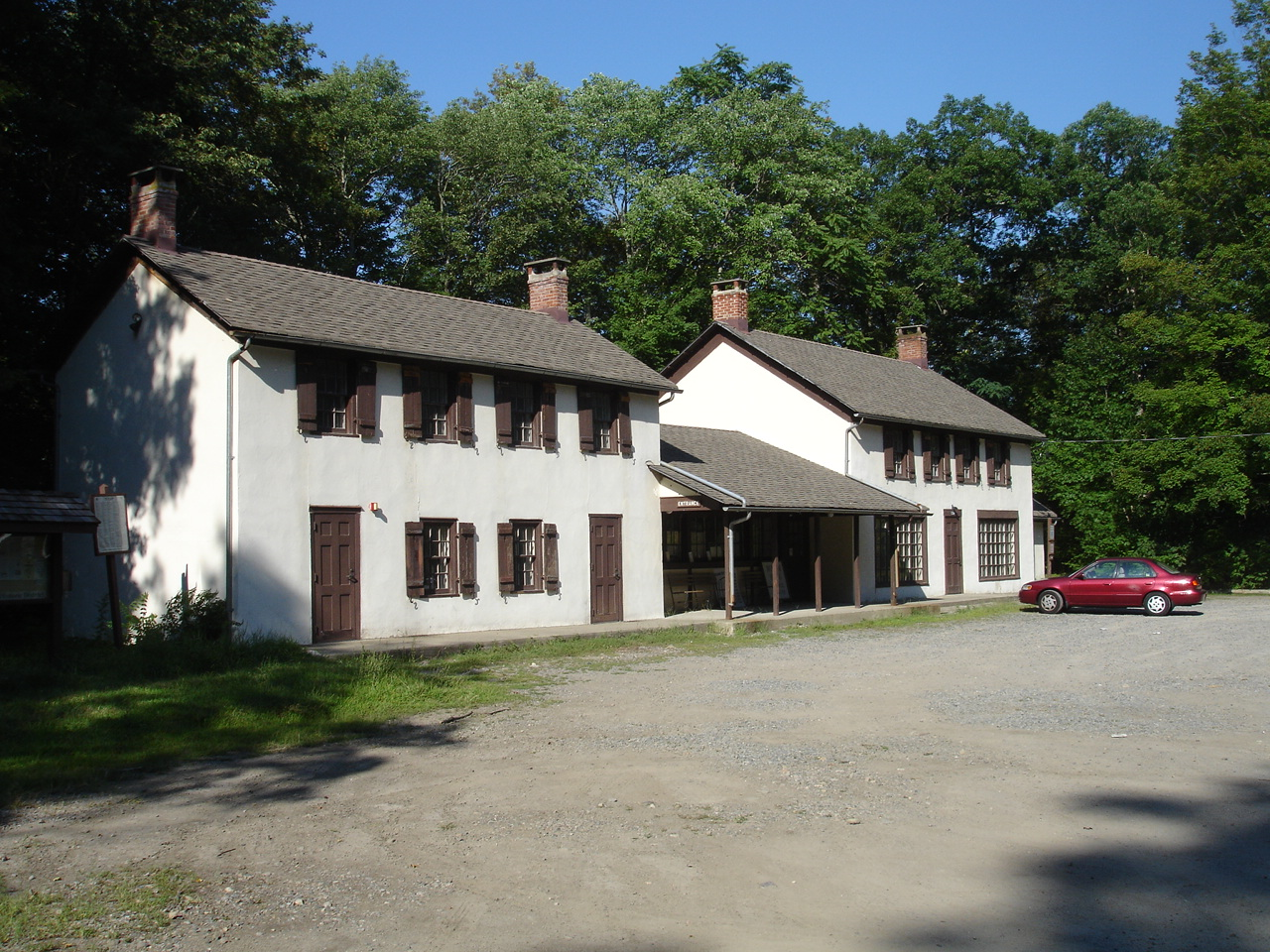
- The Old Country Store at Long Pond Iron Works

- Location within Passaic County, New Jersey Location within New Jersey Location within the United States
- Nearest city: West Milford, New Jersey
- Coordinates: 41°08′28″N 74°18′33″W
- Area: 145 acres (0.59 km^{2})
- Built: 1766
- Website: https://www.njparksandforests.org/parks/longpondironworksstatepark.html
- NRHP reference No.: 74001189
- NJRHP No.: 2422

Significant dates
- Added to NRHP: January 11, 1974
- Designated NJRHP: September 4, 1973

Long Pond Ironworks State Park is located in the community of Hewitt, in West Milford, New Jersey, United States. The park is known for its old stone walls, furnaces and other remnants of a once industrious ironworking community that now sits next to the swiftly flowing Wanaque River. The park is operated and maintained by the New Jersey Division of Parks and Forestry and has an area of 145 acres (0.59 km^{2}).

== Historic District ==
The Long Pond Ironworks were added to the National Register of Historic Places on January 11, 1974, for their significance in industry. The ironworks were founded in 1766 by Peter Hasenclever. Hasenclever brought 500 ironworkers and their families from Germany to build an ironworks "plantation". A dam at "Long Pond" (Greenwood Lake) provided the waterpower needed to operate a blast for the furnace and a large forge. The ironworks produced iron for the Continental Army, for the American forces in the War of 1812, and for the Union Army during the Civil War. Metalmaking stopped at the site in 1882 when the ironworks was bankrupted by newer facilities in Pittsburgh.

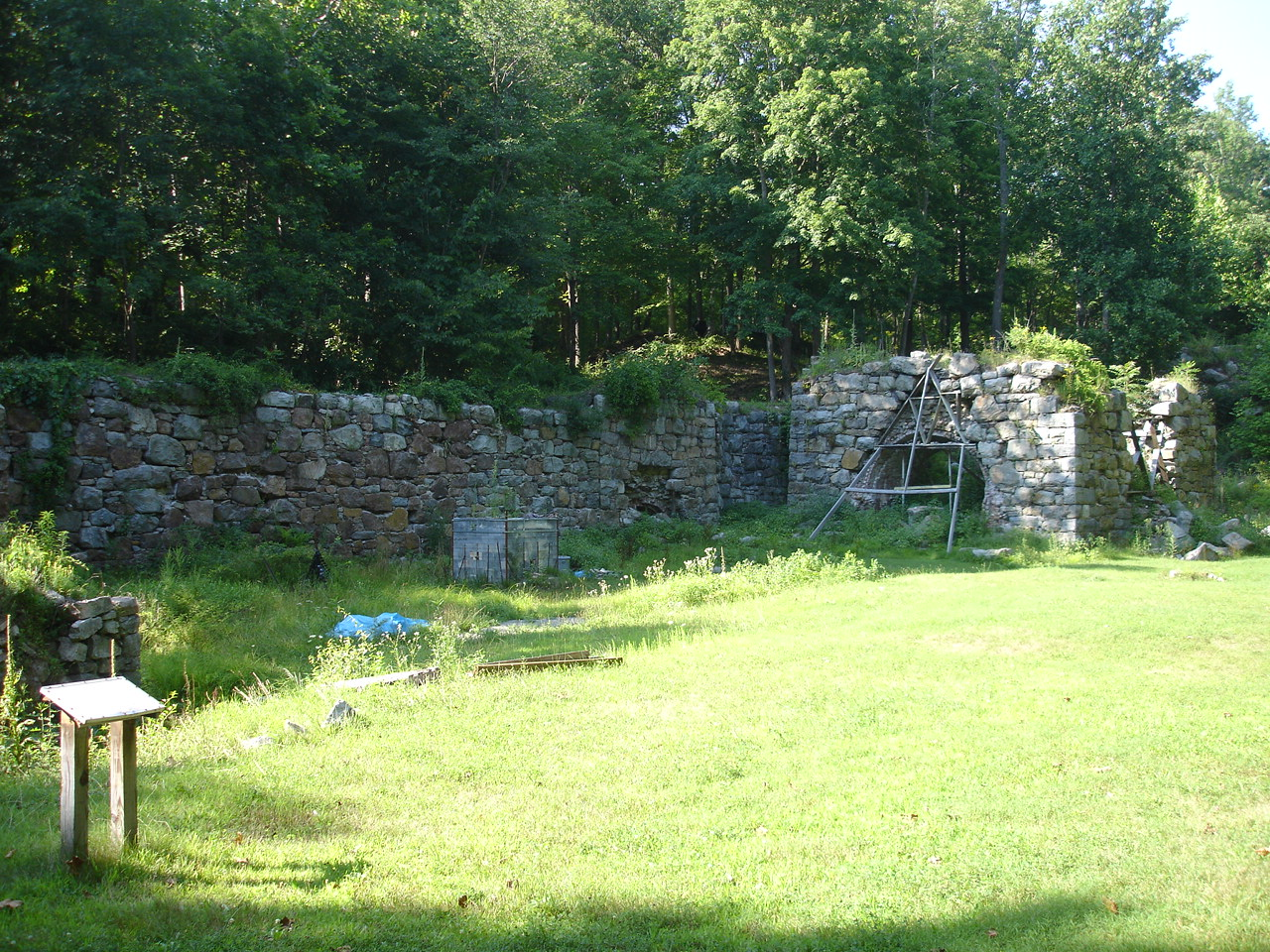
The Civil War Era Iron Furnace at Long Pond Iron Works

The remnants of the ironmaking structures at the district date from the 18th and 19th centuries. There are furnaces, casting house ruins, charging areas, ice houses, water wheels and other structures. The area is currently undergoing restoration. The "Old Country Store" has been renovated and now houses the Long Pond Ironworks Museum. The original Village of Hewitt grew up around the 19th-century iron enterprise. This settlement included a church, a store/post office, schoolhouses, and dwellings and outbuildings for workers and managers.

There are many structures within Long Pond Ironworks. There are two main water wheels in fairly good condition, despite one of the wheels being burned by vandals in 1957. There are also several furnaces of various sizes located on the property. Long Pond Ironworks Historic Site offers a tour of the historic area, where slag and charcoal produced by the ironworks are visible.

== Monksville Reservoir ==
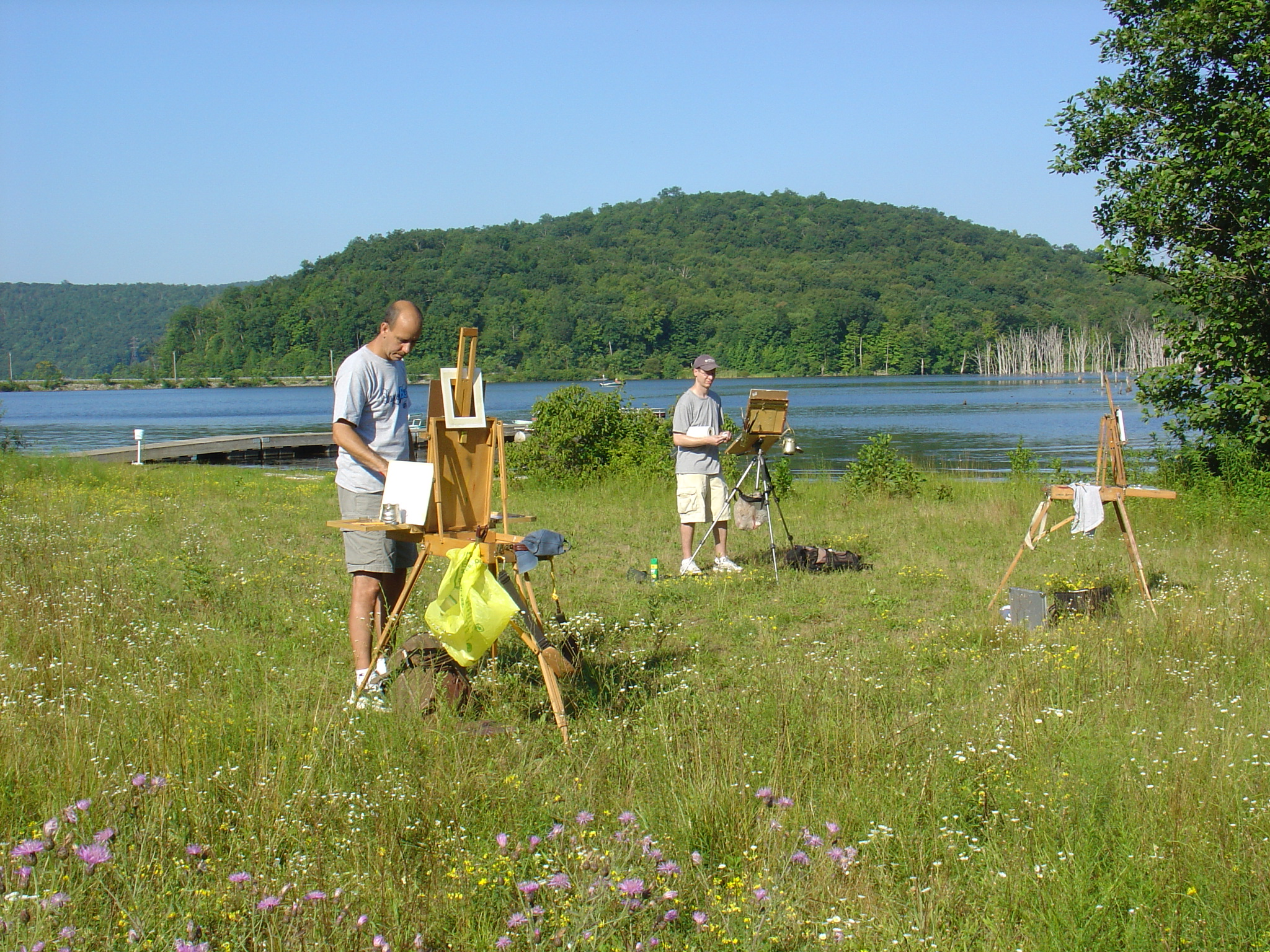
Plein air painters painting at Long Pond in Ringwood, NJ.

Known for its trophy size muskellunge, walleye, bass and trout, Monksville Reservoir, atop the defunct community of Monksville, New Jersey is used by anglers, sporting clubs and the US Sailing Association. Easily accessible from either the north or the south boat ramp, the area is open throughout the year.
