= Pompton =

Pompton may refer to the following in the U.S. state of New Jersey:

== People ==
- Pompton people, an historical Native American tribe

== Places ==
- Pompton Lakes, New Jersey, a borough in Passaic County
- Pompton Plains, New Jersey, a census-designated place in Pequannock Township
  - Pompton Plains station
- Pompton River, a tributary of the Passaic River
- Pompton Township, New Jersey, which was divided in 1918 into three boroughs: Wanaque, Ringwood and Bloomingdale

== See also ==
- Pompton Mutiny, of Continental Army troops in 1781
- Prompton (disambiguation)
