= Monksville =

Monksville may refer to:

- Monksville Reservoir, in Passaic County, New Jersey
  - Monksville, New Jersey, a defunct community flooded by the above reservoir
