= Craig Slaff =

Craig Slaff is an artist known for his depiction of themes in aviation. National museums that have displayed Slaff's works include: the National Museum of Naval Aviation in Pensacola, Florida, the Canada Aviation Museum in Ottawa, the U.S. Air Force Museum in Dayton, Ohio, and the Mighty Eighth Air Force Museum in Pooler, Georgia. The Pentagon, the Coast Guard's Art Program, and several corporations have also displayed his work.

== Early life and education ==
Raised in Lincoln Park, New Jersey, Slaff graduated from Morristown-Beard School in Morristown, New Jersey, in 1978, where he played prep basketball. He presented the Lehman Lecture on "Painting Stories" at the school in 2012. Slaff received his Bachelor of Arts degree in fine arts from Hartwick College in Oneonta, New York in 1982. In 2010, his daughter Deena received Hartwick College's Alumni Association Scholarship.

== Artist studio ==
Slaff worked as a heavy equipment operator for the International Union of Operating Engineers' Local 825 group in NJ/NY for 16 years. He participated in the construction of the Monksville Dam in Monksville, New Jersey and the building of Interstate 287. This helped fund the construction of Slaff's artist studio and home in Northern New Jersey.

== Professional recognition ==
The National Museum of Naval Aviation has awarded Slaff two Merit Awards (2003, 2007), a Director's Choice Award (2005), and an Honorable Mention (2004). The Skylands Arts and Music Festival has awarded Slaff their George Morville Sr. Memorial Award (2001) and their People's Choice Award (2004). Slaff's work has also received honorable mentions in awards competitions by Aviation Week and Space Technology (2002–2004) and the Canadian Museum of Flight (2001).

== Family ==
Craig Slaff married Carol Goodwin. They have three children.
