= Wanaque =

Wanaque may refer to:

- Wanaque, New Jersey, a borough in Passaic County, New Jersey
- Wanaque River, a tributary of the Pequannock River in Passaic County, New Jersey
  - Wanaque Reservoir, formed by damming the river
