= Coaxen Indian Village =

Coordinates: 39.9919°N 74.8537°W

Coaxen Indian Village or Weekpink was a settlement named after Coaxen, the name of a local band of Lenape located in Burlington County, New Jersey, along the South Branch of the Rancocas Creek. It is also the name of both a nearby stream and one of two villages known during the historic period, residence of this native group, the other being Weekpink (variously Weekping, Weepinck, Wepink, etc.). Weekpink is also the name of a small run of water that empties into the South Branch of the Rancocas, and is also located within the historic bounds of the Coaxen Indian settlement. This settlement, and both streams, are now located in Southampton Township, New Jersey.

== Historical references ==
The first mention of Coaxen comes from a 1691 colonial survey for 400 acres of land to Thomas Evans at the Indian Town of Quaexin on one of the branches of the Rancocas. An Indian village existed on Coaxen Run, now Little Creek, to the rear of the present-day Roberts farm. Coaxen is the accepted form for the past usages of Quaexin, Quakeson, etc. In the Lenape language, Coaxen means there are pine trees, and Weekpink refers to place of bast fibre, which is plant material used for mats and other handicrafts.

Soon after the arrival of Quaker settlers in Burlington County they formed the Proprietors of West Jersey, who, in turn, appointed commissioners to purchase lands from the indigenous Lenape. One of these commissioners was Daniel Wills, who eventually owned large tracts land in what was then Northampton Township, in the vicinity of Rancocas Creek. After his death in 1698, his son, John Wills, inherited much of his father's land, including 624 acres lying near the forks of the river at the South Branch.

John Wills was a member of the colonial council, friend to Governor Robert Hunter, and also served as an Indian Commissioner. In 1713, he was responsible for fending off an Indian war over the fraudulent attempt by John Wetherill:

MEHEMICKWON the Indian King who was Commonly by the English Called King Charles made his Complaint to me Several times That John Wetherill had a design to Cheat him of Some of his Land at a place Called Coerping [Coaxen]: I asked him wch way that could be, he Answered that he had made him Drunk and when So had made a writing and got him Set his hand to it And this is what he Affirmed at all times when we Discoursed on that Subject And further he told me that ye Said John Wetherill offered to give him more Drink next morning, the Indian Said he asked the said Wetherill for what he would give him Drink, the said Wetherill Answered do you not know for wt do you not Remember you Sold me the Land last Night, no said the Indian I knew nothing of it, for I was So Drunk last Night, that I knew nothing, not So much as where I was, And if you have done Any Such thing by me when I was in that Condition as to get my hand to A writing, you have Cheated me.

Mehemickwon was known to the English settlers as King Charles, a reference to the then reigning monarch in England, King Charles II. He was the acknowledged leader of the Lenape living in the region of the Rancocas, stretching from Assunpink to Big Timber Creek along the New Jersey shoreline of the Delaware River. When Wetherill claimed Coaxen lands from Mehemickwon, the latter threatened retaliation, and Governor Robert Hunter was rightfully worried that a rupture with the Indians was imminent. He used the power of his office to convince Wetherill to destroy the fraudulent deed, and it was burned in the presence of the Indian leader. To prevent such occurrences from happening again, John Wills took the unique step of deeding the Coaxen lands to the Indians. By 1740, Mehemickwon was dead, and a new leader, King Ossolowhen, had replaced him, but he, too, was deceased. Ossolowhen's brothers and relations were the recipient of John Will's deed:

This Indenture made the Sixth day of October 1740 year of our Lord One thousand Seven hundred and Forty and in the Year of the Reign of our Sovereign Lord George the Second over Great Britain France and Ireland King &c Between John Wills of the Township of Northampton in the County of Burlington and province of New Jersey (Gentleman) of the one part and the Children of the late Indian King Ossolowhen late of the Township of Northampton in the County and province aforesaid deceased and his Two Brothers, called by the names of Teannis and Moonis Indians and Natives of the Westerly Division of the province of New Jersey.

The deed provided a metes and bounds description of what was henceforth known as the Coaxen. The deed from Wills was transferred:

Every part and parcel thereof with their and every of their Appurtenances unto the Children of the said Ossolowhen and to his Two Brothers Teannis and Moonis and their Progeny so long as the Water run in the River Delaware and Ancocas or Northampton River To their only proper Use Behoof of the Children of the said Ossolowhen and his Two Brothers Teannis and Moonis and their Generations of[f]spring Stock or Kindred and to such of them as the said Land may descend according to the Custom used amongst the said Indians for evermore... so long as the Water runs in the River Delaware and [R]Ancocas or Northampton river.

Thus John Wills, member of the Society of Friends and New Jersey Indian Commissioner, used the form of English-style law to ensure that this land be held in perpetuity to the local Lenape community. His efforts were noted in Samuel Smith's work, The History of Nova Cesaerea [New Jersey], published in 1765. He wrote of the remaining Indian lands in New Jersey:

One of these in particular ought to be noted in this place, to the honour of John Wills, sometime one of the council, by whose advice the Indian sachem, called king Charles, laid an English right on a large plantation at Weekpink, containing a valuable tract of land, in the county of Burlington, which is so contrived as to remain unalienable from his posterity, who now enjoy the benefit of it.

In 1761, there were approximately forty native residents at Coaxen.

== Coaxen and Brotherton ==
By the 1750s, the remaining Lenape in New Jersey, also known as the Delaware Indians by this time, were experiencing ever-increasing pressure on their families and communities. Land frauds, dishonest traders, and loss of access to lands for hunting and fishing, combined with epidemics of disease and social ills (notably alcohol) led to an out-migration to western lands in Pennsylvania and the Ohio River Valley.

A religious revival took hold in some Lenape communities, notably at the Forks of the Delaware (Easton, Pennsylvania area) in the 1740s, under the missionary work of David Brainerd. By 1745, he established a Christian Indian mission at Crosswicks, New Jersey, which relocated to present-day Monroe Township, Middlesex County, New Jersey in 1746 at what was called Bethel Indian Town. David Brainerd died of tuberculosis in 1747, as did dozens of his converts, and he was replaced by his younger brother, John Brainerd. The younger Brainerd used Bethel as his base while he traveled in New Jersey, Pennsylvania and Massachusetts, bringing Christianity to Indian communities, including Coaxen, Lenape settlements on the Susquehanna River, and to the Stockbridge Mohicans and Wappingers in Massachusetts. In 1749, Brainerd noted the following in reference to Coaxen:

Aug. 30: Came to a number of Indians near Rancocas, where I had appointed my interpreter to meet me. I spent some time in private conversation with them, and afterwards called them all together, being about twenty-two in number, and preached to them. They attended on divine worship with seriousness and considerable decency.

Sept. 1: Visited the Indians again. Spent some time in private discourse with them, and then gathered them all together and preached to them. They attended on the several parts of divine worship with seriousness and decency, and one or two seemed to be affected with divine truths...I called the Indians together in one place, and, after prayer, discoursed to them, suiting my discourse to their understanding and the occasion as well as I could; and when I had done speaking to the Indians, turned to the white people, a great number of whom were present, I believe at least one hundred and fifty or two hundred of all sorts,-and gave them a solemn word of exhortation

Sept. 2: Visited the Indians, had considerable conversation with them in a more private manner; then retired a little while for prayer, and afterwards called the Indians all together and carried on public worship...These Indians (being near twenty in number) seem to be generally convinced of the truth of the Christian religion, and one or two seem to be concerned for their souls, and desire to go where they can have opportunity to hear the gospel. I encouraged their going to Bethel, the Christian Indian town, which I suspect a number will do; but others seem inclined to go over towards Susquehanna. May the Lord follow them, wherever they go, with his blessing, and make them savingly acquainted with his dear Son!

Lord's day, Sept. 3: Went to the Indians about nine in the morning; attended divine worship with them, there being now about thirty persons more able to attend on religious worship.

Sept. 4: Went to the Indians; spent some time in conversation, and then called them together and attended public worship; prayed, preached, &c., and after I had done, gave them a more particular account of the state of affairs among the Indians at Bethel, where I live, and advised them to come there. Just as I was about to take leave of them, there came a little boy of about ten or eleven years old, and hung about me and began to cry, upon which I inquired what he wanted. I soon understood that he wanted to go with me; so I asked his parents if they were willing. They said, "yes." So I sent him along with an Indian who belonged to the place where I live. Another showed a very great desire to go, and cried heartily enough because he could not go then; and when I took my leave of them the most of them seemed to be sorrowful. May the Lord bless what has been spoken to them, and grant that the good impressions made on their minds may never wear off till they are brought to a saving acquaintance with himself!

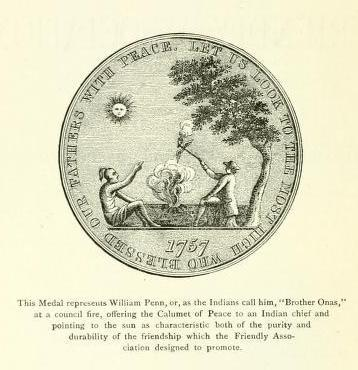
Medal issued by the Friendly Association for Regaining and Preserving Peace with the Indians by Pacific Measures in 1757

With the outbreak of the French and Indian War in 1755, the British colonies, including New Jersey, witnessed a violent wave of Indian attacks along the frontier. After Braddock's defeat in 1755, the Delaware Indian communities of the Susquehanna and Ohio river valleys openly allied with the French. In an effort to regain allegiance or at least neutrality of the Delaware, and their Algonquian relatives such as the Shawnee, British authorities directed that any outstanding Indian complaints be addressed. Two groups were formed by Quakers: "Friendly Association for Regaining and Preserving Peace with the Indians by Pacific Measures" was established in 1756, and the New Jersey Association for Helping the Indians was established in 1757. These, and William Johnson, Indian Agent for the Crown, worked towards settling Indian disputes, including confused land titles in New Jersey.

Ownership of Coaxen, aka Weekpink, demonstrated both native traditions and practices of communal propriety of lands; individual small lot ownership had not yet been a legal practice assimilated by this Delaware Indians. From the time of the first negotiations with New Jersey colonial authorities in January, 1756 at the First Treaty of Crosswicks, the Delaware Indians of New Jersey and Pennsylvania held the Coaxen tract as part of their tribal lands:

We have to complain to our Brethren, that ill minded Persons are apt to take Advantage of the Indians when they are Drunk, and buy their Lands for a trifle, and often from the Indians who does not own it. And we pray our Brethren, that for the future no Indian Deed or Lease may be allowed to be good, but what is made and Signed before the Governor, or two of his Council, who are to have a Certificate from six Indians, that the Indian who sells the Land, is Owner of it, under the Hand of some Magistrate, who sees the six Indians Sign it, and the Deed to have it wrote on the back, and signed by the Governor, or two of his Council, that they saw the Certificate of the six Indians, Signed by the Justice, and that the Indian who sells the Land, understood the Deed, and had a reasonable Price as common for it. As some bad People have got a long Lease from a Drunken Indian for the Indian Lands at Wepink, and for which they pay mostly, or all in strong Drink, we beg that they may be removed from that Land, and we hope care will be taken that no loose People to settle on our Lands, without buying them.

To which the Indian Commissioners replied:

As to your Lands at Wepink, we shall make a Report about it, and you may depend upon amble Justice being done to you.

The Indian communities represented at this first conference at Crosswicks included Cranbury [Bethel Indian Town], Crosswicks, Pompton [Munsees] and the Southern Indians, which counted a Mullis among its number.

Out of these efforts came the establishment of New Jersey's only Indian reservation, Brotherton, in present-day Shamong Township, Burlington County, New Jersey. Located only twelve miles from Coaxen, this reservation was an attempt to both satisfy Indian land claims and to transform the native people into yeoman farmers. The site of Brotherton had been claimed by Jacob Mullis (Moonis in the 1740 deed) in 1758 in a list of disputed lands claimed by native owners. In Jacob Mullis' will, recorded in 1783, he was identified as a resident of Quoickson, and he bequeathed the plantation to his wife and children.

The proximity of Brotherton and its association with the Moonis/Mullis family demonstrated that both parcels of land were considered as joint possession by the local Delaware Indian community, which was administered by an Indian Board of Proprietors including Jacob Mullis and his son, Charles. In letters written in 1777, the local community signs itself as the Indians of Brotherton and Weekping.

The issue of communal control over both Brotherton and Coaxen, aka Weekpink, was put to severe test in 1797, when the sole remaining New Jersey Indian Commissioner, Josiah Foster (son of William Foster, appointed Indian Commissioner in 1757, gained control of the Coaxen land through the will of Charles Mullis, son of Jacob Mullis. Charles Mullis was a named recipient of this parcel through the will of his father, Jacob, dated 1783.

== Contested ownership ==
In September 1797, Charles Mullis was suffering an illness which took his life on February 10, 1798. On September 9, 1797, Josiah Foster called several neighbors to witness the will of Mullis. As the ill man lay in bed, Foster sat with the man and directed the witnesses to leave the residence. Shortly thereafter, the witnesses came back in and an unidentified person took Mullis' hand and made the sign of an X on the paper. Thus was the Coaxen parcel, formerly deeded to the offspring and relatives of Osollowhen forever, seemingly transferred to Foster.

Mary Calvin and Bartholomew Calvin were members of the Brotherton ruling council, and Bathsheba Mullis was the wife of Charles Mullis.

For the next twenty-one years, a legal battle over ownership of Coaxen was waged in county, state and federal court. Beginning in 1806, the State of New Jersey enacted a law to establish guardianship of the property for the Coaxen Indians, to oversee the property and to ensure that any profits arising from land leases for farming and timber be paid to them.

Chapter CXVIII. An Act appointing commissioners to take in charge the Coaxen lands in the county of Burlington.

WHEREAS the Coaxen Indians by their petition to the legislature have represented they claim right to a tract of land in said county, of which they and their ancestors have been in possession of upwards of sixty years, and at this time from a variety of causes are entirely incapable of managing the same to the best advantage; they therefore request the legislature to pass a law appointing commissioners to take charge of and improve the same; which appearing reasonable that the prayer of the petitioners ought to be granted,

Passed at Trenton March 13, 1806.

The action of Foster to acquire Coaxen for himself also set off a chain of events which included the decision on the part of many remaining Delaware Indians in New Jersey to leave the state. As early as the 1760s, Delaware Indians living in the Ohio Valley urged their relations in New Jersey to move west to join the main body. In 1775, New Jersey Delaware Indian leader Isaac Stille, personally led approximately sixty New Jersey Indians to the Ohio Valley. Yet many Delawares living at Brotherton and Weekping remained, even when John Brainerd left their mission by the time of the American Revolution. It was in 1802, after Foster's taking of the Coaxen tract, that many of the remaining Delawares in New Jersey signed a petition for the dissolution of Brotherton, opening the way for about eighty of them to move to New Stockbridge, New York. In 1817, these Delaware, now resident in New York, petitioned the New Jersey legislature:

Than your petitioners, impressed with a deep sense of past favors received from your Honorable Body, having always looked up to the Governor & Legislature of the State of New Jersey while resident therein, as our fathers protectors & friends, would now (although in a different State) look up to you as such, & for important reason pray, that your Honorable Body would be pleased to pass a law, authorizing Messrs. Charles Ellis, William Stockton, & Joseph Budd Esqrs. to sell our right & title to the only remaining piece of land we have in New Jersey State, formerly the life estate of Charles Moolis an Indian deceased, & usually known there by the name of the Coaxen plantation. - For as it now is, we receive no profit from said land, & in consequence of Josiah Foster's claim it may so remain, although we are fully sensible that in the line of strict justice, he has no right to any part of said lands.

A legislative committee reviewing the petition found that:

With respect to the interest which the petitioners are entitled to in the property, were there no adverse claims, there has been laid before the committee no satisfactory evidence. There are numerous Indians in this state claiming a participation in the property. Their claims can only be correctly determined by such rules of evidence, as the judicial tribunal which may have cognizance of the same has established in such cases.

By 1805, the organized body of New Jersey Delaware Indians had relocated out of state, with only a handful of families remaining to attend to the Coaxen lands. Among the claimants to this land was the son of Chief White Eyes of the Delaware, residing in the Ohio Valley. The wife of Jacob Mullis was the sister of White Eyes, and her son sought to claim the land, unsuccessfully. The Ohio Valley was too far distant for such a claim to be enforced, and occurred at a time when frontier violence in that area effectively prevented any meaningful chance for legal redress.

By 1818, Josiah Foster instituted suit in federal district court to evict the tenant on the tract who was under contract with the Coaxen Commissioners. The federal court ruled on two questions: First, did the law recognize a will as a valid instrument if one of the parties was an Indian (the NJ Prerogative Court had affirmatively ruled on this issue in 1802 but was not enforced); and 2) if the answer to the first question is yes, does the plaintiff (Foster) have a right to eject the lessee then resident on the land. In October, 1819, the federal court found in favor of the first question, and Josiah Foster was awarded possession of Coaxen. The court did not consider the circumstances of the will, which had been found by the Burlington County Surrogate Court to be spurious.

Foster's motive for manipulating Charles Mullis, and arguing against any Indian claims was expressed in a letter dated August 8, 1811 when he wrote:

I never intend giving up my Right to the Land in Question which I think I shall have full Paid for having under the Law of New Jersey acted as Commitioner (after the death of my father) to the Indians at Edgpillock and Coaxen for Near thirty years without fee or Reward.

== Religious association ==
1749 was the first written record of Missionary John Brainerd visiting Coaxen. His surviving journals from 1761 and 1762 contain many references to his work at the site, located approximately twelve miles from Brotherton, where he served as both minister and Indian Guardian, the latter post an appointment by the Governor Hardy of New Jersey in 1762.

In 1762, he worked with the Coaxen Indians and local white residents to construct a meeting house at Coaxen, and in 1775, he made passing reference to a need for more building materials to finish the project. In 1788, while on a fund-raising tour for the Indian community at Brothertown, New York, Mohegan cleric Samsom Occom visited both Coaxen and Brotherton, and preached at both places, including the Coaxen Meeting House.

In 1794, a road was laid out leading from nearby Vincentown to the Coaxen Meeting House, which is today's Church Road and Village Lane in Southampton Township, Burlington County.

The meeting house was disassembled in the early 1800s and subsequently used as a church in Vincentown until the 1830s, and then moved to Red Lion for use as a school, then a barn, and finally demolished in about 1916.

== Present day ==
An 1818 resurvey of the Coaxen Place, as the lands deeded in 1740 were known, amounted to two-hundred and fifty-nine acres. This parcel was eventually purchased by General William Irick and remained in the Irick family until the 1939. Portions were sold off, however the core farm remained. In 2015 it is known as the Dolan Farm, named for its present owners. Michael Dolan is a professional builder and land developer and the site is now proposed as the location of a housing subdivision.

Local advocates, including botanists, paleontologists, historians and environmentalists have brought forth documentation regarding unique resources present at the site. These include the Vicentown Formation, a geologic formation in New Jersey. It preserves fossils dating back to the Paleogene period; unique flora, including Dwarf Ginseng (Panax trifolium), American Bladdernut (Staphylea trifolia), the endangered Redbud (Cercis canadensis), and Hemlock (Tsuga canadensis). These plants have a role in traditional native usage.

The Dolan Farm contains prime agricultural farmland and the South Branch of the Rancocas falls within the riparian rights of the State of New Jersey. A Lenape burial ground is located on the property, near the site of the former William Irick mansion.

Not all the Lenape Delaware left New Jersey, and some from the out-migration to New Stockbridge returned. As George Fleming, author of the seminal book on the Brotherton Reservation wrote, "there may yet come to light further information about the possible descendants of the natives who may have intermarried with the early settlers or were otherwise assimilated into the White man's world." The state-recognized Nanticoke Lenni-Lenape Tribal Nation of Bridgeton, New Jersey, and other individuals of Native ancestry remain in the area and hold Coaxen as a sacred place.

As of March 2015, a nomination to the National Register of Historic Places is being prepared.
