= Pompton people =

Pompton
Total population
- extinct as a tribe

Regions with significant populations
- United States (New Jersey)

Languages
- English, historically Unami

Religion
- Christianity, Native American Church, traditional tribal religion

Related ethnic groups
- other Lenape

The Pompton or Pamapon people were a sub-tribe of Algonquian-speaking Native Americans, who once lived northern New Jersey. The Pompton historically lived along Pompton and Pequannock Rivers, near what is now Paterson, New Jersey, but they were forced out of New Jersey after their lands had been taken without compensation by European colonists.

== History ==
The Pompton were native to the west bank of the Hudson above New York City in both New Jersey and New York. After the decimating Esopus War of 1664 they were invited by the Munsee to join the Wappingers. Bands of the Wappinger people inhabited the east side of the Hudson River, spanning from the Bronx to southernmost Columbia County, New York.

Memerescum, a Pompton sachem, was the "sole sachem of all the nations (towns or families) of Indians on Remopuck River, and on the east and west branches thereof, on Saddle River, Pasqueck River, Narranshunk River and Tappan, gave title to all the lands in upper or northwestern Bergen and Passaic counties.", indicating a combination of clans. His name appears on the Indian Deed of 1710 (otherwise known as the Ramapo Tract or the Schuyler Patent). Chief Katonah, who was the sachem of the condensed tribe called Ramapo in Connecticut, which originated from a tribe of Pompton and was forced to move to Connecticut by the encroachment of the Dutch. Tapgow, who was Katonah's uncle signed on the Indian Deed of 1710, the Wawayanda Patent and others.

== Etymology ==
Pompton is thought to mean "a place where they catch soft fish." Pequannock (in the name of the Township and of the Pequannock River) is thought to have been derived from the Lenape word "Paquettahhnuake", meaning, "cleared land ready or being readied for cultivation".

== See also ==
- Arent Schuyler
- List of Bergen, New Netherland placename etymologies
- Hackensack tribe
- Great Trail
- Lenape Trail
- Minisink Archeological Site
