= Monksville Reservoir =

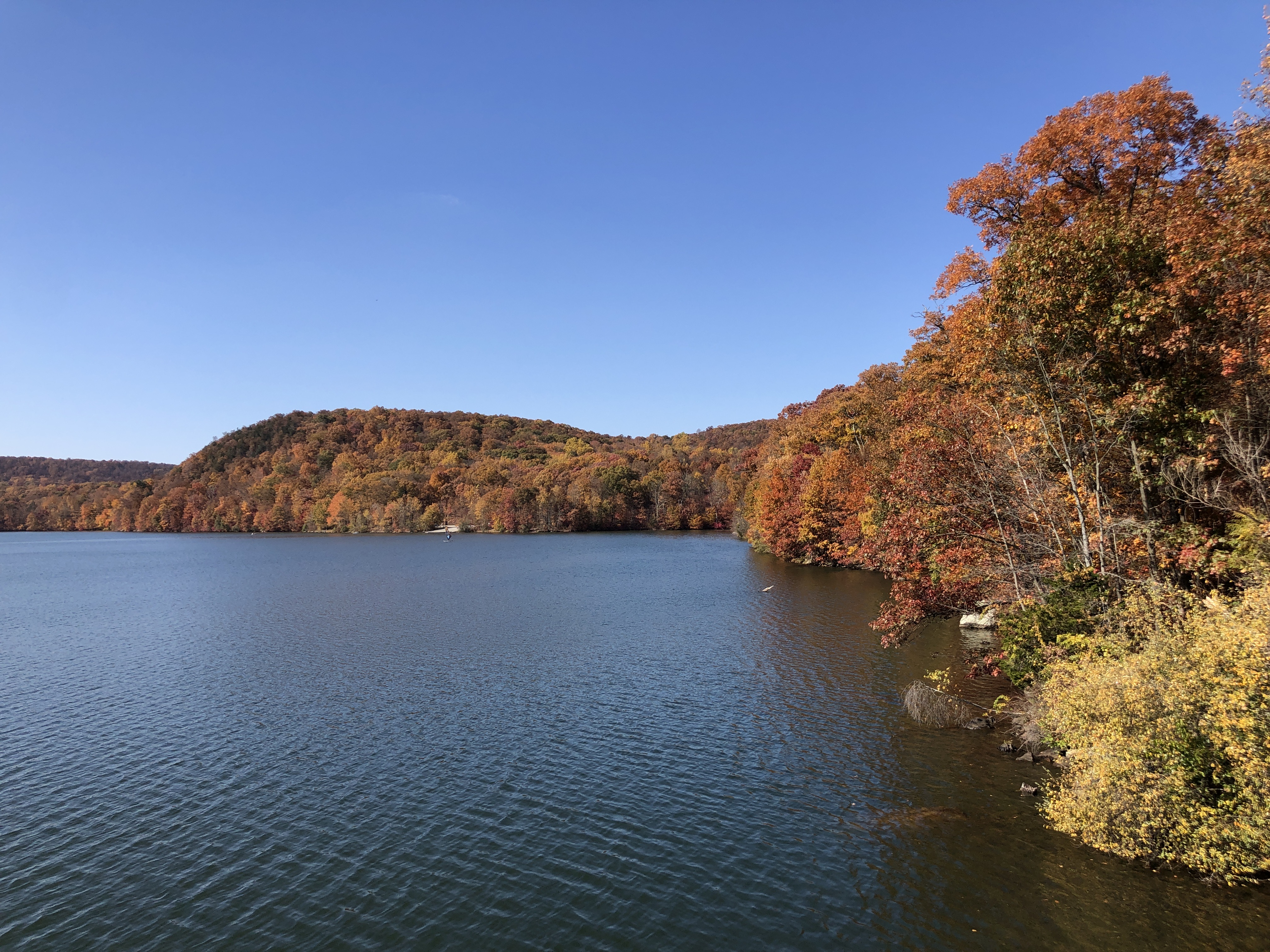
- View from the Monksville Dam northwestward along the northeast shore of Monksville Reservoir

- Location within Passaic County, New Jersey Location within New Jersey Location within the United States
- Interactive map of Monksville Reservoir
- Location: Ringwood and West Milford, New Jersey, Passaic County
- Coordinates: 41.122217°N 74.299829°W
- Type: Reservoir
- Etymology: Monksville, New Jersey
- Part of: Long Pond Ironworks State Park
- Primary inflows: Wanaque River
- Primary outflows: Wanaque Reservoir
- Basin countries: United States
- Managing agency: Hackensack Water Company; North Jersey District Water Supply Commission; New Jersey Division of Parks and Forestry
- Built: 1985
- First flooded: 1989
- Max. length: 3 mi (4.8 km)
- Surface area: 505 acres (2.04 km^{2})
- Max. depth: 90 ft (27 m)
- Water volume: 7 billion US gallons (26,000,000 m^{3})
- Surface elevation: 400 ft (120 m)
- Settlements: Hewitt, New Jersey

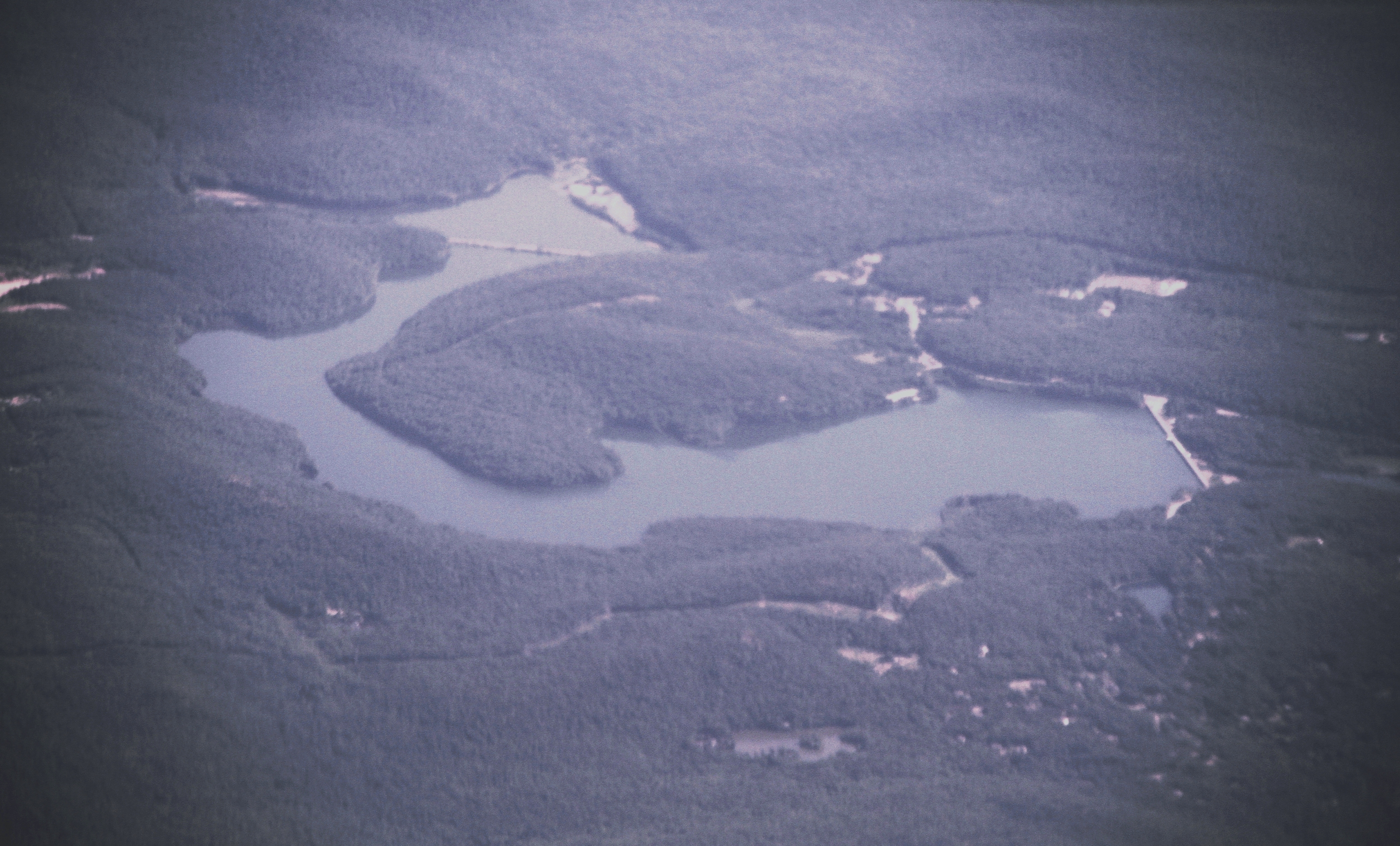
Monksville Reservoir, New Jersey, seen from the south.

The Monksville Reservoir is an artificial lake created in 1987 by damming on the Wanaque River in Ringwood, New Jersey. It is named after the former community of Monksville, which was relocated and flooded upon its completion.

== History ==
The reservoir was built to relieve chronic water shortages in northern New Jersey that occurred in the 1980s due to drought conditions. The reservoir extended the capacity of the nearby 29-billion-US-gallon (110,000,000 m^{3}) Wanaque Reservoir. It is owned jointly by Suez North America and the North Jersey District Water Supply Commission.

== Location ==
The lake is in Long Pond Ironworks State Park, which is located in the community of Hewitt, in West Milford, New Jersey, United States. The park is known for its old stone walls, furnaces and other remnants of a once industrious ironworking community that now sits next to the swiftly flowing Wanaque River. The park is operated and maintained by the New Jersey Division of Parks and Forestry. The state of New Jersey previously spent $2.7 million purchasing land at the site to be part of the state park before drought changed the priority to the reservoir.

Approximately 15 residences, mostly owned by the Rhinesmith and Vreeland families, were purchased with NJ Green Acres funding and their owners relocated. Two homes of historic significance were moved, the others were demolished.

== Construction ==
Construction of the reservoir was started in 1985. Land was cleared and gravel was crushed on site and stock-piled. Stonetown Road was realigned to run over the dam. A small bailey bridge that was put in place in 1977 was dismantled to be used again elsewhere. The Monksville dam is approximately 0.4 miles (0.64 km) long. A portion of Greenwood Lake Turnpike was realigned to higher ground.

The dam impounds water from the Wanaque River flowing down from Greenwood Lake. A spillway was constructed to allow water to flow into the Wanaque Reservoir below. During times of low flow, water from the Monksville Reservoir is released into the Wanaque Reservoir below via the intake tower which mixes water from various levels of the Monksville.

The dam was constructed with rollcrete. Dirt and gravel from on-site were mixed with cement. A dry mix of this material was laid down by large spreader trucks. A water truck would sprinkle the mix every 30 minutes around the clock to cure the mix. The face of the dam on the water side was faced with concrete, the other side was earthen. In 2007 the earthen side was refaced with concrete.

Building of the actual dam started in March 1987 and was completed in August 1987. Then-governor Thomas Kean was present for the ribbon-cutting ceremony in autumn 1987.

The reservoir filled quickly and was full by October 1987.

== Activities ==
The lake is used by anglers, sporting clubs, the Society for the Education of American Sailors (SEAS), and is the home of Highlands Rowing Center, North Jersey Rowing, and Advanced Community Rowing Association. The reservoir is the home practice facility of the Suffern High School Varsity & Novice Crew teams. The Monksville Reservoir is known for its trophy size muskellunge, walleye, bass and trout.
