= John Jay High School (Cross River, New York) =

Location
- 60 North Salem Road; Cross River, New York 10518; United States; 41.2733°N 73.6107°W

Information
- Type: Public high school
- Established: 1956
- School district: Katonah-Lewisboro School District
- Principal: Steven T. Siciliano
- Staff: 82.83 (FTE)
- Grades: 9–12
- Enrollment: 888 (2023–2024)
- Student to teacher ratio: 10.72
- Colors: Purple; White
- Mascot: Wolves
- Website: jjhs.klschools.org

John Jay High School is a public high school located in Lewisboro, New York. It is the only high school in the Katonah-Lewisboro School District. The school, which opened in 1956, is named after John Jay, a Founding Father of the United States, and first Chief Justice of the Supreme Court, who lived nearby. Over the years, the school former mascot, the Indians, had been controversial, and it was decided in November 2019 to retire the mascot in favor of a new one. In 2020, the school announced that their new mascot would be the Wolves, a nod to the nearby Wolf Conservation Center.

== History ==
John Jay High School opened in 1956, having moved from its location in Katonah, which is now Katonah Elementary School, still part of the Katonah-Lewisboro School District. Prior to the settler colonialism of the late 17th century, this land belonged to Chief Katonah, sachem of the Ramapo Indians and the primary proprietor of the lands around Bedford, including the lands upon which the school was constructed. Katonah sold this land as part of a sale of 20,000 acres of Ramapo lands for 100 Pounds Sterling to the "Proprietors of Ridgefield".

=== Vagina Monologues censorship controversy ===
In March 2007, three students faced punishment after reading a poem from the play The Vagina Monologues at an open mic night, an event open to the community. The extract included the word "vagina", and the girls had been asked to edit the word out because the crowd was expected to include young children. They said they would follow this order but then disobeyed (they underlined the word by saying it in unison). The school gave them a one-day suspension for insubordination. The girls decided not to appeal their suspension. They agreed they had been insubordinate, but the incident was widely reported and the original order criticized as an act of censorship. Many students protested the punishment to no avail. However, many students also protested the media's portrayal of the situation, believing that the school had acted correctly and that the girls deserved to be punished for their insubordination, for they had previously agreed not to say the word. The play's author Eve Ensler gave the students her support and was invited by parents for a school visit. The suspension was put on hold while policies were reviewed and eventually rescinded.

=== Mascot controversy ===
John Jay High School formerly used the nickname Indians, with Chief Katonah as its mascot since its founding. In October 1989, after six months of discussion, the John Jay Campus Congress, a coalition of students, parents, and faculty, voted to abandon the Chief Katonah mascot, claiming that the imagery, which included feathers, tomahawks, headdresses, and loin-cloth clad natives spearing buffalo, perpetuated negative stereotypes about Native Americans and created false associations of violence and savagery that were then applied as generalizations onto indigenous people as a group. The decision was ultimately rejected, as the community was particularly swayed by a Cherokee faculty member who argued that the mascot was a means to honor the chief. The school principal at the time, John A. Chambers, also argued for the importance of maintaining tradition and school spirit, and the Indians remained intact.

In December 2017, John Jay High School students conducted a poll to gauge opinions on the mascot's potential removal. Prior to the poll, numerous student and news publications posted articles surrounding the debate, either outlining an overview of the debate in general or articulating arguments against the maintenance of the current mascot on the grounds of cultural appropriation. These students cited cultural appropriation as harmful, claiming those who support the mascot trivialize historical oppression by claiming it “honors” Native Americans. Not only that, but arguments have been made that the presence of this mascot, as seen through the lens of cultural appropriation, enables privileged individuals to commercialize the stereotypical imagery, as seen through the numerous sweatshirts, caps, and athletic gear emblazoned with images of arrowheads or headdresses, but simultaneously remain prejudiced against those same individuals off whom they are profiting. Finally, student activists have cited that the use of an “Indian” as a mascot mirrors a larger-scale issue at hand: the district's lack of consciousness related to Native American history. Ultimately, despite these arguments, the results of the poll showed that 58% of students were in favor of keeping the mascot.

On October 17, 2019, the Board of Education agreed that the mascot was dated and not politically correct, and requested the superintendent, Andrew Selesnick, make a change on the grounds of adherence to fundamental school principles of inclusion. In response, Selesnick suggested that the mascot was no longer appropriate and that additional discussion regarding the topic should be encouraged, citing the need for the school to uphold its adherence to the Dignity for All Students Act. He also emphasized the ability to maintain school spirit and tradition without causing offense. This led to a public conversation about the topic. Discussion continued at another school board meeting on November 7, 2019, at which it was decided the mascot would be dropped. The district established a committee of parents, students, and district personnel that narrowed community-submitted names down to two finalists, the Wolfpack and the Ravens, pending a vote of students and personnel on June 22, 2020. Although Wolfpack was the initial winner, concerns were raised due to the use of the term in connection with the Central Park Five case in 1989. In July 2020, the committee decided that Wolves was the best choice, citing the strong connection that wolves have to the community: the Wolf Conservation Center, founded in 1999, is located within the school district in South Salem.

== Athletics ==
=== Cross Country ===
John Jay has a Cross Country team. In 2013 the girls' section of the team were the State of New York Cross Country Federation Champions. These athletes gathered the school's first ever federation athletic title.

In 2017, the boys team won several invitationals, including the Warwick Wave Invitational, the Wilton Invitational, the Section 1 League 2B Championships, and the Westchester County Championships. John Jay sent their first ever boys team to the New York Federation Championships that year.

=== Ice Hockey ===
John Jay High School's ice hockey team is a Division II program competing within Section 1 of the NYSPHAA. Since their inaugural season in 1999, John Jay has won the Section 1 championship 3 times (2013, 2018, 2019,2021) and have made 1 state finals appearance in 2013. The team hosts home games off campus at the Brewster Ice Arena located in Putnam County, New York. The program is funded through both the school district and the non-profit organization, Friends of John Jay Ice Hockey.

=== Ultimate Frisbee ===
John Jay High School's Ultimate Frisbee team, Air Raid, was reformed in 2007 by students who, in that same year, coached themselves to a second-place finish losing 15-10 against Beacon High School in the inaugural New York State Championships tournament. Since that time, they have earned multiple state titles starting with a return in 2008 to defeat the reigning champions Beacon High School. Air Raid would become repeat champs in the 2011 and 2012 seasons, placing 3rd and 5th at regionals, respectively. During the 2012-13 school year, they began to include women on both Air Raid and the Bear Raid, the B-Team for the program.

== Student life ==
=== Science Research ===
Beginning in sophomore year, students in John Jay High School can choose to enroll in the science research program, which guides the student in conducting meaningful scientific research. The program is coordinated by AnnMarie Lipinsky, who, along with other science faculty, advises each student and guides each student through the challenges of conducting research for their first time. Planet 25511 Annlipinsky was named in honor for mentoring a finalist in the 2009 Intel Science Talent Search. Students are tasked with finding a mentor in a field of their choice and collaborate with their mentor to conduct a research project. Students have participated and shared their projects with success in the Regeneron Science Talent Search, the county and national Intel Science and Engineering Fair, and the Junior Sciences and Humanities Symposium. Alumni from the research program have gone on to successful careers in research, medicine, and engineering.

=== School dances ===
By 2010, due to declining attendance of school dances, the school reduced the number of dances, now only holding prom.

=== Vocal Jazz ===
John Jay High School's Vocal Jazz ensemble, directed by Steven Morse, has competed at Berklee College of Music's High School Jazz Festival every year but one since 2003. The group, ranging from 15 to 35 students and accompanied by a rhythm section, placed 2nd in the nation in the 2013 competition by only one point out of all Division 1 schools. In the 2012 competition, three of John Jay's students were recognized for Outstanding Musicianship. The group finished in 3rd place at that competition. In the 2019 competition, the ensemble placed 1st, winning by 11 points.

=== Model United Nations ===
The John Jay Model United Nations Club, has been gaining popularity in recent years. In 2014, the club hosted their first conference, called JJMUNC, that had over 200 delegates. For the Model United Nations Club, the President also serves as the Head Delegate and Secretary-General. The Secretary-General of JJMUNC I was Jeffrey Steckler, and Secretary-General for JJMUNC II in 2015 and JJMUNC III in 2016 was Daniel Gordon. The Model UN Team competes at several conferences per year.

=== Junior Statesmen of America ===
In 2005, a chapter of the Junior Statesmen of America (JSA) was founded at John Jay High School.

=== Theater ===
John Jay High School's theater program typically produces two major performances per school year: a drama in the fall, and a musical in the spring. In the 2013–2014 school year, JJHS put on Tom Stoppard's The Real Inspector Hound and Eugene Ionesco's The Bald Soprano in the Fall and Jonathan Larson's Rent in the Spring.

=== Wind Ensemble ===
The Wind Ensemble traveled to Williamsburg, VA, to compete at Heritage Festivals on April 23–26, 2009, where it won a total of four awards.

== Notable alumni ==
- Mike Bocklet, professional lacrosse player
- Carter Brey, cellist
- Romain Cannone, French fencer, 2020 Olympic gold medalist
- Alexander Chaplin, actor
- Matthew Del Negro, actor
- Noah Galvin, actor
- Matt Glaser, jazz and bluegrass musician
- Kyle Gordon, comedian, actor and musician
- Andy Milonakis, actor
- Robert Reich, Clinton Administration Secretary of Labor
- Mike Sabath, record producer, songwriter, and musician
- Campbell Scott, actor and director
- Stephen Silas. professional basketball coach
- Joan Slonczewski, biologist and science fiction author
- Roger Stone, political consultant and lobbyist
- Joe Torres, television news anchor and reporter
- Stanley Tucci, actor and director
- Mike Williams, NFL wide receiver
