= Hill and Dale Preserve =

Nature preserve in Lebanon, New Jersey

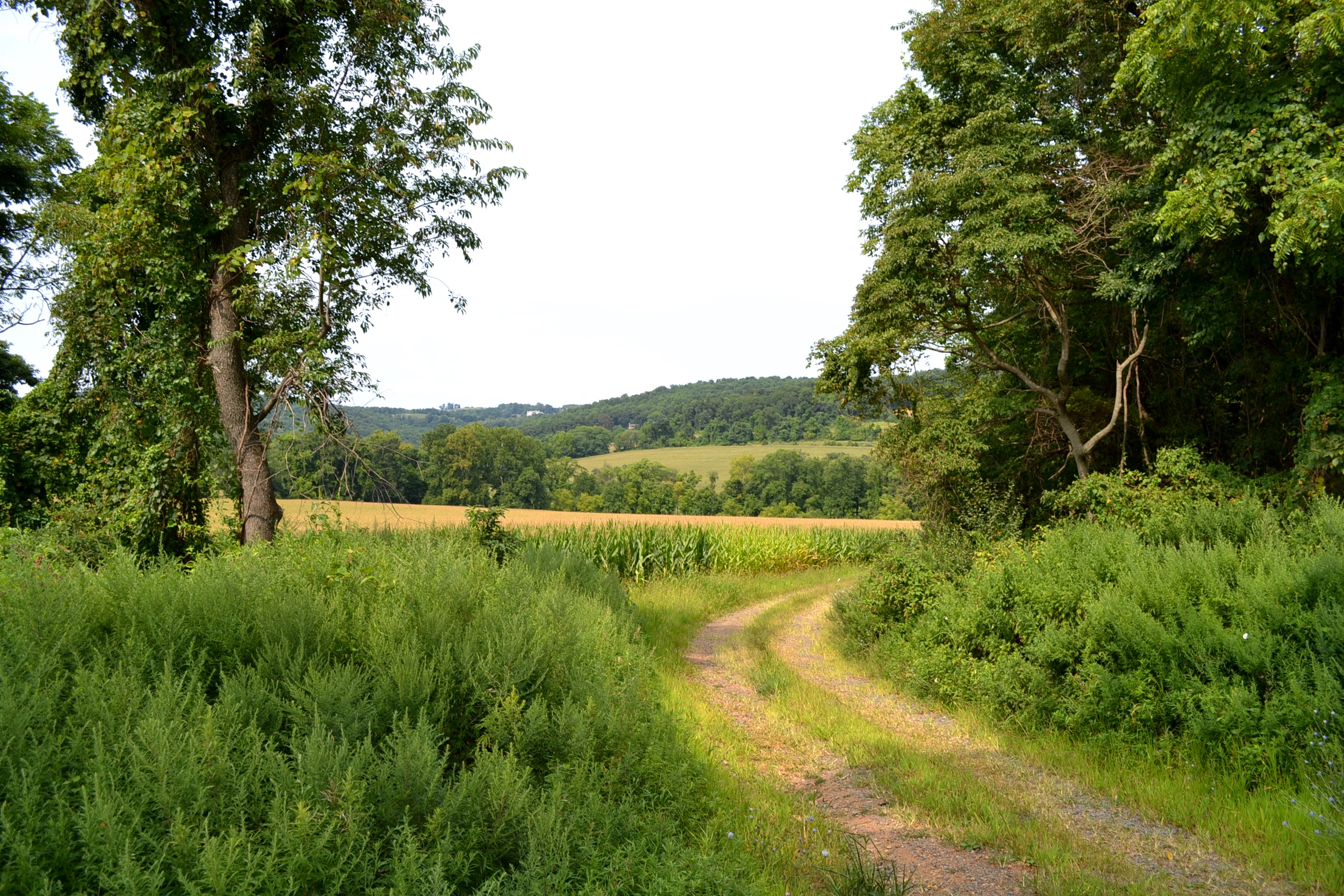
- Interactive map of Hill and Dale Preserve
- Type: Nature Preserve
- Location: Hunterdon County, New Jersey, USA
- Coordinates: 40°40′46″N 74°47′00″WGoogle Maps
- Area: 292 acres (118 ha)
- Created: 2011
- Manager: New Jersey Conservation Foundation
- Open: All year. Dawn till dusk
- Hiking trails: Three Trails, ~2.8 miles. Difficulty mild to moderate
- Habitats: Wooded, rolling hills & Agricultural
- Parking: yes
- Website: Official website

The Hill and Dale Preserve is an approximately 300-acre (120 ha) nature reserve located in Lebanon, New Jersey. The preserve is primarily a combination of open fields and wooded sections. Higher elevations provide scenic views of the Watchung Mountains, Round Valley Reservoir and Cushetunk Mountain. A portion of Rockaway Creek and its tributaries run through the preserve.

There are approximately 2.3 miles (3.7 km) of hiking trails within the park, and many types of bird and animal species can be spotted, including Cooper’s hawk, wood thrush, bobcat, fox and black bear. The park is physically connected to adjacent Hell Mountain Preserve.

Development rights to 100 acres of the preserve have been purchased to ensure that no development can occur, but this land still remains in private hands. These 100 acres have been permanently limited to agricultural use.

The preserve is managed by New Jersey Conservation Foundation.

== History ==
The preserve was first opened in 2011 with an initial land purchase of 115 acres Subsequent land purchases have extended the preserve to the current 292 acres. Hill & Dale farm has existed first as a dairy farm and later as a horse farm The land was acquired through a combination of multiple public and private funding sources.

== Location ==
The preserve is located in Lebanon NJ. For driving directions go to 3 Parsonage lot Road and look for the small (unmarked) parking lot by Hell Mountain Preserve. This lot is just across the street from Hill & Dale. GPS 40°41'00.6"N 74°46'55.5"W takes you to the parking lot.

== Recreation ==
- Hiking
- Horseback Riding
- Bird watching
- Photography

== Points of interest ==
- Scenic Views of surrounding countryside and mountains
- Historic Dutch style barns, fields and pastures
- Rockaway Creek

== Hiking ==
The preserve has ~2.3 miles of marked trails: red/orange*1.2 miles, blue 1.0 mile and purple ~800 ft. The preserve begins in the Rockaway Creek Valley and includes some steep climbs. Overall difficulty is moderate. The trails skirt portions of active farmland within the preserve.

*Trail map says the trail blazes are red though they are shown as orange on the map and in the field

Trail map:
