= Katonah (Native American leader) =

Ramapo leader
- Preceded by: Powahay

Personal details
- Resting place: Katonah's Wood, off Rt. 22
- Spouse(s): Cantitoe, also called Mustato
- Relations: Father, Onox (the older); grandfather, Ponus. Uncles, Tapgow (Taphance) and Owenoke. Brother, Onox (the younger). Eldest son, Wackemawa (Wawkamawe), Son, Papiag (Pohag); daughter married Sam Mohawk (Chickens Warrups)
- Children: Wackemawa, Papiag
- Parent: Onox

Katonah was a Lenape sachem who led parts of two bands of Wappinger in what is today the far southeastern part of mainland New York State and southwestern Connecticut: the Wiechquaeskeck in the Greenwich, Stamford areas of Connecticut, and the Ramapo inhabiting that of today's Bedford, New York.

Some believe the Ramapo Sachemdom - which later relocated across the Hudson River in both New York and New Jersey (for whom today's town of Ramapo, New York, and the Ramapo Mountains of New Jersey are named) - was part of the Tankiteke chieftaincy of the Wappinger (itself effectively a league or confederation of a dozen or so bands, sovereign to itself but linguistically at least a Lenape people).

The land of today's town of Bedford was purchased from Chief Katonah.

== Biography ==
Katonah was the sachem of the condensed remnants of a Wappinger people called the Ramapo, who are claimed as ancestors by the Ramapough Mountain Indians. He lived in the area in the late seventeenth century. Records show that in 1708 the Ridgefield settlers petitioned the colonial General Assembly at Hartford to remove the Ramapo. Katonah sold the Ramapo lands of 20,000 acres for 100 Pounds Sterling to the "Proprietors of Ridgefield". His name appears on land deeds up to 1743. The Remnant tribe of the Ramapo scattered to the north and west.

Chief Katonah was the son of Onox (the elder) and the grandson of Ponus, Sachem of the Rippowams. Katonah was the successor to Powahay, his brother. Katonah had a brother named Onox and a son named Papiag who also signed land deeds. His uncle, Tapgow, son of Ponus, signed many land deeds in northern New Jersey including the Schuyler Patent or the Ramapo Tract Deed in 1710 in northern New Jersey. Katonah was married to Cantitoe, sometimes known as Mustato, said to be of the Pompton tribe. Their daughter married Samuel Mohawk alias Chickens Warrups.

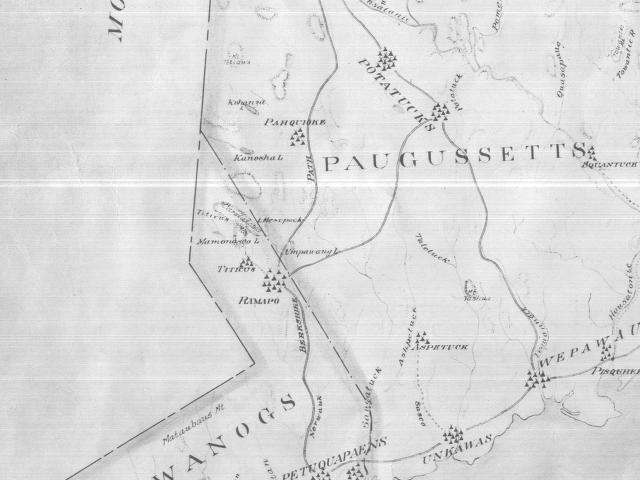
Map of Ramapoo Tribe 1625

Legend has it that Katonah died of grief after his wife and son were killed by lightning. He is said to be buried with them in Katonah's Wood, off New York State Route 22. William Will's poem Katonah describes him laid beneath a giant boulder and the others under two smaller immediately adjacent boulders.

== Legacy ==
The hamlet of Katonah, New York, located within Bedford, is named for Chief Katonah.

In 2007, Martha Stewart Living Omnimedia applied for a trademark on the Katonah name for a line of furniture. Members of the Ramapough Lenape Nation joined forces with local residents to oppose it.
