= Taphow =

Munsee leader

Personal details
- Spouse: Awowas (Wawowus)
- Relations: Brothers, Onox(the older) and Owenoke.
- Children: Quatowquechuck
- Parent(s): Father, Ponus. Son, Quatowquechuck. Nephews, Katonah and Powahay.

Taphow (Note: Because the Dutch used phonetic spelling to write his name, it appears on deeds in a variety of ways, including Tapehome, Tapehow, Tapgow, Taphance, Taphaow, Taphow, Tapphow, Tephgan, Topgow, and Tophow.) (/ˈtæpˌhoʊ/ TAP-hoh) a Native American Munsee sachem in Connecticut, was the son of Ponus and the uncle to Katonah. Taphow, known as the "Sakimore and Commander in Chief of all those Indians inhabiting in northern New Jersey, signed many land deeds "in the lands of Taphow and his relations" including the Ramapo Tract in 1700, the Kakiat Patent in 1701 and witnessed the sale of the Wawayanda Patent. Taphow's wife, Awowas (Wawowus), and son Quatowquechuck also signed on some land deeds. Taphow was accused of murder in Connecticut but was acquitted for lack of evidence.

== Bibliography ==
- References of Robert S. Grumet (1991). Orr, David G.; Campana, Douglas V. (eds.). The People of Minisink: Papers from the 1989 Delaware Water Gap Symposium. Philadelphia: National Park Service, Mid-Atlantic Region. hdl:2027/wu.89073127573.
- Orcutt, Samuel (1880). The History of the Old Town of Derby, Connecticut, 1642-1880. Press of Springfield Printing Company.
- Selleck, Rev. Charles M. (1896). Norwalk. The author.
