= Chickens Warrups =

Chickens Warrups, in some accounts referenced as Chicken Warrups or Sam Mohawk, was a Native American who lived in the southwestern part of Connecticut in the late 17th century and 18th century, at the time colonial settlers were establishing town governments, church parishes, and farms in the region. Warrups' name appears on multiple deeds awarding land to colonial settlers.

== Early life and relocation to Connecticut ==
A family ancestry study based on oral history suggests Warrups was the son of a Mohawk sagamore named Ky-ne. The same account states that in his youth Warrups killed a member of the Onondaga tribe and was banished from the Five Nations confederacy that included the Mohawk people. He relocated to the area straddling the border of Connecticut and New York, and was captured by a tribe led by the sachem Katonah (one of multiple spellings of that name referenced in historical documents). Warrups is thought to have married a daughter of Katonah and relocated to Fairfield, Connecticut.

There is dispute as to whether Warrups killed a Native American in Fairfield; he again moved, however, this time several miles north to land that would eventually be included as part of Redding, Connecticut. There, Warrups established a village of Native Americans who had become displaced from other tribal units.

== Land dealings ==
Settlers began eyeing unclaimed land north of Fairfield for new farmland, and colonial authorities began distributing grants of land in that area in the late 1600s, with settlers relocating in the early 1700s into the area occupied by Warrups village.

Redding's official town seal, dated 1714, depicts founder John Read under the boughs of a tree purchasing land from Chickens Warrups, with another settler and Native American in attendance.

Read is thought to have established a homestead in the vicinity of the village by 1711, and is credited with initiating the process that led to the creation of the town of Redding.

"Chickens ... seems to have been a strange mixture of Indian shrewdness, rascality and cunning, and was in continual difficulty with the settlers concerning the deeds he gave them," wrote historian Charles Burr Todd. "In 1720 he was suspected by the colonists of an attempt to bring the Mohawks and other western tribes down upon them." Todd found three petitions by Warrups, preserved in colonial records, in which he complained of injustices in his land dealings with settlers.

In 1748 or 1749, Warrups relinquished rights to 100 acres of land he claimed he held in the Redding area, exchanging it for 200 acres of land in the Scattacook area (also referenced variously as Scatacook and Schaticook) in New Milford, Connecticut. In 1762, after falling ill, Warrups sold 30 acres of that land to pay off debt and provide for living expenses; according to historian John W. De Forest, Warrups died "not many years after." Different sources list his death between 1765 and 1769.

== Descendants and legacy ==
Accounts of Chickens Warrups are complicated by some references to a son named Thomas Chickens Warrups (also known by derivative appellations in varying records), who is thought to have died during the same decade as the elder Warrups; and with some accounts not sufficiently distinguishing the activities of each man.

During the American Revolutionary War, the elder Warrups' grandson Tom Warrups became a guide, scout and messenger for Continental Army forces under the command of Major General Israel Putnam, and was blamed by some local farmers for leading raids to steal provisions for soldiers encamped nearby during the winter of 1778–79. Authors James Lincoln Collier and Christopher Collier included Tom Warrups among the characters in My Brother Sam Is Dead, a historical fiction novel for young adults.

In 2002, the state of Connecticut and other signatories disputed that the descendants of Warrups could be included in a proposed Schaghticoke Tribal Nation proposed for Connecticut, on grounds Chickens Warrups joined an existing group of Native Americans. The U.S. government denied tribal nation status for the Schaghticoke group, who hoped an affirmative decision would allow them to start the process of getting approval for a casino. Redding's working farms today include Warrup's Farm, which traces its ownership of the land through marriage to Read.
