= New Jersey Conservation Foundation =

Nonprofit organization

- Formation: 1960; 66 years ago
- Type: Nonprofit
- Tax ID no.: 22-6065456
- Legal status: 501(c)(3)
- Headquarters: Far Hills, New Jersey
- Region served: New Jersey
- Trustee President: Louise Currey Wilson
- Co-Executive Director: Tom Gilbert
- Co-Executive Director: Alison E. Mitchell
- Co-Executive Director: John S. Watson, Jr.
- Website: https://www.njconservation.org
- Formerly called: Great Swamp Committee

The New Jersey Conservation Foundation is a private non-profit organization that works to preserve land and natural resources in the state of New Jersey. Since its founding in 1960, the Foundation has protected 140,000 acres of open space, farmland, and parks.

== History ==
The foundation was established in 1960 as the Great Swamp Committee. The goal of the committee was to prevent the building of a large airport in the Great Swamp.

== Land Stewardship ==
As of May 2025 New Jersey Conservation Foundation managed 19 preserves throughout New Jersey:

- Apshawa Preserve
- Hill & Dale Preserve
- Maureen Ogden Preserve
- Skyline Preserve
- Metedeconk Preserve
- Mount Rose Preserve
- Rainbow Hill at Sourland Mountain Preserve
- Wickecheoke Creek Preserve
- Burden Hill Forest Preserve
- Candace McKee Ashmun Preserve
- Daniels Preserve
- Dorothy Preserve
- Evert Trail Preserve
- Franklin Parker Preserve
- Gateway Park
- Lakes Bay Preserve
- Menantico Creek Preserve
- Michael Huber Prairie Warbler Preserve
- Rechnitz Pine Barrens Preserve
