= North Jersey District Water Supply Commission =

Government agency

- NJDWSC

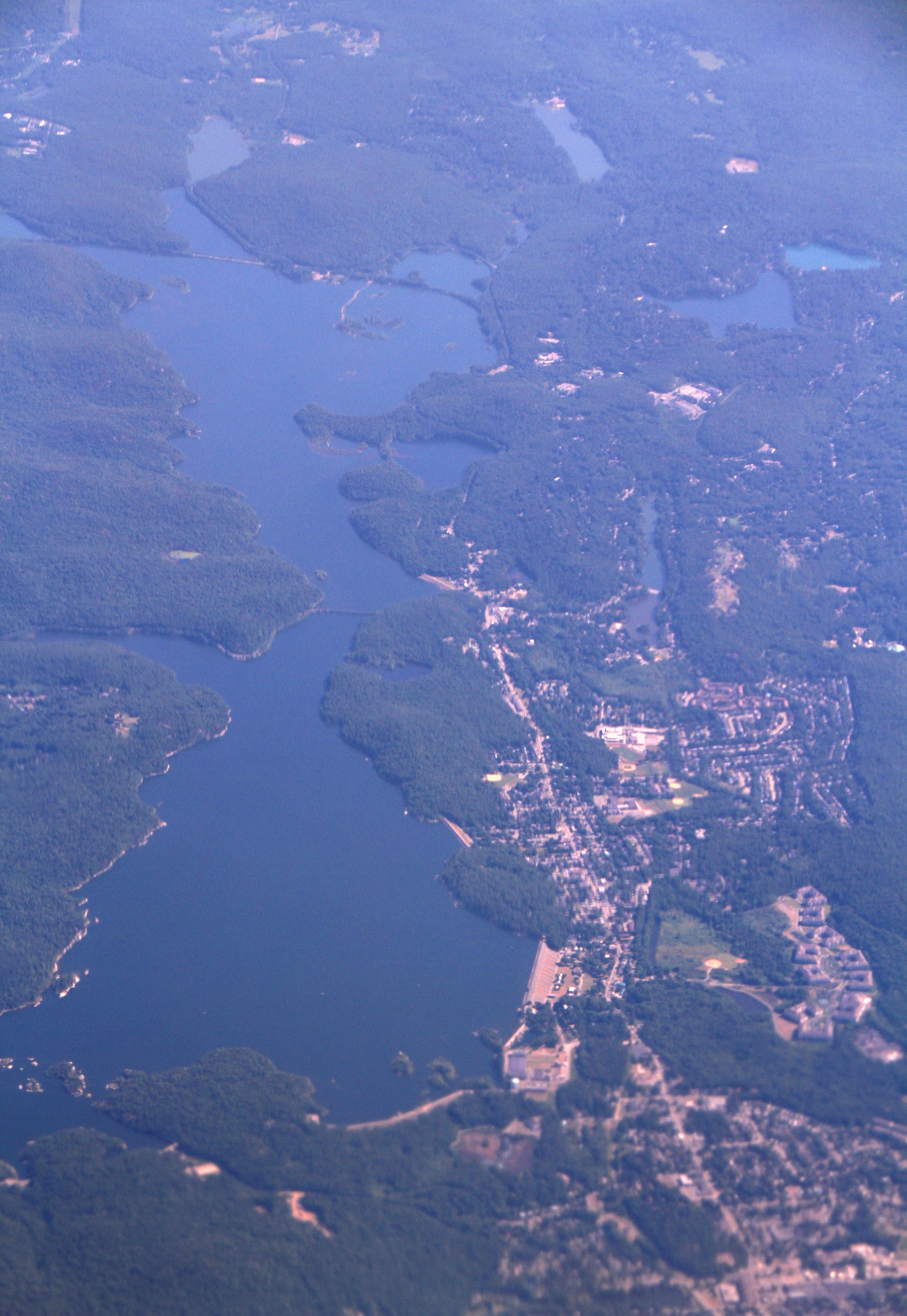
- Wanaque Reservoir, the major NJDWSC reservoir

Agency overview
- Formed: 1916; 110 years ago
- Type: Public utilities commission
- Jurisdiction: Northern New Jersey
- Headquarters: 1 F A Orechio Drive, Wanaque, New Jersey 07465; 41°02′27″N 74°17′52″W
- Employees: 130
- Agency executives: Saily M. Avelenda, Executive Director; Timothy J. Eustace, Deputy Executive Director
- Parent department: Board of Commissioners
- Parent agency: Government of New Jersey
- Key document: Mission Statement
- Website: www.njdwsc.com

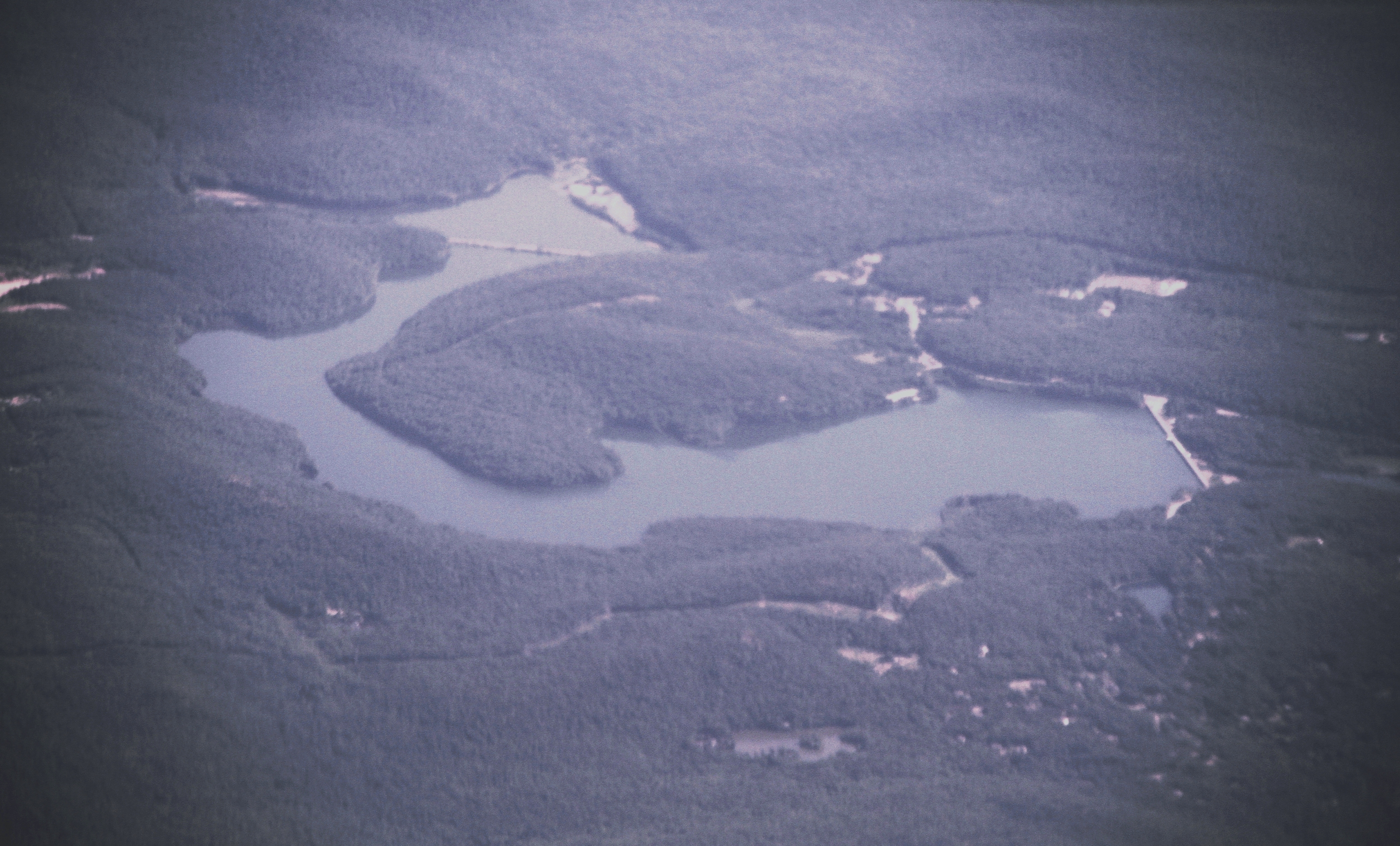
Monksville Reservoir, the commission's secondary reservoir

The North Jersey District Water Supply Commission is a public authority in Northern New Jersey operating a water supply network for its member communities. Established in 1916, the commission oversees the largest regional water supply in New Jersey, consisting of 95 acres of watershed area, the Wanaque Reservoir, the Monksville Reservoir, and associated works.

The total possible service area is defined as the twelve northernmost counties in New Jersey. Current member communities are, in order of usage, Newark, Paterson, Kearny, Bayonne, Passaic, Wayne, Bloomfield, Clifton, Montclair, Nutley, Cedar Grove, and Glen Ridge. The commission also sends water to Suez North America, another regional utility.
