= Apshawa Preserve =

County park in West Milford, New Jersey

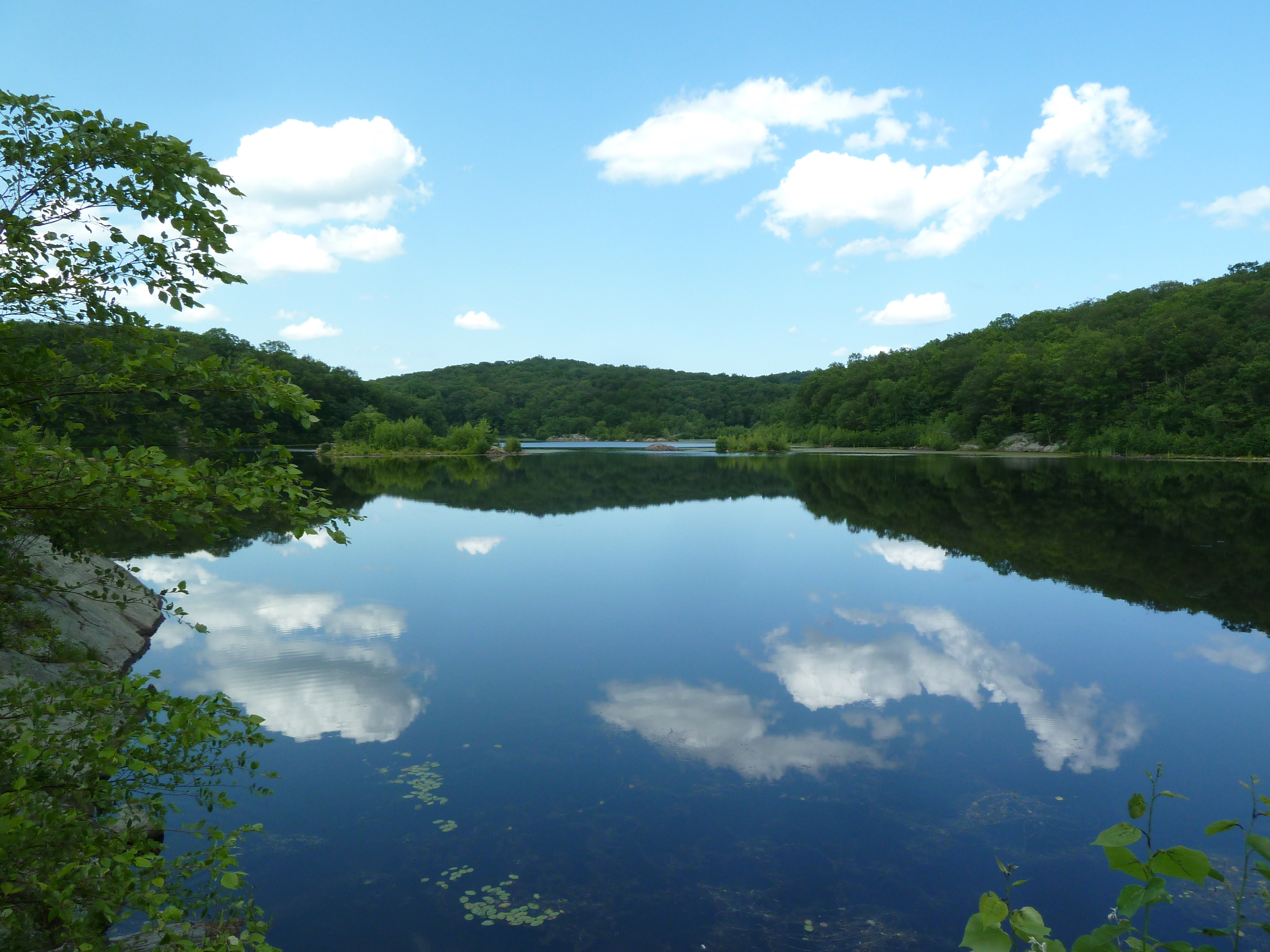
- Butler Reservoir in the Apshawa Preserve
- Interactive map of Apshawa Preserve
- Type: County park
- Location: West Milford, New Jersey, U.S.
- Coordinates: 41°01′35″N 74°23′00″W
- Area: 576 acres (233 ha)
- Created: 1928
- Operator: Passaic County and New Jersey Conservation Foundation
- Open: Year round. Dawn till dusk
- Hiking trails: 3 loop trails. 5 connector. ~5 miles total
- Website: Official website

The Apshawa Preserve is a 576 acres (233 ha) nature preserve in the highlands of northern New Jersey, United States. Located off Northwood Drive in West Milford, the preserve is managed by the New Jersey Conservation Foundation and by Passaic County. The preserve is mostly wooded with oak and maple.

The Apshawa is a brook, a tributary of the Pequannock River; it flows through the preserve and is dammed to form the 40 acres (16 ha) Butler Reservoir within the preserve. The reservoir once served to provide water to Butler. Apshawa Preserve includes a network of hiking trails and a 43-acre reservoir.

Since 2010 part of the preserve is protected by a gated deer fence to protect native plants that otherwise would be decimated by a high density deer population.

In September 2014, 22-year-old student Darsh Patel was mauled by a 300-pound (140 kg) black bear in the preserve and died. He was the first known person in New Jersey history to be killed by a black bear.

== Location and access ==
The Apshawa Preserve is open year round from dawn to dusk for recreation, and can be accessed from 4 Macopin Road, West Milford. Onsite parking is provided in a gravel parking lot that is located off Northwood Drive (turn off of Macopin), where hikers will find a kiosk with trail maps as well as trailheads. Apshawa Preserve cannot yet be accessed via public transportation.

== Hiking ==
There are about five miles of marked trails including three loop trails (Red 1.6 miles; Green 1.7 miles; Yellow .5 miles). There are five other connector trails which create a variety of possibilities. The red loop trail goes all the way around the Butler Reservoir and is accessible by the 1 mile blue trail from the parking lot.

Apshawa Preserve Trail map

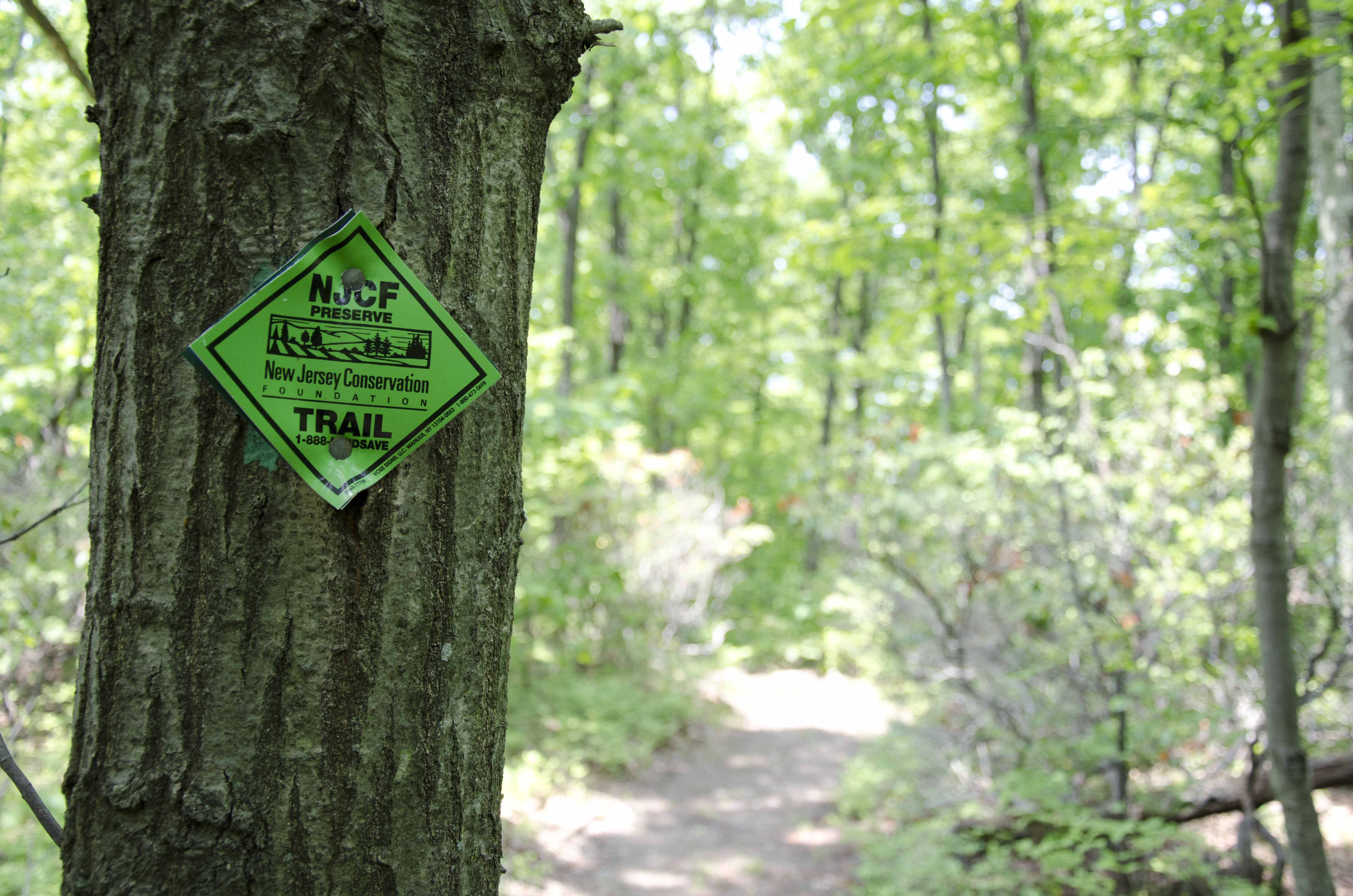
Green Trail Marker
