= William Will =

American pewterer

William Will (January 27, 1742, Nieuwied-am-Rhein – February 14, 1798, Philadelphia) was an American pewterer and officer of the Continental Army. He was the fourth son of pewterer Johann (later John) Will, with whose family he came to New York in 1752. He served his apprenticeship in the workshop of his brother Heinrich (later Henry) in New York, before moving to Philadelphia with his brother Phillip.

In 1776, despite his young age, Will was able to raise a company of infantry, and eventually rose to the rank of colonel in various regiments of the Continental Army. In 1777 he was appointed, along with Charles Willson Peale and four others, to the 'Commission for the Seizure of the Effects of Traitors'. He subsequently served in various other public offices.

Despite this extensive involvement in public life, Will was able to maintain a successful business in the manufacture and sale of pewter.

During his career, Will produced an extensive variety of pewter wares, from mundane household items such as plates and tankards, to ecclesiastic pewter such as communion flagons and chalices.

A primary criterion in assessing the quality of pewter is the content of the alloy. While many other American pewterers achieved a standard equal to Will's in this regard, his work is noted for its extraordinarily fine workmanship, and the ambition of his designs. He is particularly known for teapots.
