= Pompton River =

River in New Jersey, United States

Coordinates: 40.969886°N 74.282384°W

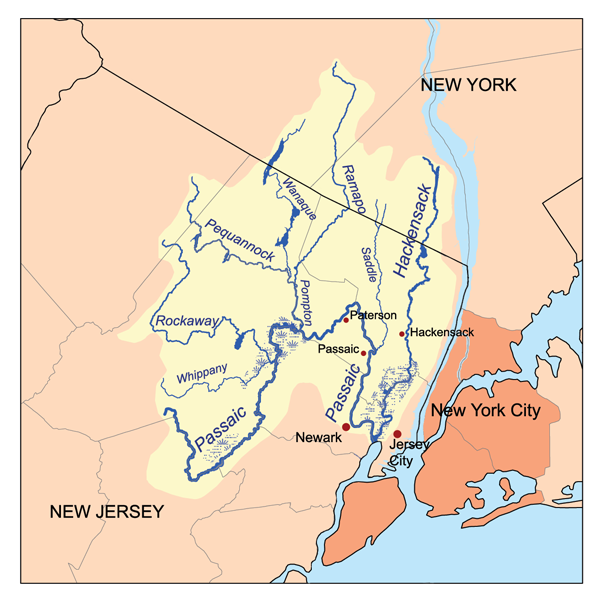
Map of the Passaic/Hackensack watershed.

The Pompton River is a tributary of the Passaic River, approximately 8 miles (13 km) long, in Passaic County in northern New Jersey in the United States.

It is formed south of the borough of Pompton Lakes by the confluence of the Ramapo and Pequannock rivers. It flows south, passing between Lincoln Park and Pequannock Township (to the west) and Wayne (to the east). It enters the Passaic north of Fairfield Township at an area called Two Bridges. Its watershed encompasses a section of the Ramapo Mountains along the New York-New Jersey border in the rural suburbs of New York City. It is the main tributary by volume of the Passaic. A portion of the river's water is diverted to the nearby Wanaque Reservoir.

The low-lying flat areas of Pompton Plains in Pequannock Township are prone to flooding from the Pompton River. In the wake of the heavy rains from Hurricane Irene in August 2011, the river overflowed, cresting at a record level of 25.54 feet (7.78 m) on August 29, causing flooding that displaced hundreds of residents.

The proposed Passaic River Flood Tunnel would alleviate flooding by taking water from the Pompton River in Wayne (which also experiences frequent floods) and sending it through a tunnel measuring 40 feet (12 m) in diameter for the 20 miles (32 km) to Newark Bay.

== Tributaries ==
- Pequannock River
- Ramapo River

== See also ==
- List of rivers of New Jersey
- Pompton people
