= Pequannock River =

River in New Jersey, United States

Coordinates: 41°04′40″N 74°29′25″W

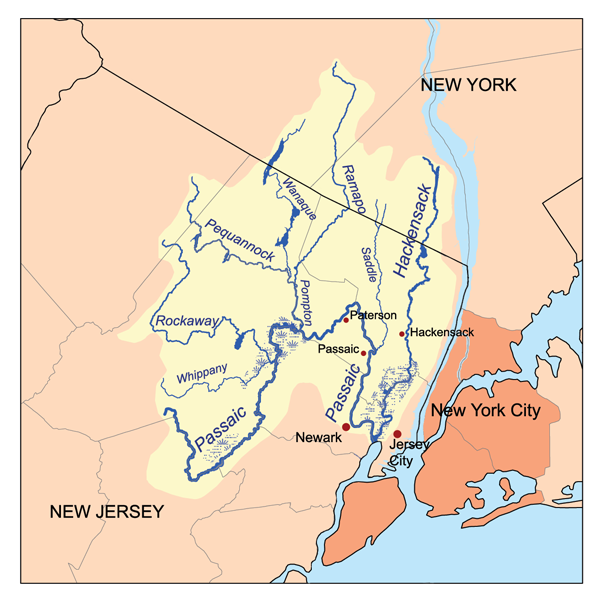
Map of the Passaic/Hackensack watershed.

The Pequannock River is a tributary of the Pompton River, approximately 20 miles (32 km) long, located in northern New Jersey in the United States.

== Course ==
It rises in eastern Sussex County, near Highland Lakes on the north side of Hamburg Mountain. It flows southeast to Stockholm, then east-southeast, in a gap north of Green Pond Mountain and other ridges, past Butler and Bloomingdale. It joins the Ramapo River at Pompton Plains in Pequannock Township to form the Pompton.

In its upper course, it forms part of the county line between Passaic and Morris counties.

== Recreational uses ==
It is impounded near its source to form the Oak Ridge Reservoir. The river is relatively unspoiled compared to other rivers in the region. It is a popular spot for recreation trout fishing in its upper reaches. Fishing, hunting, and other recreational uses of the river and watershed are controlled by the City of Newark's Division of Watershed Development, which requires permits for all such uses.

The Pequannock watershed is the source of most of Newark's water supply. The lands and water were purchased under the mayoralty of Newark mayor Joseph E. Haynes (1884–1894).

== Tributaries ==
- Apshawa Brook
- Wanaque River

== See also ==
- List of New Jersey rivers
