= Prompton =

Prompton may refer to:

- Prompton, Pennsylvania, a borough in Wayne County
- Prompton State Park, in Wayne County, Pennsylvania
