= Hewitt, New Jersey =

Populated place in Passaic County, New Jersey, US

- Census-designated place
- Location in Passaic County Location in New Jersey Location in the United States
- Coordinates: 41°08′30″N 74°18′39″W
- Country: United States
- State: New Jersey
- County: Passaic
- Township: West Milford
- Named for: Abram Hewitt

Area
  - Total: 5.91 sq mi (15.31 km^{2})
  - Land: 4.62 sq mi (11.97 km^{2})
  - Water: 1.29 sq mi (3.34 km^{2})
- Elevation: 430 ft (131 m)

Population (2020)
  - Total: 1,912
  - Density: 413.7/sq mi (159.72/km^{2})
- ZIP Code: 07421
- Area code: 973
- FIPS code: 34-31110
- GNIS feature ID: 0877071

Hewitt is an unincorporated community and census-designated place (CDP) located within West Milford Township in Passaic County, in the U.S. state of New Jersey. The area is served as United States Postal Service ZIP Code 07421. It is named for Abram Hewitt. As of the 2020 census, Hewitt had a population of 1,912.

== Demographics ==
Historical population
| Census | Pop. | Note | %± |
|---|---|---|---|
| 2020 | 1,912 | | — |
U.S. Decennial Census; 2020

Hewitt was first listed as a census designated place in the 2020 U.S. census.

Hewitt CDP, New Jersey – Racial and ethnic composition Note: the US Census treats Hispanic/Latino as an ethnic category. This table excludes Latinos from the racial categories and assigns them to a separate category. Hispanics/Latinos may be of any race.
| Race / Ethnicity (NH = Non-Hispanic) | Pop 2020 | 2020 |
|---|---|---|
| White alone (NH) | 1,655 | 86.56% |
| Black or African American alone (NH) | 13 | 0.68% |
| Native American or Alaska Native alone (NH) | 8 | 0.42% |
| Asian alone (NH) | 23 | 1.20% |
| Native Hawaiian or Pacific Islander alone (NH) | 0 | 0.00% |
| Other race alone (NH) | 8 | 0.42% |
| Mixed race or Multiracial (NH) | 77 | 4.03% |
| Hispanic or Latino (any race) | 128 | 6.69% |
| Total | 1,912 | 100.00% |

According to the 2020–2024 American Community Survey 5-year estimates, ZIP Code Tabulation Area (ZCTA) 07421 had a population of 6,977.

== Sites of interest ==
- Long Pond Ironworks State Park
- Long Pond Ironworks
