= Greenwood Lake =

- Quampium (Munsee language)
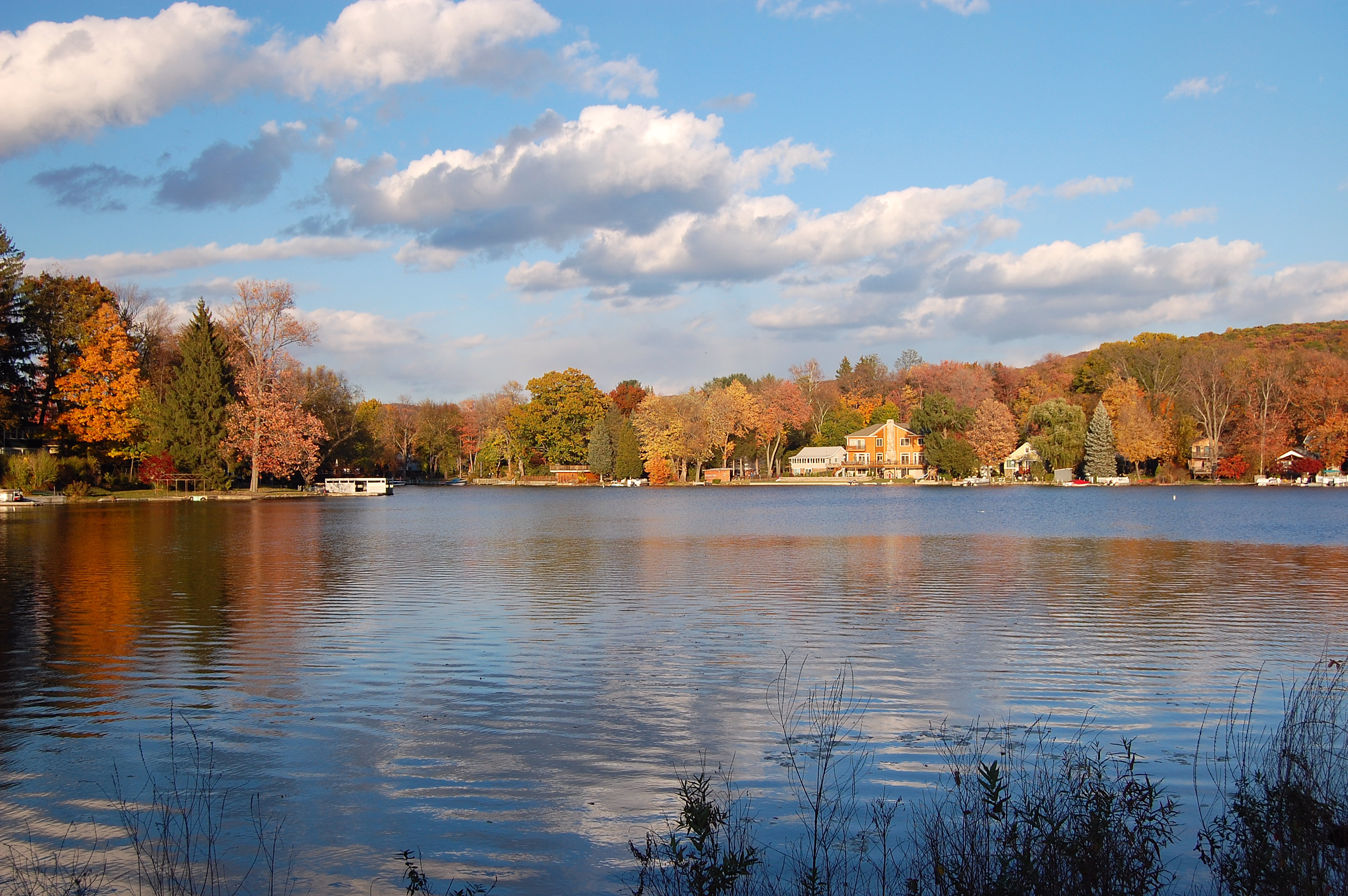

- Location within Passaic County, New Jersey Location within New Jersey Location within the United States
- Location: Orange County, New York / Passaic County, New Jersey
- Coordinates: 41.179461°N 74.329977°W
- Type: reservoir, natural lake
- Primary outflows: Wanaque River
- Basin countries: United States
- Surface area: 1,920 acres (7.8 km^{2})
- Surface elevation: 623 ft (190 m)
- Islands: Fox Island (a.k.a. Pine Island), Storms Island, Chapel Island

Greenwood Lake is an interstate lake approximately seven miles (11 km) long, straddling the border of New York and New Jersey. It is located in the Town of Warwick and the Village of Greenwood Lake, New York (in Orange County) and West Milford, New Jersey (in Passaic County). It is the source of the Wanaque River.

The lake was originally called "Quampium" by the Munsee Native Americans who lived there. It was renamed "Long Pond" by Europeans, who settled the area in the 18th century for farming and ironmaking, and eventually came to be re-christened "Greenwood Lake."

It was dammed up c. 1765 by Peter Hasenclever of The American Company to increase the size of the lake for water power used downstream at the Long Pond Ironworks. The original dam was located even with today's Fox Island, with most of the lake extending north of the state line. In 1837, the lake was again dammed, but at the location of the current dam, this time by the Morris Canal & Banking Company to supply water to the Pompton Feeder of the Morris Canal. The enlarged lake now flooded the Succor Brook at the northern end, forming the East Arm, surrounded "Lime Ridge" to create Chapel Island, and flooded the extreme southern end, including parts of Belcher Creek.

The enlarged lake began to attract tourists. The Montclair and Greenwood Lake Railway reached the lake at Awosting around 1874, and the "State Line" (later Sterling Forest) depot was established around 1876. (This railway later became the New York and Greenwood Lake Railway, and then the Greenwood Lake Division of the Erie Railway.) During its resort era, several steamboats operated on the lake, including the Greenwood Lake Transportation Company's Arlington, Milford, and their side-wheeler, Montclair, built in 1876, which had two decks and is reported to have been capable of carrying from 200 to 400 passengers. There were also other steamers that were privately run, such as the Pioneer and the Anita, and smaller steam launches, such as the Wilhelmina, the Carrie T., and the Ferncliff, run by specific hotels. These steamboats met the trains and took passengers to the various resorts around the lake in both states.

There is a seaplane area on the lake, a few large marinas and lakeside restaurants with docks. Greenwood Lake Airport just south of the lake has a runway long enough to handle small jets.

There are numerous marinas and restaurants along Greenwood Lake.

In 2011, the film The Magic of Belle Isle starring Morgan Freeman was filmed along the lake.

== Works about the lake ==
Jasper Francis Cropsey created several paintings of Greenwood Lake beginning in 1843. Cropsey painted many paintings of the area such as American Harvesting (1864), Greenwood Lake (1870), Fisherman's House, Greenwood Lake (1877), and Cooley Homestead–Greenwood Lake (1886). Cropsey met and married Maria Cooley, daughter of Issac P. Cooley, in 1847 so continued to visit the area for many years.

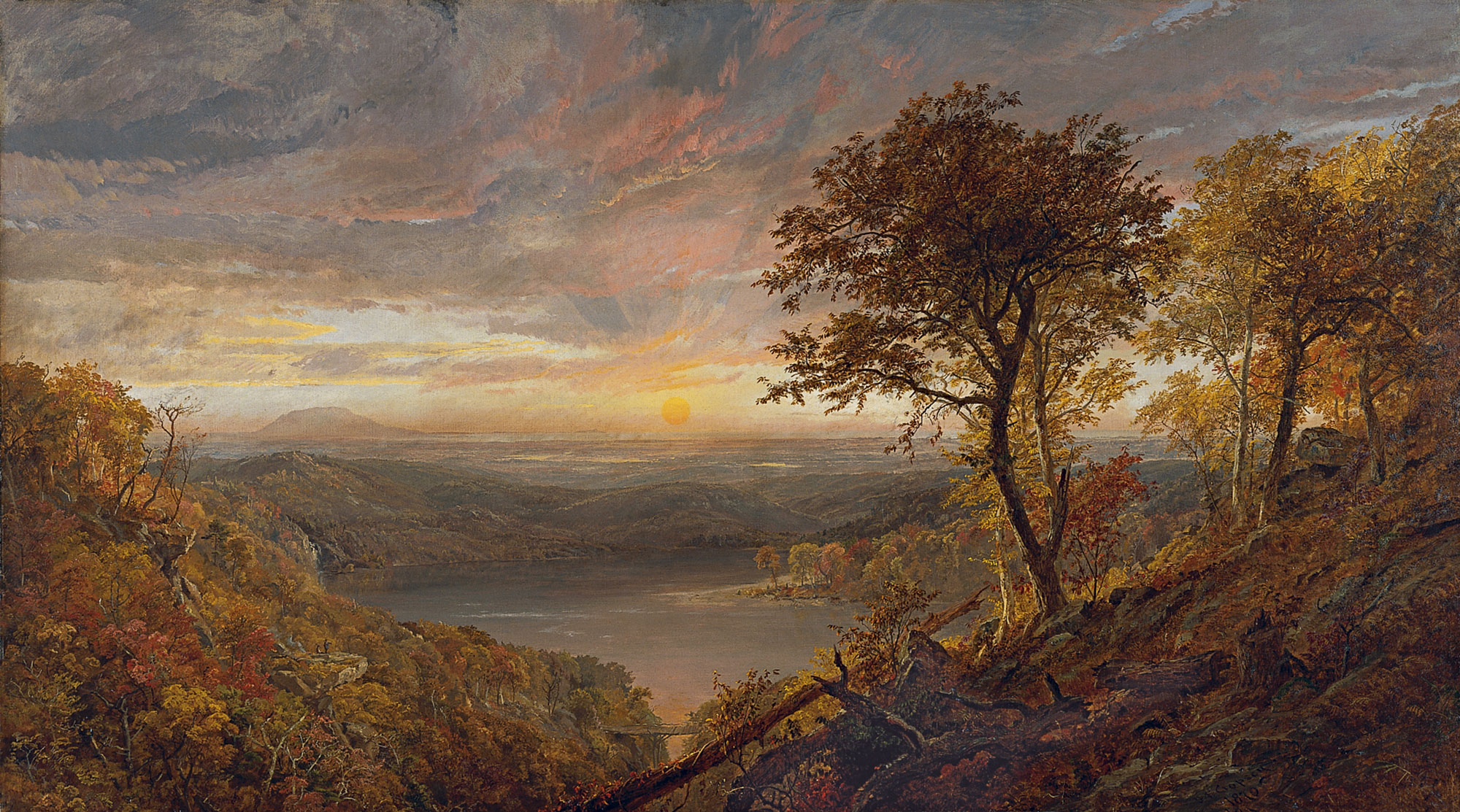
Greenwood Lake, Jasper Francis Cropsey, 1870.

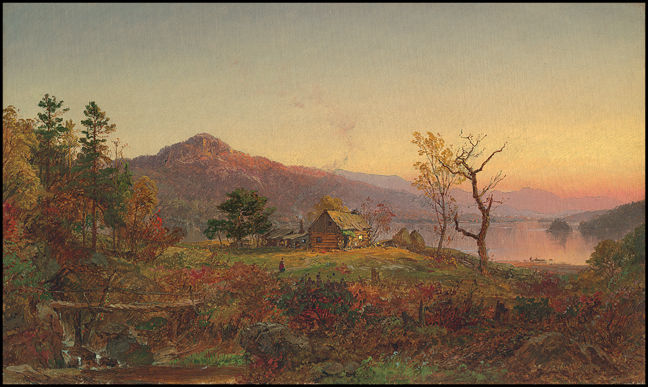
Fisherman's House, Greenwood Lake (New Jersey), Jasper Francis Crospey, 1877.
