= Wanaque River =

River in New Jersey, United States

Coordinates: 41.043393°N 74.294992°W

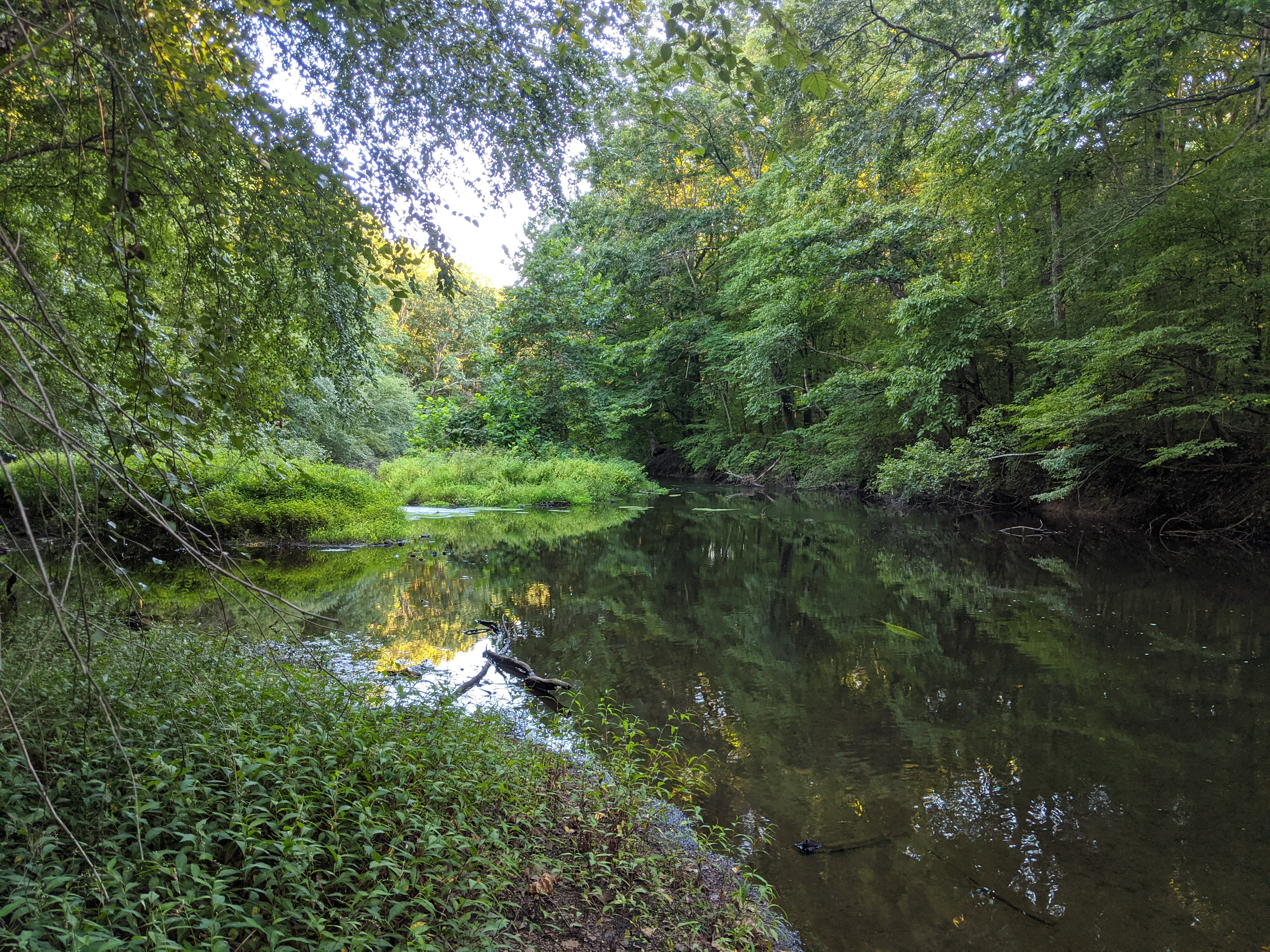
Wanaque River near Back Beach Park in Wanaque

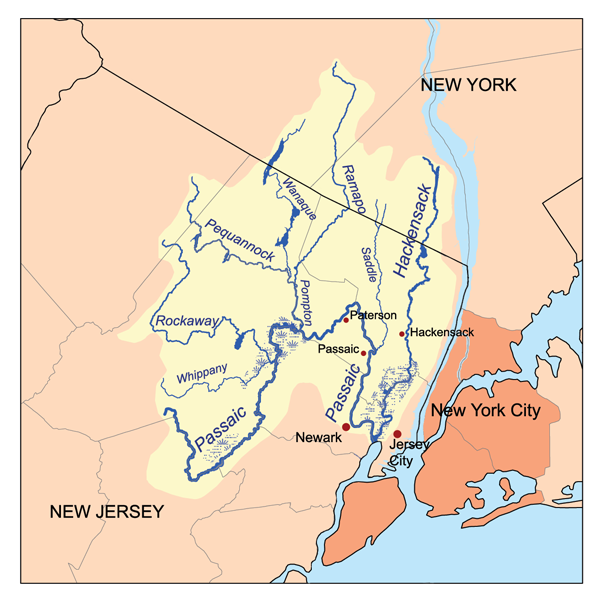
Map of the Passaic/Hackensack watershed.

The Wanaque River (Native American for "place of the sassafras") is a tributary of the Pequannock River in Passaic County in northern New Jersey in the United States.

Once known as the Long Pond River, the source of the Wanaque River is Greenwood Lake, once known as Long Pond (not to be confused with the nearby village of Greenwood Lake in the state of New York).

Both Greenwood Lake and the surrounding Sterling Forest watershed straddle the border of the states of New Jersey and New York.

Downstream, the construction of dams at Monks and Wanaque created the Monksville and Wanaque reservoirs, respectively.

From the Raymond Dam of the Wanaque Reservoir, the river flows to its confluence with the Pequannock River.

== See also ==
- List of rivers of New Jersey
