= Wanaque Reservoir =

New Jersey reservoir

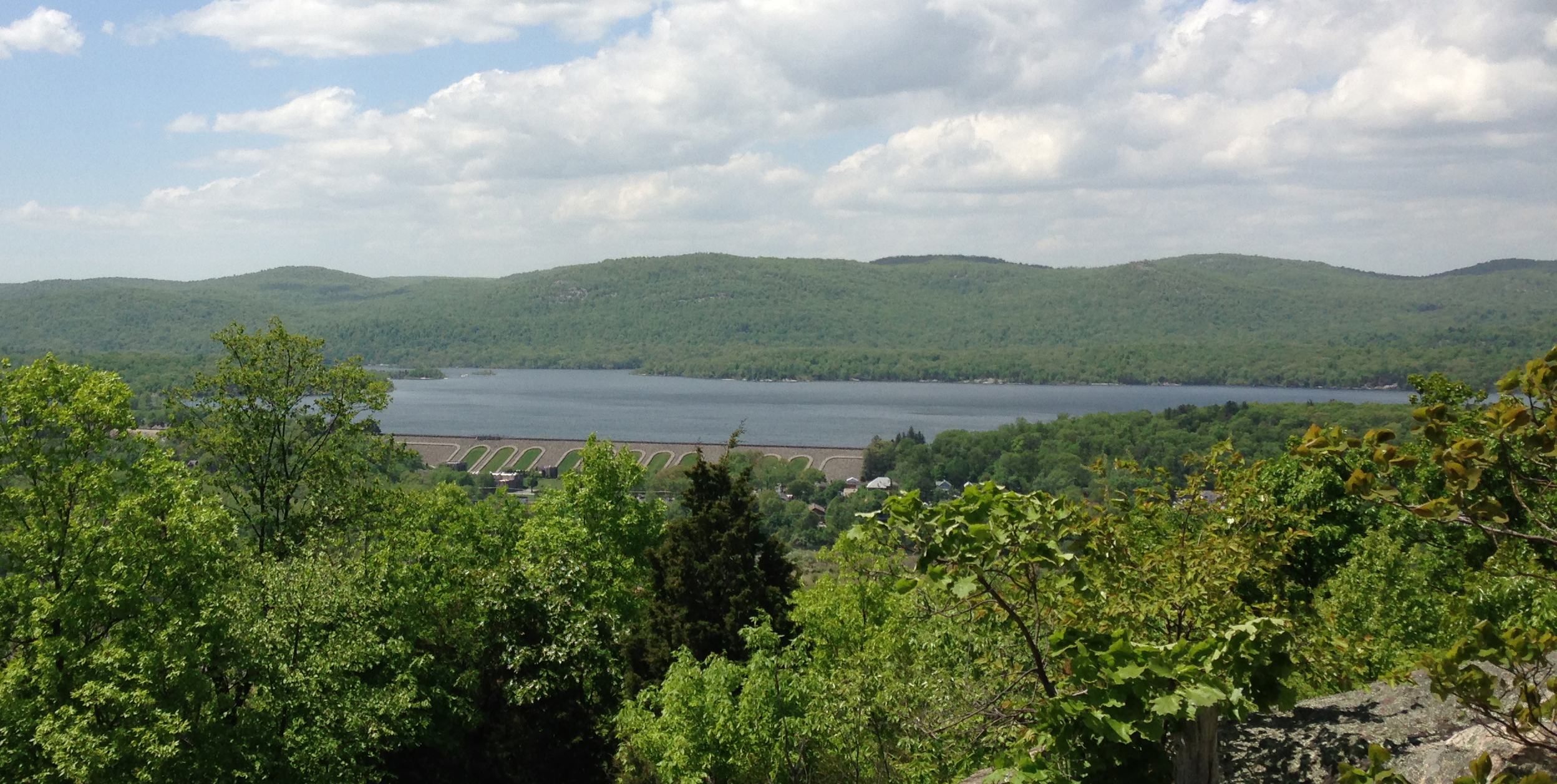
- View of the southern portion of Wanaque Reservoir from Wanaque Ridge in Ramapo Mountain State Forest

- Location within New Jersey Location within the United States
- Location: Ringwood / Wanaque, Passaic County, New Jersey
- Coordinates: 41.069646°N 74.290953°W
- Type: Reservoir
- Primary inflows: Wanaque River, Ramapo River (via Pompton Lakes intake), Pompton River (via Two Bridges intake)
- Primary outflows: Wanaque River
- Basin countries: United States
- Max. length: 6.6 miles (10.6 km)
- Max. width: 1.2 miles (1.9 km)
- Surface area: 2,310 acres (9.3 km^{2})
- Average depth: 37 feet (11 m)
- Max. depth: 90 feet (27 m)
- Water volume: 29,630,000,000 US gallons (1.122×10^{11} L)
- Surface elevation: 302.4 feet (92.2 m)
- Website: https://www.njdwsc.com

Wanaque Reservoir is a man-made reservoir located in Wanaque and Ringwood, New Jersey along the Wanaque River. Owned and managed by the North Jersey District Water Supply Commission, the reservoir came into being in 1928 by the construction of the Raymond Dam along the river in Wanaque. Besides the Wanaque River, the reservoir receives water from two diversions: the Pompton Lakes intake, which takes water from the Ramapo River, and the Two Bridges intake, which takes water from the Pompton River. It is the second largest reservoir in New Jersey by volume after Round Valley Reservoir, and the second largest body of water in New Jersey by area after Lake Hopatcong.

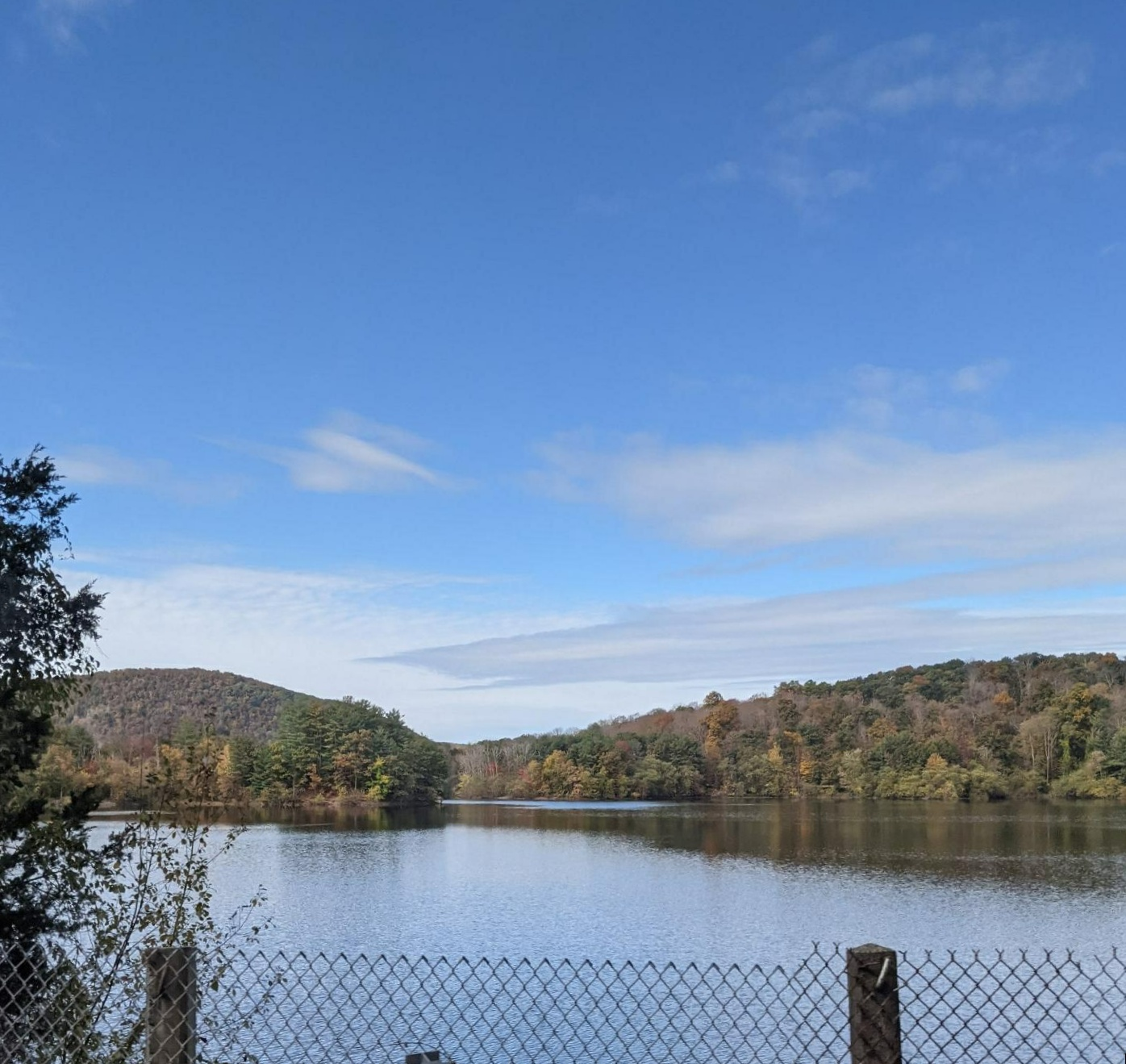
A photo of the Wanaque Reservoir taken from Greenwood Lake Turnpike.

== Construction ==
Construction of the Wanaque Reservoir represented a significant achievement in enabling the supply of potable water to local areas that didn't have safe drinking water sources. The project took quite an extensive time. After eight years of construction, water was delivered to customers for the first time in 1930. Upon completion, the Wanaque Reservoir supplied water to several member municipalities, including Bloomfield, Clifton, Glen Ridge, Kearny, Montclair, Newark, Passaic, and Paterson. A major feature that came with the construction of Wanaque Reservoir was the West Brook Road Bridge. The bridge was constructed to carry the re-located West Brook Road across the Wanaque Reservoir. Construction of the West Brook Road Bridge began in 1926; it was opened to traffic in 1928. The bridge was later rebuilt for safety reasons, and completed in early 2018.
