= Wawayanda Patent =

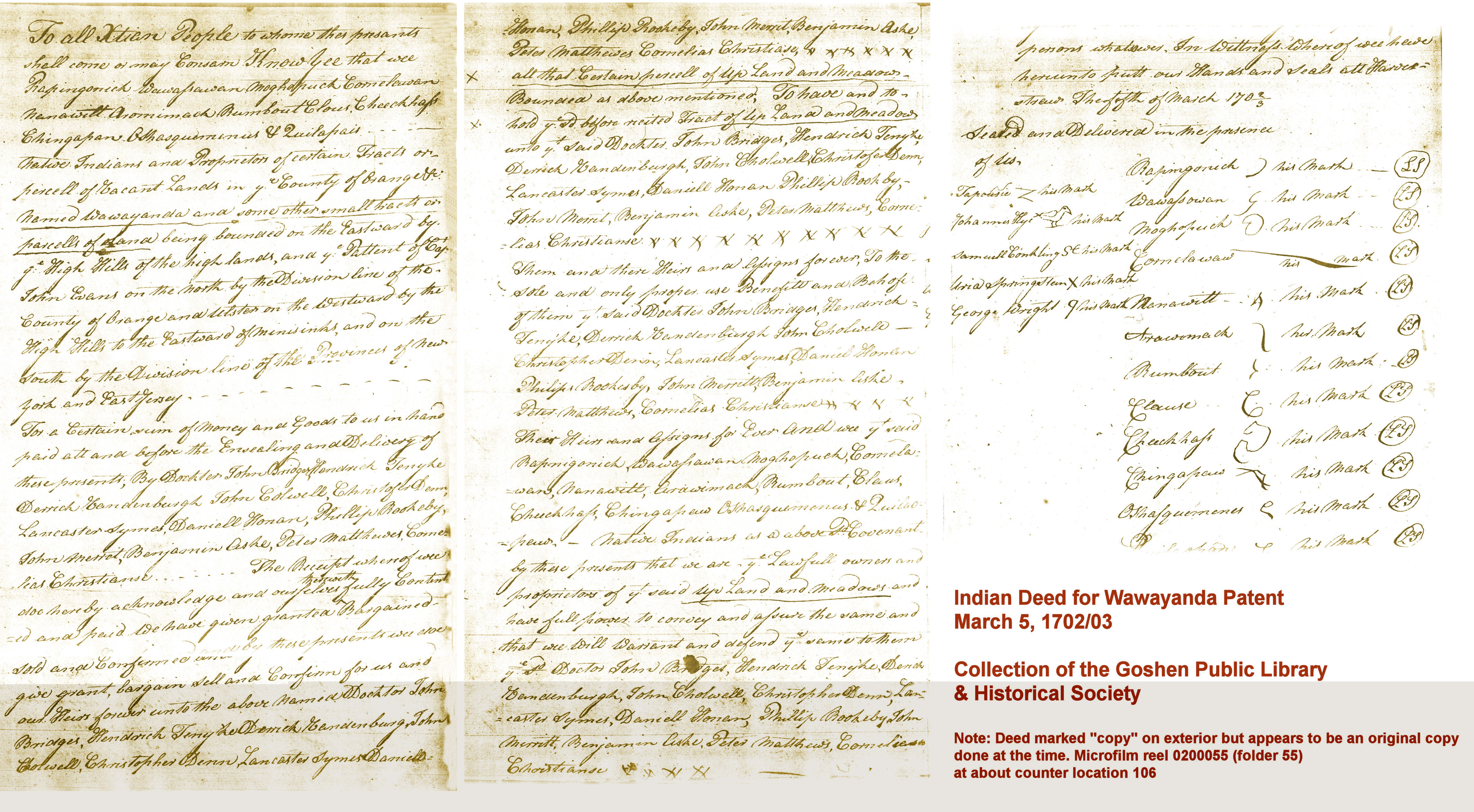
Wawayanda Patent.

The Wawayanda Patent was a land grant in colonial New York. It was granted in 1703, to John Bridges and eleven associates by the governor of New York and New Jersey, Edward Hyde, Lord Cornbury, and was confirmed by Queen Anne. Located in Orange County, New York, it comprised 150,000 acres (610 km^{2}). The lands were bounded on the east by the Highlands of the Hudson, on the north by the county line between Orange and Ulster counties, and on the south by the colonial division line between New York and New Jersey. The patent caused many lawsuits and was unoccupied until 1712.
