= Monksville, New Jersey =

Coordinates: 41.1238°N 74.2998°W

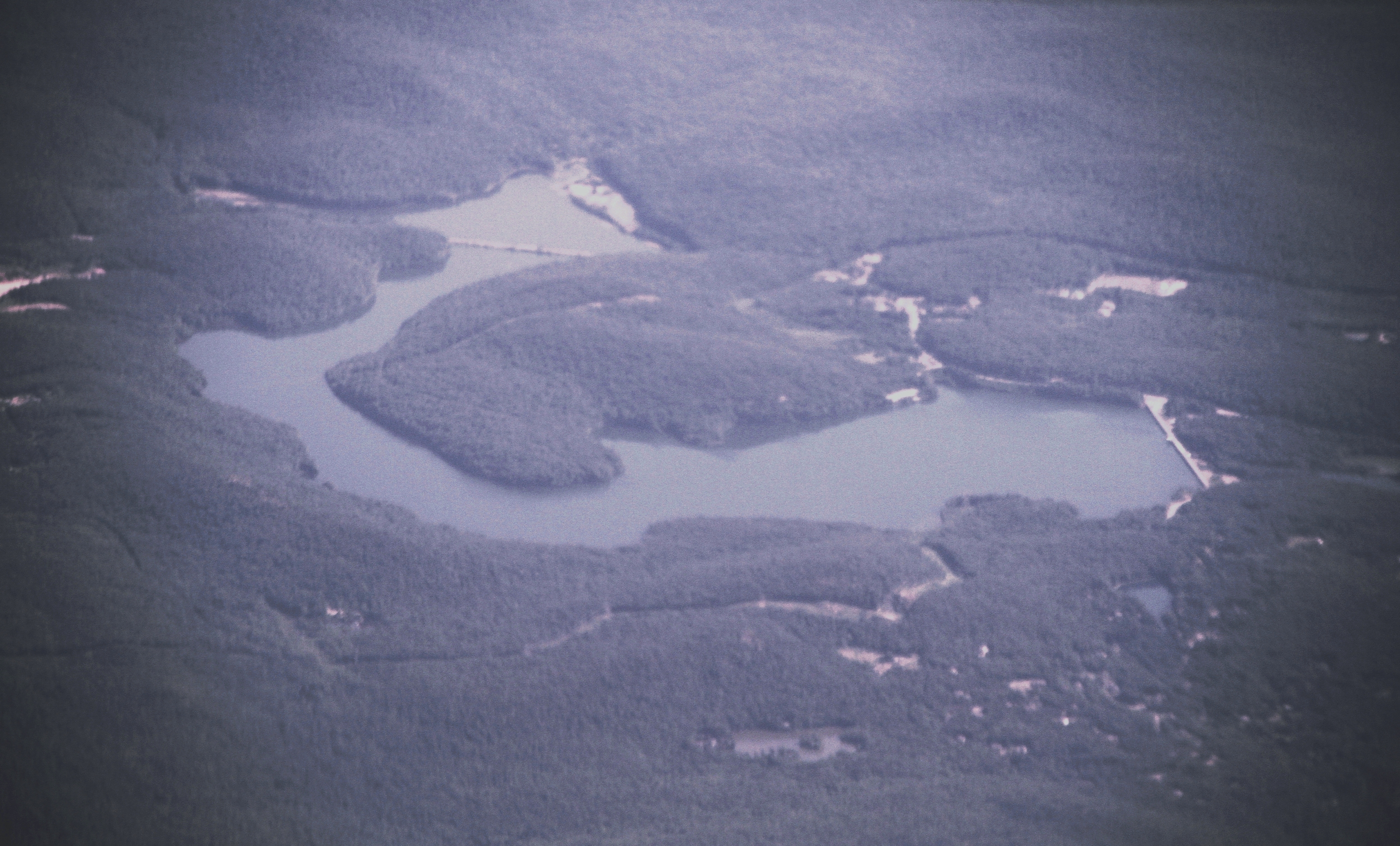
Monksville Reservoir, New Jersey

Monksville or Monks was a small settlement located in West Milford that was demolished and flooded to create the Monksville Reservoir in Passaic County, New Jersey, United States. The village was the home of James Monks, grand-uncle of Charles A. Monks of Passaic County, New Jersey.

The Monks family had come to the United States around the time of the American Revolution and deeded their property in Monksville to the North Jersey Water District Supply Commission in 1928. As part of the construction of the reservoir in the early 1980s, the Monks Cemetery was relocated, including the burial sites of 15 members of the Monks family and another 15 unidentified remains.
