= Abram Hewitt =

American politician and businessman

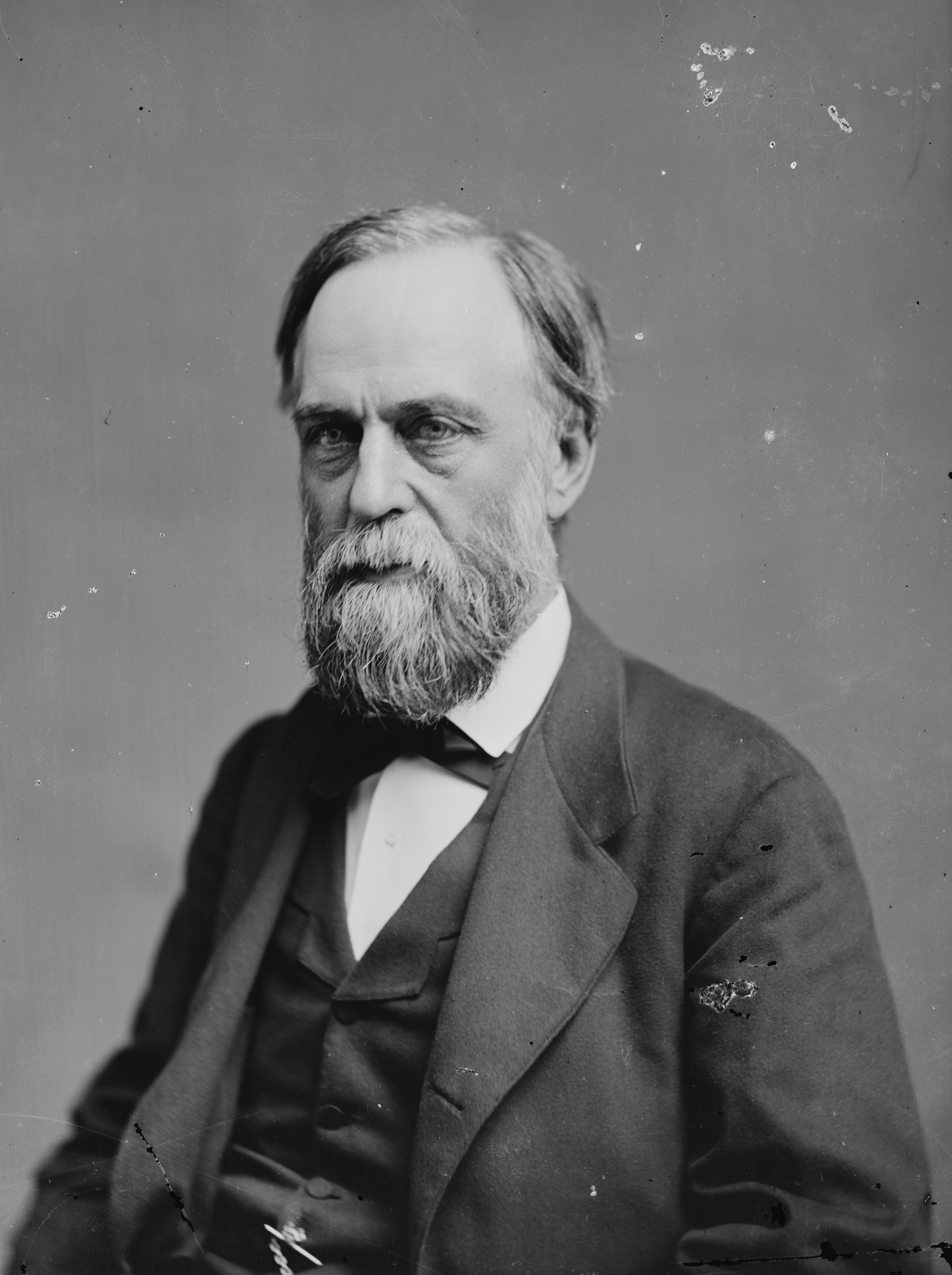
- Portrait by Brady c. 1875–1879

88th Mayor of New York City
- In office January 1, 1887 – December 31, 1888
- Preceded by: William Russell Grace
- Succeeded by: Hugh J. Grant

Member of the U.S. House of Representatives from New York's 10th district
- In office March 4, 1881 – December 30, 1886
- Preceded by: James O'Brien
- Succeeded by: Francis B. Spinola
- In office March 4, 1875 – March 3, 1879
- Preceded by: Fernando Wood
- Succeeded by: James O'Brien

Chairman of the Democratic National Committee
- In office 1876–1877
- Preceded by: Augustus Schell
- Succeeded by: William H. Barnum

Personal details
- Born: Abram Stevens Hewitt; July 31, 1822 Haverstraw, New York, U.S.
- Died: January 18, 1903 (aged 80) New York City, New York, U.S.
- Resting place: Green-Wood Cemetery, Brooklyn
- Party: Democratic
- Education: Columbia College

Abram Stevens Hewitt (July 31, 1822 – January 18, 1903) was an American politician, educator, ironmaking industrialist, and lawyer who was mayor of New York City for two years from 1887 to 1888. He also twice served as a U.S. Congressman from New York's 10th congressional district and chaired the Democratic National Committee from 1876 to 1877.

The son-in-law of the industrialist and philanthropist Peter Cooper, Hewitt is best known for his work with the Cooper Union, which he aided Cooper in founding in 1859, and for planning the financing and construction of the first line of what eventually developed into the New York City Subway, for which he is considered the "Father of the New York City Subway System".

== Early life ==
Hewitt was born in Haverstraw, New York. His mother, Ann Gurnee, was of French Huguenot descent, while his father, John Hewitt, was from Staffordshire in England and had emigrated to the U.S. in 1796 to work on a steam engine to power a water plant in Philadelphia.

Hewitt attended Columbia College on a scholarship and was a member of the Philolexian Society.. After graduating from the college in 1842, he taught mathematics there, and became a lawyer several years later.

From 1843 to 1844, Hewitt traveled to Europe with his student, Edward Cooper, the son of industrialist entrepreneur Peter Cooper, and another future New York City mayor. During their return voyage, the pair were shipwrecked together. After this, Hewitt became "virtually a member of the Cooper family", and in 1855 married Edward's sister, Sarah Amelia.

== Corporate career ==
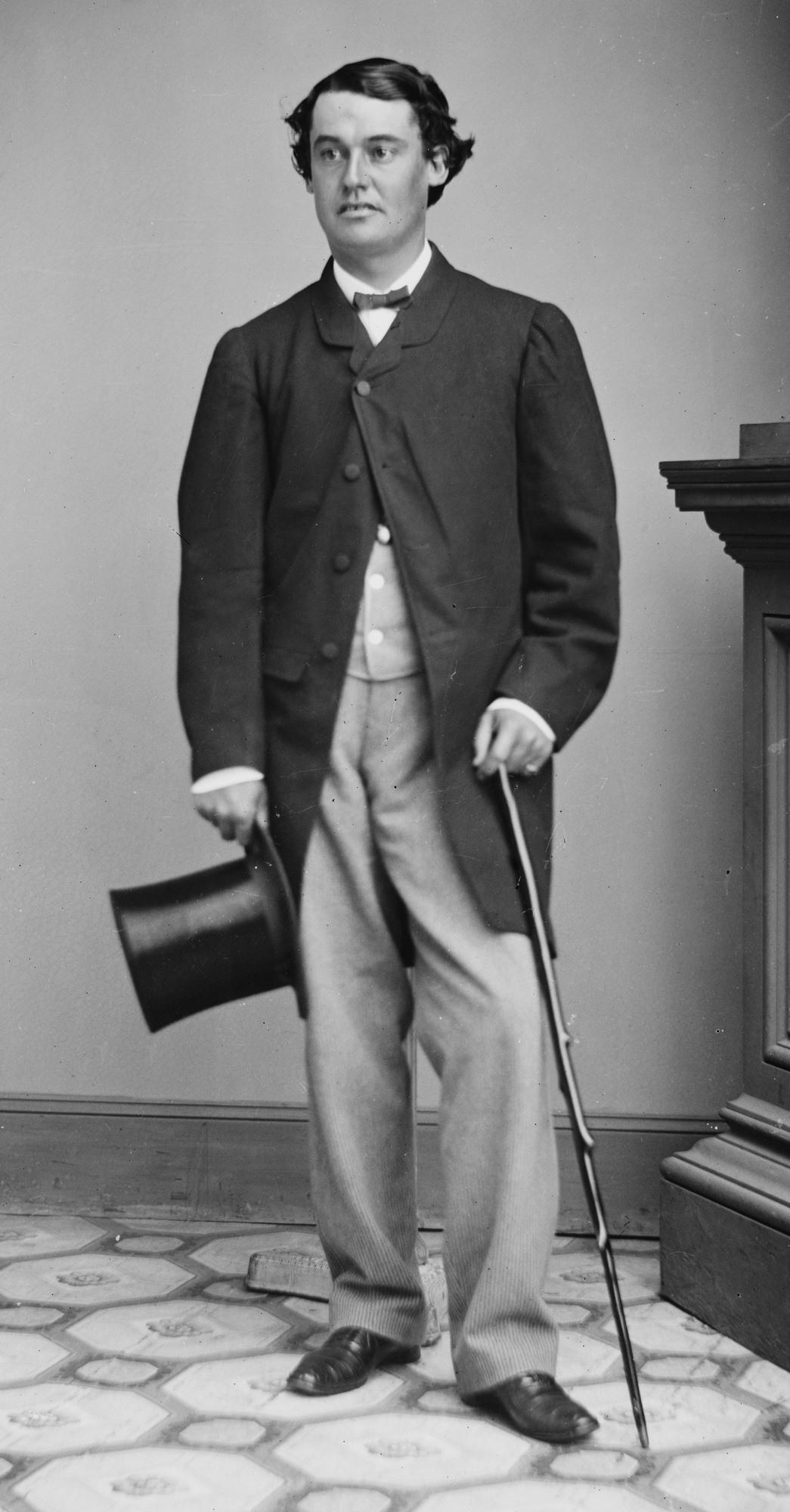
Hewitt c. 1855–1865

In 1845, financed by Peter Cooper, Hewitt and Edward Cooper started an iron mill in Trenton, New Jersey, the Trenton Iron Company, where, in 1854, they produced the first structural wrought iron beams, as well as developing other innovative products. Hewitt's younger brother, Charles, was a manager at the iron mill. Hewitt also invested in other companies, in many case serving on their boards.

Hewitt supervised the construction of the Cooper Union, Peter Cooper's free educational institution, and chaired its board of trustees until 1903.

== Political career ==
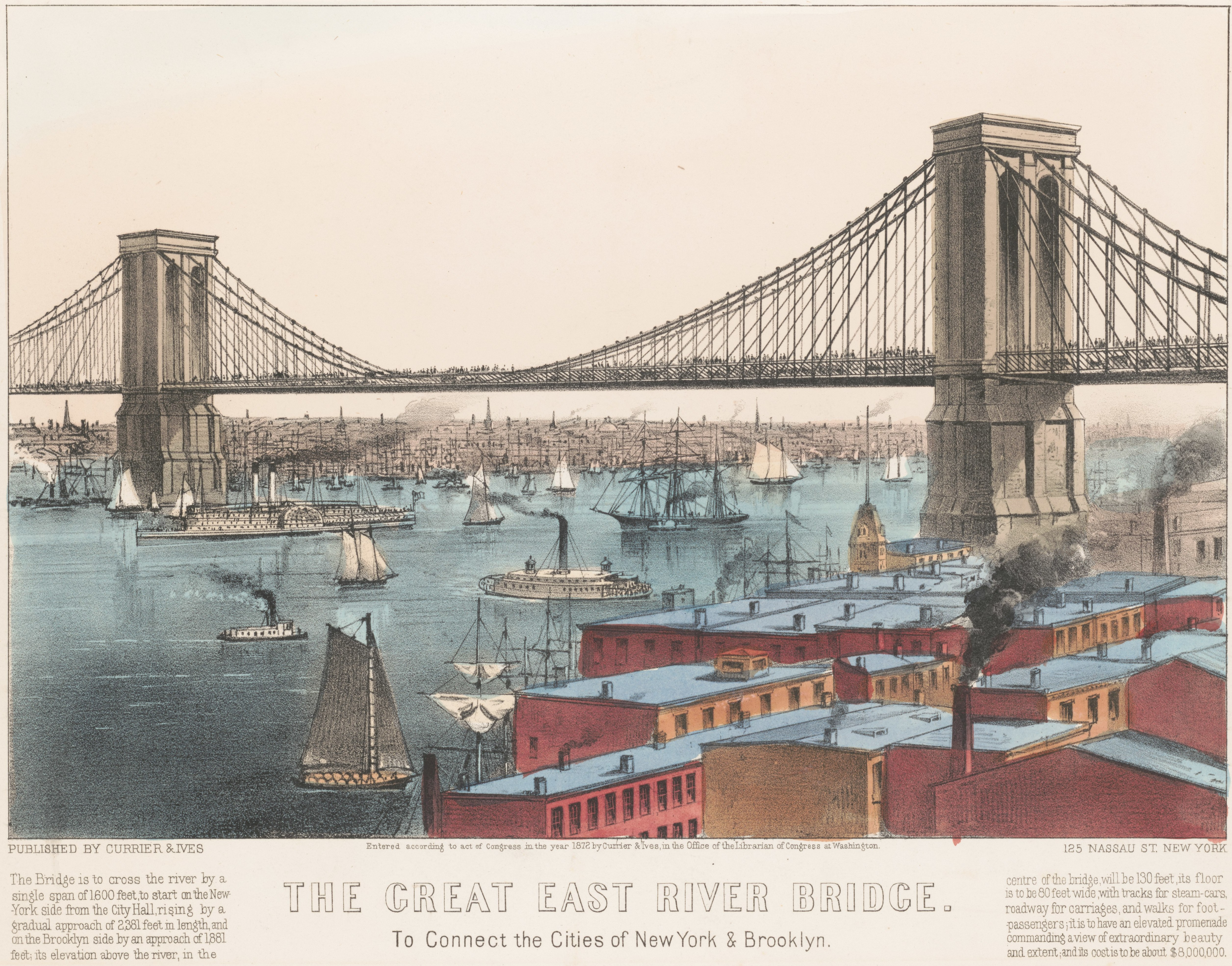
Artists' conception, by Currier and Ives, of the bridge while construction was underway, 1872

In 1871, inspired by reformer Samuel J. Tilden, Cooper prominently campaigned to remove the corrupt "Tweed Ring", led by William M. "Boss" Tweed, from control of Tammany Hall, and to reorganize the Democratic Party in New York, which Tweed controlled for years through his political machine.

=== Congress ===
Hewitt first ventured into electoral politics in 1874, when he won a seat in the U.S. House of Representatives, where he initially served two terms representing New York's 10th congressional district, from March 4, 1875, to March 3, 1879. During his first stint in Congress, he was made head of the Democratic National Committee in 1876, when Tilden ran unsuccessfully for President.

After defeating James O'Brien, his successor in Congress who was a staunch opponent of Tammany Hall, for the Democratic nomination in the 10th district during the 1880 elections, Hewitt regained his old seat and once again served in the U.S. House from 4 March 1881 to 30 December 1886. Hewitt's most famous speech was made at the opening of the Brooklyn Bridge between Manhattan and Brooklyn in 1883.

=== Mayor of New York City ===
"Age Before Beauty!" a political cartoon published in Puck depicting Hewitt's victory over Theodore Roosevelt, November 10, 1886

Hewitt was elected mayor of New York City in 1886. He defeated the labor candidate Henry George as well as the Republican candidate Theodore Roosevelt. Hewitt's election campaign had the support of Tammany Hall. The endorsement was formal and included organizational muscle.

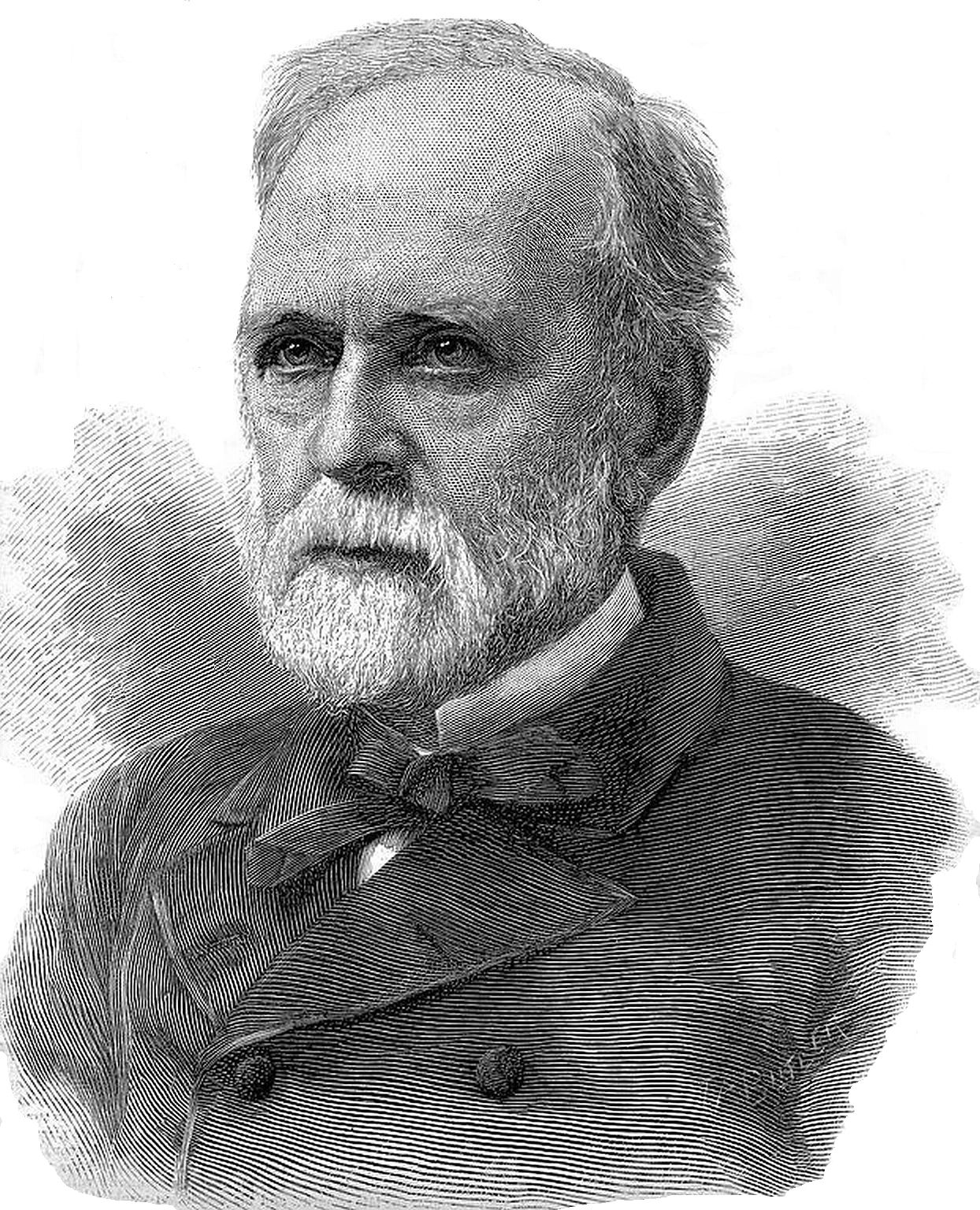
Engraving published in Harper's Weekly, October 20, 1888

Hewitt refused to review the Saint Patrick's Day parade, a decision that alienated much of the Democratic Party's Irish–American base in the city. Hewitt also refused to allow Tammany the control of patronage they wanted, and Croker saw to it that Hewitt was not nominated for a second term.

Hewitt was considered a defender of sound financial management. He is quoted as saying "Unnecessary taxation is unjust taxation". Hewitt also upheld the civil service reform in the United States. He oversaw the passage of the Rapid Transit Act of 1894, which would provide public funding for the construction of the first New York City Subway line.

A 1993 survey of historians, political scientists and urban experts conducted by Melvin G. Holli of the University of Illinois at Chicago ranked Hewitt as the twenty-sixth-best American big-city mayor to have served between the years 1820 and 1993.

== Entrepreneurial career ==
Hewitt had many investments in natural resources, including considerable holdings in West Virginia, where William Nelson Page (1854–1932) was one of his managers. He was also an associate of Henry Huttleston Rogers (1840–1909), a financier and industrialist who was a key man in the Standard Oil Trust, and a major developer of natural resources.

One of Hewitt's investments handled by Rogers and Page was the Loup Creek Estate in Fayette County, West Virginia. The Deepwater Railway was a subsidiary initially formed by the Loup Creek investors to ship bituminous coal from coal mines on their land a short distance to the main line of the Chesapeake and Ohio Railway (C&O) along the Kanawha River. After rate disputes, the short line railroad was eventually expanded to extend all the way into Virginia and across that state to a new coal pier at Sewell's Point on Hampton Roads. It was renamed the Virginian Railway.

In 1890 Hewitt partnered with Edward Cooper and Hamilton McKown Twombly in forming the American Sulphur Company, which then entered into a 50/50 agreement with Herman Frasch and his partners to form the Union Sulphur Company.

== Philanthropy ==
As philanthropist Hewitt was interested in education. Columbia University gave him the degree of LL.D. in 1887, and he was the president of its alumni association in 1883, and a trustee from 1901 until his death.

In 1876, he was elected president of the American Institute of Mining Engineers, and was a founder and trustee of the Carnegie Institution of Science. He was also a trustee of Barnard College and of the American Museum of Natural History.

== Death and family ==
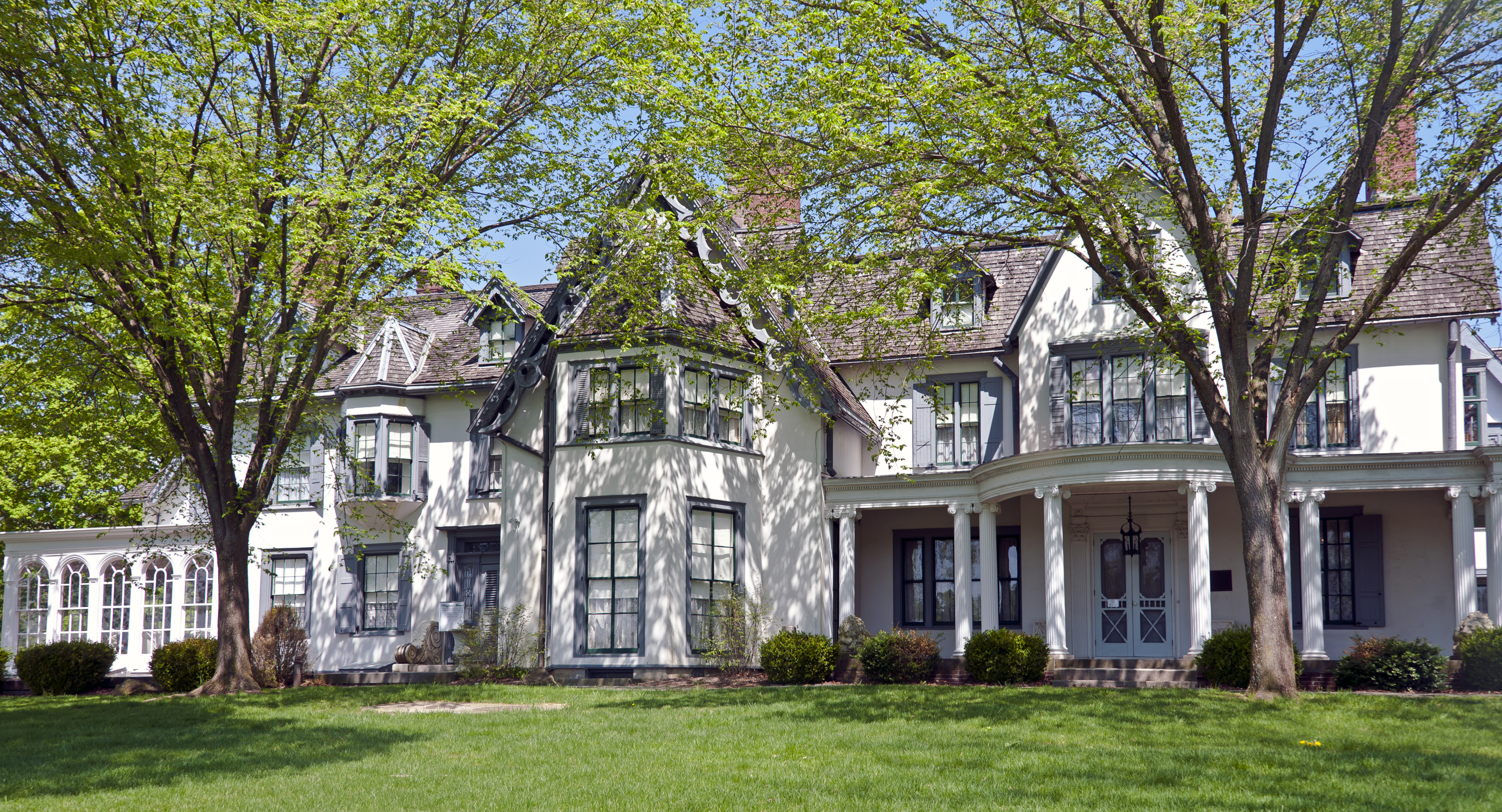
Ringwood Manor

Abram Hewitt died at his New York City home on January 18, 1903, and was interred at Green-Wood Cemetery. His last words, after he took his oxygen tube from his mouth, were "And now, I am officially dead."

Hewitt's daughters, Amy, Eleanor, and Sarah Hewitt, built a decorative arts collection that was for years exhibited at the Cooper Union and later became the core collection of the Cooper-Hewitt National Design Museum. His son, Peter Cooper Hewitt (1861–1921), was a successful inventor, while another son, Edward Ringwood Hewitt (1865–1957), was also an inventor, a chemist and an early expert on fly-fishing. He published Telling on the Trout, among other books.

Hewitt's youngest son, Erskine Hewitt (1871–1938), was also a lawyer and philanthropist in New York City. He donated Ringwood Manor to the State of New Jersey in 1936. On February 18, 1909, Erskine Hewitt was named a director of the newly formed National Reserve Bank of the City of New York. On March 2, 1909, Hewitt was elected chairman.

== Legacy ==
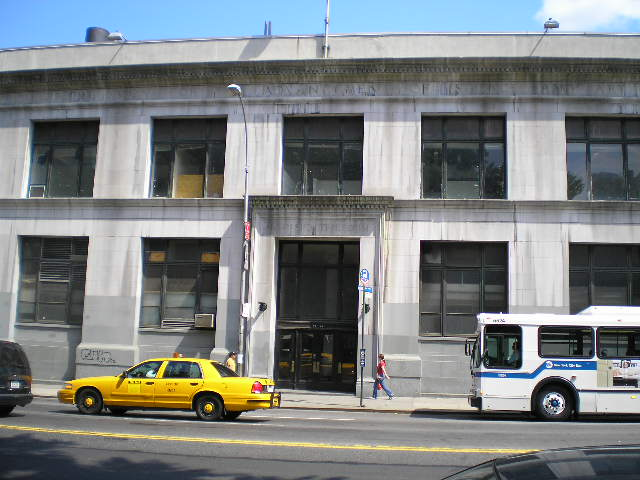
Abram Hewitt Memorial Building of Cooper Union in Cooper Square, Manhattan

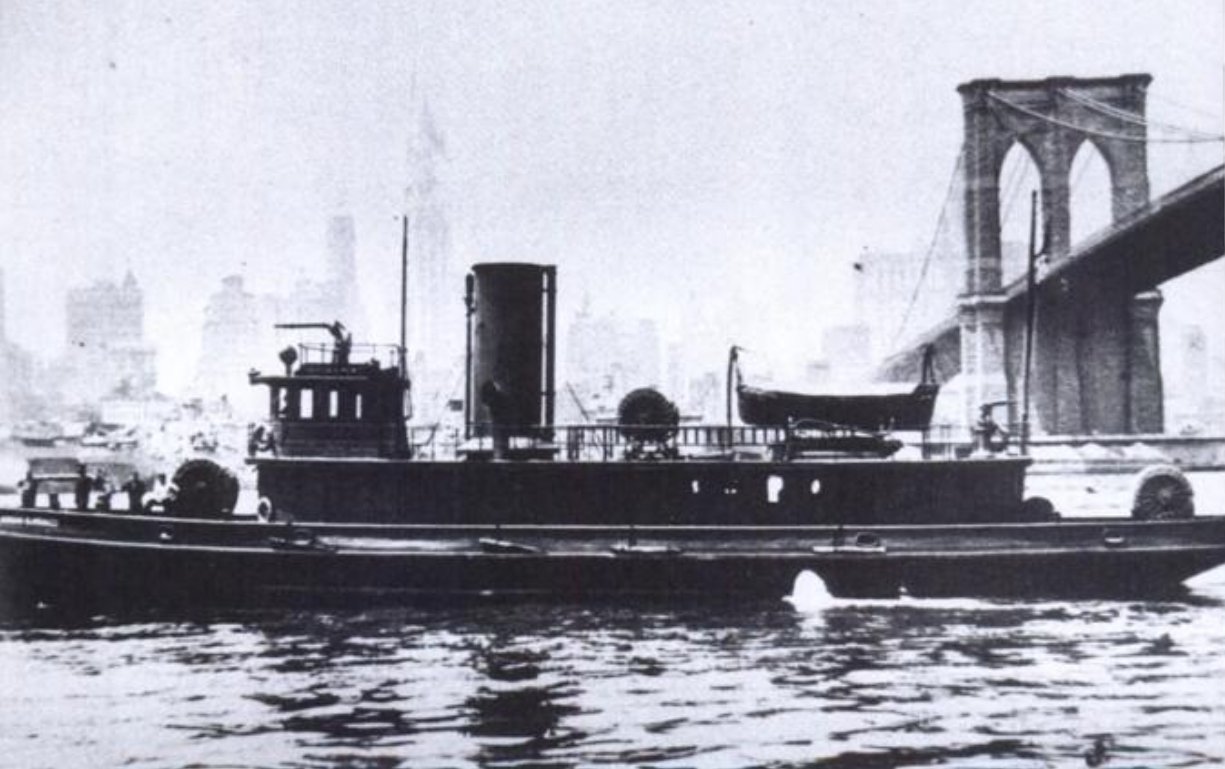
The fireboat Abram S. Hewitt in 1903

- One of Cooper Union's academic buildings was named in his honor. It was demolished and replaced by 41 Cooper Square in 2007. An historic twenty-foot column in the Hewitt Building designed by Stanford White was transported—appropriately enough—to its former home at the Green-Wood Cemetery in Brooklyn, New York, where it now stands on Abram S. Hewitt's memorial plot.
- A New York City fireboat, Abram S. Hewitt, which served from 1903 until 1958 was named in his honor. The fireboat was eventually scrapped, and its remains may be found at the Witte Marine Scrapyard in Rossville, Staten Island.
- There is a life-sized white marble statue of Hewitt in the Great Hall of the Chamber of Commerce of the State of New York in Albany, New York.
- The historic village of Hewitt, New Jersey, located within the Township of West Milford, is preserved within Long Pond Ironworks State Park. The village contains the ruins of the iron smelting furnaces operated by Cooper and Hewitt.
- Ringwood Manor in Ringwood, New Jersey, the Hewitt family's summer estate from 1857 to the 1930s, is preserved as the centerpiece of New Jersey's Ringwood State Park.
- Abram Stevens Hewitt School (P.S. 130) in the Bronx, New York, was named for him.
- Hewitt Hall of Barnard College at Columbia University is named for him.
- Abram S. Hewitt State Forest along the Appalachian Trail was named in his honor.

U.S. House of Representatives
Preceded by Fernando Wood	Member of the U.S. House of Representatives from New York's 10th congressional district 1875-03-04 – 1879-03-03	Succeeded by James O'Brien
Preceded by James O'Brien	Member of the U.S. House of Representatives from New York's 10th congressional district 1881-03-04 – 1886-12-30	Succeeded by Francis B. Spinola
Political offices
Preceded by William R. Grace	Mayor of New York City; 1887–1888	Succeeded by Hugh J. Grant
Business positions
Preceded by Edward Cooper	President of Cooper Union; 1898–1903	Succeeded by John E. Parsons
