= Ringwood Manor =

- U.S. National Register of Historic Places
- U.S. National Historic Landmark District
- New Jersey Register of Historic Places
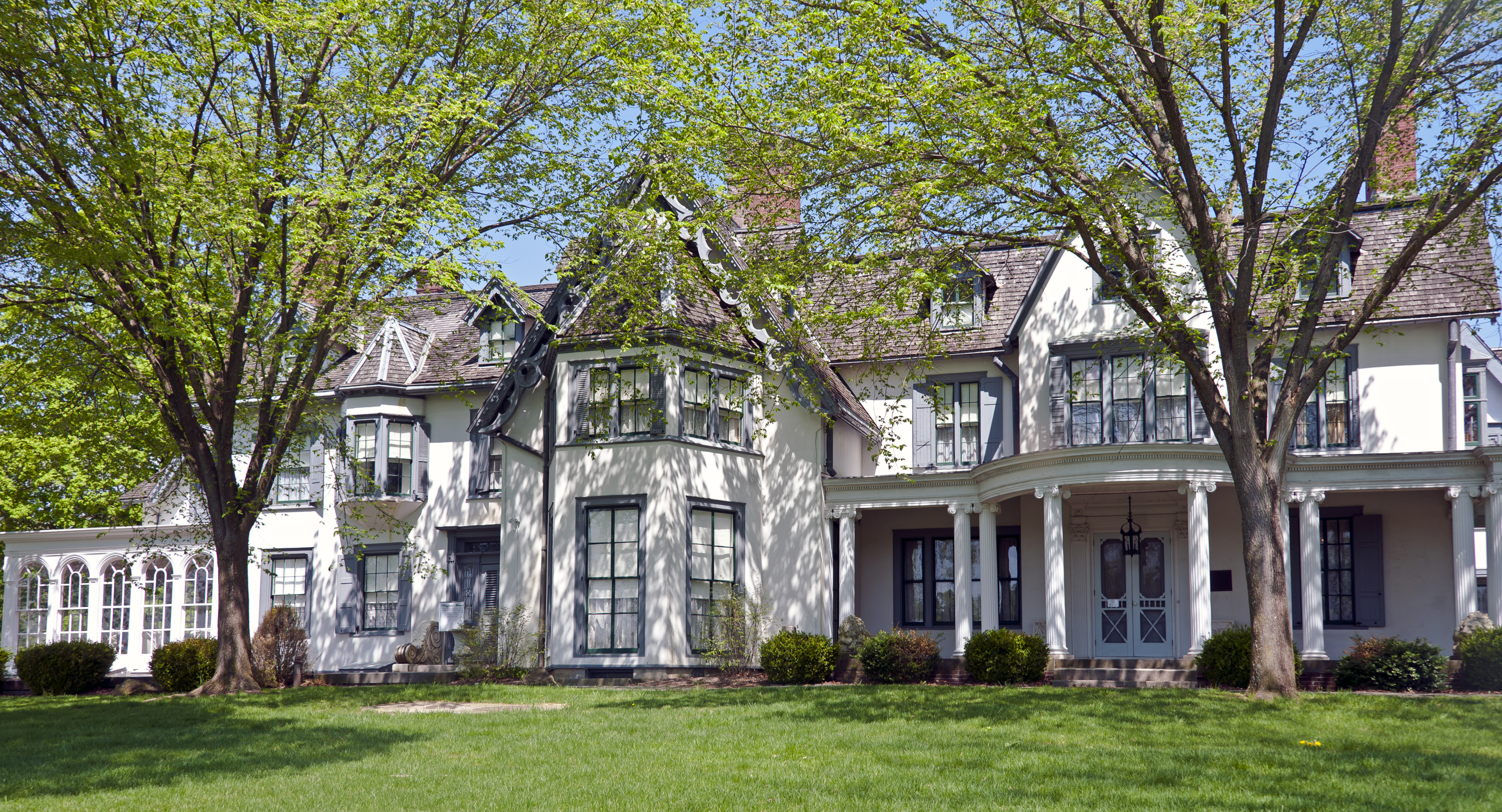
- Front elevation, 2015

- Location within Passaic County, New Jersey Location within New Jersey Location within the United States
- Location: 3 mi. E of Hewitt, Ringwood Manor State Park, Ringwood, New Jersey
- Coordinates: 41°8′40″N 74°15′10″W
- Area: 724 acres (293 ha)
- Built: 1739
- NRHP reference No.: 66000471
- NJRHP No.: 2403

Significant dates
- Added to NRHP: November 13, 1966
- Designated NHLD: November 13, 1966
- Designated NJRHP: May 27, 1971

Ringwood Manor, located in Passaic County, New Jersey, was the site of an ironworks and home to a number of well-known ironmasters from the 1740s to the late 19th century. The current manor house was not built until 1807.

== History ==
Scottish engineer Robert Erskine was hired in 1771 to manage the ironmaking operations at Ringwood. During the American Revolutionary War, after designing a cheval-de-frise for the Hudson River in 1776, he was appointed by General George Washington as his first Geographer and Surveyor General of the Continental Army. Erskine drew more than 275 maps of the northern sector. He also kept Ringwood iron operating, as the manufacture was important to supplying the Continental war effort. It was used in manufacturing links for the Hudson River Chain, a defensive device installed across the river north of West Point, and for tools and hardware for the army.

In the early 19th century, Martin J. Ryerson purchased the historic ironworks. He began building the present Manor House in 1807 while still operating the iron mines and forges on the property. For the next half century, Ryerson ran five forge-furnace complexes in three counties from his headquarters at Ringwood. He made shot for the War of 1812. He also negotiated land and water rights with the Morris Canal Company for expansion of Long Pond (Greenwood Lake) and construction of the Pompton Feeder on the Morris Canal. The Ryerson Steel Company is still operating today.

New York's Peter Cooper, an inventor and industrialist purchased Ringwood Manor in 1854. One of the Manor's last owners was Cooper's son-in-law, Abram S. Hewitt, ironmaster, educator, lawyer, U.S. Congressman, and mayor of New York City.

A 479-acre (194 ha) area including the manor house was declared a National Historic Landmark District in 1966. The Ringwood Manor NHL area is the entire 479-acre Ringwood Manor State Park. One outbuilding houses a working coal-fired, bellows-fed forge. It was rebuilt in the 1960s and has since been briefly operated from time to time by volunteer blacksmiths.

Ringwood Manor is included within the larger Ringwood State Park, which also includes Skylands Manor and a recreational area. It is located three miles (5 km) east of Hewitt, New Jersey, off Route 23.

== Gallery ==
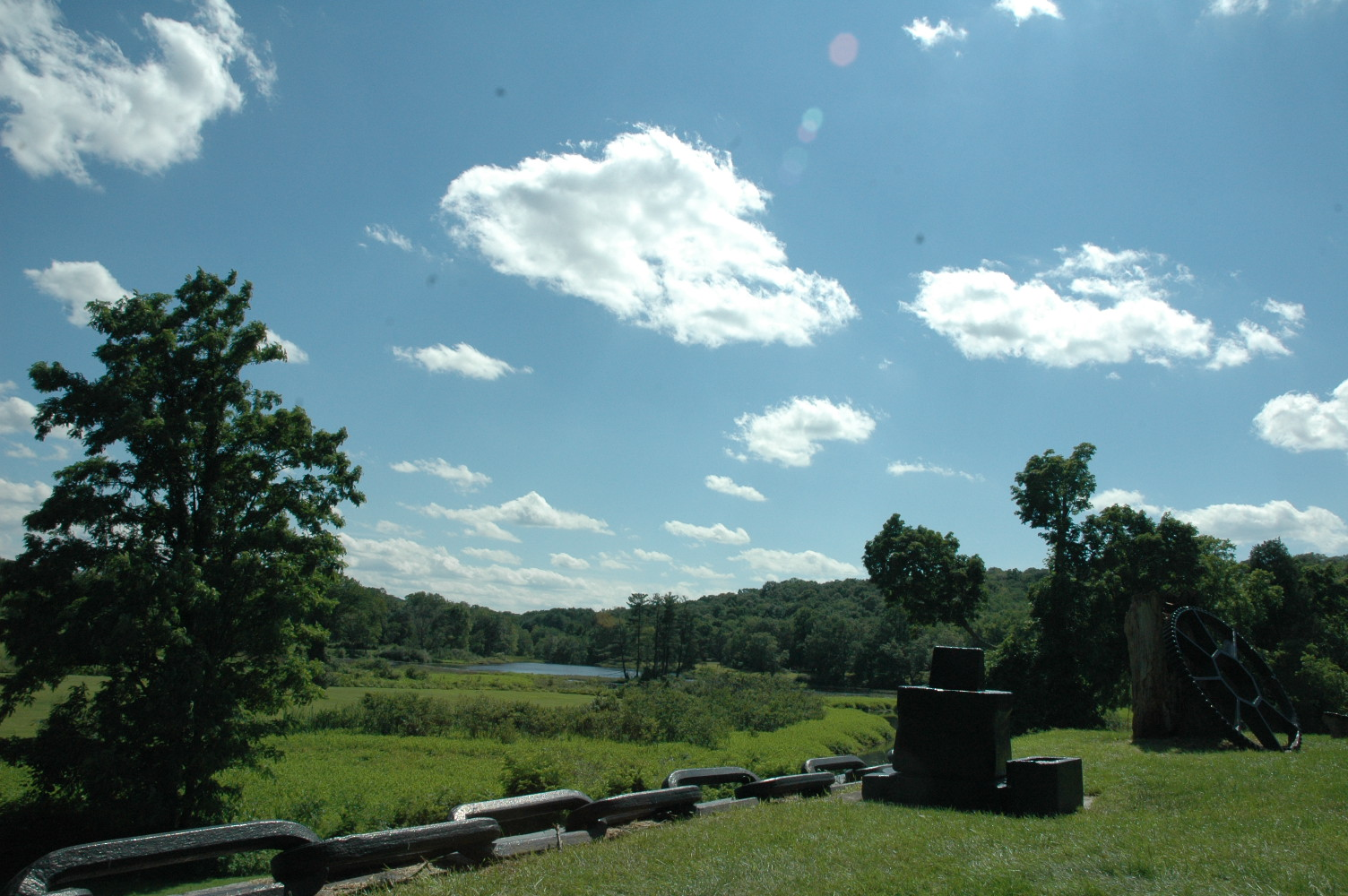
View of the area surrounding the Ringwood Manor

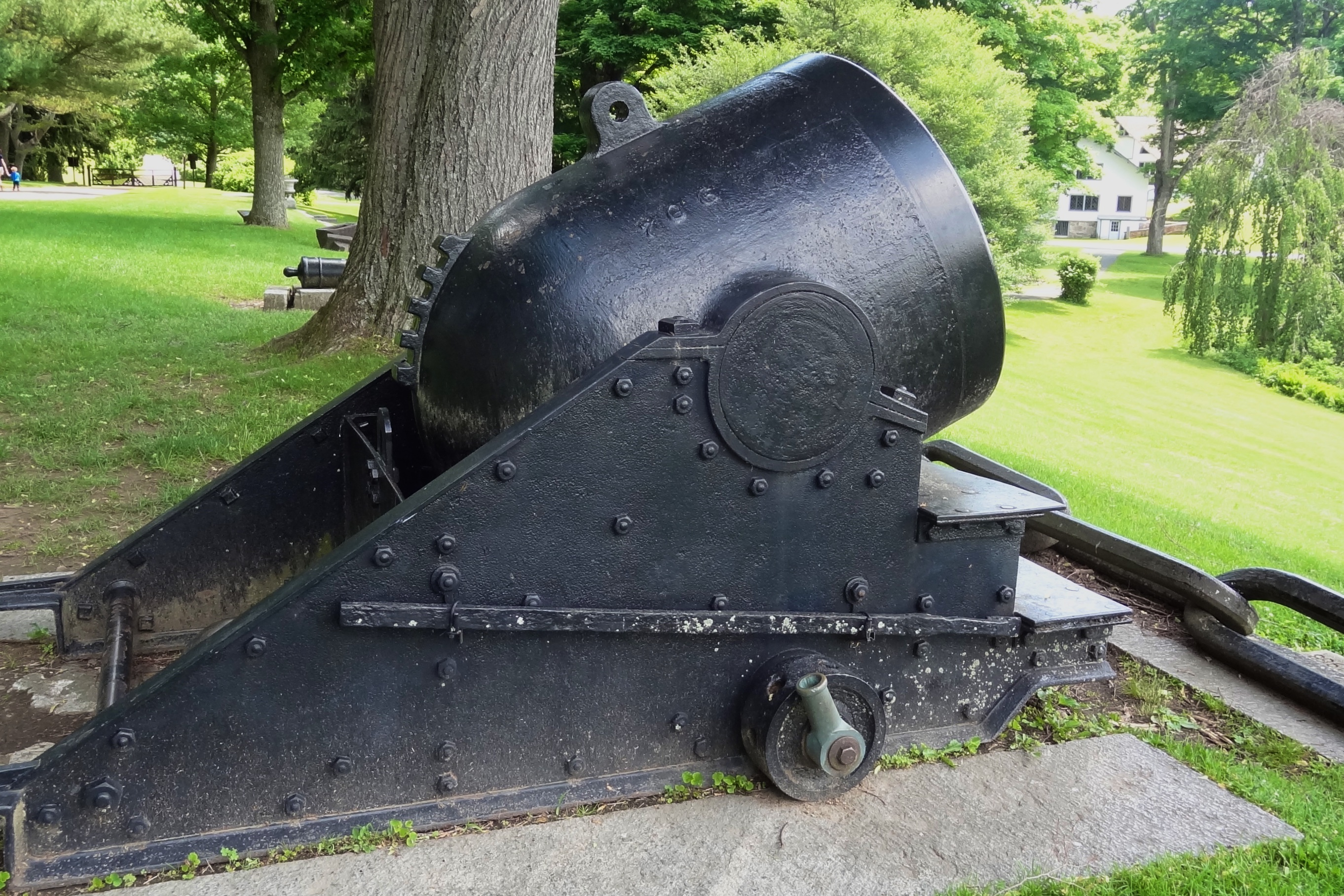
Civil War mortar

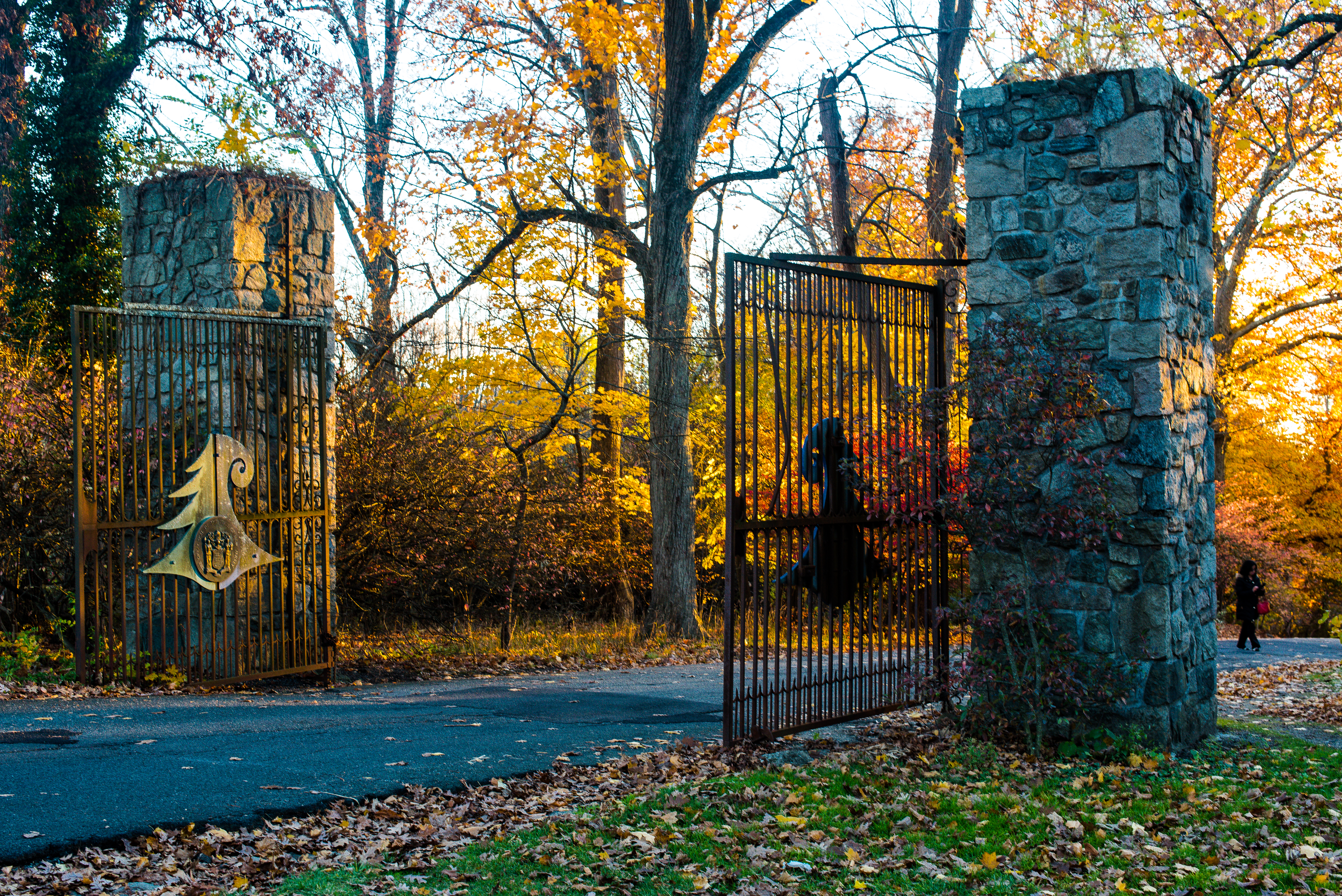
Entrance gate

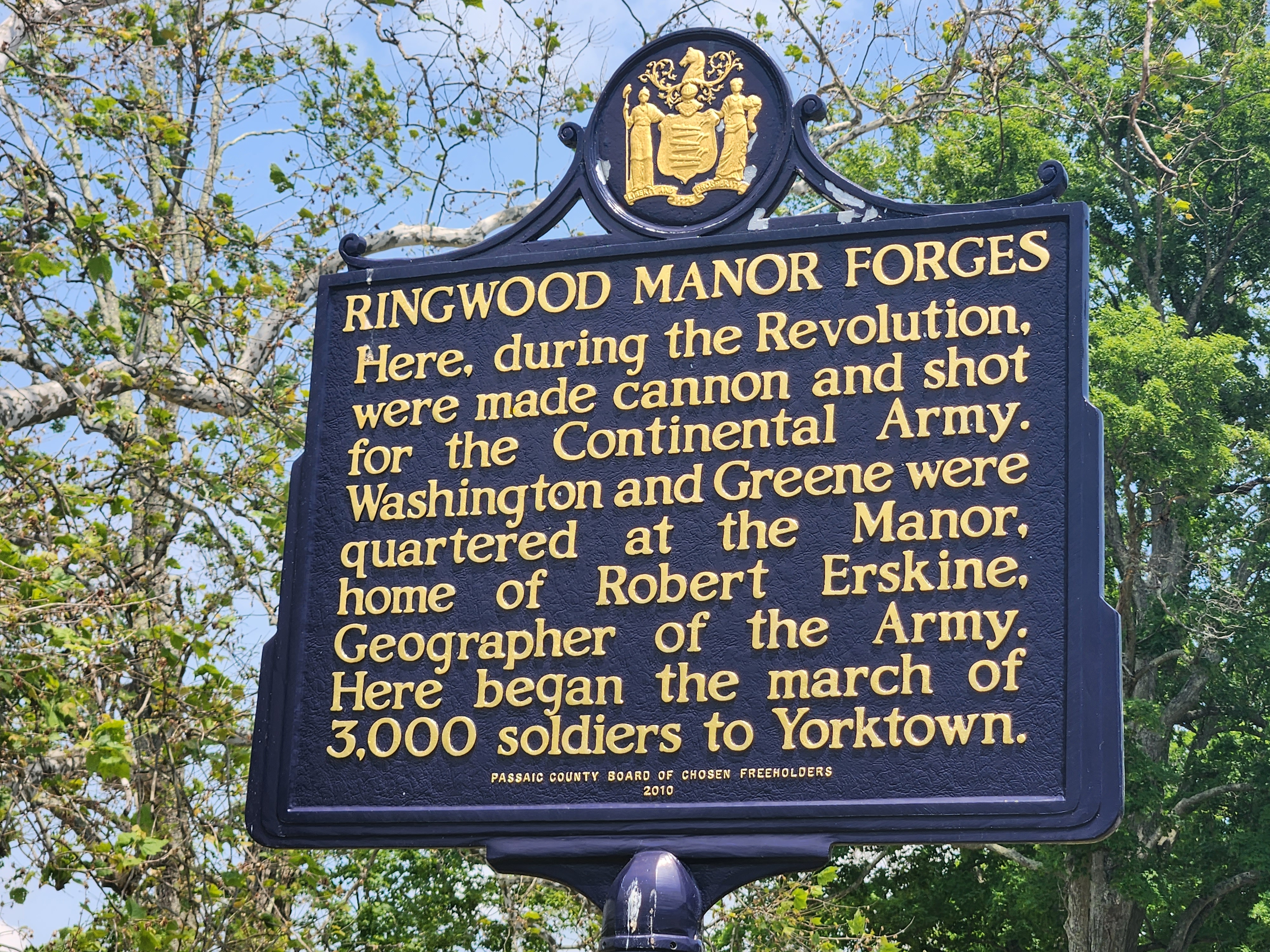
Ringwood Forges H.M.

== See also ==
- Ringwood State Park
- List of museums in New Jersey
- List of National Historic Landmarks in New Jersey
