= Ringwood State Park =

State park in New Jersey, United States

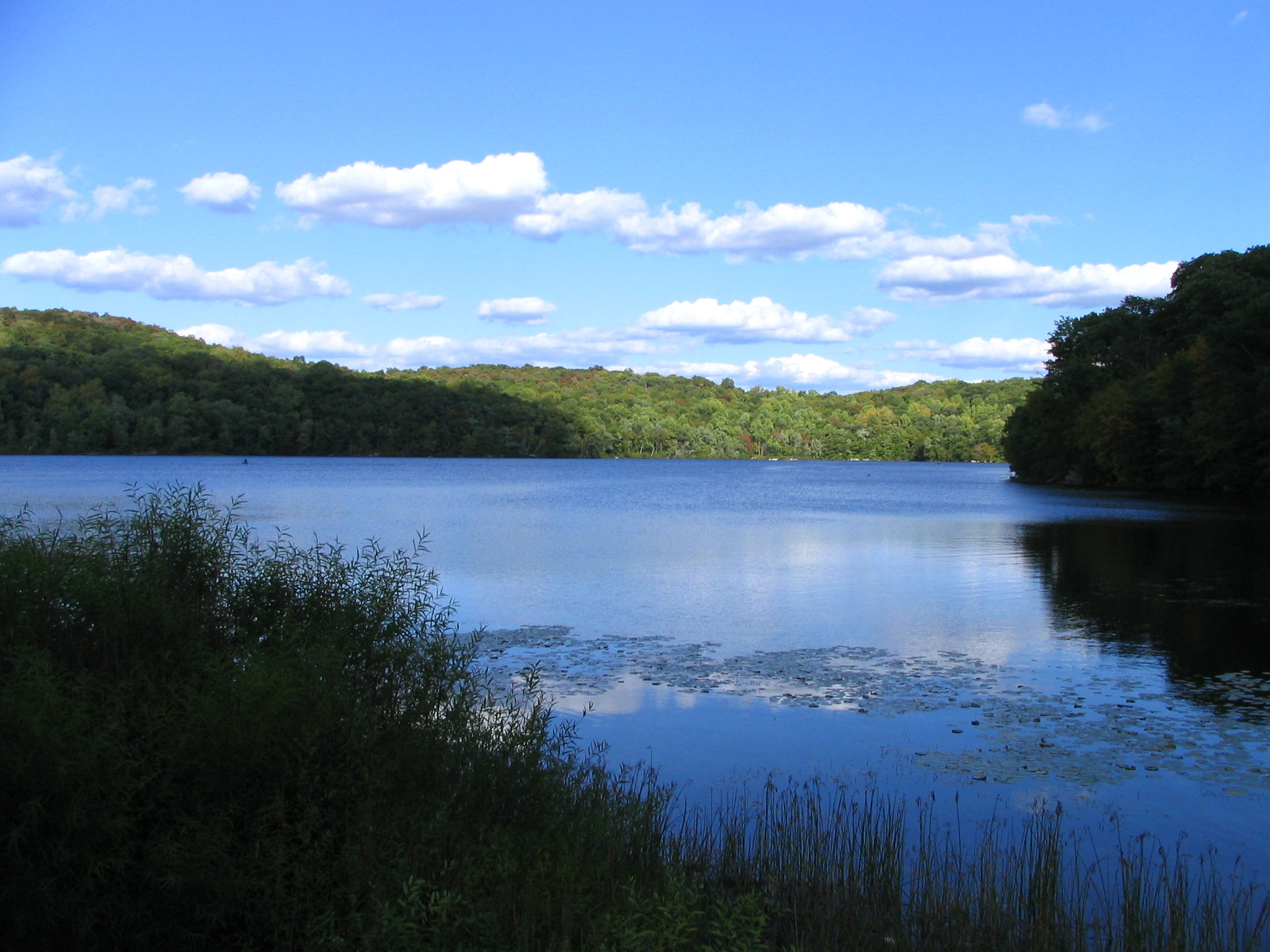
- Shepherd Lake Recreation Area

- Location within New Jersey Location within the United States
- Location: Ringwood
- Coordinates: 41°08′11″N 74°15′22″W
- Area: 4,444-acre (17.98 km^{2})
- Created: 1966
- Operator: New Jersey Division of Parks and Forestry
- Website: Official website

Ringwood State Park is a 4,444 acres (17.98 km^{2}) state park in Passaic County in northeastern New Jersey, USA. The Park is located in the heart of the Ramapo Mountains in Ringwood. Its forests are part of the Northeastern coastal forests ecoregion.

It contains the New Jersey Botanical Garden at Skylands (includes Skylands Manor), the historic Ringwood Manor and the Shepherd Lake Recreation Area. The park is operated and maintained by the New Jersey Division of Parks and Forestry.

== Skylands Manor and Botanical Gardens ==
A forty-four-room English Jacobean mansion, the building was designed in the 1920s by John Russell Pope for Clarence McKensie Lewis, a wealthy stockbroker and civil engineer. The gardens were established by lawyer Francis Lynde Stetson, who owned Skylands from 1891 to 1922. The 96-acre (390,000 m^{2}) botanical garden contains a variety of plants, evergreens and deciduous trees and shrubs. The landscaping includes a crabapple vista, terraced gardens, perennial and annual gardens and woodland paths. The extensive gardens offer views of the Ramapo Mountains. Skylands Manor is open for tours one Sunday per month March through November.

== Ringwood Manor ==
Was home to a number of well-known ironmasters from the 1740s to the late 19th century. During the American Revolution, Robert Erskine managed ironmaking operations from Ringwood, and became George Washington's first geographer and Surveyor-General, producing maps for the Continental Army; Washington visited the Manor House several times. Ringwood iron was used in the famous Hudson River Chain, and for tools and hardware for the army. One of the Manor's last owners was Abram S. Hewitt, ironmaster, educator, lawyer, U.S. Congressman, and mayor of New York City. The Manor is part of a National Historic Landmark District and is open for tours from Wednesday through Sunday year round from 10 am to 3 pm.

== Shepherd Lake Recreation Area ==
Centered on 74-acre (300,000 m^{2}), spring-fed Shepherd Lake. Boating (electric motors only) and fishing are permitted, boat rentals are available, but no swimming is allowed. A network of trails maintained by the New York - New Jersey Trail Conference surrounds the lake; some are multi-use trails, and may be used for hiking, horseback riding, mountain biking, cross country skiing or snowmobiling. A 7.5-mile (12.1 km) mountain bike loop, maintained by the Jersey Off Road Bicycling Association, is especially popular.

Shepherd Lake also operated as a ski area during the 1960s and included a rope tow and double chairlift. Hiking to the top of the hill will reveal the top station and bullwheel of the chairlift. The old ski slope is now mostly overgrown. Sledding used to be permitted on the lower half but is no longer allowed due to the safety hazard of sledding into Shepherd Lake. Sledding is still available in the park on two hills in the Ringwood Manor section.

== Gallery ==
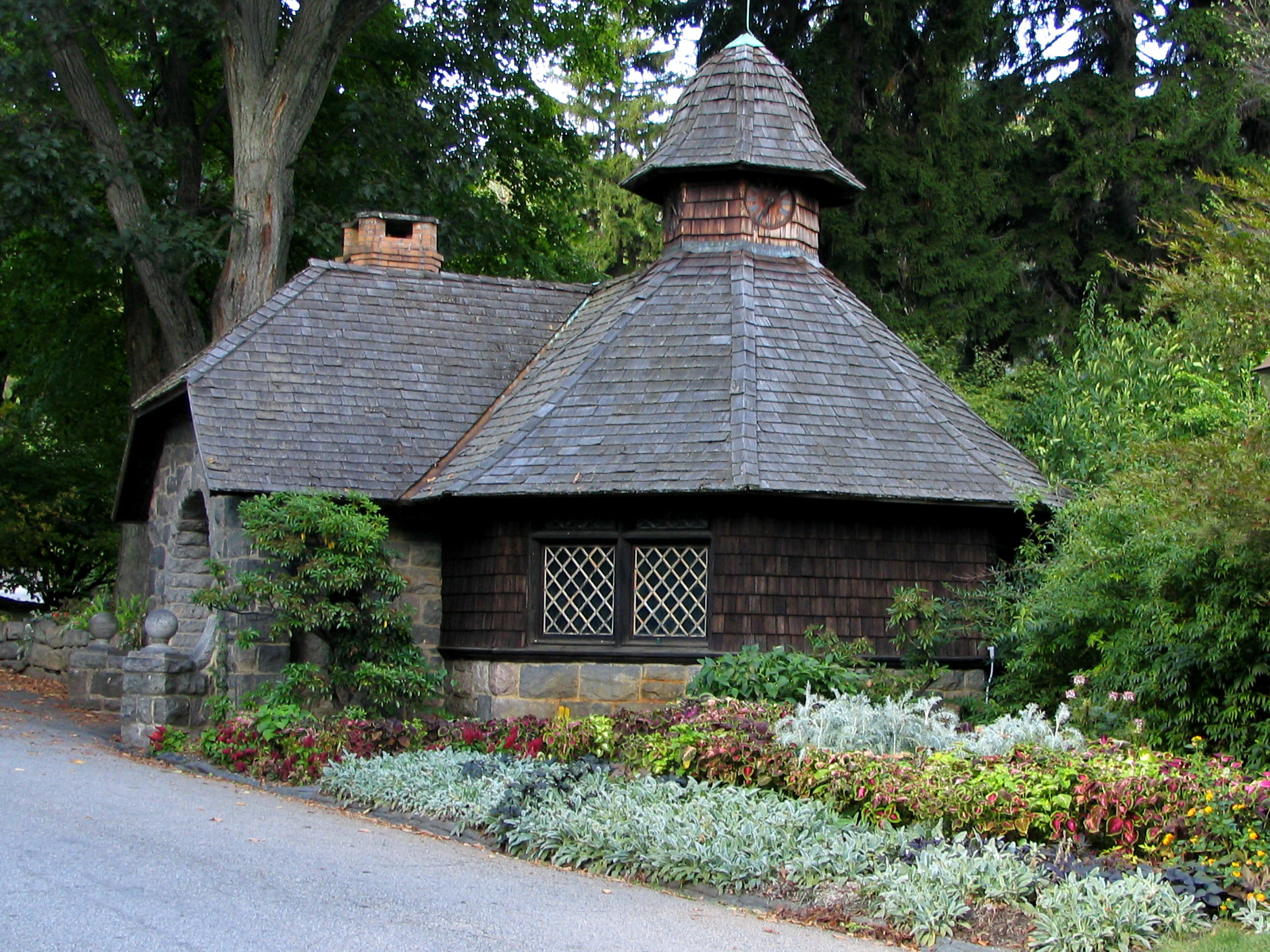
A former pumphouse at Skylands Manor

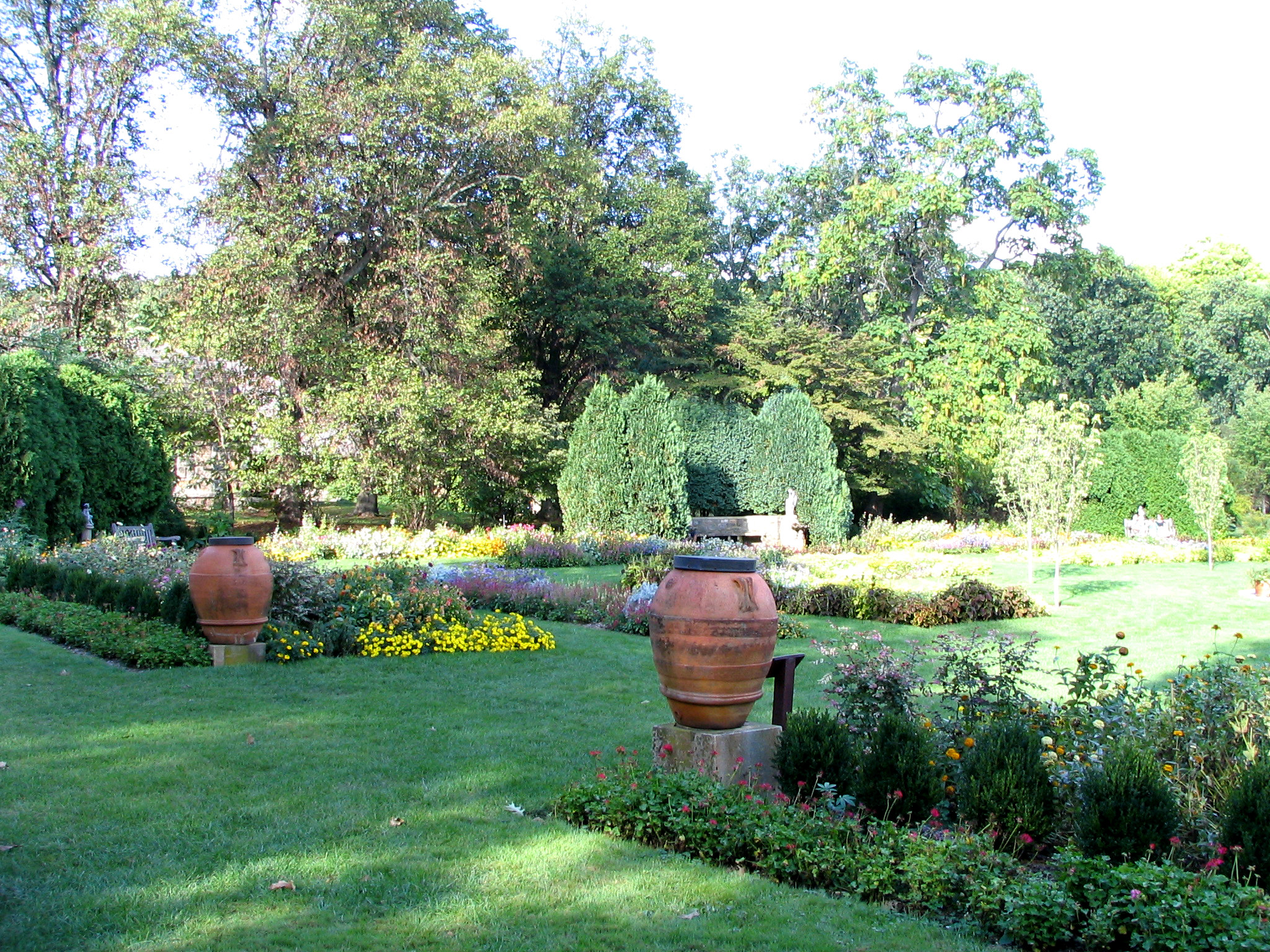
The State Botanical Garden at Skylands

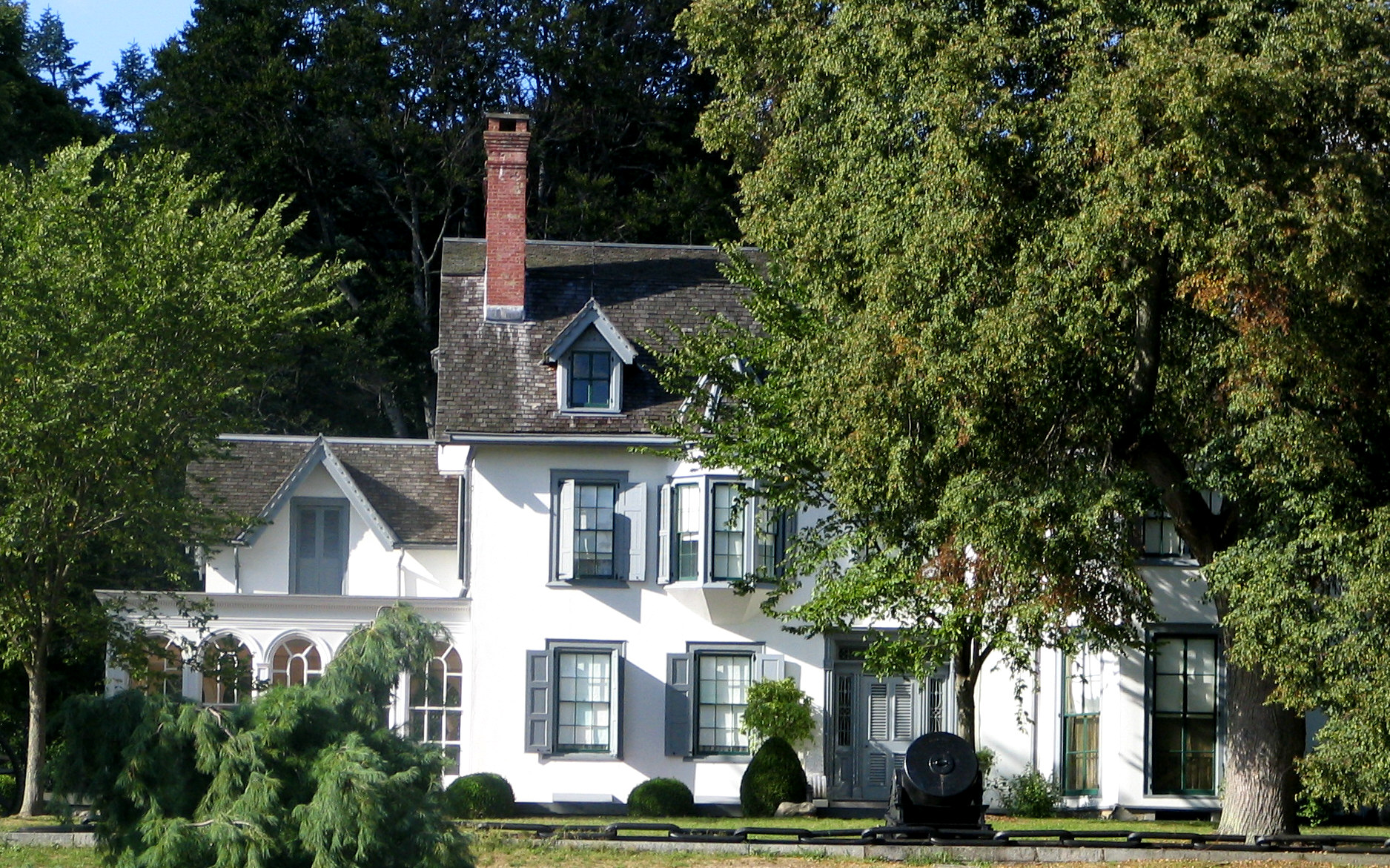
Ringwood Manor showing a mortar and part of the Great Chain

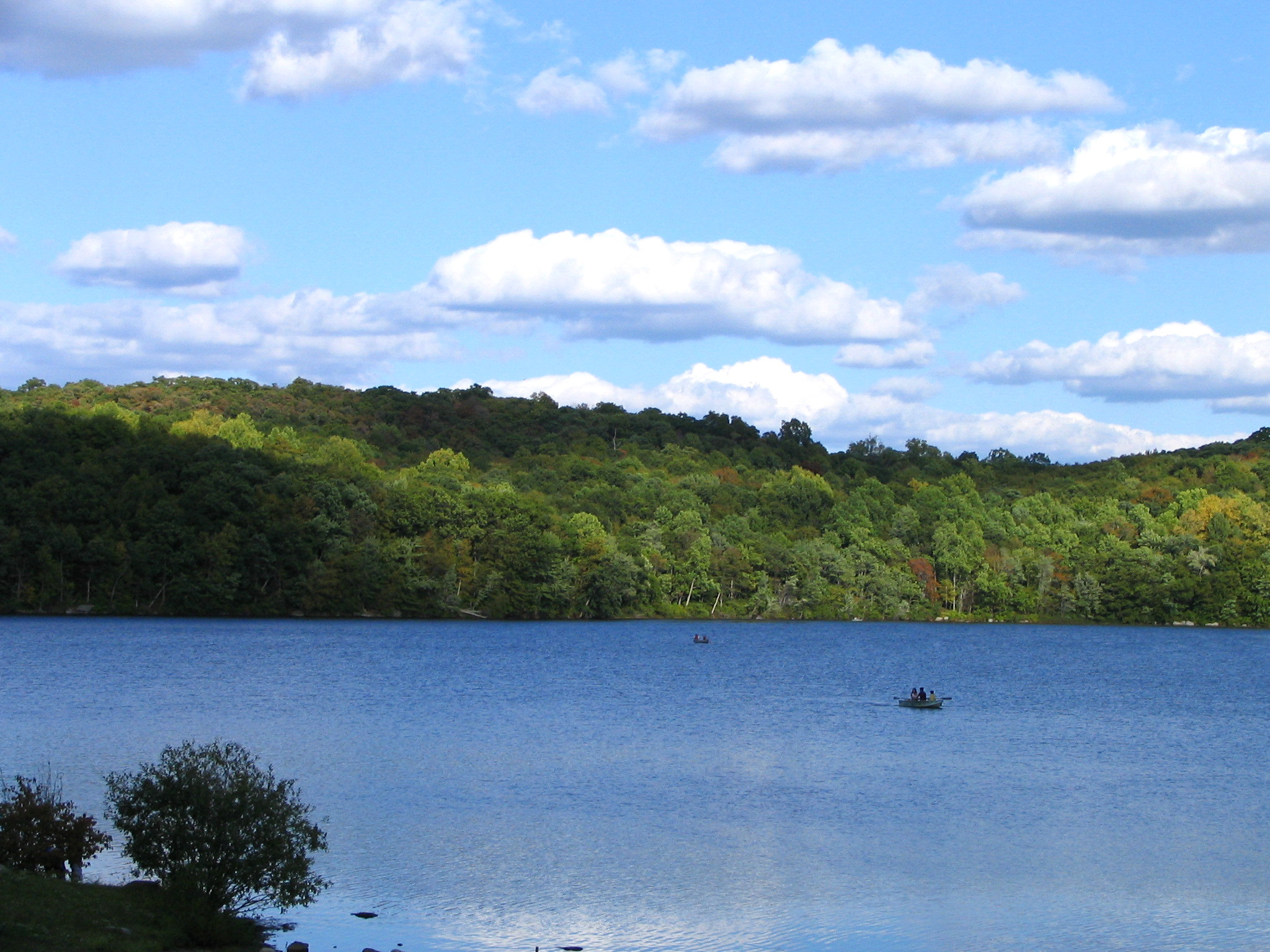
Shepherd Lake Recreation Area

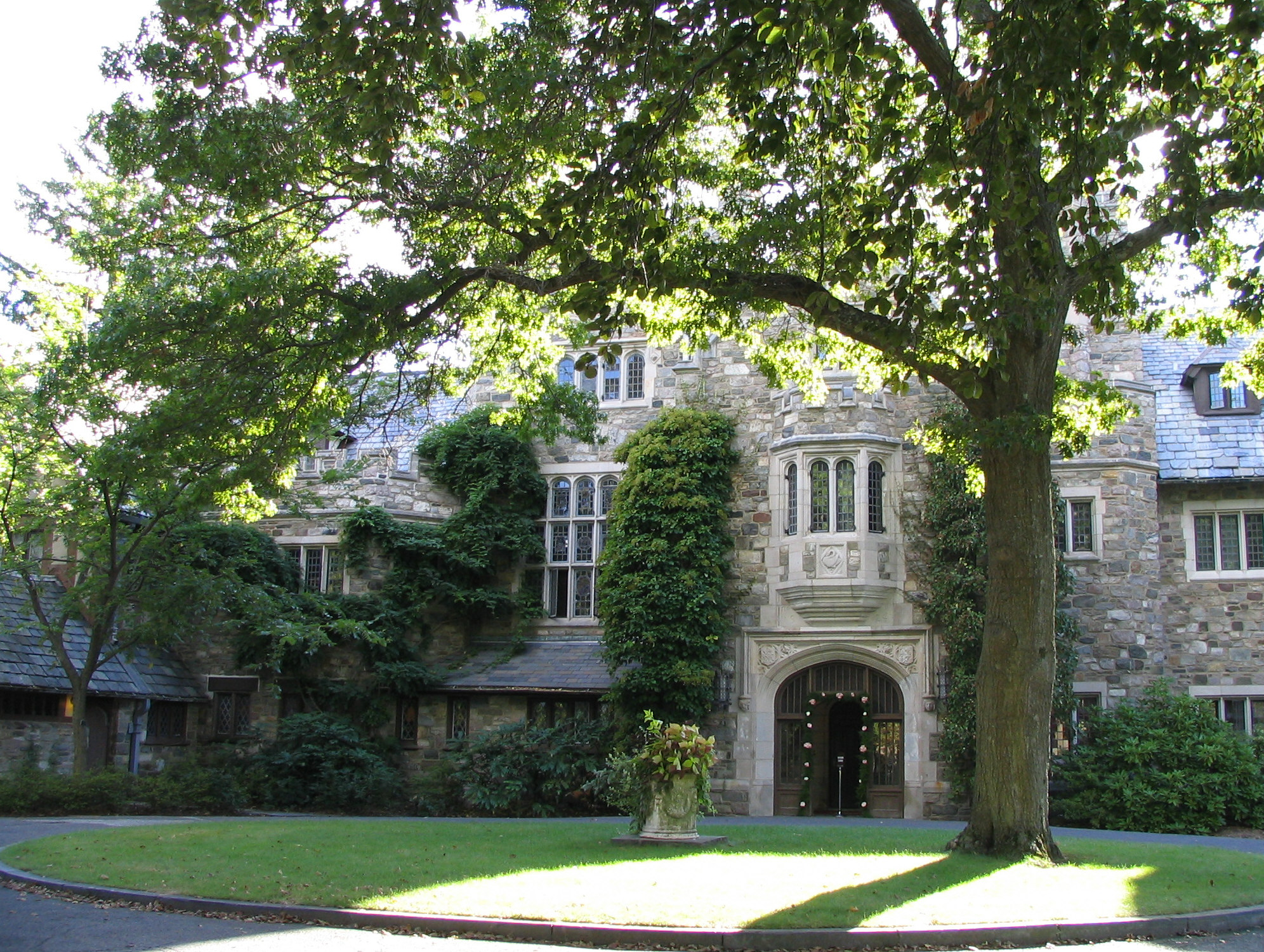
Skylands Manor
Ringwood Creek just south of Ringwood Manor

== See also ==
- Bald Mountain
- List of New Jersey state parks
