= Robert Erskine (inventor) =

Scottish-American engineer (1735–1780)

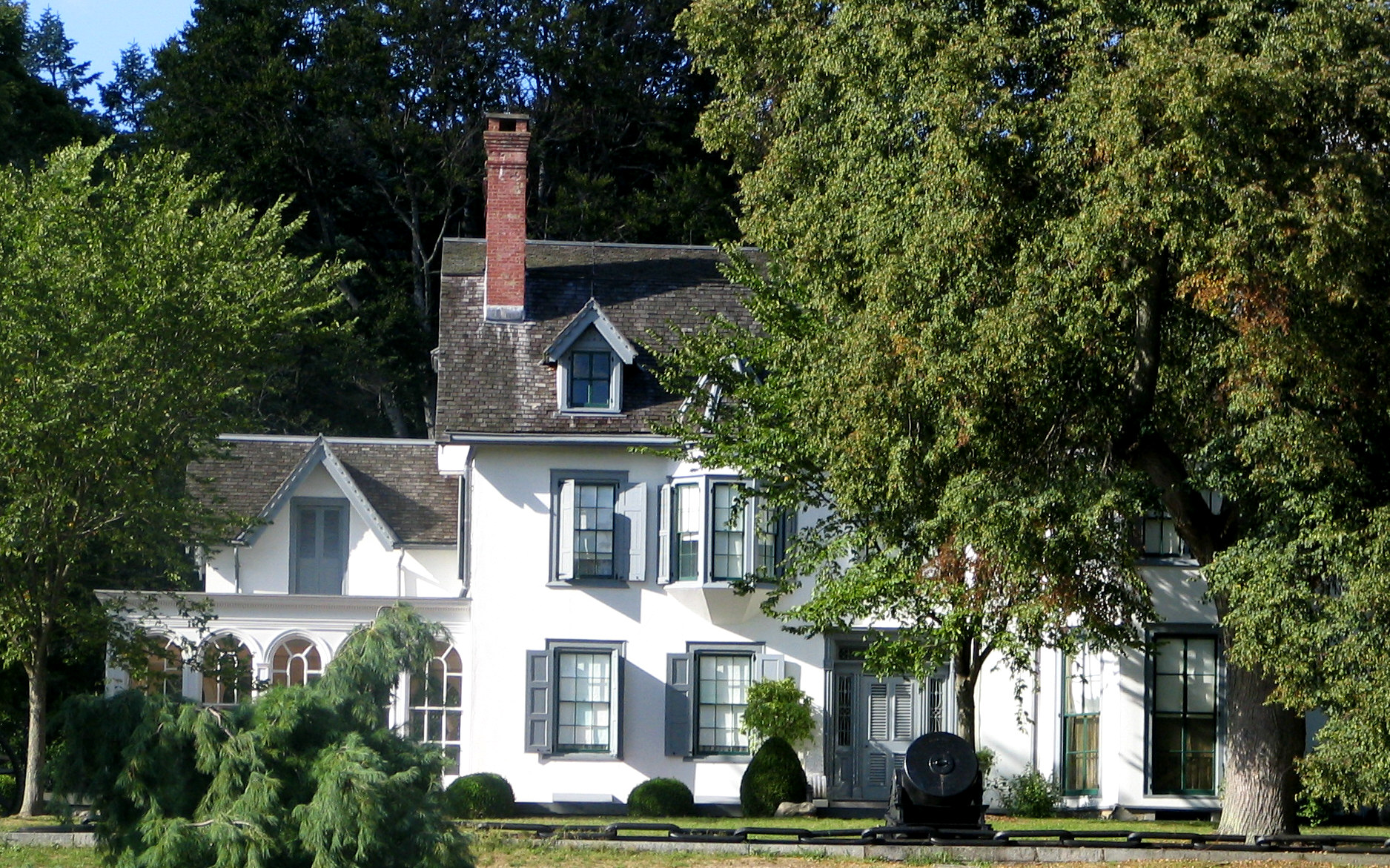
Ringwood Manor, with an artillery mortar and part of a replica of the Hudson River Chain in front

Robert Erskine (1735–1780) was a Scottish inventor and engineer who came to the British colonial Province of New Jersey in 1771 to run the ironworks at Ringwood, New Jersey. He subsequently became sympathetic to the movement for independence. In 1776 during the American Revolutionary War he designed an underwater cheval-de-frise that was installed across the Hudson River at the north end of Manhattan to prevent passage of British ships upriver.

In 1777 General George Washington appointed him as Geographer and Surveyor General of the Continental Army at the rank of colonel. In that role Erskine drew more than 275 maps, mostly of the Northeast region.

== Early life ==
Erskine was born in Scotland and attended the University of Edinburgh. As a young man he started a business, but it failed. He invented the "Continual Stream Pump" and "Platometer", a centrifugal hydraulic engine, and experimented with other hydraulic systems. He became known as an inventor and engineer of some renown in his native land. Erskine also became active in civic issues and increasingly gained the respect of his community.

== Immigration to New Jersey ==
In 1771 at the age of 36 he was elected a Fellow of the Royal Society, a prestigious appointment in the scientific community. That year the owners of an ironworks near Ringwood, New Jersey, hired Erskine to replace Peter Hasenclever as ironmaster. The latter's profligate spending had nearly bankrupted the operation. Erskine immediately set about trying to make the operation profitable. His efforts were cut short by the American Revolutionary War. Erskine was sympathetic to the American cause, but worried that he might lose his workers to the army. Instead he organised them into a citizen militia and was appointed as captain in August 1775.

== Colonial service in the Revolutionary War ==
Once the war broke out in earnest the Colonials were concerned that British warships would gain control of the Hudson River and separate New England from the rest of the colonies. Erskine designed a tetrahedron-shaped marine cheval-de-frise, a defensive barrier of pointed logs strung together abreast the river to prevent warships from sailing upriver. It was installed between Fort Washington on the northern end of Manhattan and Fort Lee, New Jersey in 1776.

George Washington was impressed with Erskine from the moment they met in 1777, and appointed him to the post of Geographer and Surveyor General of the Continental Army. In that role Erskine drew more than 275 maps covering the northern sector of the war. His maps of the region, showing roads, buildings, and other details, were of much use to General Washington and remain historically valuable today. Many of these maps can be found in the Erskine Dewitt Map Collection at the New-York Historical Society.

Erskine also kept the Ringwood ironworks in operation, supplying critical munitions and materials to Washington's army.

== Personal life ==
While out on a map-making expedition in 1780, Erskine became ill. He died on 2 October 1780, probably of pneumonia. He is buried at Ringwood Manor in Ringwood State Park in New Jersey.

== Legacy and honours ==
Erskine was elected a Fellow of the Royal Society In 1771.

He was elected a member to the American Philosophical Society in 1780. It is unclear whether the honor was posthumous.

Erskine Lake, as well as Robert Erskine Elementary School, both in Ringwood, are named after him.

== Maps, surveys and documents ==
- Erskine, Robert. Robert Erskine correspondence. n.d. Library of Congress.
- Erskine, Robert, and Nathanael Greene. [Map of Orange and Rockland Counties Area of New York]. 1779. Copied from surveys laid down by R. Erskine, F.R.S. 1778, 1779.
- Erskine, Robert. Lower Half of an Original Survey Done for His Excy. General Washington. Bergen: Bergen Historical Society, 1920. Printed facsimile of original map in the New-York Historical Society; place names have been copied over for greater clarity. Shows topography, towns, and roads of northern New Jersey. by Robt. Erskine, F.R.S., Geographer to the Army, 1778–1779.
- Erskine, Robert. Litchfield, Conn., to the Highlands of Neversink, Washington: US Army, Corps of Engineers, 1975. Facsimile. Robt. Erskine, F.R.S., Decr. 1779.
- Erskine, Robert, Simeon De Witt, and Richard Varrick De Witt. A List of the Rough Draughts of Surveys by Robert Erskine F.R.S. Geogr. A.US and Assistants, Begun A.D. 1778. 1778. Index to 129 military topographic map titles which in turn describe a series of approximately 341 separate map sheets. (At least 283 of those sheets still exist; an additional dozen sheets appear to be related but are not indexed.) The index describes a territory bounded by the Detroit River in the west, Lake Champlain in the north, the Connecticut River in the east and Charlestown, South Carolina in the south. However, most entries refer to western Connecticut, southeastern New York, northern New Jersey and eastern Pennsylvania. Entries through number 114 are in Erskine's hand. Subsequent entries probably by DeWitt, although nos. 115 and 116 have been attributed to Washington by Guthorn.
- Erskine, Robert, Simeon De Witt, Benjamin Lodge, and Richard Varrick De Witt. Mensurations on the Ice: Feby 7th 1780. 1780. Military topographic map. Covers the counties of Rockland and Westchester in New York. Shows dimensions of that widening of the Hudson River called "Haverstraw Bay." Also shows some roads. Includes text: "Measured on the Ice Feby. 7th Monday 1780 by [????] De[Witt] & Lodge" Both these men served under Erskine. Pen-and-ink, pencil on laid paper.
- Stephen A. Estrin, inc, and Robert Erskine. Westchester Heritage Map: Indian Occupation, Colonial and Revolutionary Names, Structures, and Events. [Tarrytown, N.Y.]: Junior League of Westchester-on-Hudson, 1978. Roads originally surveyed by Robert Erskine 1778–1780; Westchester heritage map prepared in 1977, 1978, by Stephen A. Estrin, inc., Carmel, N.Y., from Map of Westchester County showing Indian Occupation, compiled by Westchester Historical Society with workers from the Emergency Work Bureau of Westchester County, dated 1933, and data supplied by the Westchester Heritage Task Force.
- Partridge, Edward Laselle, and Robert Erskine. Plan for Creation of a National Preserve ... Commemorative of the War of the American Revolution, and for the Preservation of the Natural Beauty of the Hudson River and of the Highlands of the Hudson, 1904. The map is a facsimile of surveys done for General Washington by Robert Erskine in 1778/79.
