= Hewitt Sisters =

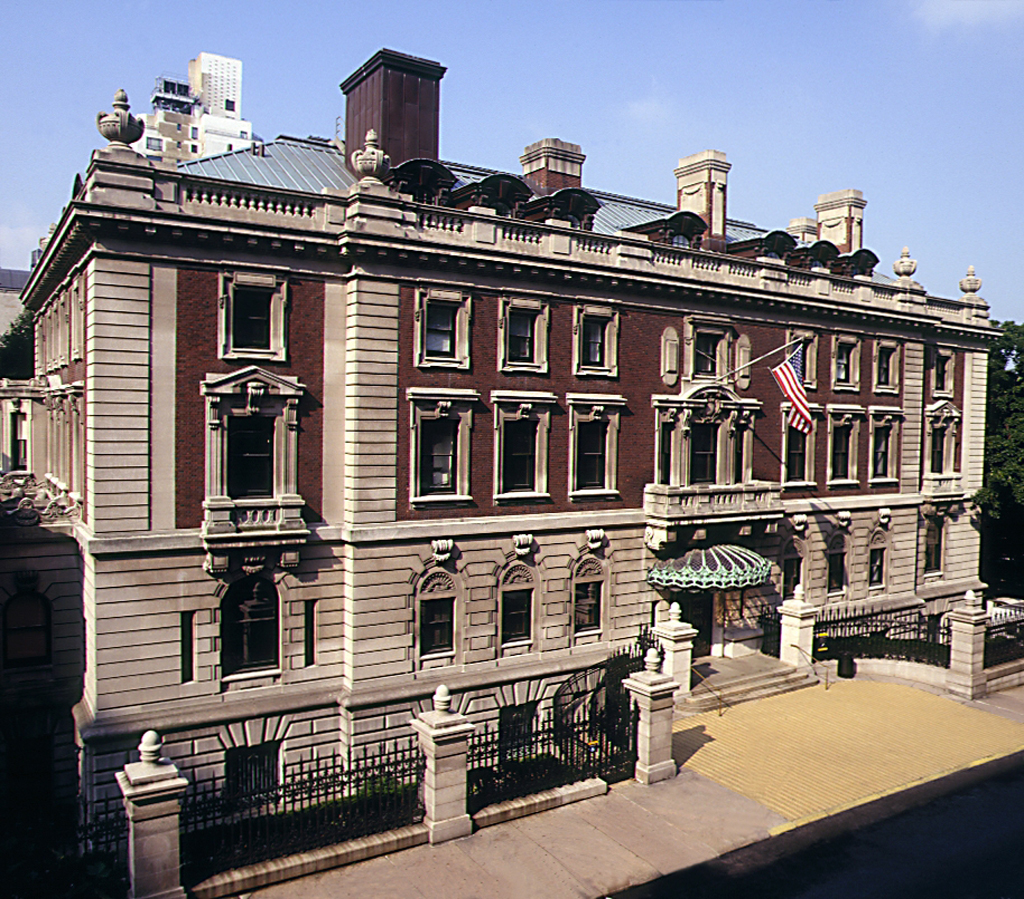
The Cooper Hewitt, Smithsonian Design Museum

Sarah Hewitt and Eleanor Hewitt, also known as the Hewitt Sisters, were American art advocates and founders of what is today the Cooper Hewitt, Smithsonian Design Museum in New York City. They are the granddaughters of Peter Cooper, an American industrialist, inventor, philanthropist, and founder of the Cooper Union for the Advancement of Science and Art. The sisters first established the museum on the fourth floor of the Cooper Union. They sought to foster American design and appreciation for the decorative arts.

== Biography ==
In addition to being the granddaughters of Peter Cooper, Sarah (1859–1930) and Eleanor (1864–1924) were the daughters of Abram Hewitt, mayor of New York City from 1878 to 1888. The sisters were well educated and brought up by a family of philanthropists. By the age of sixteen, they had already begun to build their collection with the acquisition of rare textiles at auction. They continued to build their collection of decorative arts during their travels to Europe and with the help of financial and familial resources. In 1897, they founded the Cooper Union Museum for the Arts of Decoration, to be open to the public as a place for practical learning, in which students could experience participatory learning. In 1907, they formed an advisory committee to assist them with the growth of the museum. Financier and philanthropist, J. P. Morgan was a committee member and contributor to the sisters' collection. Throughout their lives, the sisters worked to provide a museum whose resources anyone could learn from and access. Neither of the sisters ever married, but instead they focused their energy on their collection and the advancement of arts and education.
