= Skylands (estate) =

Historic house in New Jersey, United States

- U.S. National Register of Historic Places
- New Jersey Register of Historic Places
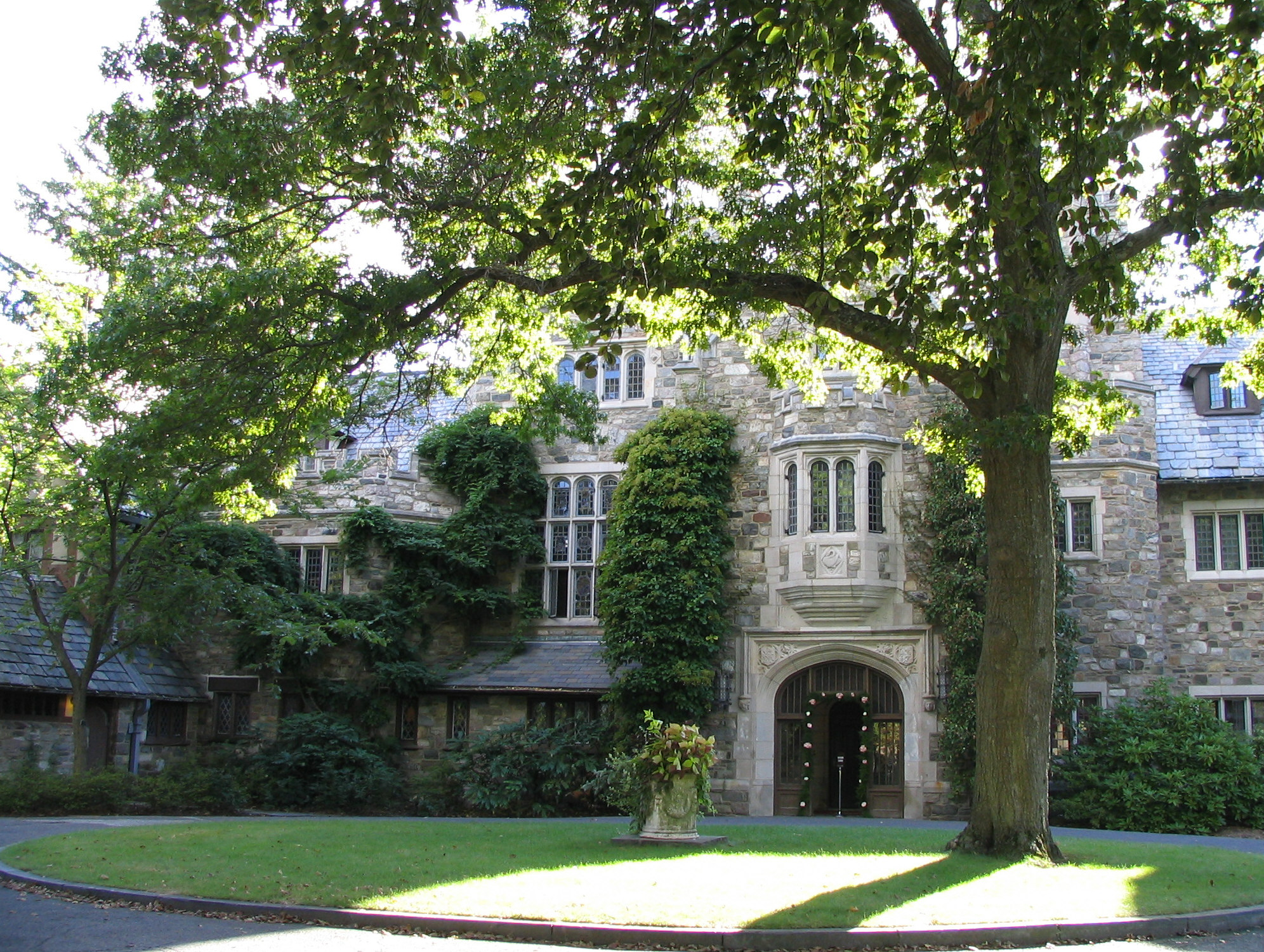
- Skylands manor

- Location within Passaic County, New Jersey Location within New Jersey Location within the United States
- Location: Ringwood State Park, Ringwood, New Jersey
- Coordinates: 41°7′30″N 74°14′14″W
- Area: 96 acres (39 ha)
- Built: 1922
- Architect: John Russell Pope
- Architectural style: Tudor Revival
- Website: Official website
- NRHP reference No.: 90001438
- NJRHP No.: 2405

Significant dates
- Added to NRHP: September 28, 1990
- Designated NJRHP: February 28, 1990

Skylands is a 1,119-acre (4.53 km^{2}) estate property located in Ringwood State Park in Ringwood, New Jersey, a borough in Passaic County in the state of New Jersey. The Skylands property consists of the historic Skylands Manor mansion, and the New Jersey Botanical Garden; the botanical garden is 96 acres (390,000 m^{2}) and it is open to the public year-round. The Skylands property is within the Ramapo Mountains and it is maintained by the Skylands Association. The property is marketed with the garden as New Jersey State Botanical Garden at Skylands.

The house and gardens, including formal gardens and specimen plantings, were built in the 1920s by Clarence MacKenzie Lewis, a New York City stockbroker and civil engineer. Lewis hired architect John Russell Pope to design the 44-room Tudor Revival manor house. The manor is a reproduction English mansion featuring rectangular, bay and oriel windows. A nine-hole golf course once graced this property. In addition, from circa 1950 the property was used as a college campus for Shelton College until in 1966 the state purchased the 1,117 acres of Skylands from the college, which moved to Cape May.

The estate was added to the National Register of Historic Places on September 28, 1990, for its significance in architecture and landscape architecture.

== Garden ==
In 1966, the State of New Jersey purchased the entire estate to establish the New Jersey State Botanical Garden. The property now includes slightly more than 4,000 acres (16 km²) of parkland and contains a wide range of specialized garden areas, including a crab apple allée, perennial garden, peony garden, Lilac Garden, azalea garden, magnolia walk, octagonal garden, wildflower garden, hosta and rhododendron garden, annual garden, summer garden, and moraine garden.

Garden maintenance is shared between employees of the New Jersey State Park Service and volunteers from the Skylands Association, the nonprofit partner that supports the site.

The Winter Garden included New Jersey's largest Jeffery pine (Pinus jeffreyi). Its east side features a weeping beech beside a century-old upright beech, as well as a Japanese umbrella pine. Other interesting non-native trees include an Algerian fir (Abies numidica) and an Atlas cedar (Cedrus atlantica).

Annual Garden The layout of the Annual Garden remains true to its original design; however, the plantings are refreshed each season. This allows for a dynamic display that changes from year to year while preserving the garden’s historic framework and design intent.

Perennial Garden Located just south of the Annual Garden, the Perennial Garden is designed in a series of “garden rooms” that provide visual interest throughout the growing season. This space has been carefully restored to Mr. Lewis’ original design and continues to offer color, texture, and structure across all seasons.

Lilac Garden While some of the lilacs on the property likely predate Mr. Lewis’s ownership, the majority were planted under his oversight during the 1920s. Approximately 200 plants were installed during this period, including both species and named cultivars originating from France, as well as a Japanese tree lilac. Today, the Lilac Garden features more than 100 cultivars. The collection is actively being evaluated, with ongoing efforts to identify existing plants and expand the diversity of the collection.

== Gallery ==
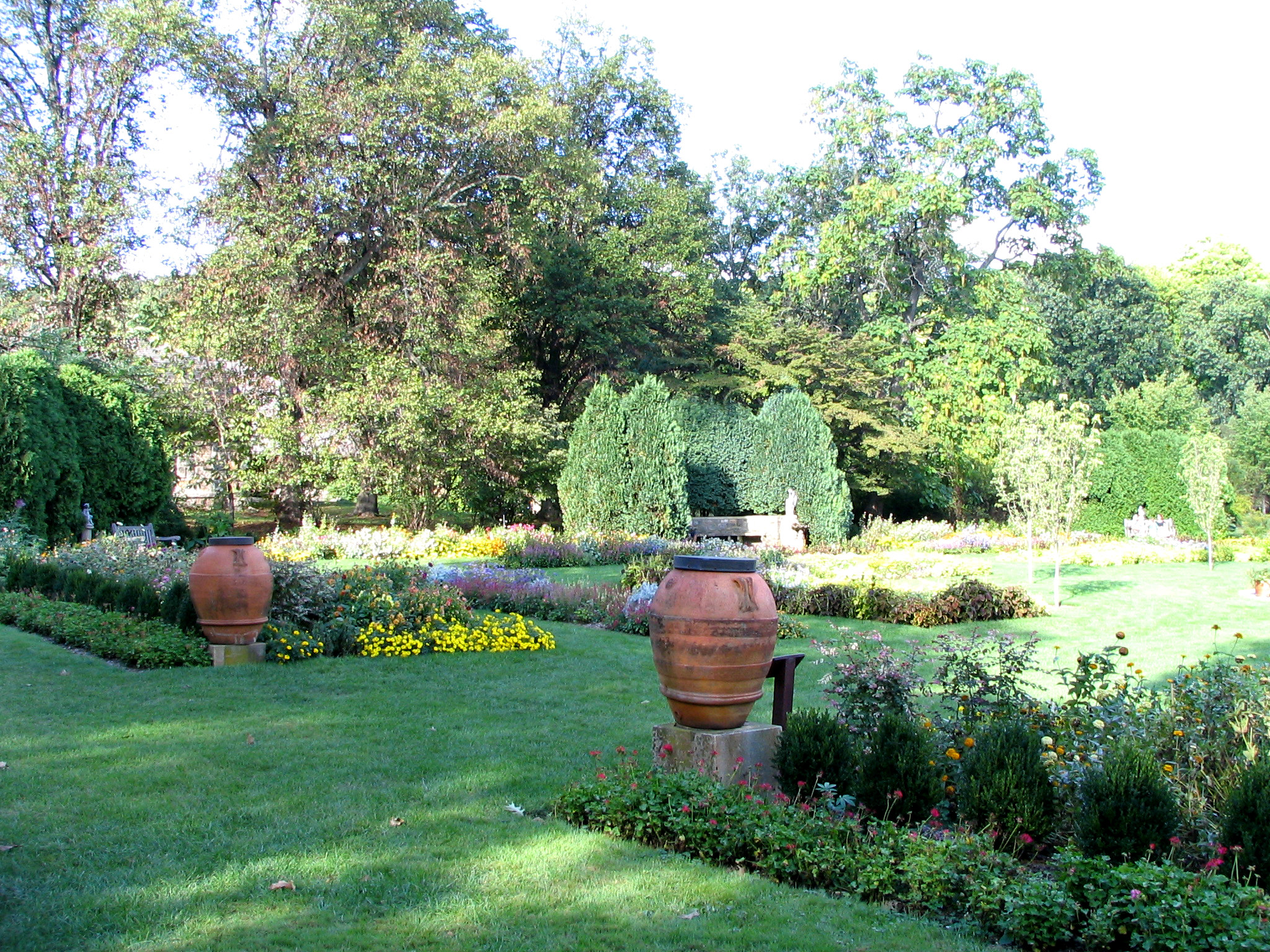
The State Botanical Garden at Skylands

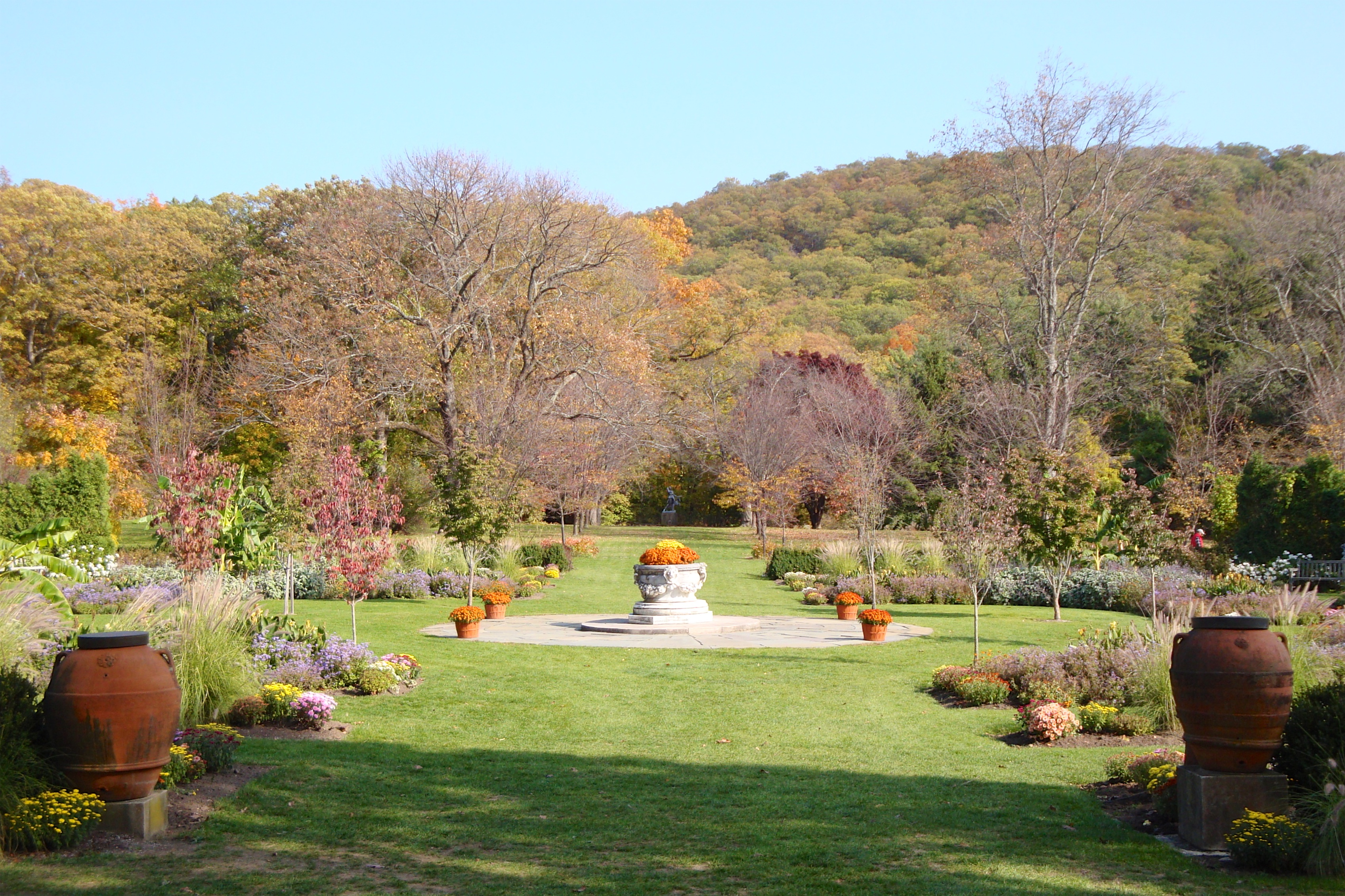
Fall view of the garden

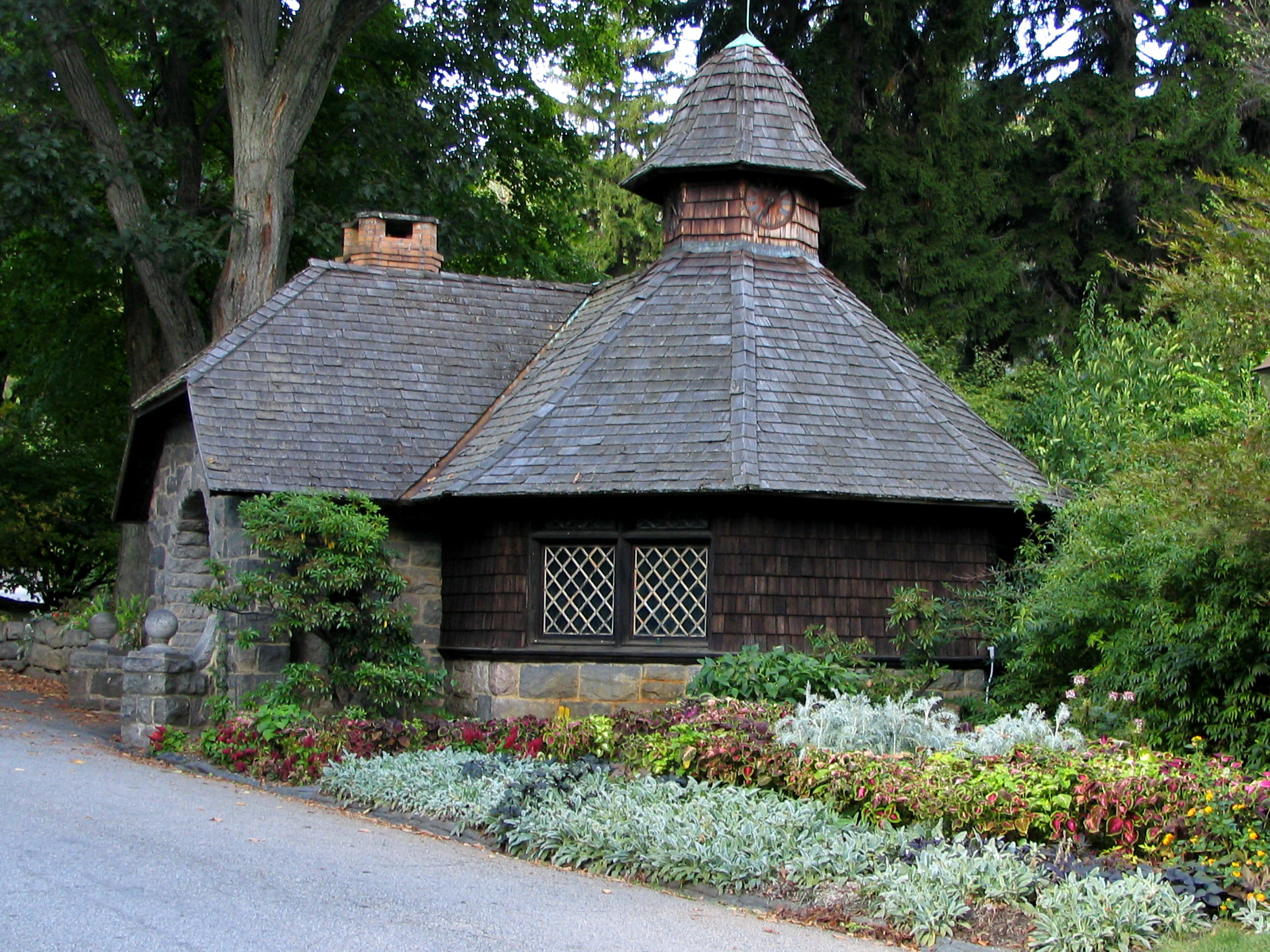
An Outbuilding at Skylands Manor

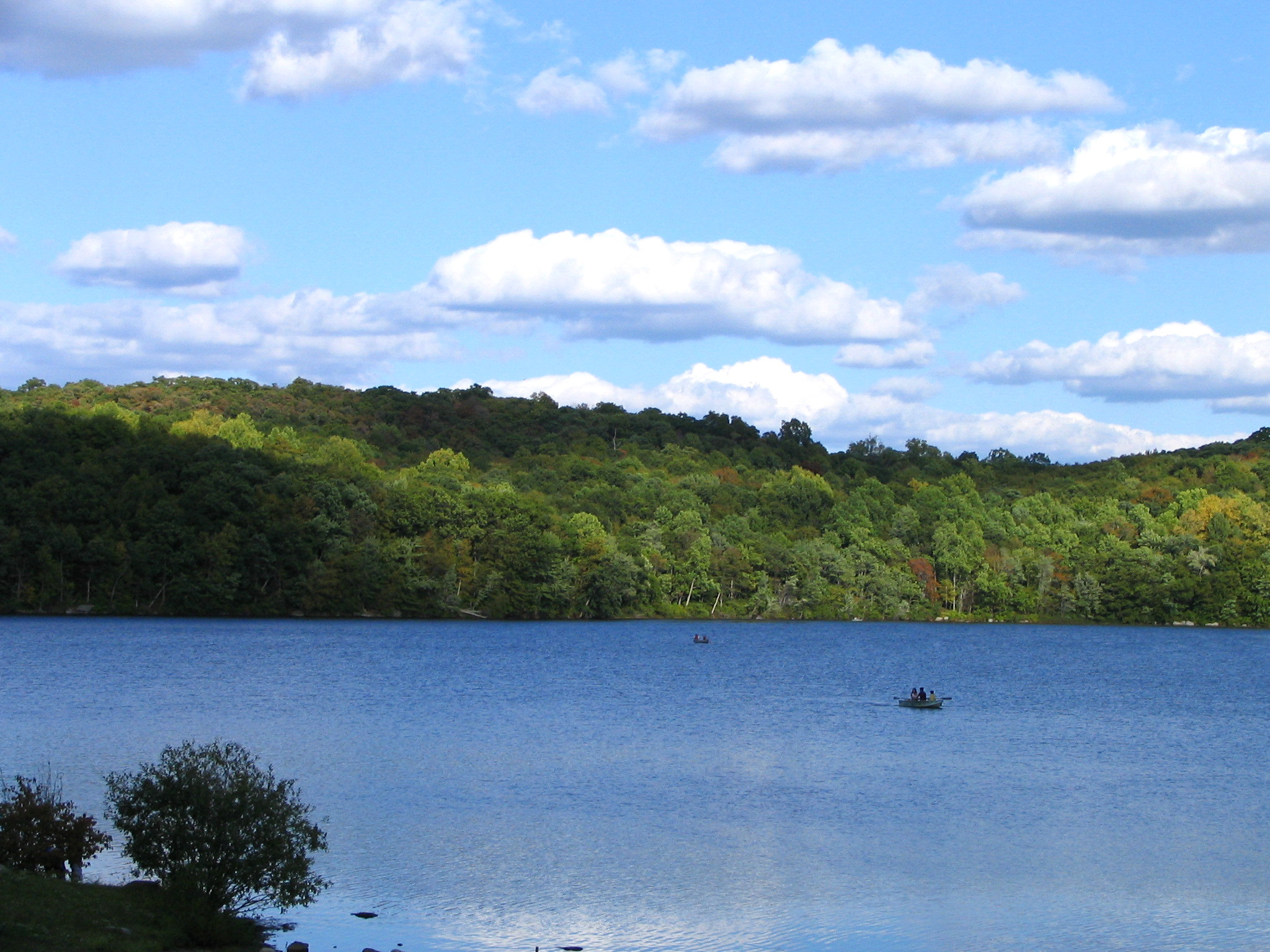
Shepherd Lake Recreation Area

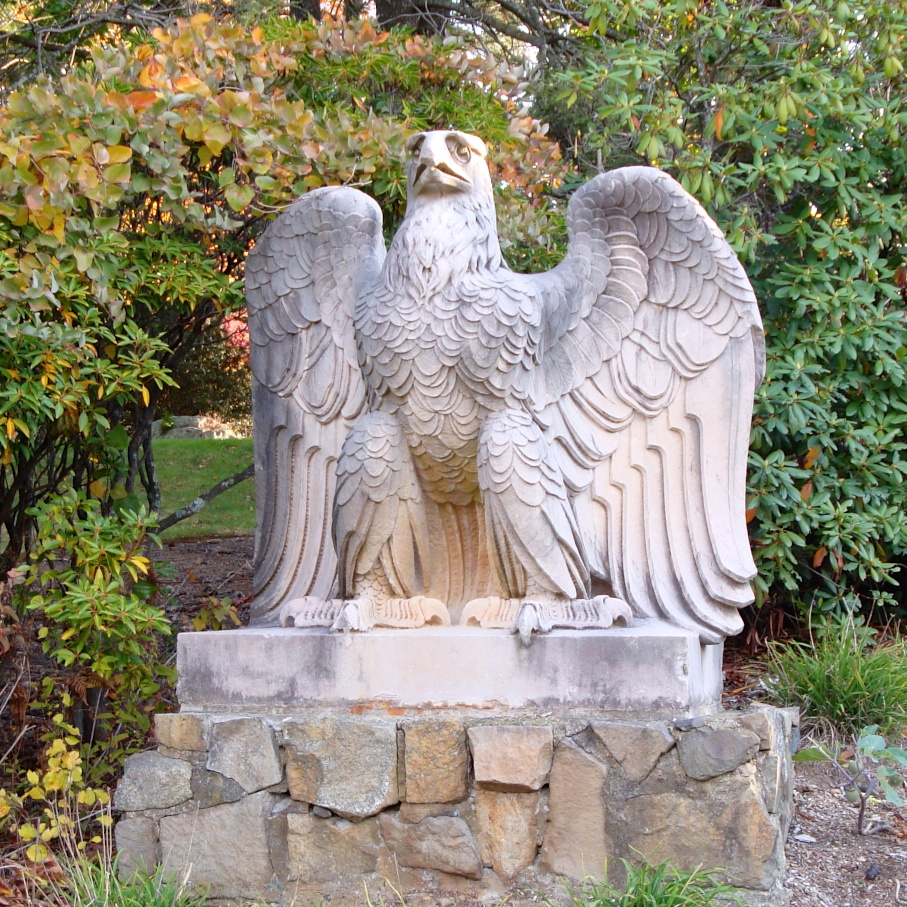
Eagle by Adolph Weinman from Pennsylvania Station (1910–1963), now at Skylands

== See also ==
- List of botanical gardens in the United States
- National Register of Historic Places listings in Passaic County, New Jersey
