= Federal Hill =

Federal Hill may refer to:

In Malaysia:

- Federal Hill, Kuala Lumpur, Malaysia

In the United States:

- Federal Hill, a mansion featured on Kentucky's State Quarter and the centerpiece of My Old Kentucky Home State Park in Bardstown, Kentucky
- Federal Hill, Baltimore, Maryland, a neighborhood and a park (earlier site of celebration by Baltimore Town citizens over ratification of the U.S. Constitution in 1788, observation post and tower for arriving ships and later of a former Union Army fort overlooking downtown Baltimore and its harbor basin - Inner Harbor during the Civil War)
- Federal Hill, Providence, Rhode Island, an historic neighborhood and "Little Italy" in Providence, Rhode Island
  - Federal Hill (film), a 1994 movie set in Providence, Rhode Island
- Federal Hill (Forest, Virginia), listed on the National Register of Historic Places in Campbell County, Virginia
- Federal Hill (Fredericksburg, Virginia), listed on the National Register of Historic Places in Fredericksburg, Virginia
- Federal Hill (Bloomingdale, New Jersey), a ridge in the New Jersey Highlands and location of the Pompton Mutiny during the Revolutionary War

== See also ==
- Federal Hill Historic District (disambiguation)
