= Bloomingdale Cornet Band =

- Formation: 1884
- Type: Marching, Jazz and Concert Bands community band
- Legal status: Active
- Location: Bloomingdale, Passaic County, New Jersey, United States
- Members: Amateur and professional volunteer members
- Music Director/Jazz and Marching Band Director: Michael Kallimanis Concert Band Conductor Dave Wisneski
- Website: www.bloomingdaleband.org
- Remarks: Oldest continually active band in New Jersey

The Bloomingdale Cornet Band, from Bloomingdale, New Jersey, is one of the oldest continually active bands in the Garden State. It is categorized as a Community band.

The band is composed of amateur and professional volunteer members and is fully active, marching in parades and performing in concerts primarily in the northern New Jersey area. The instrumentation consists of brass, woodwinds and percussion instruments. The organization has three ensembles: a Parade Band, a Big Band and a Concert Band.

== History ==
On May 30, 1884, the band played its first parade on what is now known as Memorial Day. The band was organized some time before its first performance. However, the first documented records that are known to exist are news accounts of this first performance. A "cornet band" was a common designation for wind bands organized during the Gilded Age. No defined instrumental make up (i.e. only brass instruments) exists at its inception; however, twelve people were listed as the original founding members. The first director was Alfred Bedson. A series of directors followed until 1889, when Samuel R. Donald became director and served in that capacity until 1939. Other directors have followed and at the present time, the band is directed by Mike Kallimanis.

About 4 months after its first performance, for reasons not documented, the band was split and a band based in the adjacent town of Butler, New Jersey was organized under the auspices of the largest employer, the Butler Hard Rubber Company. The company was led by Richard Butler, Secretary for the American Pedestal Association, which handled the fund-raising for the building of the pedestal for the Statue of Liberty. This rival band, the Butler Silver Cornet Band, was considered a company band of the rubber company. A noted Massachusetts musician named Jeremiah J. O'Sullivan was hired by the company, shortly after the band was organized, to be the leader of the Butler band. This rivalry led to some members of the Bloomingdale Cornet Band, who worked for the rubber company, to be fired at the request of members of the Silver Cornet Band. The rivalry diminished over time. By 1889, both bands united in some performances and hosting fundraising events.

The band has retained the "Cornet" in its name, as has a handful of other similar bands in the United States, such as the Franklin Silver Cornet Band.

== See also ==
- Community band
- Concert band
