= Highlands Water Protection and Planning Act =

The Highlands Water Protection and Planning Act is a 2004 New Jersey law aimed at protecting the Highlands region of northwest New Jersey by regulating development within the region under the supervision of the New Jersey Highlands Water Protection and Planning Council (Highlands Council), under the New Jersey Department of Environmental Protection. The Highlands region covers 859,000 acres (3,480 km^{2}), nearly one-ninth of the state, and is home to 880,000 residents. The area is primarily in Warren, Morris, Hunterdon, Passaic, and Sussex counties, while also reaching into parts of Bergen and Somerset counties. The act is intended to preserve both large volumes of New Jersey's fresh water sources for 5.4 million residents and the biodiversity in the area, in the face of increasing development in the exurbs of New York City. The act was signed into law on August 10, 2004, by Governor of New Jersey James McGreevey.

The provisions of the Act are monitored and controlled by the Highlands Water Protection and Planning Council. The Council has 15 members, with a minimum of eight officials named from the Highlands Region, at least five of whom are municipal officials and three of whom must be county officials. It is allocated within the Department of Environmental Protection but is independent of any supervision or control by the department or by the commissioner or any officer or employee thereof. The Highlands Council approved the Highlands Regional Master Plan on July 17, 2008, and the plan became effective on September 8, 2008, after the governor's review period.

Legal challenges to the Highlands Act have been filed, including at least one in federal court in Trenton. In that case, the Phillipsburg Alliance Church of Phillipsburg, Warren County, sued the Commissioner of the Department of Environmental Protection seeking to enjoin her and NJDEP from denying the church an exemption under the Highlands Act which would permit it to build its proposed new church sanctuary on a 30-acre (120,000 m^{2}) parcel in neighboring Lopatcong, New Jersey. The property lies on the boundary of the Highland's Act's Preservation and Planning Areas.

== Municipalities ==
The following municipalities are in the region regulated by the act:

- Bergen County
  - Mahwah Township
  - Oakland
- Hunterdon County
  - Alexandria Township
  - Bethlehem Township
  - Bloomsbury
  - Califon
  - Clinton Township
  - Clinton
  - Glen Gardner
  - Hampton
  - High Bridge
  - Holland Township
  - Lebanon Township
  - Lebanon
  - Milford
  - Tewksbury Township
  - Union Township
- Morris County
  - Boonton Township
  - Boonton
  - Butler
  - Chester Township
  - Chester
  - Denville Township
  - Dover
  - Hanover Township
  - Harding Township
  - Jefferson Township
  - Kinnelon
  - Mendham Township
  - Mendham
  - Mine Hill Township
  - Montville Township
  - Morris Plains
  - Morris Township
  - Morristown
  - Mount Arlington
  - Mount Olive Township
  - Mountain Lakes
  - Netcong
  - Parsippany-Troy Hills Township
  - Pequannock Township
  - Randolph Township
  - Riverdale
  - Rockaway Township
  - Rockaway
  - Roxbury Township
  - Randolph Township(Pending gubernatorial approval)
  - Victory Gardens
  - Washington Township
  - Wharton
- Passaic County
  - Bloomingdale
  - Pompton Lakes
  - Ringwood
  - Wanaque
  - West Milford Township
- Somerset County
  - Bedminster Township
  - Bernards Township
  - Bernardsville
  - Far Hills
  - Peapack-Gladstone
- Sussex County
  - Byram Township
  - Franklin
  - Green Township
  - Hamburg
  - Hardyston Township
  - Hopatcong
  - Ogdensburg
  - Sparta Township
  - Stanhope
  - Vernon Township
- Warren County
  - Allamuchy Township
  - Alpha
  - Belvidere
  - Franklin Township
  - Frelinghuysen Township
  - Greenwich Township
  - Hackettstown
  - Harmony Township
  - Hope Township
  - Independence Township
  - Liberty Township
  - Lopatcong Township
  - Mansfield Township
  - Oxford Township
  - Phillipsburg
  - Pohatcong
  - Washington Township
  - Washington
  - White Township
