= Federal Hill Historic District =

Federal Hill Historic District may refer to:

- Federal Hill Historic District (Bristol, Connecticut), listed on the National Register of Historic Places in Hartford County, Connecticut
- Federal Hill, Baltimore, a Baltimore, Maryland neighborhood which includes NRHP-listed Federal Hill Historic District and Federal Hill South Historic District
- Federal Hill Historic District (Lynchburg, Virginia), listed on the National Register of Historic Places in Lynchburg, Virginia

== See also ==
- Federal Hill (disambiguation)
