= Butler Public Schools =

School district in Morris County, New Jersey, US

Address
- 38 Bartholdi Avenue Butler, Morris County, New Jersey, 07405
- Coordinates: 40.997173°N 74.340576°W

District information
- Grades: K-12
- Superintendent: Daniel Johnson
- Business administrator: Pamela Vargas
- Schools: 3

Students and staff
- Enrollment: 1,156 (as of 2021–22)
- Faculty: 109.7 FTEs
- Student–teacher ratio: 10.5:1

Other information
- District Factor Group: DE
- Website: www.butlerboe.org
Ind.	Per pupil	District spending	Rank (*)	K-12 average	%± vs. average
1A	Total Spending	$20,152	37	$18,891	6.7%
1	Budgetary Cost	16,138	41	14,783	9.2%
2	Classroom Instruction	8,661	32	8,763	−1.2%
6	Support Services	3,031	43	2,392	26.7%
8	Administrative Cost	1,924	42	1,485	29.6%
10	Operations & Maintenance	2,015	40	1,783	13.0%
13	Extracurricular Activities	505	33	268	88.4%
16	Median Teacher Salary	65,260	39	64,043
Data from NJDoE 2014 Taxpayers' Guide to Education Spending. *Of K-12 districts with up to 1,800 students. Lowest spending=1; Highest=49

The Butler Public Schools is a comprehensive community public school district that serves students in kindergarten through twelfth grade from Butler, in Morris County, in the U.S. state of New Jersey.

As of the 2021–22 school year, the district, comprised of three schools, had an enrollment of 1,156 students and 109.7 classroom teachers (on an FTE basis), for a student–teacher ratio of 10.5:1.

Students from Bloomingdale attend Butler High School as part of a sending/receiving relationship with the Bloomingdale School District. In the 2021-22 school year, more than 40% of high school students were from Bloomingdale.

The district is classified by the New Jersey Department of Education as being in District Factor Group "DE", the fifth-highest of eight groups. District Factor Groups organize districts statewide to allow comparison by common socioeconomic characteristics of the local districts. From lowest socioeconomic status to highest, the categories are A, B, CD, DE, FG, GH, I and J.

== History ==
Students from Butler attended high school in Paterson, New Jersey until Butler High School was opened in 1903. From the time the school opened, the school served students from much of Morris County, along with those from Bloomingdale, Ringwood, Wanaque and West Milford in Passaic County until they built their own schools or established alternate arrangements with other school districts. In September 1954, the Butler district notified its eight sending communities that growing enrollment of borough residents would mean that there would be no space available at Butler High School and that the local districts serving students from Passaic County communities and Pequannock Township would have to make alternate arrangements by 1958. While Pequannock, Ringwood and Wanaque met the 1958 deadline, West Milford left four years later and Jefferson Township, Kinnelon and Riverdale ended their sending relationship in 1964.

== Schools ==
Schools in the district (with 2021–22 enrollment data from the National Center for Education Statistics) are:

Elementary school

- Aaron Decker School with 379 students in grades K-4
  - James Manco, principal

Middle school

- Richard Butler School with 299 students in grades 5-8
  - Michelle Papa, principal

High school

- Butler High School with 455 students in grades 9-12
  - Rory Fitzgerald, principal

The Academy for Law and Public Safety is a full-time, four-year high school program located at Butler High School. The Academy focuses on Law, Government and Public Affairs with concentrations in Law, Criminal Justice, Technology, Humanities and Law Enforcement. The academy was founded in September 2000, as a collaborative effort of the Morris County Vocational School District, the Butler Public Schools and the Morris County Board of County Commissioners.

== Administration ==
Core members of the district's administration are:

- Daniel Johnson, superintendent
- Pamela Vargas, business administrator and board secretary

== Board of education ==
The district's board of education, comprised of nine members, sets policy and oversees the fiscal and educational operation of the district through its administration. The Bloomingdale district sends a non-voting representative to the board. As a Type II school district, the board's trustees are elected directly by voters to serve three-year terms of office on a staggered basis, with three seats up for election each year held (since 2012) as part of the November general election. The board appoints a superintendent to oversee the district's day-to-day operations and a business administrator to supervise the business functions of the district.
