= Kirsten Kraa =

American painter (1940-2020)

- Born: April 2, 1940; Munich, Germany
- Died: June 9, 2020 (aged 80); West Orange, New Jersey, U.S.
- Known for: Painting

Kirsten Kraa (April 2, 1941 – June 9, 2020) was an American painter and educator.

Kraa was born in Munich, Germany on April 2, 1941. She emigrated with her family to the United States in 1956, initially to Fort Lee, New Jersey, and then lived with her family in Pequannock Township, New Jersey, and graduated from Butler High School. She graduated from Douglass College in 1963, where she served as an assistant art professor, and was awarded a master of Fine Arts from Rutgers University in 1965. Her teachers included Roy Lichtenstein and Ulfert Wilke.

A longtime resident of Verona, New Jersey, Kraa died on June 9, 2020, in West Orange, New Jersey.

Her work is in The Aldrich Contemporary Art Museum and the Museum of Modern Art.
