= Mayor Dunleavy Memorial Park =

Park in New Jersey, US

- Interactive map of Mayor Dunleavy Memorial Park
- Type: County park
- Location: Bloomingdale, New Jersey, U.S.
- Coordinates: 41.010°N 74.333°W
- Area: 44 acres (18 ha)
- Website: Homepage

Mayor Dunleavy Memorial Park (formerly known as Friendship Park) is a 44-acre (18 ha) passive park located off Glenwild Avenue in Bloomingdale, New Jersey. It contains trails and creates opportunities for passive recreation in a natural, woodland setting. The New York–New Jersey Trail Conference has marked several trails with yellow, orange, red, and blue markers in 2012 to guide hikers.
