= Bloomingdale School District =

School district in Passaic County, New Jersey, US

Address
- 225 Glenwild Avenue Bloomingdale, Passaic County, New Jersey, 07403; United States
- Coordinates: 41.005536°N 74.333116°W

District information
- Grades: PreK-8
- Superintendent: Dr. Michael Ryder
- Business administrator: Felicia Kicinski
- Schools: 3

Students and staff
- Enrollment: 564 (as of 2019–20)
- Faculty: 44.8 FTEs
- Student–teacher ratio: 12.6:1

Other information
- District Factor Group: FG
- Website: www.bpsnj.org
Ind.	Per pupil	District spending	Rank (*)	K-8 average	%± vs. average
1A	Total Spending	$20,115	47	$18,891	6.5%
1	Budgetary Cost	17,909	59	14,159	26.5%
2	Classroom Instruction	9,281	41	8,659	7.2%
6	Support Services	4,612	64	2,167	112.8%
8	Administrative Cost	1,985	62	1,547	28.3%
10	Operations & Maintenance	1,872	53	1,612	16.1%
13	Extracurricular Activities	104	26	104	0.0%
16	Median Teacher Salary	66,365	51	61,136
Data from NJDoE 2014 Taxpayers' Guide to Education Spending. *Of K-8 districts with 401-750 students. Lowest spending=1; Highest=64

The Bloomingdale School District is a comprehensive public school district serving students in pre-kindergarten through eighth grade from Bloomingdale, in Passaic County, in the U.S. state of New Jersey.

As of the 2019–20 school year, the district, comprised of three schools, had an enrollment of 564 students and 44.8 classroom teachers (on an FTE basis), for a student–teacher ratio of 12.6:1.

The district is classified by the New Jersey Department of Education as being in District Factor Group "FG", the fourth-highest of eight groupings. District Factor Groups organize districts statewide to allow comparison by common socioeconomic characteristics of the local districts. From lowest socioeconomic status to highest, the categories are A, B, CD, DE, FG, GH, I and J.

For ninth through twelfth grades, high school-aged students from Bloomingdale in public school attend Butler High School in the adjacent community of Butler in Morris County, as part of a sending/receiving relationship with the Butler Public Schools. As of the 2019–20 school year, the high school had an enrollment of 471 students and 38.3 classroom teachers (on an FTE basis), for a student–teacher ratio of 12.3:1. In 2020–21, more than 40% of the students in the high school came from Bloomingdale.

== Schools ==
Schools in the district (with 2019–20 enrollment data from the National Center for Education Statistics) are:

Elementary schools

- Martha B. Day Elementary School with 142 students in grades PreK-1
  - Denise Glenn, principal
- Samuel R. Donald Elementary School with 173 students in grades 2-4
  - Kerridyn Trushiem, principal

Middle school

- Walter T. Bergen Middle School with 241 students in grades 5-8
  - Jon Deeb, principal

== Administration ==
Core members of the district's administration are:

- Dr. Michael Ryder, superintendent
- Felicia Kicinski, business administrator and board secretary

== Board of education ==
The district's board of education is comprised of nine members who set policy and oversee the fiscal and educational operation of the district through its administration. As a Type II school district, the board's trustees are elected directly by voters to serve three-year terms of office on a staggered basis, with three seats up for election each year held (since 2012) as part of the November general election. The board appoints a superintendent to oversee the district's day-to-day operations and a business administrator to supervise the business functions of the district.
