= Bloomingdale, New Jersey =

Borough in Passaic County, New Jersey, US

- Borough
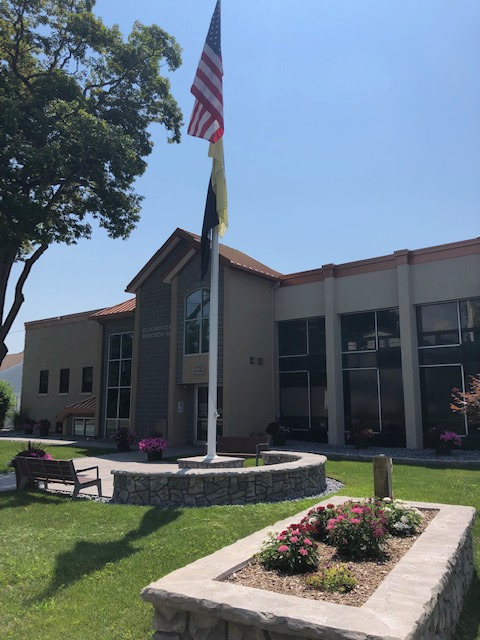
- Bloomingdale Borough Hall

- Seal

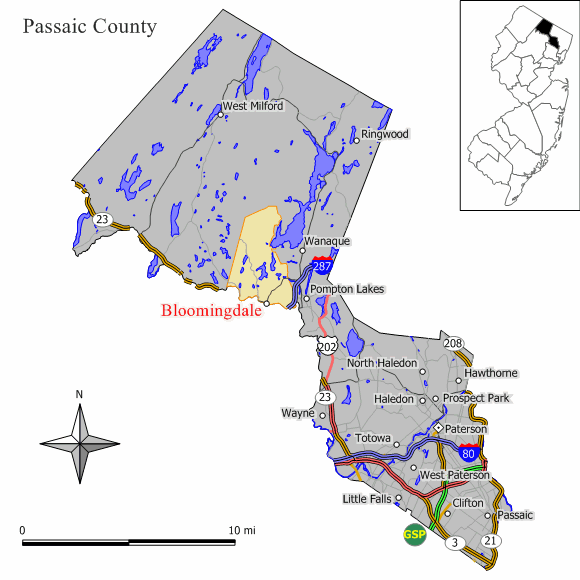
- Map of Bloomingdale in Passaic County. Inset: Location of Passaic County highlighted in the State of New Jersey.

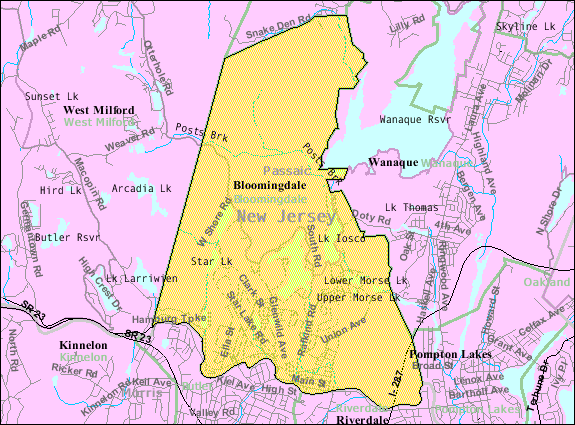
- Census Bureau map of Bloomingdale, New Jersey

- Location in Passaic County Location in New Jersey Location in the United States
- Coordinates: 41.03526°N 74.333737°W
- Country: United States
- State: New Jersey
- County: Passaic
- Incorporated: February 23, 1918

Government
  - Type: Borough
  - Body: Borough Council
  - Mayor: John D'Amato (D, term ending December 31, 2026)
  - Administrator: Michael Sondermeyer
  - Municipal clerk: Breeanna Smith

Area
  - Total: 9.25 sq mi (23.95 km^{2})
  - Land: 8.80 sq mi (22.79 km^{2})
  - Water: 0.45 sq mi (1.16 km^{2}) 4.82%
  - Rank: 217th of 565 in state 6th of 16 in county
- Elevation: 548 ft (167 m)

Population (2020)
  - Total: 7,777
  - Estimate (2023): 7,598
  - Rank: 300th of 565 in state 15th of 16 in county
  - Density: 883.6/sq mi (341.2/km^{2})
  - Rank: 398th of 565 in state 14th of 16 in county
- Time zone: UTC−05:00 (Eastern (EST))
  - Summer (DST): UTC−04:00 (Eastern (EDT))
- ZIP Code: 07403
- Area code: 973
- FIPS code: 3403106340
- GNIS feature ID: 0885161
- Website: www.bloomingdalenj.net

Bloomingdale is a borough in Passaic County, in the U.S. state of New Jersey. As of the 2020 United States census, the borough's population was 7,777, an increase of 121 (+1.6%) from the 2010 census count of 7,656, which in turn reflected an increase of 46 (+0.6%) from the 7,610 counted in the 2000 census.

Bloomingdale is home to four membership lake communities including Glen Wild Lake, Lake Iosco, Kampfe Lake, and Morse Lakes; a suburban neighborhood featuring an upper and lower lake.

== History ==
Bloomingdale's Federal Hill was the site of the 1781 Pompton Mutiny, a winter revolt of Continental Army troops that was crushed by General Robert Howe on direct orders of General George Washington.

Growth in Bloomingdale was driven by the development in the late 1860s of a rubber mill and other factories in neighboring Butler. The New Jersey Midland Railroad, later known as the New York, Susquehanna and Western Railway, laid tracks adjacent to the settlement, with a Bloomingdale station located in what today is Riverdale. The northern section of Riverdale and most of Butler were known as East Bloomingdale and West Bloomingdale respectively during most of the 19th century. Despite crossing a county border, they also shared a school district and residents considered the whole area as "Bloomingdale" until about 1881 when a Post Office named Butler was designated. This began a period of rivalry which caused a schism between the residents of Butler and Bloomingdale resulting in separate schools, churches and even town bands.

Bloomingdale was incorporated as an independent borough on February 23, 1918, when Pompton Township was split up into three new municipalities along with Wanaque and Ringwood. Prior to that, the area was known as Bloomingdale throughout the 19th century and was initially a farming community starting about 1712 with the "Bloomingdale Forge" built shortly thereafter to take advantage of the iron in the hills. The business district along the Paterson-Hamburg Turnpike and the Pequannock River began about the middle of the 19th century.

Bloomingdale, like most municipalities in northeastern North Jersey, is a suburb of New York City. Some of the things that still link Bloomingdale to its past are its two churches (Methodist and Baptist), the Samuel R. Donald School (originally built in 1886) and the Bloomingdale Cornet Band continuously active since 1884.

DeLazier Field, used by the Triboro Little League, was the home field for the Minor League Baseball team known as the Bloomingdale Troopers of the North Atlantic League from 1946 to 1948.

The History of Bloomingdale can be found in three separate books published by the borough in 1958, 1968 and 1993.

== Geography ==
According to the United States Census Bureau, the borough had a total area of 9.25 square miles (23.95 km^{2}), including 8.80 square miles (22.79 km^{2}) of land and 0.45 square miles (1.16 km^{2}) of water (4.82%).

Lake communities in the borough include Glen Wild Lake, Lake Iosco, Kampfe Lake and Lower / Upper Morse Lake.

Unincorporated communities, localities and place names located partially or completely within the borough include Cold Spring Lake, Glenwild Lake, Iosco Lake, Lake Kampfe, Morse Lakes, Mothers Lake, Pompton Junction, Star Lake and Twilliger Lake.

The borough borders Pompton Lakes, Ringwood, Wanaque and West Milford in Passaic County and both Butler and Riverdale in Morris County.

== Demographics ==
Historical population
Census	Pop.	Note	%±
1920	2,193		—
1930	2,543		16.0%
1940	2,606		2.5%
1950	3,251		24.8%
1960	5,293		62.8%
1970	7,797		47.3%
1980	7,867		0.9%
1990	7,530		−4.3%
2000	7,610		1.1%
2010	7,656		0.6%
2020	7,777		1.6%
2023 (est.)	7,598	▼	−2.3%
Population sources: 1920; 1920–1930 1940–2000; 2000 2010 2020

=== 2020 census ===
As of the 2020 census, Bloomingdale had a population of 7,777. The median age was 43.4 years. 17.0% of residents were under the age of 18 and 17.5% of residents were 65 years of age or older. For every 100 females there were 98.7 males, and for every 100 females age 18 and over there were 97.3 males age 18 and over.

97.5% of residents lived in urban areas, while 2.5% lived in rural areas.

There were 3,112 households in Bloomingdale, of which 27.6% had children under the age of 18 living in them. Of all households, 50.4% were married-couple households, 18.7% were households with a male householder and no spouse or partner present, and 24.1% were households with a female householder and no spouse or partner present. About 26.1% of all households were made up of individuals and 9.4% had someone living alone who was 65 years of age or older.

There were 3,267 housing units, of which 4.7% were vacant. The homeowner vacancy rate was 1.7% and the rental vacancy rate was 3.1%.

Racial composition as of the 2020 census
Race	Number	Percent
White	6,175	79.4%
Black or African American	118	1.5%
American Indian and Alaska Native	37	0.5%
Asian	277	3.6%
Native Hawaiian and Other Pacific Islander	1	0.0%
Some other race	465	6.0%
Two or more races	704	9.1%
Hispanic or Latino (of any race)	1,186	15.3%

=== 2010 census ===
The 2010 United States census counted 7,656 people, 2,935 households, and 2,034 families in the borough. The population density was 878.6 per square mile (339.2/km^{2}). There were 3,089 housing units at an average density of 354.5 per square mile (136.9/km^{2}). The racial makeup was 91.97% (7,041) White, 1.14% (87) Black or African American, 0.22% (17) Native American, 2.46% (188) Asian, 0.00% (0) Pacific Islander, 3.03% (232) from other races, and 1.19% (91) from two or more races. Hispanic or Latino of any race were 9.33% (714) of the population.

Of the 2,935 households, 29.8% had children under the age of 18; 56.0% were married couples living together; 8.9% had a female householder with no husband present and 30.7% were non-families. Of all households, 25.1% were made up of individuals and 8.1% had someone living alone who was 65 years of age or older. The average household size was 2.57 and the average family size was 3.10.

21.1% of the population were under the age of 18, 6.4% from 18 to 24, 27.7% from 25 to 44, 29.9% from 45 to 64, and 14.8% who were 65 years of age or older. The median age was 41.8 years. For every 100 females, the population had 96.8 males. For every 100 females ages 18 and older there were 96.4 males.

The Census Bureau's 2006–2010 American Community Survey showed that (in 2010 inflation-adjusted dollars) median household income was $79,044 (with a margin of error of +/− $15,773) and the median family income was $103,972 (+/− $5,906). Males had a median income of $56,974 (+/− $6,604) versus $47,204 (+/− $7,582) for females. The per capita income for the borough was $32,417 (+/− $3,746). About 3.3% of families and 5.7% of the population were below the poverty line, including 5.7% of those under age 18 and none of those age 65 or over.

Same-sex couples headed 23 households in 2010, up from the 14 counted in 2000.

=== 2000 census ===
As of the 2000 United States census there were 7,610 people, 2,847 households, and 2,078 families residing in the borough. The population density was 864.7 inhabitants per square mile (333.9/km^{2}). There were 2,940 housing units at an average density of 334.1 per square mile (129.0/km^{2}). The racial makeup of the borough was 95.55% White, 0.42% African American, 0.12% Native American, 2.19% Asian, 0.67% from other races, and 1.05% from two or more races. Hispanic or Latino of any race were 4.36% of the population.

There were 2,847 households, out of which 31.8% had children under the age of 18 living with them, 60.9% were married couples living together, 8.7% had a female householder with no husband present, and 27.0% were non-families. 21.9% of all households were made up of individuals, and 6.2% had someone living alone who was 65 years of age or older. The average household size was 2.63 and the average family size was 3.09.

In the borough the population was spread out, with 22.3% under the age of 18, 6.4% from 18 to 24, 34.3% from 25 to 44, 25.2% from 45 to 64, and 11.9% who were 65 years of age or older. The median age was 38 years. For every 100 females, there were 97.8 males. For every 100 females age 18 and over, there were 94.9 males.

The median income for a household in the borough was $67,885, and the median income for a family was $75,433. Males had a median income of $46,351 versus $36,607 for females. The per capita income for the borough was $27,736. 3.4% of the population and 2.0% of families were below the poverty line. Out of the total people living in poverty, 3.8% are under the age of 18 and 3.5% are 65 or older.

== Government ==
=== Local government ===
Bloomingdale is governed under the borough form of New Jersey municipal government, which is used in 218 municipalities (of the 564) statewide, making it the most common form of government in New Jersey. The governing body is comprised of a mayor and a borough council, with all positions elected at-large on a partisan basis as part of the November general election. A mayor is elected directly by the voters to a four-year term of office. The borough council includes six members elected to serve three-year terms on a staggered basis, with two seats coming up for election each year in a three-year cycle. The borough form of government used by Bloomingdale is a "weak mayor / strong council" government in which council members act as the legislative body with the mayor presiding at meetings and voting only in the event of a tie. The mayor can veto ordinances subject to an override by a two-thirds majority vote of the council. The mayor makes committee and liaison assignments for council members, and most appointments are made by the mayor with the advice and consent of the council.

As of 2026, the mayor of the Borough of Bloomingdale is Democrat John D'Amato, whose term of office ends December 31, 2026. Members of the Bloomingdale Borough Council are Council President Peyman "Ray" Yazdi (D, 2026), David F. Brockhurst (D, 2028), Dominic Catalano (D, 2026), John Graziano (D, 2027), Jennifer M. Hagin (D, 2028) and Evelyn M. Schubert (R, 2027).

Council President John D’Amato was selected to serve as acting mayor, filling the seat expiring in December 2023 that became vacant following the death of Jonathan Dunleavy in November 2020. In December 2021, after D'Amato was elected as mayor in the November 2021 general election, the borough council selected Dominic Catalano from a list of three candidates nominated by the Democratic municipal committee to fill the seat expiring in December 2023 that had been held by John D'Amato until he stepped down from office after being certified as mayor; Catalano served on an interim basis until the November 2022 general election, when voters chose him to serve the balance of the term.

=== Federal, state, and county representation ===
Bloomingdale is located in the 5th Congressional District and is part of New Jersey's 26th state legislative district.

For the 119th United States Congress, New Jersey's 5th congressional district is represented by Josh Gottheimer (D, Wyckoff). New Jersey is represented in the United States Senate by Democrats Cory Booker (Newark, term ends 2027) and Andy Kim (Moorestown, term ends 2031).

For the 2026–2027 session, the 26th legislative district of the New Jersey Legislature is represented in the State Senate by Joseph Pennacchio (R, Rockaway Township) and in the General Assembly by Brian Bergen (R, Denville Township) and Jay Webber (R, Morris Plains).

Passaic County is governed by a Board of County Commissioners, comprised of seven members who are elected at-large to staggered three-year terms office on a partisan basis, with two or three seats coming up for election each year as part of the November general election in a three-year cycle. At a reorganization meeting held in January, the board selects a Director and Deputy Director from among its members to serve for a one-year term. As of 2026, Passaic County's Commissioners are: Director Cassandra "Sandi" Lazzara (D), Little Falls, term as commissioner ends December 31, 2027; term as director ends 2026), Deputy Director Orlando Cruz (D, Paterson, term as commissioner and as deputy director ends 2026), Rodney DeVore (D, Paterson, 2027), Bruce James (D, Clifton, 2026) Michael Ramaglia (D, West Milford, 2028), Christina Schratz (D, Passaic, 2028) and Nick Veliky (D, Clifton, appointed to a term ending in 2027).

Constitutional officers, elected on a countywide basis, are County Clerk Danielle Ireland-Imhof (D, Hawthorne, 2028), Sheriff Thomas Adamo (D, Wayne, 2027) and Surrogate Zoila S. Cassanova (D, Wayne, 2026).

=== Highlands protection ===
In 2004, the New Jersey Legislature passed the Highlands Water Protection and Planning Act, which regulates the New Jersey Highlands region. Bloomingdale was included in the highlands preservation area and is subject to the rules of the act and the Highlands Water Protection and Planning Council, a division of the New Jersey Department of Environmental Protection. Some of the territory in the protected region is classified as being in the highlands preservation area, and thus subject to additional rules.

=== Politics ===
As of March 2011, there were a total of 4,993 registered voters in Bloomingdale, of which 1,333 (26.7% vs. 31.0% countywide) were registered as Democrats, 1,154 (23.1% vs. 18.7%) were registered as Republicans and 2,505 (50.2% vs. 50.3%) were registered as Unaffiliated. There was one voter registered to another party. Among the borough's 2010 Census population, 65.2% (vs. 53.2% in Passaic County) were registered to vote, including 82.7% of those ages 18 and over (vs. 70.8% countywide).

Gubernatorial election results for Bloomingdale
Year	Republican		Democratic		Third party(ies)	
Year	No.	%	No.	%	No.	%
2025	1,739	50.63%	1,681	48.94%	15	0.44%
2021	1,596	58.08%	1,119	40.72%	33	1.20%
2017	1,126	51.09%	1,016	46.10%	62	2.81%
2013	1,599	68.57%	697	29.89%	36	1.54%
2009	1,401	54.81%	934	36.54%	221	8.65%
2005	1,184	48.50%	1,173	48.05%	84	3.44%

In the 2012 presidential election, Republican Mitt Romney received 51.7% of the vote (1,849 cast), ahead of Democrat Barack Obama with 46.7% (1,670 votes), and other candidates with 1.6% (57 votes), among the 3,608 ballots cast by the borough's 5,215 registered voters (32 ballots were spoiled), for a turnout of 69.2%. In the 2008 presidential election, Republican John McCain received 2,077 votes (53.1% vs. 37.7% countywide), ahead of Democrat Barack Obama with 1,732 votes (44.3% vs. 58.8%) and other candidates with 50 votes (1.3% vs. 0.8%), among the 3,911 ballots cast by the borough's 5,159 registered voters, for a turnout of 75.8% (vs. 70.4% in Passaic County). In the 2004 presidential election, Republican George W. Bush received 2,078 votes (55.2% vs. 42.7% countywide), ahead of Democrat John Kerry with 1,603 votes (42.6% vs. 53.9%) and other candidates with 39 votes (1.0% vs. 0.7%), among the 3,767 ballots cast by the borough's 4,996 registered voters, for a turnout of 75.4% (vs. 69.3% in the whole county).

Presidential elections results
Year	Republican	Democratic	Third Parties
2024	54.7% 2,357	42.6% 1,836	2.6% 107
2020	51.6% 2,369	45.7% 2,098	2.7% 76
2016	54.5% 2,089	40.0% 1,533	4.3% 166
2012	51.7% 1,849	46.7% 1,670	1.6% 56
2008	53.1% 2,077	44.3% 1,732	1.3% 50
2004	55.2% 2,078	42.6% 1,603	1.0% 39

In the 2013 gubernatorial election, Republican Chris Christie received 68.6% of the vote (1,599 cast), ahead of Democrat Barbara Buono with 29.9% (697 votes), and other candidates with 1.5% (36 votes), among the 2,370 ballots cast by the borough's 5,219 registered voters (38 ballots were spoiled), for a turnout of 45.4%. In the 2009 gubernatorial election, Republican Chris Christie received 1,401 votes (54.3% vs. 43.2% countywide), ahead of Democrat Jon Corzine with 934 votes (36.2% vs. 50.8%), Independent Chris Daggett with 191 votes (7.4% vs. 3.8%) and other candidates with 30 votes (1.2% vs. 0.9%), among the 2,580 ballots cast by the borough's 4,932 registered voters, yielding a 52.3% turnout (vs. 42.7% in the county).

United States Senate election results for Bloomingdale1
Year	Republican		Democratic		Third party(ies)	
Year	No.	%	No.	%	No.	%
2024	2,151	52.27%	1,829	44.45%	135	3.28%
2018	1,619	51.20%	1,286	40.67%	257	8.13%
2012	1,625	50.33%	1,523	47.17%	81	2.51%
2006	1,459	54.22%	1,181	43.89%	51	1.90%

United States Senate election results for Bloomingdale2
Year	Republican		Democratic		Third party(ies)	
Year	No.	%	No.	%	No.	%
2020	2,197	49.53%	2,093	47.18%	146	3.29%
2014	1,107	50.46%	1,043	47.54%	44	2.01%
2013	774	56.70%	573	41.98%	18	1.32%
2008	1,840	51.58%	1,642	46.03%	85	2.38%

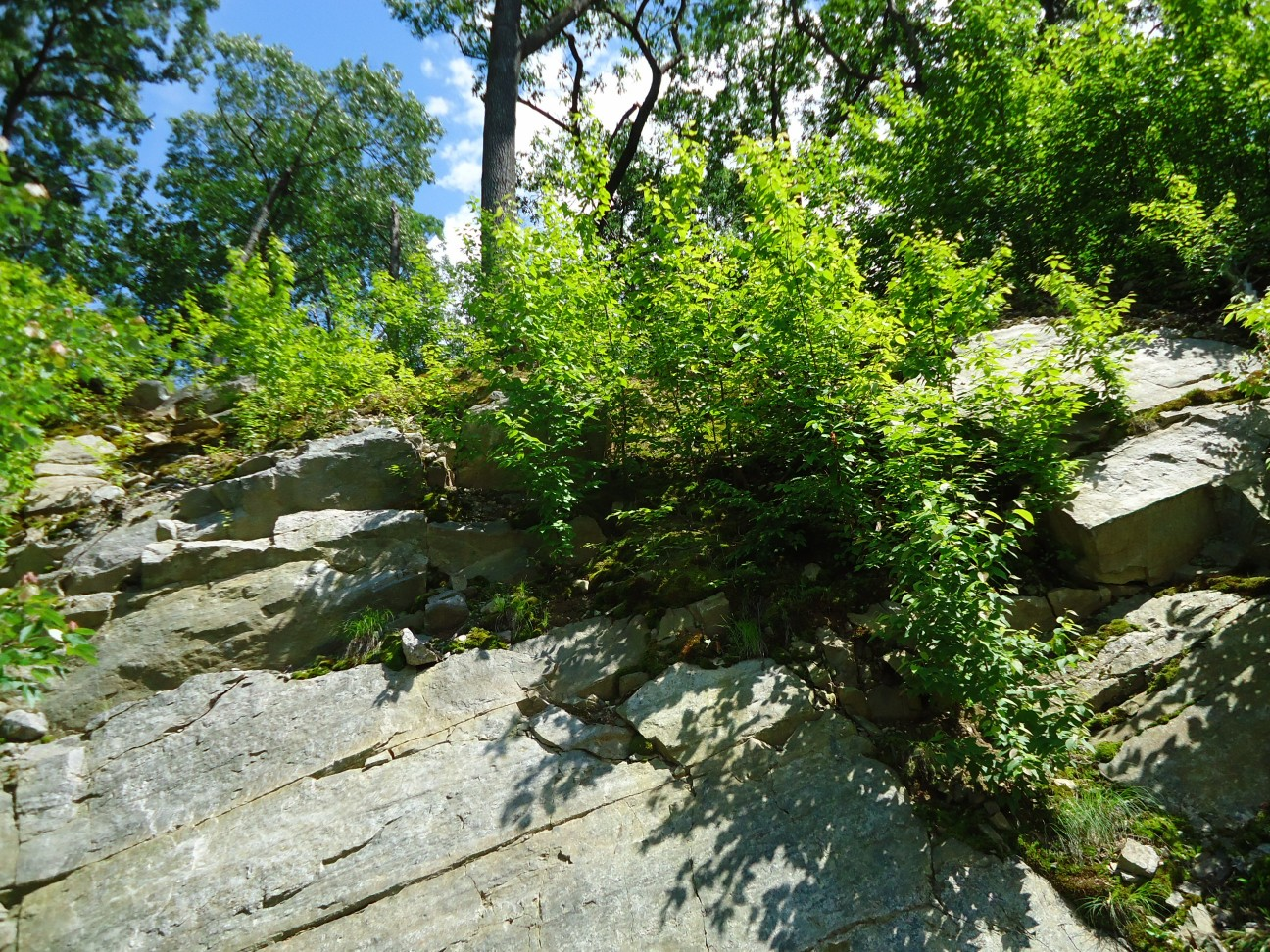
Shrubs and boulders on a hill overlooking Bloomingdale.

== Recreation ==
Parks in the borough include the 44-acre (18 ha) Mayor Dunleavy Memorial Park and parts of the 5,416-acre (2,192 ha) Norvin Green State Forest, which also includes portions of Ringwood and West Milford.

== Education ==
The Bloomingdale School District serves public school students in pre-kindergarten through eighth grade. As of the 2019–20 school year, the district, comprised of three schools, had an enrollment of 564 students and 44.8 classroom teachers (on an FTE basis), for a student–teacher ratio of 12.6:1. Schools in the district (with 2019–20 enrollment data from the National Center for Education Statistics) are Martha B. Day Elementary School with 142 students in grades Pre-K–1, Samuel R. Donald Elementary School with 173 students in grades 2–4 and Walter T. Bergen Middle School with 241 students in grades 5–8.

For ninth through twelfth grades, high school-aged students from Bloomingdale in public school attend Butler High School in the adjacent community of Butler in Morris County, as part of a sending/receiving relationship with the Butler Public Schools. As of the 2019–20 school year, the high school had an enrollment of 471 students and 38.3 classroom teachers (on an FTE basis), for a student–teacher ratio of 12.3:1.

== Transportation ==
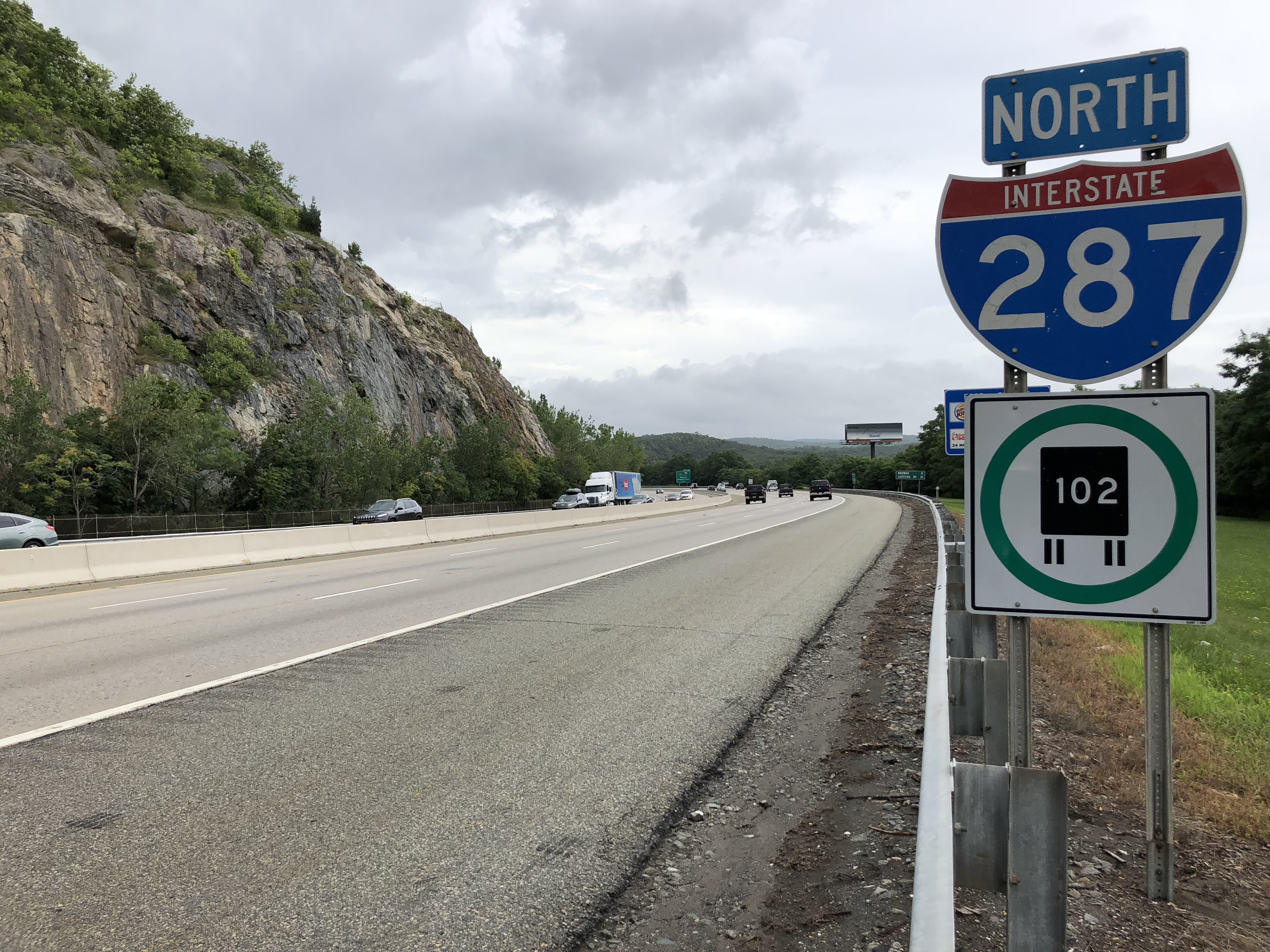
Interstate 287 northbound in Bloomingdale

=== Roads and highways ===
As of May 2010, the borough had a total of 29.54 miles (47.54 km) of roadways, of which 21.04 miles (33.86 km) were maintained by the municipality, 7.88 miles (12.68 km) by Passaic County and 0.62 miles (1.00 km) by the New Jersey Department of Transportation.

Interstate 287 is the most significant highway passing through Bloomingdale. However, there is no direct access to it within Bloomingdale, with the nearest interchanges being in adjacent towns. County Route 511 is the most significant road serving Bloomingdale directly.

=== Public transportation ===
Bloomingdale was served by the New York, Susquehanna and Western Railway commuter passenger service until 1966. NJ Transit provides bus transportation on the 194 route to the Port Authority Bus Terminal in New York City. In September 2012, as part of budget cuts, NJ Transit suspended service to Newark on the 75 line.

== Notable people ==
People who were born in, residents of, or otherwise closely associated with Bloomingdale include:

- Michael DuHaime (born 1974), campaign manager of Rudolph Giuliani's campaign for the 2008 Republican presidential nomination
- Wendy Larry (born 1955), former head coach of the Old Dominion Monarchs women's basketball team
- Tim O'Connor (1927–2018), character actor known for his prolific work in television, including Peyton Place
- Scott A. Spellmon (born 1963), 55th Chief of Engineers of the United States Army and the commanding general of the U.S. Army Corps of Engineers
