= Andrew Turzilli =

American gridiron football player (born 1991)

No. 84, 86
- Position: Wide receiver

Personal information
- Born: October 13, 1991 (age 35); Mesa, Arizona, U.S.
- Listed height: 6 ft 4 in (1.93 m)
- Listed weight: 195 lb (88 kg)

Career information
- High school: Butler (Butler, New Jersey)
- College: Kansas (2010–2013); Rutgers (2014)
- NFL draft: 2015: undrafted

Career history
- Tennessee Titans (2015)*; San Francisco 49ers (2015)*; Tennessee Titans (2015); Detroit Lions (2016–2017)*; New York Giants (2017)*; Hamilton Tiger-Cats (2018–2019)*
- * Offseason or practice squad member only

Career NFL statistics
- Receptions: 2
- Receiving yards: 25
- Stats at Pro Football Reference

Andrew Turzilli (born October 13, 1991) is an American former professional football player who was a wide receiver in the National Football League (NFL). He played college football for the Kansas Jayhawks before transferring to the Rutgers Scarlet Knights. He was signed by the Tennessee Titans as an undrafted free agent in 2015.

== Early life ==
Turzilli attended Butler High School, where he played both high school football as well as high school basketball. While playing football, he lettered for three seasons as a wide receiver and defensive back. After transferring to Butler as a junior he recorded 38 receptions for 685 yards and seven touchdowns in just five games. For that season he was named All-Conference. As a senior appeared in 12 games and recorded 54 receptions for 953 yards and 11 touchdowns. For the season, he was named All-State first-team, All-Daily Record, All-Conference, All-Area and All-Tri-State.

== College career ==
Turzilli then attended Kansas where he majored in American studies.

As a freshman in 2010, he redshirted. As a redshirt freshman in 2011, appeared in three games, recording three receptions for 37 yards. A redshirt sophomore in 2012, he appeared in all 12 games with four starts. He recorded 17 receptions for 287 yards. He was named Academic All-Big 12 second-team. In 2013 as a redshirt junior, he appeared in nine games with three starts. He recorded seven receptions for 167 yards with a touchdown. He was again named Academic All-Big 12 second-team. In May 2014, he graduated with a degree in American studies.

He then transferred to Rutgers University where he was immediately eligible to compete for the Scarlet Knights. As a redshirt senior in 2014 he appeared in 11 games with four starts. For the season he recorded 10 receptions for 347 yards and four touchdowns.

== Professional career ==
Pre-draft measurables
Height	Weight	40-yard dash	10-yard split	20-yard split	20-yard shuttle	Three-cone drill	Bench press
6 ft 4 1/3 in (1.94 m)	190 lb (86 kg)	4.44 s	1.53 s	2.70 s	4.34 s	6.96 s	12 reps
All values from Rutgers pro day.

=== Tennessee Titans (first stint) ===
After going unselected in the 2015 NFL draft, Turzilli was signed as an undrafted free agent by the Tennessee Titans on May 11, 2015. He was waived with an injury settlement on September 3.

=== San Francisco 49ers ===
He was then signed by the San Francisco 49ers to their practice squad on October 13.

=== Tennessee Titans (second stint) ===
On November 17, he was signed by the Titans to their active roster from the 49ers practice squad. Turzilli appeared in 3 games catching 2 passes for 25 yards on the season. On September 2, he was released by the Titans.

=== Detroit Lions ===
On December 20, 2016, Turzilli was signed to the Lions' practice squad. He signed a reserve/future contract with the Lions on January 9, 2017. He was waived by the Lions on May 11, 2017.

=== New York Giants ===
On August 14, 2017, Turzilli signed with the New York Giants. He was waived/injured on August 23, 2017, after suffering a hamstring injury and placed on injured reserve. He was released on August 27, 2017.
