= Butler High School (New Jersey) =

High school in Morris County, New Jersey, US

Location
- 38 Bartholdi Avenue; Butler, Morris County, New Jersey 07405; United States; 40.99816°N 74.33960°W

Information
- Type: Public high school
- Established: 1903
- School district: Butler Public Schools
- NCES School ID: 340252004166
- Principal: Rory Fitzgerald
- Faculty: 38.0 FTEs
- Grades: 9-12
- Enrollment: 482 (as of 2024–25)
- Student to teacher ratio: 12.7:1
- Colors: Royal blue and Gold
- Athletics conference: North Jersey Interscholastic Conference
- Team name: Bulldogs
- Website: bhs.butlerboe.org

Butler High School is a four-year public high school that serves students in ninth through twelfth grades from Butler, in Morris County, in the U.S. state of New Jersey, operating as the lone secondary school of the Butler Public Schools.

Students from Bloomingdale attend Butler High School as part of a sending/receiving relationship with the Bloomingdale School District. In 2020–21, more than 40% of the students in the high school came from Bloomingdale.

As of the 2024–25 school year, the school had an enrollment of 482 students and 38.0 classroom teachers (on an FTE basis), for a student–teacher ratio of 12.7:1. There were 116 students (24.1% of enrollment) eligible for free lunch and 18 (3.7% of students) eligible for reduced-cost lunch.

== History ==
Students from Butler had been sent to attend high school in Paterson before Butler High School was opened in 1903. From the time the school opened, the school served students from a 200-square-mile (520 km^{2}) area that included Jefferson Township, Kinnelon, Pequannock Township and Riverdale in Morris County, and Bloomingdale, Pompton Lakes, Ringwood, Wanaque and West Milford in Passaic County until they built their own schools or established alternate arrangements with other school districts.

Pompton Lakes withdrew in 1933 to open their high school. In September 1954, the Butler district notified its eight sending communities that growing enrollment of borough residents would mean that there would be no space available at Butler High School and that the local districts serving students from Passaic County communities and Pequannock Township would have to make alternate arrangements by 1958. While Pequannock Township, Ringwood and Wanaque met the 1958 deadline, West Milford left four years later, Kinnelon and Riverdale left with the opening of Kinnelon High School in 1962 and Jefferson Township ended their sending relationship with the opening of Jefferson Township High School in 1964.

The original building occupied by Butler High School was built in the late 1800s and soon expanded with an annex (Still existing, "Annex Building") constructed in 1916. The school then doubled its size with an addition parallel to Bartholdi Avenue in the mid 1930s. After sections of the original Butler High School facility caught fire in January 1963, with damage focused on the portion of the building constructed in 1897, the school was shut down for renovations. The gymnasium was unusable due to water damage caused during the fighting of the fire and physical education classes were held outside for the remainder of the school year. Several classrooms in the original 1888 building were also heavily damaged and that building was town down. The school day was increased and the freshmen and some sophomores began classes later in the morning. Trailers were used for the guidance offices, freeing space in the main building for classrooms. The "Art Building" was then built to the left of the original school and opened after 1964.

The "Art building" (as of 2011): four locker rooms, a gymnasium, cafeteria and kitchen, five bathrooms, nurse's office, athletic director's office, physics lab, forensic science, two art rooms, an English classroom, culinary arts, health room, photo lab, auxiliary gym, and library w/ media center. The "Main building" (as of 2011): Main and attendance offices, Principal and Vice Principal's offices, guidance offices, and academic offices. Band and choir room, auditorium, foreign language, history, mathematics, and English classrooms, and science laboratories. Also, an updated computer lab; TLC lab, and six bathrooms (two for the use of faculty) The "Annex building" (as of 2011): Butler Board of Education, student resource center, one marketing and financial classroom, and two computer labs: (Business and computer-animated design).

== Awards, recognition and rankings ==
The school was the 162nd-ranked public high school in New Jersey out of 339 schools statewide in New Jersey Monthly magazine's September 2014 cover story on the state's "Top Public High Schools", using a new ranking methodology. The school had been ranked 94th in the state of 328 schools in 2012, after being ranked 176th in 2010 out of 322 schools listed. The magazine ranked the school 123rd in 2008 out of 316 schools. The school was ranked 116th in the magazine's September 2006 issue, which surveyed 316 schools across the state. Schooldigger.com ranked the school as 224th out of 376 public high schools statewide in its 2010 rankings (an increase of 14 positions from the 2009 rank) which were based on the combined percentage of students classified as proficient or above proficient on the language arts literacy and mathematics components of the High School Proficiency Assessment (HSPA).

== Athletics ==
The Butler High School Bulldogs participate in the North Jersey Interscholastic Conference, which is comprised of small-enrollment schools in Bergen, Hudson, Morris and Passaic counties, and was created following a reorganization of sports leagues in Northern New Jersey by the New Jersey State Interscholastic Athletic Association (NJSIAA). Until the 2018–19 school year, the school had been part of the Northwest Jersey Athletic Conference, but shifted to the NJIC to compete against other smaller schools. Before the NJSIAA's 2010 realignment, the school had competed in the Northern Hills Conference an athletic conference that included public and private high schools in Essex, Morris and Passaic counties. With 374 students in grades 10–12, the school was classified by the NJSIAA for the 2019–20 school year as Group I for most athletic competition purposes, which included schools with an enrollment of 75 to 476 students in that grade range. The school was classified by the NJSIAA as Group I North for football for 2024–2026, which included schools with 254 to 474 students.

The girls field hockey team won the North II Group II state sectional championships in both 1978 and 1979. The team was the Group II co-champion in 1978 after a 1–1 tie in the finals against the two-time defending champion Haddonfield Memorial High School.

The football team won the NJSIAA North II Group II state sectional championship in 1982 and 1983, won the title in North II Group I in 1990 and 1994–1997, and won in North I Group I in 2018. The 1982 team finished the season with an 11–0 record after winning the North II Group II sectional championship game with a 23–7 win against James Caldwell High School. The 1983 team finished the season with an 11–0 record, and brought the program's winning streak to 24 consecutive games, after taking the North II Group II sectional title with a 16–8 victory against Hillside High School in the championship game. The team won the 1994 North II Group I title with a 35–21 victory in the championship game against New Providence High School. After winning the first two rounds of the 2018 NJSIAA playoffs by shutout, the team won the North I Group I state sectional championship with a 35–28 win against Park Ridge High School in the final game of the tournament.

The girls' basketball team won the 2003 North II Group I championship, defeating runner-up Glen Ridge High School 65–39. The team moved on to the Group I state championship, defeating Wildwood High School by 43–37 in the final.

The girls' soccer team won the 2002 North I Group I state sectional championship over Glen Ridge High School by a score of 2–1. In 2004 they made it to the finals again, defeating Glen Rock High School 1–0 in the final game of the tournament. The team won the sectional state championship again in 2005, with a 3–0 win over Midland Park High School.

== Administration ==
The school's principal is Rory Fitzgerald. His core administration team includes the two assistant principals.

== Notable alumni ==
- Loretta Ford (1920–2025, class of 1937), nurse who was the co-founder of the first nurse practitioner program
- Larry Hand (born 1940), defensive end and defensive tackle who played in the NFL for the Detroit Lions from 1965 to 1977
- Kirsten Kraa (1941–2020), painter and educator
- Chris Kreski (1962–2005), writer, biographer and screenwriter at MTV who worked on Remote Control, Beavis and Butt-Head and Celebrity Deathmatch
- Wendy Larry (born 1955), former head coach of the Old Dominion Lady Monarchs basketball team
- Harry L. Sears (1920–2002, class of 1937), lawyer and politician who served for 10 years in the New Jersey Legislature
- Scott A. Spellmon (born 1963, class of 1982), 55th Chief of Engineers of the United States Army and the commanding general of the U.S. Army Corps of Engineers
- Andrew Turzilli (born 1991), wide receiver who played in the NFL for the Tennessee Titans
- Arthur Vervaet (1913–1999), politician who served four terms in the New Jersey General Assembly

== Notable faculty ==
- George Kiick (1917–2002), American football fullback who played in the NFL for the Pittsburgh Steelers and was a football coach at Butler High School
