= Pompton mutiny =

1781 revolt of Continental Army troops

- Part of American Revolutionary War
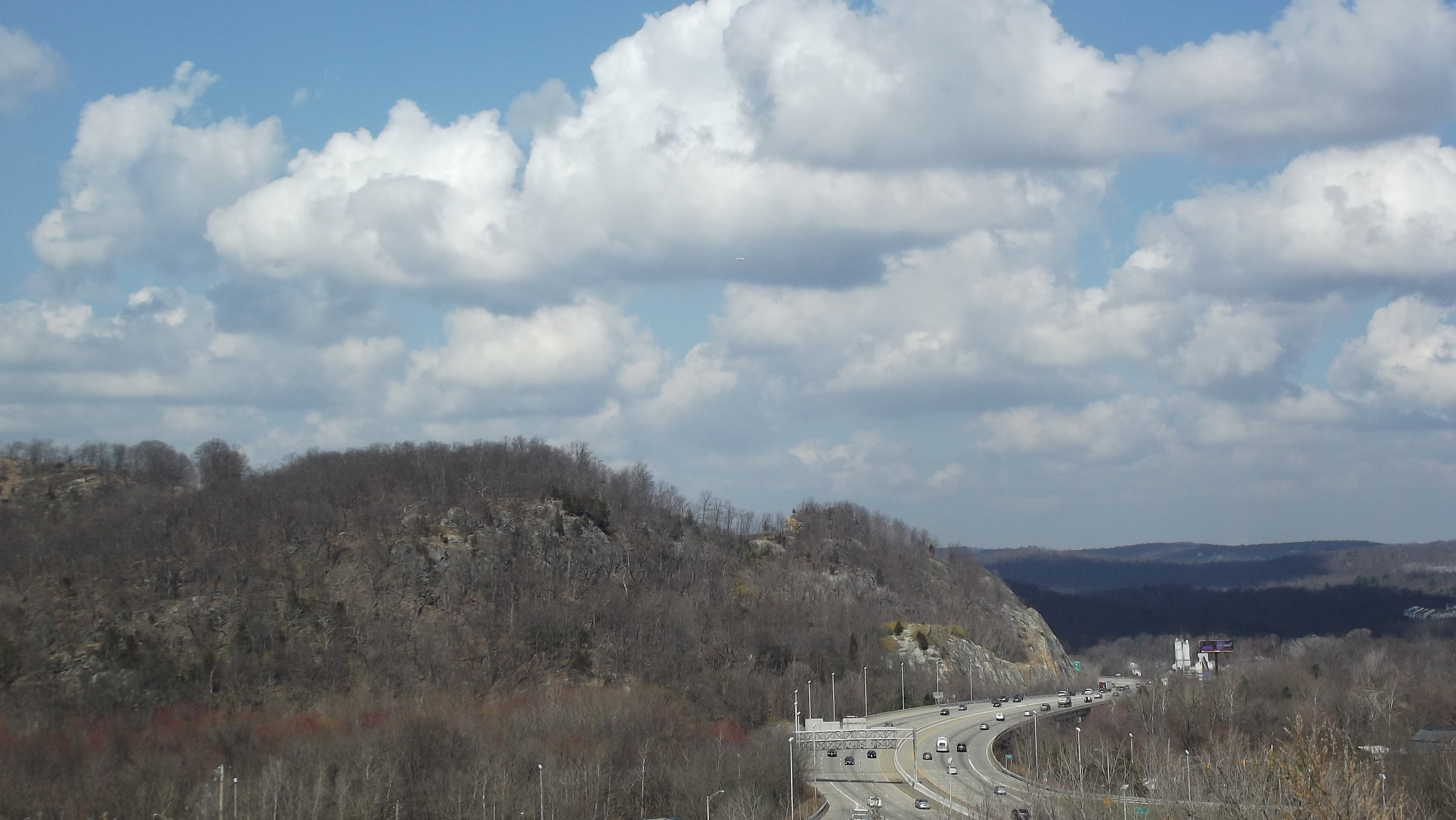
- Federal Hill
Date	January 20, 1781
Location	At or near Federal Hill (Bloomingdale, New Jersey)
Result	Mutiny suppressed

Commanders and leaders
David Gilmore (executed); John Tuttle (executed); George Grant	Israel Shreve

Units involved
- 2nd New Jersey Regiment

Strength
- c. 300 mutineers

Casualties and losses
None	None

The Pompton mutiny, also referred to as the Federal Hill Rebellion, was a revolt of Continental Army troops at Pompton Camp in what was then Pompton Township, New Jersey, present-day Bloomingdale, New Jersey, that occurred on January 20, 1781, beneath the command of Colonel Israel Shreve.

== History ==
Acting beneath the auspices of Sergeants David Gilmore, John Tuttle, George Grant and the disguisement of copious amounts of spirits, about 300 soldiers from the New Jersey Line of the Continental Army mutinied. These soldiers began to make their way to Trenton to issue demands for a redress of grievances to the Continental Congress, in echo of the actions of their brethren in the Pennsylvania Line who had successfully sought similar redress.

Alerted to this rogue faction by Pompton Camp Commander, Colonel Israel Shreve, who had in turn been informed by a woman whose name has been lost to history, Commander-in-Chief of the Continental Army George Washington "immediately ordered a Detachment [...] from West Point, under the Command of Major General Howe (Robert Howe) who surrounded the Mutineers by surprise in their Quarters, reduced them to unconditional submission & executed two of their Instigators on the spot—This has totally quelled the spirit of Mutiny, and every thing is now quiet."

Sergeants David Gilmore and John Tuttle were executed on the spot by a firing squad of 12 mutineers; Sergeant George Grant was issued a pardon based upon testimony by the troop body that he had advocated peaceable return to duty throughout the events of the rebellion. The firing squad was reported to have discharged their duty and their weapons tearfully in slaying their former officers. The entire body of troops was said to have been penitent and genuinely contrite in the time following the unsuccessful mutiny.

== Controversy ==
It is not readily apparent where Pompton Camp, as described in Washington's letters, was located. Historians are also divided on what path the rebels took towards Trenton and where the actual location of their submission and execution occurred.

21st-century historian Robert A. Mayers affirms that William Nelson, writing Paterson and Its Environs (Silk City) in the 1920s, was correct in his assertion that "In a thick wood, on the bleak and desolate summit of a rocky knob of the Ramapo Mountains, overlooking the Pompton Lakes Station on the New York, Susquehanna & Western Railroad, the hearty traveler can find two rude piles of weather-beaten field-stones. These are pointed out as marking the lonely, dishonored graves of the two Jersey mutineers." However, despite numerous attempts, no historian has been able to locate these graves since that era.

A historic marker in Bloomingdale, New Jersey reads: "Federal Hill Historic Site-The site of the Revolutionary war era Pompton Mutiny which occurred in the cold harsh winter of 1781. It was in the eastern valley overlooking Bloomingdale that an encampment of weary troops mutinied, consequently their two ringleaders were arrested, tried, and executed in the vicinity of what is now known as Union Avenue."

At times, Pompton Lakes, Bloomingdale, and Riverdale, New Jersey, have all laid claim to the site of these historic events.

== Modern day ==
In addition to the controversy over the site of the execution, at least one of those potential sites is privately held and in danger of development. The Federal Hill site in Bloomingdale was once held by DR Horton, who sought to build 256 homes there, without great consideration to historical or environmental preservation on the site and won a court order to force the development. Since then, the Meer Tract, which comprises a large portion of Federal Hill, has been purchased by Tilcon Industries, part of multinational mining conglomerate Anglo American plc, which plans to demolish and mine the land, against the outcry of environmental organizations and the Borough of Bloomingdale's historical opposition to development there.

The TV series Turn: Washington's Spies depicts a fictional portrayal of this mutiny and its aftermath in the fourth-season episode "Nightmare".

== Media coverage ==
- "Part 18: Mutiny!" (August 26, 2001 - NJ.com)
- "Back in the Day - June 2, 1976: Washington put down Bloomingdale mutiny" (June 13, 2011 - Northjersey.com)
- "A Tramp over Historic Ground" (May 5, 1879 - New York Times)
- "An Interesting Relic." (January 24, 1873 - Paterson Daily Press)
- "Back in 1781." (March 5, 1904 - The Chehalis Bee-Nugget)
- "For Today" (January 20, 1897 - Boston Evening Transcript)

== See also ==
- American Revolutionary War § Stalemate in the North. Places ' Pompton Mutiny ' in overall sequence and strategic context.
