= Franklin Silver Cornet Band =

The Franklin Silver Cornet Band, formed in 1856, is one of the oldest volunteer community bands in the United States. The band plays concerts throughout the summer months in Franklin, Pennsylvania as well as an indoor concert in Franklin's Barrow-Civic Theatre the day after Thanksgiving.

The Franklin Silver Cornet Band is the only non-military band to appear at both the Centennial and Bicentennial celebrations in Philadelphia. The band has made a number of other out-of-town appearances over the years, including performances at the Chautauqua Institution in Chautauqua, New York, Hersheypark, the Smithsonian Institution in Washington, DC, and the Henry Ford Museum.

The band incorporated in the summer of 1873 with seventeen members, including a carriage maker, a dentist, a well worker, and several Civil War veterans. John E. Butler, one of the veterans, had traveled on an orphan train to Princeton, Indiana, where he was a drummer boy with the 17th Indiana Brigade.

The first known director of the band was William Bell, who had been a cornet player in his native England. Later directors of the band included Charles Brassington, who led the band from the 1880s until 1918, Charles Ackley, who had led the "house" band at Cedar Point amusement park, and Edwin W. Frye, who served the longest in that capacity, retiring from active bandmastering in 2000.

The band faced occasional difficulties. Hanna's Hall, where the band's rooms were located, burned down in 1886. The band itself briefly disbanded in 1919 but was aided in revival by the remnants of the Rocky Grove Band. In the 1950s, the band was sometimes no larger than a dozen men, and in the 1960s, it entered a joint venture with the American Legion Band of Oil City.

The book Musical Service: The Life and Times of the Franklin Silver Cornet Band retells the band's history.
