= Federal Hill (Forest, Virginia) =

- U.S. National Register of Historic Places
- Virginia Landmarks Register
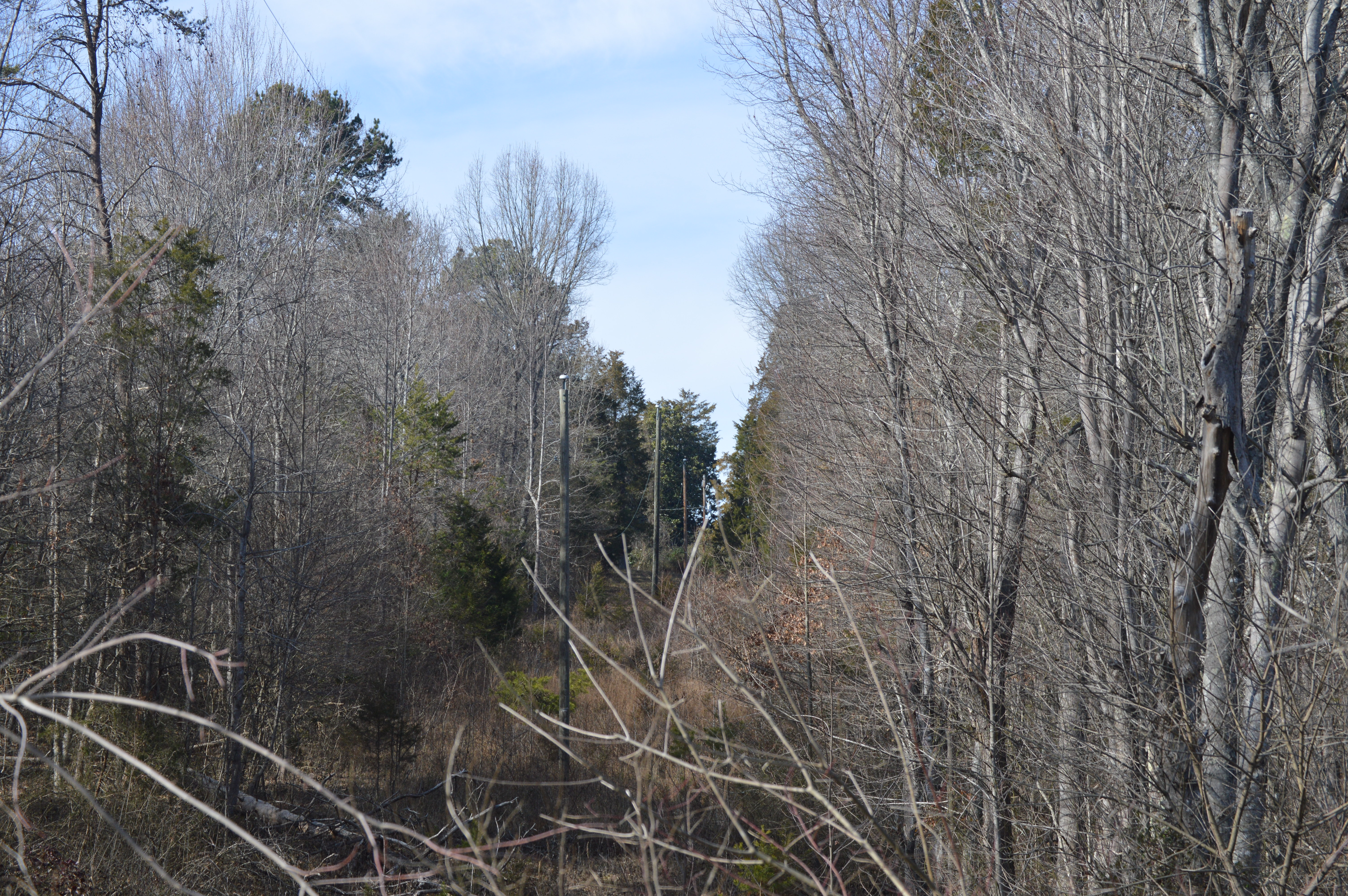
- Woodlands on the estate

- Location within Virginia Location within the United States
- Location: S of Forest on VA 623, near Forest, Virginia
- Coordinates: 37°18′37″N 79°17′04″W
- Area: 40 acres (16 ha)
- Built: 1772, 1782
- NRHP reference No.: 82004547
- VLR No.: 015-0003

Significant dates
- Added to NRHP: September 9, 1982
- Designated VLR: May 18, 1982

Federal Hill is a three part, Palladian-type dwelling constructed in 1782 and located in Campbell County, Virginia. The original owner of Federal Hill, James Steptoe, served as the second clerk of Bedford County from 1772 to 1826. In addition to fifty-four years of service as the Clerk of Bedford County, Steptoe also remained a lifelong friend of Thomas Jefferson. Furthermore, Jefferson's unique, Palladian architectural influence can be observed in Steptoe's Federal Hill. Following Steptoe's death in 1826, Federal Hill continued to be occupied by the Steptoe family until 1850 when it was sold to the Carter Family of Fredericksburg. Today, the structure remains in private ownership as an occupied residence.

== Architectural Analysis ==
Federal Hill's plan is modeled after 18th century Palladian architecture adapted to Virginia's three part house style. The main building consists of a 2 1/2-story, wood-frame, weatherboarded structure with a pedimented gable roof. The main entrance to the structure is located on the west elevation. The entrance consists of the original paneled double doors framed by a two-part architrave trim. Sheltering the main entrance is a two-tier pedimented portico. The present two-tiered, pedimented portico reflects a 1930s rebuilding.

On the first floor, an entry hall and the main stair frame the entrance to the building. The first floor also contains a rear assembly hall, a flanking parlor, and a dining room. The assembly hall is the most elaborate room in the house, featuring a double-paneled wainscot and a molded chair rail. Additionally, the assembly hall is framed by a dentiled cornice that runs the perimeter of the room. The dining room and the parlor also contain similar, elaborate patterns with dentil cornice running the perimeter of the rooms and a Federal-style mantel ornamenting the fireplace. The doors and windows of the lower floor are framed by molded architraves. In 1955–1956, a brick kitchen was added to the structure.

The second floor is lined by two hallways, one running north and south and the other east and west. A myriad of bedrooms is located on the second floor that are simpler in style than the lower level. The hallways and bedchambers are lined with wainscoting topped by molded chair rails. The second-floor mantels have plain architrave and the architrave in the halls are similar to the first floor architraves.

Federal Hill rests on a small hill against the rolling countryside of Campbell county. An early clerk's office remains south of the main house. This building was presumably built by James Steptoe in 1772 following his appointment to the position of county clerk. The physical features of the office are as follows: a 1 1/2-story, wood-frame, weatherboarded building covered by a gable roof with an exterior brick chimney laid in Flemish bond with rodded joints. In the 20th century, a smokehouse was added to the property, east of the main building.

== Historical background ==
James Steptoe was born at Hominy Hall, Westmoreland County, on July 16, 1750. When he was around twenty years old, Steptoe attended the College of William and Mary; at this location, Steptoe became acquainted with Thomas Jefferson. The friendship formed during their college days would grow to last a lifetime. Under Jefferson's influence, Secretary of the Colony Thomas Nelson appointed Steptoe as the second clerk of Bedford County on January 17, 1772.

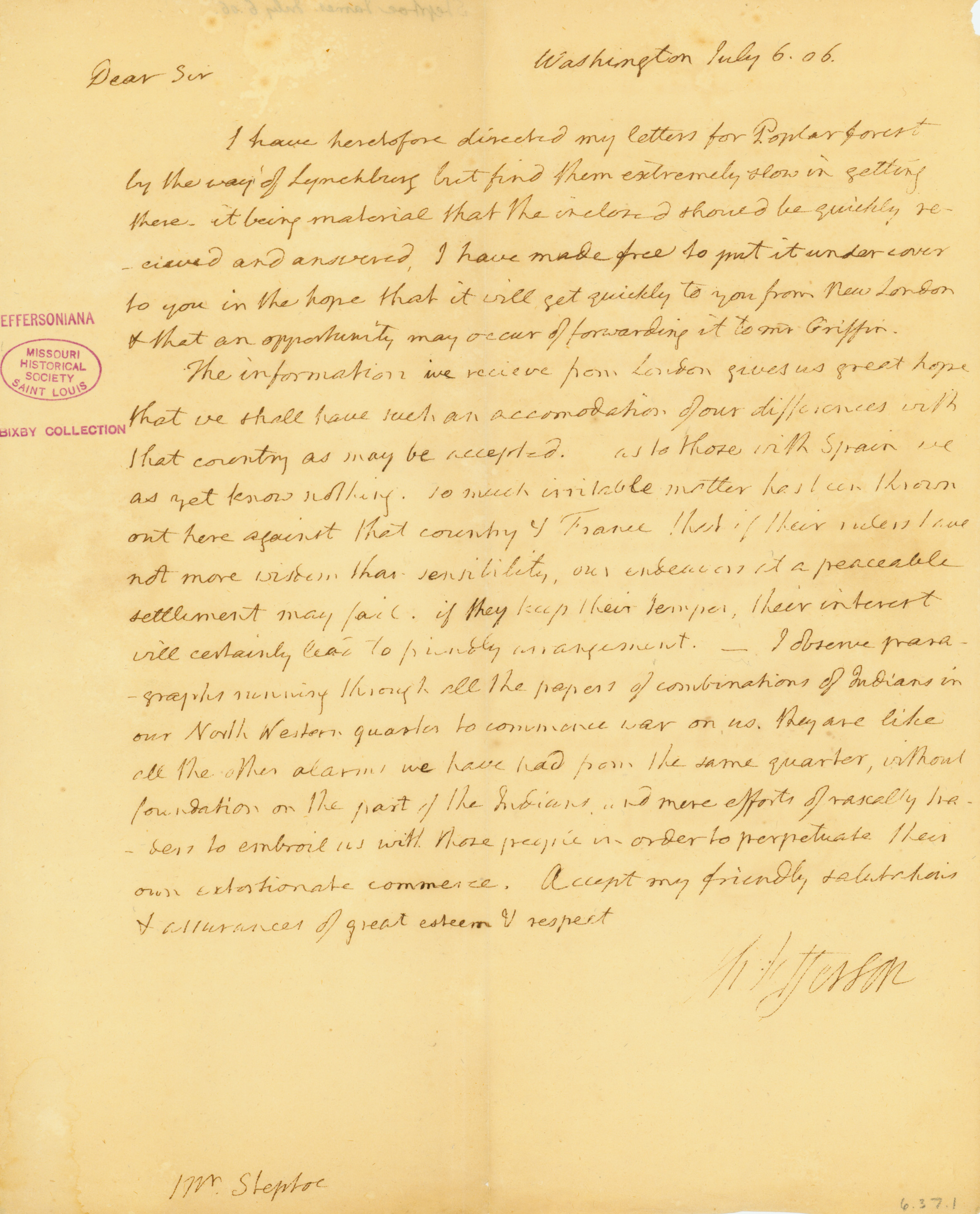
Thomas Jefferson and James Steptoe often corresponded through letters.

Despite Steptoe's appointment, the social conditions and sparsely settled wilderness of Bedford county prompted Steptoe to seek another appointment to a more settled region. Frederick Johnston explains in Memorials of Old Virginia Clerks that "the population was sparse, and the people plain and generally uneducated—a very different state of society from that which James Steptoe had been accustomed to." For this reason, Steptoe beseeched his friend Jefferson to find him a new position. Jefferson, however, urged Steptoe to remain in Virginia, assuring him that the state would improve and that he would be spending more time in the area (Jefferson had recently purchased Poplar Forest). Steptoe remained in Bedford County and became a respected member of the local community. In 1781, Steptoe married Frances Callaway, the daughter of Col. James Callaway. The Nomination Form for the National Register of Historic Places for Federal Hill reports that "marriage must have made life on the frontier more agreeable to Steptoe, since shortly thereafter he was engaged in building a new dwelling house for his bride." This dwelling would become known as Federal Hill.

The Palladian style of Federal Hill represents a tangible effect of Jefferson's influence on Steptoe. Additionally, Federal Hill is constructed of wood, rather than brick - the material advocated by Jefferson. After their college days, Jefferson and Steptoe continued to correspond through letters for nearly thirty years. Additional evidence of the strong friendship shared between the two gentlemen is contained within a portrait of Steptoe which also displays a portrait of Jefferson in the background. Federal Hill's most distinguished visitor was Thomas Jefferson, who visited the location several times according to their correspondence.

In 1826, James Steptoe died at the age of seventy-six. Federal Hill passes to his eldest son, James C. Steptoe who also succeeded his father as clerk of Bedford County from February 1820 to October 1827. James Steptoe was survived by nine children, five sons and four daughters.

== Calloway-Steptoe Cemetery ==
The property of Federal Hill is also home to the Calloway-Steptoe Cemetery, which serves as the final resting place for several prominent area settlers and their descendants. Col. William Calloway is buried at this location, along with his son-in-law James Steptoe. The plot covers one fourth of an acre of ground and is surrounded by a four-foot wall. A large portion of the graves are marked with marble stone.
