= Federal Hill (Bloomingdale, New Jersey) =

Federal Hill is a ridge in New Jersey Highlands, located in Bloomingdale

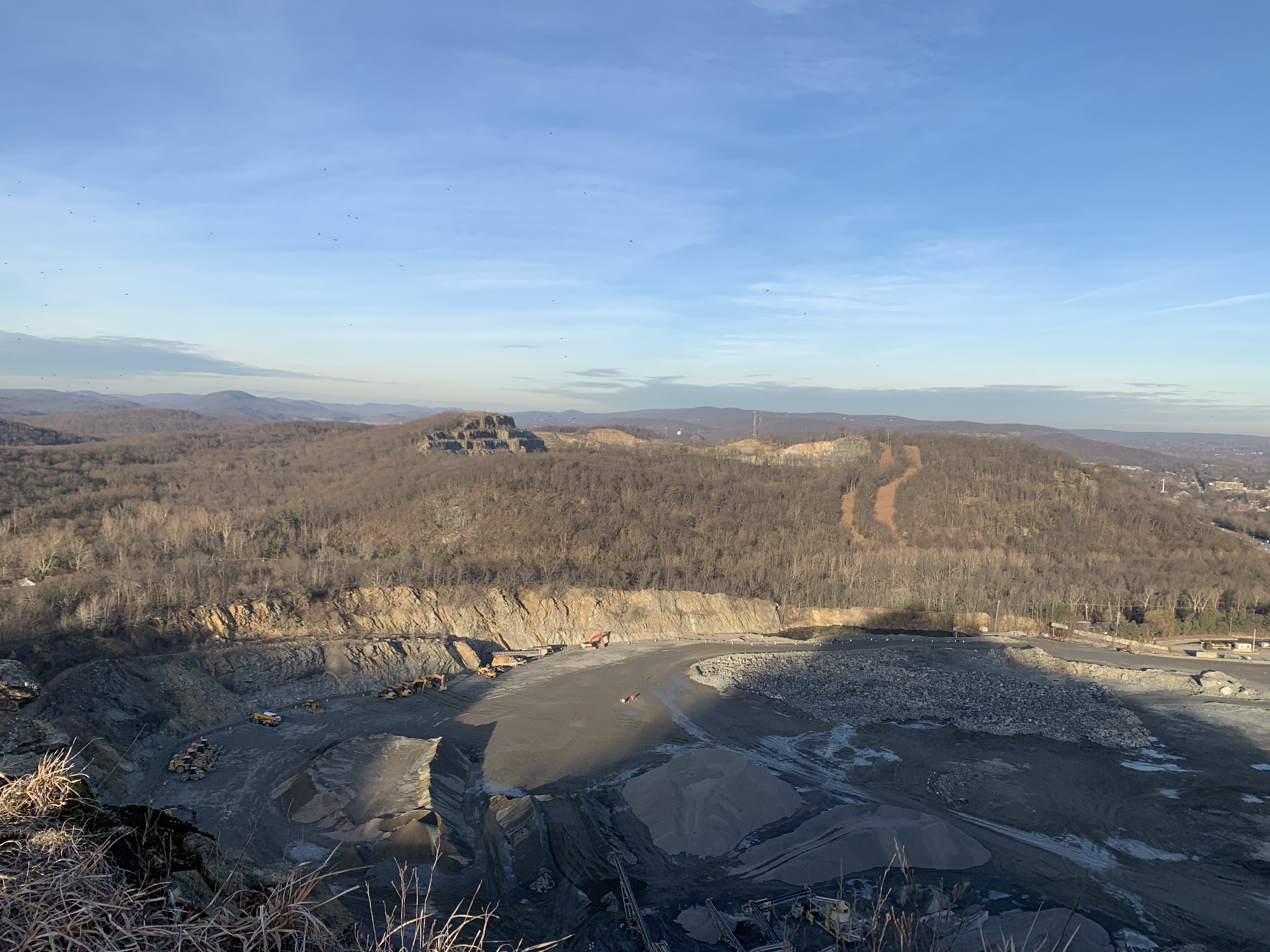
- Federal Hill seen from Riverdale, NJ

Highest point
- Elevation: ≈400 feet (120 m)
- Coordinates: 41.004711°N 74.310524°W

Geography
- Location within Passaic County, New Jersey Location within New Jersey Location within the United States
- Parent range: New Jersey Highlands

Federal Hill is a ridge nestled in the foothills of the New Jersey Highlands. It is located in the town of Bloomingdale in Passaic County, in the U.S. state of New Jersey.

== Geography ==
The hill is in the northern part of the state, in the New Jersey Highlands region, which is known for its rugged terrain, forests, and lakes. The ridgeline rises approximately 400 feet (120 m) above sea level, and is surrounded by other rugged hills and ridges, including Pompton Mountain and the Ramapo Mountains to the west. Following a generally northeastern course, Federal Hill and the NJ Highlands area are part of the same orogen as the Appalachian Mountains further west in the state.

The area is part of the Passaic River watershed, which collects water from a number of NJ highlands streams and lakes in the region. The Pompton River, which flows northward from the Ramapo Mountains, passes through the valley to the east of Federal Hill and provided water power for mills and other industries in the area. The Pequannock River also runs south of the ridge and is a popular destination for fishing.

== History ==
=== Revolutionary War ===
The ridge has been referenced as having served as part of a beacon network, consisting of a series of signal stations located at strategic points along the coast and on high ground, where fires could be lit and seen from a great distance. Set up by George Washington's Continental Army, the "Blue Hills Beacons" were used by both sides and played an important role in many key battles and campaigns, including the Battle of Long Island and the Siege of Boston.

The area was the site of the Pompton Mutiny, an insurrection of American soldiers in the winter of 1781. Caused by a number of grievances, including lack of pay, poor living conditions, and a lack of provisions, the soldiers, who were mostly from New Jersey and Pennsylvania, mutinied against their officers and demanded better treatment and payment. The mutiny was later solved through negotiations, however some perpetrators were later prosecuted and punished for their actions on Federal Hill.

=== Contemporary history ===
In the twentieth century, the Amerika-Deutscher Volksbund, or German-American Bund as it is commonly referred to, constructed a youth camp on Federal Hill called Camp Bergwald. The camp was active during the interwar period, amidst a resurgence in German nationalism in the United States due to Adolf Hitler's ascent to power in Germany in 1934. Activities of the German-American Bund continued there until American involvement in World War II in 1941, when it was shut down by the FBI.

The area has also been the site of the Riverdale Quarry, a granite gneiss quarry that has been in operation since the early 1900s owned by Tilcon. Producing crushed stone and other materials for construction, it has been an important source of jobs and economic activity in the region for over 100 years. Stone from the quarry on Federal Hill has provided rock for the entrance steps and atriums of several national landmarks in Washington, D.C.
