= Butler, New Jersey =

Borough in Morris County, New Jersey, US

- Borough
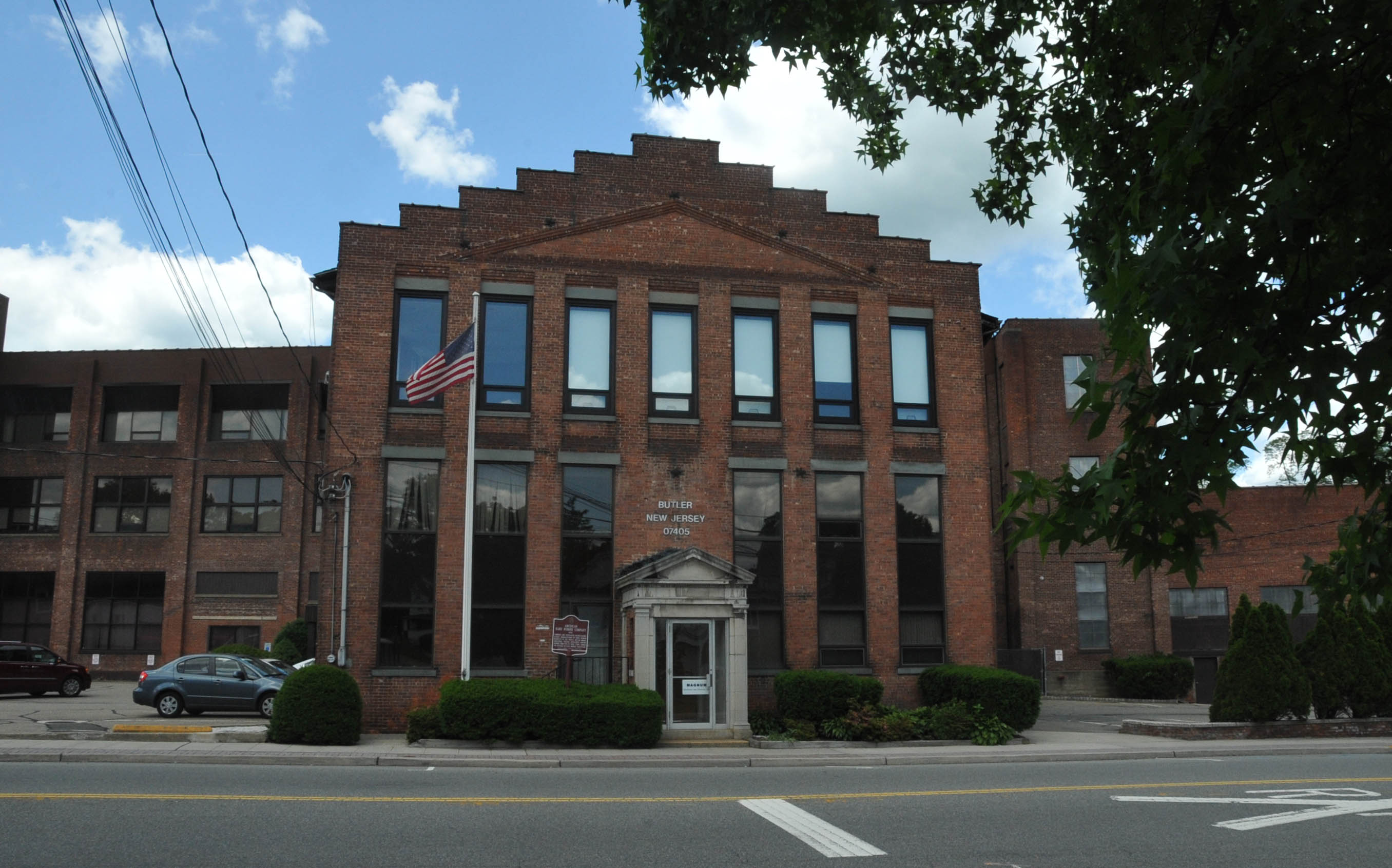
- American Hard Rubber Company

- Seal

- Location of Butler in Morris County highlighted and circled in red (right). Inset map: Location of Morris County in New Jersey highlighted in orange (left).

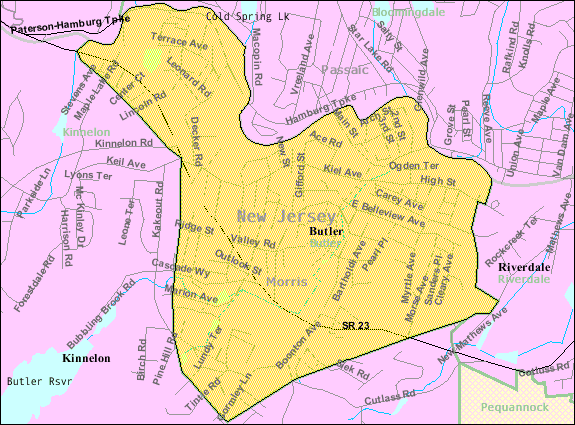
- Census Bureau map of Butler, New Jersey

- Location in Morris County Location in New Jersey Location in the United States
- Coordinates: 40.997768°N 74.347003°W
- Country: United States
- State: New Jersey
- County: Morris
- Incorporated: March 13, 1901
- Named after: Richard Butler

Government
  - Type: Borough
  - Body: Borough Council
  - Mayor: Ryan Martinez (R, term ends December 31, 2026)
  - Administrator: Matthew Guilder
  - Municipal clerk: Brandi Greco

Area
  - Total: 2.06 sq mi (5.34 km^{2})
  - Land: 2.03 sq mi (5.27 km^{2})
  - Water: 0.027 sq mi (0.07 km^{2}) 1.31%
  - Rank: 410th of 565 in state 36th of 39 in county
- Elevation: 456 ft (139 m)

Population (2020)
  - Total: 8,047
  - Estimate (2023): 8,133
  - Rank: 291st of 565 in state 24th of 39 in county
  - Density: 3,956.2/sq mi (1,527.5/km^{2})
  - Rank: 160th of 565 in state 5th of 39 in county
- Time zone: UTC−05:00 (Eastern (EST))
  - Summer (DST): UTC−04:00 (Eastern (EDT))
- ZIP Code: 07405
- Area code: 973
- FIPS code: 3402709040
- GNIS feature ID: 0885175
- Website: www.butlerborough.com

Butler is a borough in Morris County, in the U.S. state of New Jersey. As of the 2020 United States census, the borough's population was 8,047, an increase of 508 (+6.7%) from the 2010 census count of 7,539, which in turn reflected an increase of 119 (+1.6%) from the 7,420 counted in the 2000 census.

Butler was incorporated as a borough by an act of the New Jersey Legislature on March 13, 1901, from portions of Pequannock Township.

== History ==
The area now known as Butler was originally called "West Bloomingdale" and was sparsely populated. Water power brought manufacturing entities to the area. In 1857, The Pequannock Valley Paper Company moved from Bergen County and in 1868 the Newbrough Hard Rubber Company built a factory, both based along the Pequannock River. These were two significant economic entities that contributed to the growth of the borough. In 1871, the New Jersey Midland Railroad extended track through Butler from Paterson, making an important transportation connection for both passengers and freight. The northern terminus for the New York, Susquehanna and Western Railway's passenger service was located at Butler until 1966. The railroad still carries freight through Butler.

Main Street of Butler, New Jersey in approximately 1905

The growing community was given the name "Butler" in 1881 after Richard Butler, who had taken ownership of the Hard Rubber Company. A Post Office was established and a larger railroad station was built. This station has been the Borough Museum since 1977. The Hard Rubber Company eventually merged with other businesses and became the American Hard Rubber Company in 1898. A "Soft" Rubber Company built a factory just along Main Street. The borough continued to grow as other factories and supporting businesses were established. The population in 1920 was 2,265 people. By 1950, it was 4,063.

Ruins of Operahouse fire in Butler NJ, 1906

Butler's largest fire began just after midnight, February 26, 1957, when one of the nation's largest rubber reclaiming mills (Pequanoc Rubber Company on Main Street) was destroyed by a blaze estimated to have caused a loss of as much as $3 million (equivalent to $34.4 million in 2025). The mill occupied the site on upper Main Street, an irregular shaped complex 600 feet by 300 feet and three to four stories high; it produced over 100 tons of reusable sheet rubber daily from 200 tons of scrap. One Butler Heights resident remembers the fire being so bright she could read a newspaper in her yard at 3 am at a distance of a mile. The glow reportedly was visible for 100 miles, mutual aid response was required by volunteer fire companies from a dozen nearby fire companies.

Numerous organizations exist in town and, along with the neighboring towns of Kinnelon and Bloomingdale, many "Tri-Boro" organizations serve the area, including the local Little League & Volunteer First Aid Squad.

Butler was the location of a health resort run by Benedict Lust called "Yungborn" that opened on September 15, 1896.

== Geography ==
According to the United States Census Bureau, the borough had a total area of 2.06 square miles (5.34 km^{2}), including 2.03 square miles (5.27 km^{2}) of land and 0.03 square miles (0.07 km^{2}) of water (1.31%).

The borough borders the municipalities of Kinnelon and Riverdale in Morris County; and both Bloomingdale and West Milford in Passaic County.

== Demographics ==
Historical population
Census	Pop.	Note	%±
1910	2,265		—
1920	2,886		27.4%
1930	3,392		17.5%
1940	3,351		−1.2%
1950	4,050		20.9%
1960	5,414		33.7%
1970	7,051		30.2%
1980	7,616		8.0%
1990	7,392		−2.9%
2000	7,420		0.4%
2010	7,539		1.6%
2020	8,047		6.7%
2023 (est.)	8,133	▲	1.1%
Population sources: 1910–1920; 1910 1910–1930; 1940–2020 2000; 2010 2020

=== 2020 census ===
As of the 2020 census, Butler had a population of 8,047. The median age was 42.5 years. 19.1% of residents were under the age of 18 and 16.7% of residents were 65 years of age or older. For every 100 females there were 98.5 males, and for every 100 females age 18 and over there were 95.8 males age 18 and over.

100.0% of residents lived in urban areas, while 0.0% lived in rural areas.

There were 3,258 households in Butler, of which 27.3% had children under the age of 18 living in them. Of all households, 48.7% were married-couple households, 18.6% were households with a male householder and no spouse or partner present, and 25.3% were households with a female householder and no spouse or partner present. About 28.4% of all households were made up of individuals and 11.1% had someone living alone who was 65 years of age or older.

There were 3,403 housing units, of which 4.3% were vacant. The homeowner vacancy rate was 1.6% and the rental vacancy rate was 3.9%.

Racial composition as of the 2020 census
Race	Number	Percent
White	6,242	77.6%
Black or African American	141	1.8%
American Indian and Alaska Native	39	0.5%
Asian	287	3.6%
Native Hawaiian and Other Pacific Islander	0	0.0%
Some other race	595	7.4%
Two or more races	743	9.2%
Hispanic or Latino (of any race)	1,409	17.5%

=== 2010 census ===
The 2010 United States census counted 7,539 people, 3,031 households, and 1,976 families in the borough. The population density was 3,703.2 per square mile (1,429.8/km^{2}). There were 3,169 housing units at an average density of 1,556.6 per square mile (601.0/km^{2}). The racial makeup was 88.95% (6,706) White, 1.11% (84) Black or African American, 0.16% (12) Native American, 3.02% (228) Asian, 0.00% (0) Pacific Islander, 4.95% (373) from other races, and 1.80% (136) from two or more races. Hispanic or Latino of any race were 11.41% (860) of the population.

Of the 3,031 households, 28.3% had children under the age of 18; 50.8% were married couples living together; 9.9% had a female householder with no husband present and 34.8% were non-families. Of all households, 28.3% were made up of individuals and 9.9% had someone living alone who was 65 years of age or older. The average household size was 2.48 and the average family size was 3.06.

20.7% of the population were under the age of 18, 6.4% from 18 to 24, 31.6% from 25 to 44, 28.1% from 45 to 64, and 13.2% who were 65 years of age or older. The median age was 40.2 years. For every 100 females, the population had 100.7 males. For every 100 females ages 18 and older there were 99.6 males.

The Census Bureau's 2006–2010 American Community Survey showed that (in 2010 inflation-adjusted dollars) median household income was $78,614 (with a margin of error of +/− $5,375) and the median family income was $102,435 (+/− $7,072). Males had a median income of $69,407 (+/− $4,399) versus $46,286 (+/− $4,815) for females. The per capita income for the borough was $36,678 (+/− $3,263). About 3.2% of families and 3.4% of the population were below the poverty line, including 4.6% of those under age 18 and 1.3% of those age 65 or over.

=== 2000 census ===
As of the 2000 United States census there were 7,420 people, 2,868 households, and 2,024 families residing in the borough. The population density was 3,568.9 inhabitants per square mile (1,378.0/km^{2}). There were 2,923 housing units at an average density of 1,405.9 per square mile (542.8/km^{2}). The racial makeup of the borough was 94.89% White, 0.62% African American, 0.20% Native American, 1.85% Asian, 0.01% Pacific Islander, 1.48% from other races, and 0.94% from two or more races. Hispanic or Latino of any race were 5.11% of the population.

There were 2,868 households, out of which 30.6% had children under the age of 18 living with them, 57.8% were married couples living together, 9.4% had a female householder with no husband present, and 29.4% were non-families. 24.1% of all households were made up of individuals, and 9.4% had someone living alone who was 65 years of age or older. The average household size was 2.58 and the average family size was 3.09.

In the borough the population was spread out, with 21.7% under the age of 18, 7.2% from 18 to 24, 33.8% from 25 to 44, 24.2% from 45 to 64, and 13.2% who were 65 years of age or older. The median age was 38 years. For every 100 females, there were 97.1 males. For every 100 females age 18 and over, there were 94.7 males.

The median income for a household in the borough was $57,455, and the median income for a family was $66,199. Males had a median income of $45,975 versus $35,815 for females. The per capita income for the borough was $27,113. About 2.5% of families and 5.0% of the population were below the poverty line, including 4.2% of those under age 18 and 8.4% of those age 65 or over.

== Government ==
=== Local government ===
Butler is governed under the borough form of New Jersey municipal government, which is used in 218 municipalities (of the 564) statewide, making it the most common form of government in New Jersey. The governing body is comprised of the mayor and the borough council, with all positions elected at-large on a partisan basis as part of the November general election. The mayor is elected directly by the voters to a four-year term of office. The borough council includes six members elected to serve three-year terms on a staggered basis, with two seats coming up for election each year in a three-year cycle. The borough form of government used by Butler is a "weak mayor / strong council" government in which council members act as the legislative body with the mayor presiding at meetings and voting only in the event of a tie. The mayor can veto ordinances subject to an override by a two-thirds majority vote of the council. The mayor makes committee and liaison assignments for council members, and most appointments are made by the mayor with the advice and consent of the council.

As of 2026, the mayor of Butler is Republican Ryan Martinez, whose term of office ends December 31, 2026. Members of the Borough Council are Council President Raymond Verdonik (R, 2026), Alexander Calvi (R, 2028), Jose Guzman (R, 2027), Michael MacDonald (R, 2028), Robert H. Meier (R, 2027) and Marc Piccirillo (R, 2026).

=== Federal, state and county representation ===
Butler is located in the 11th Congressional District and is part of New Jersey's 25th state legislative district.

For the 119th United States Congress, New Jersey's 11th congressional district is represented by Analilia Mejia (D, Glen Ridge) who was elected in a 2026 special election to serve for the remainder of the Congress following the resignation Mikie Sherrill (D, Montclair), who was elected Governor of New Jersey in 2025. New Jersey is represented in the United States Senate by Democrats Cory Booker (Newark, term ends 2027) and Andy Kim (Moorestown, term ends 2031).

For the 2026–2027 session, the 25th legislative district of the New Jersey Legislature is represented in the State Senate by Anthony M. Bucco (R, Boonton Township) and in the General Assembly by Aura K. Dunn (R, Mendham Borough) and Marisa Sweeney (D, Morristown).

Morris County is governed by a Board of County Commissioners comprised of seven members who are elected at-large in partisan elections to three-year terms on a staggered basis, with either one or three seats up for election each year as part of the November general election. Actual day-to-day operation of departments is supervised by County Administrator Deena Leary.

As of 2026, Morris County's Commissioners (with all terms ending December 31) are Director Stephen H. Shaw (R, Mountain Lakes, 2027), Deputy Director John Krickus (R, Washington Township, 2027), Douglas Cabana (R, Boonton Township, 2028), Thomas J. Mastrangelo (R, Montville, 2028), Christine Myers (R, Harding Township, 2028), Tayfun Selen (R, Chatham Township, 2026), and Deborah Smith (R, Denville Township, 2027).

The county's constitutional officers are County Clerk Ann F. Grossi (R, Parsippany–Troy Hills, 2028), Sheriff James M. Gannon (R, Boonton Township, 2025) and Surrogate Heather Darling (R, Roxbury, 2029).

=== Politics ===
United States presidential election results for Butler 2024 2020 2016 2012 2008 2004
Year	Republican		Democratic		Third party(ies)	
Year	No.	%	No.	%	No.	%
2024	2,545	59.60%	1,657	38.81%	68	1.59%
2020	2,451	55.40%	1,918	43.35%	55	1.24%
2016	2,112	58.99%	1,333	37.23%	135	3.77%
2012	1,811	55.13%	1,430	43.53%	44	1.34%
2008	1,968	55.27%	1,561	43.84%	32	0.90%
2004	1,986	57.70%	1,430	41.55%	26	0.76%

As of March 2011, there were a total of 4,551 registered voters in Butler, of which 863 (19.0%) were registered as Democrats, 1,458 (32.0%) were registered as Republicans and 2,224 (48.9%) were registered as Unaffiliated. There were 6 voters registered as Libertarians or Greens.

In the 2012 presidential election, Republican Mitt Romney received 55.1% of the vote (1,811 cast), ahead of Democrat Barack Obama with 43.5% (1,430 votes), and other candidates with 1.3% (44 votes), among the 3,302 ballots cast by the borough's 4,774 registered voters (17 ballots were spoiled), for a turnout of 69.2%. In the 2008 presidential election, Republican John McCain received 55.1% of the vote (1,968 cast), ahead of Democrat Barack Obama with 43.7% (1,561 votes) and other candidates with 0.9% (32 votes), among the 3,573 ballots cast by the borough's 4,759 registered voters, for a turnout of 75.1%. In the 2004 presidential election, Republican George W. Bush received 57.4% of the vote (1,986 ballots cast), outpolling Democrat John Kerry with 41.4% (1,430 votes) and other candidates with 0.5% (26 votes), among the 3,458 ballots cast by the borough's 4,822 registered voters, for a turnout percentage of 71.7.

Gubernatorial election results for Butler
Year	Republican		Democratic		Third party(ies)	
Year	No.	%	No.	%	No.	%
2025	1,851	56.06%	1,435	43.46%	16	0.48%
2021	1,660	61.05%	1,041	38.29%	18	0.66%
2017	1,054	54.02%	850	43.57%	47	2.41%
2013	1,320	68.89%	571	29.80%	25	1.30%
2009	1,286	57.59%	755	33.81%	192	8.60%
2005	1,024	51.85%	887	44.91%	64	3.24%

In the 2013 gubernatorial election, Republican Chris Christie received 68.9% of the vote (1,320 cast), ahead of Democrat Barbara Buono with 29.8% (571 votes), and other candidates with 1.3% (25 votes), among the 1,949 ballots cast by the borough's 4,723 registered voters (33 ballots were spoiled), for a turnout of 41.3%. In the 2009 gubernatorial election, Republican Chris Christie received 56.9% of the vote (1,286 ballots cast), ahead of Democrat Jon Corzine with 33.4% (755 votes), Independent Chris Daggett with 7.0% (159 votes) and other candidates with 1.5% (33 votes), among the 2,260 ballots cast by the borough's 4,615 registered voters, yielding a 49.0% turnout.

United States Senate election results for Butler1
Year	Republican		Democratic		Third party(ies)	
Year	No.	%	No.	%	No.	%
2024	2,307	58.35%	1,555	39.33%	92	2.33%
2018	1,696	58.36%	1,103	37.96%	107	3.68%
2012	1,586	53.40%	1,341	45.15%	43	1.45%
2006	1,261	58.62%	838	38.96%	52	2.42%

United States Senate election results for Butler2
Year	Republican		Democratic		Third party(ies)	
Year	No.	%	No.	%	No.	%
2020	2,262	53.69%	1,897	45.03%	54	1.28%
2014	857	58.62%	579	39.60%	26	1.78%
2013	805	62.79%	466	36.35%	11	0.86%
2008	1,714	54.48%	1,386	44.06%	46	1.46%

== Education ==
The Butler Public Schools serves students in pre-kindergarten through twelfth grade. As of the 2021–22 school year, the district, comprised of three schools, had an enrollment of 1,156 students and 109.7 classroom teachers (on an FTE basis), for a student–teacher ratio of 10.5:1. Schools in the district (with 2021–22 enrollment data from the National Center for Education Statistics) are Aaron Decker School with 379 students in grades K-4, Richard Butler School with 299 students in grades 5-8 and Butler High School with 455 students in grades 9-12.

Students from Bloomingdale attend Butler High School as part of a sending/receiving relationship with the Bloomingdale School District.

St. Anthony of Padua School was a Catholic school operated under the auspices of the Roman Catholic Diocese of Paterson that was closed in June 2012 in the face of declining enrollment, after having served the community for 130 years.

== Transportation ==
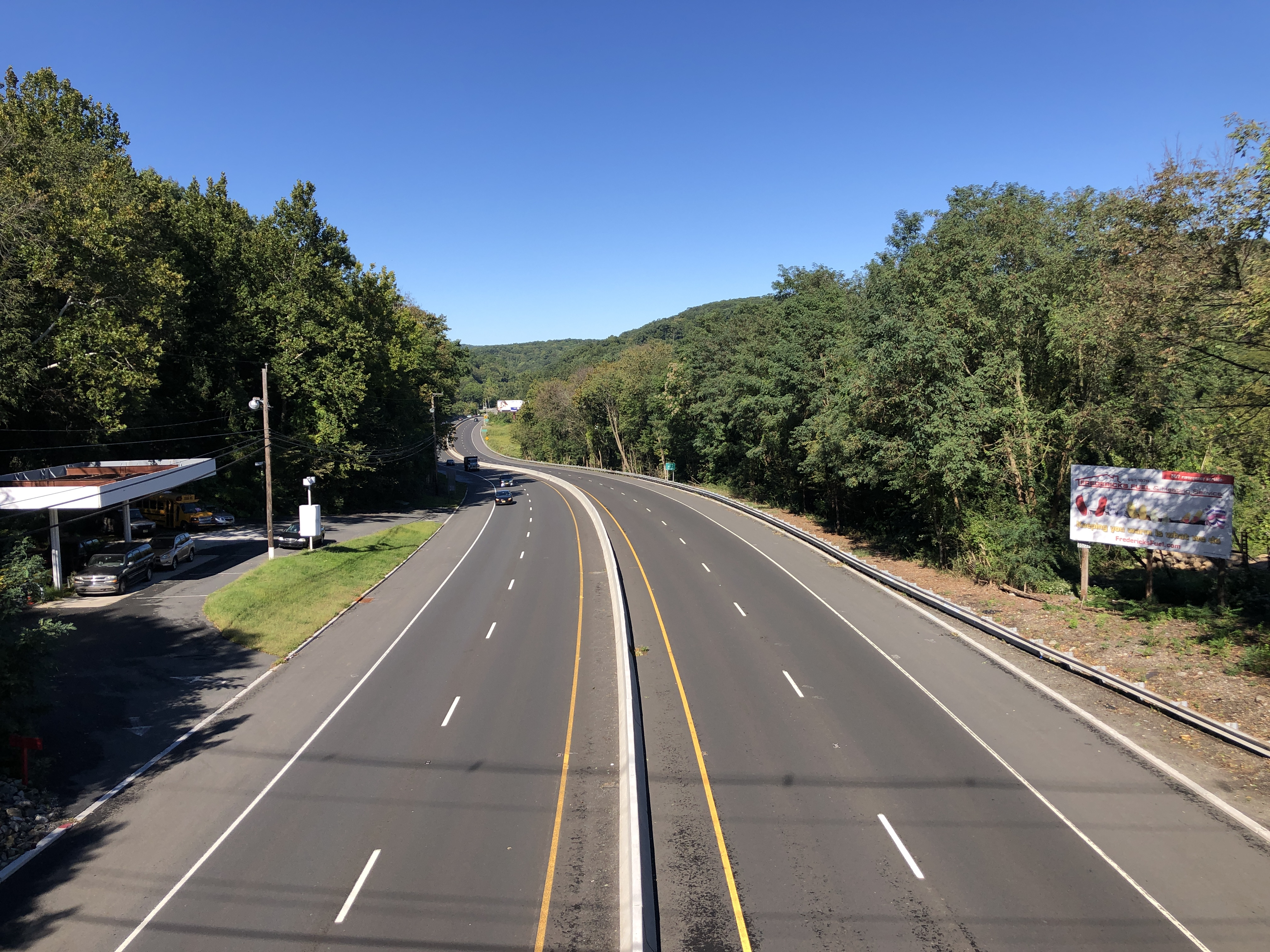
Route 23 northbound in Butler

=== Roads and highways ===
As of May 2010, the borough had a total of 27.84 miles (44.80 km) of roadways, of which 23.29 miles (37.48 km) were maintained by the municipality, 2.40 miles (3.86 km) by Morris County and 2.15 miles (3.46 km) by the New Jersey Department of Transportation.

New Jersey Route 23 is the main highway serving Butler. County Route 511 also traverses the borough. Interstate 287 passes just outside the borough limits within neighboring municipalities.

=== Public transportation ===
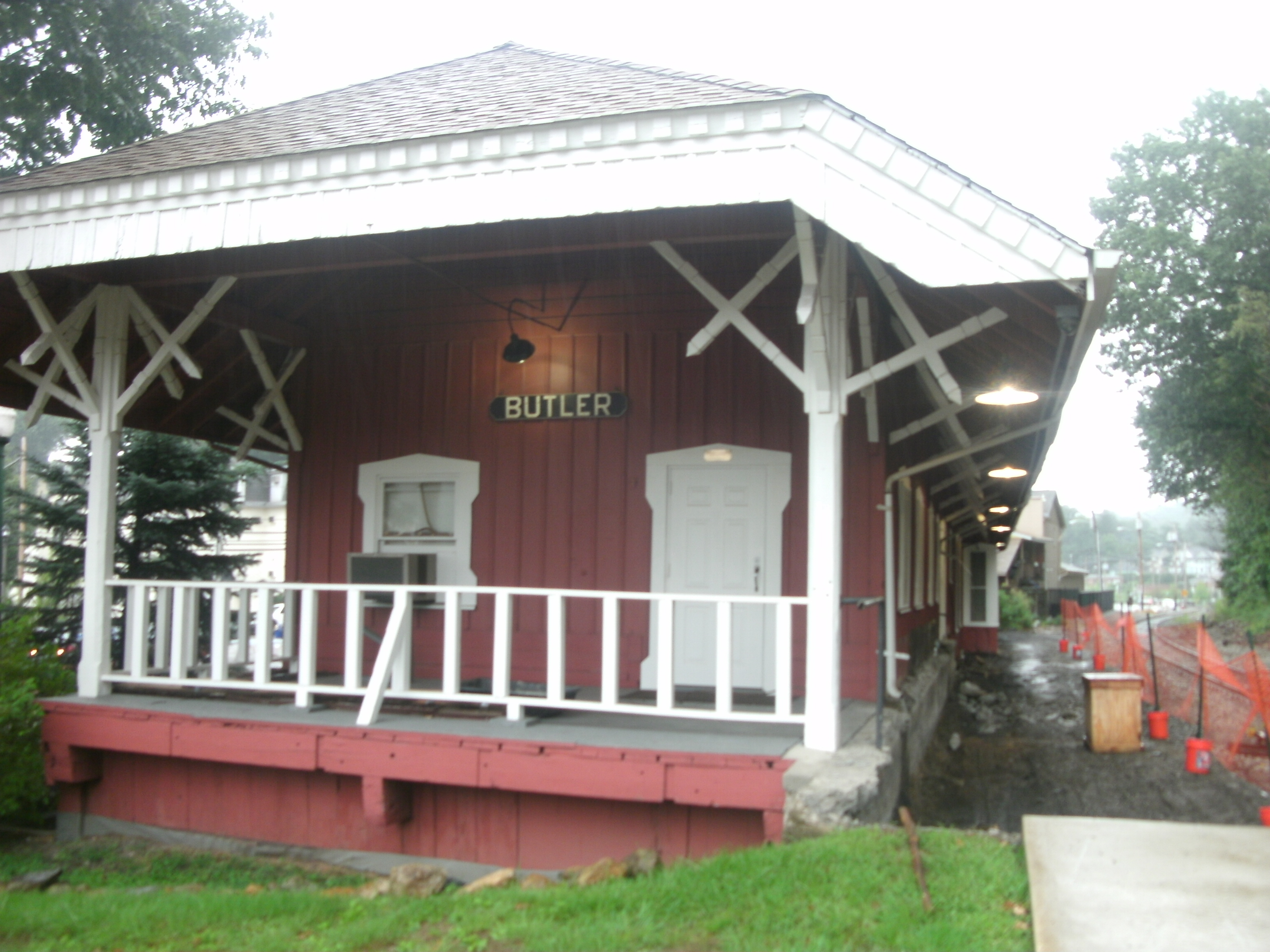
The former Butler station (for the New York, Susquehanna and Western Railroad) as seen in August 2011 just before Hurricane Irene

NJ Transit bus service is provided on the 194 route to and from the Port Authority Bus Terminal in Midtown Manhattan.

== Notable people ==
People who were born in, residents of, or otherwise closely associated with Butler include:

- Kurt Adler (1907–1977), music conductor
- Frederick Aldrich (1927–1991), marine biologist best known for his research on giant squid
- Benedict Lust (1872–1945), naturopathy pioneer who founded the Yungborn health resort
- Harry L. Sears (1920–2002), politician who served for 10 years in the New Jersey Legislature
- Andrew Turzilli (born 1991), wide receiver who played in the NFL for the Tennessee Titans
- Gary Wehrkamp (born 1970), musician, songwriter and producer best known a member of the progressive rock band Shadow Gallery

== Points of interest ==
- The Butler Museum is located on Main Street in the former NYS&W railroad station, across from 234 Main Street. The museum houses exhibits that reflects on the town's history.
