= Terhune =

Terhune may refer to:

== People ==
- Albert Payson Terhune (1872–1942), American author
- Anice Terhune (1873–1964), American author and composer
- Christine Terhune Herrick (1859–1944), American author
- Edward Payson Terhune (1830–1907), American author
- Evelyn Terhune, (1932–1981), American Olympic fencer
- Mary Virginia Terhune (1830–1922), American author
- Max Terhune (1891–1973), American film actor
- Warren Terhune (1869–1920), 13th Governor of American Samoa

== Places ==
- Terhune, Indiana, a small town in the United States
- Terhune Orchards, a winery in New Jersey, United States
- Terhune Run, a tributary of Lawrence Brook, New Jersey
