= Virginia Terhune Van de Water =

American writer

Virginia Terhune Van de Water (1865–1945) was a writer. Three of her stories were adapted to film: If My Country Should Call (1916), The Lesson (1917), and Two Sisters (1929).

Vandewater was born in Newark, New Jersey. She was the daughter of author Mary Virginia Terhune and had siblings who also became writers (Albert Terhune and Christine Terhune Herrick).

Her story "In the Web of Life" ran in the Los Angeles Herald. Her book From Kitchen to Garret (1910) is a guide to housekeeping.

Her book Why I Left My Husband, and Other Human Documents of Married Life, a volume of stories originally published in 1912 in Good Housekeeping and The Cosmopolitan, has been described by the literary critic Susan Fraiman as "a collection of painfully disillusioned tales, unvarnished renderings of marital alienation from multiple perspectives, including that of a daughter driven from home to escape the cross fire." The stories describe various couples, some of whom remain separated and some of whom remain in unhappy marriages, and provide moral and emotional rationalizations for divorce.

Towards the end of World War I, two pamphlets by Van de Water, entitled Women and Bolshevism and What the Victory or Defeat of Germany Means to Every American, were published by the National Security League.

== Bibliography ==
- Why I Left My Husband: And Other Human Documents of Married Life (1912), Moffat, Yard and Company, New York
- From Kitchen to Garret (1910)
- In the Web of Life (1914)
- Two Sisters (1914)
- Women and Bolshevism (1918)
