= Further Adventures of Lad =

1922 American novel written by Albert Payson Terhune

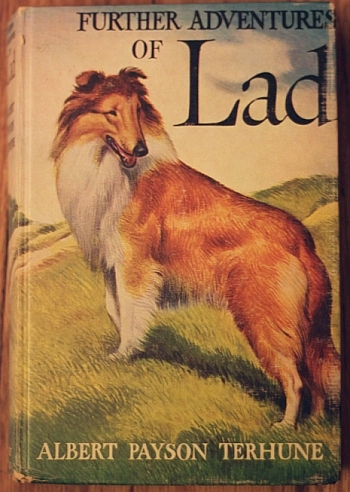
- 1922 Grosset & Dunlap second printing cover
- Author: Albert Payson Terhune
- Cover artist: Charles Livingston Bull
- Language: English
- Genre: Young adult fiction
- Publisher: George H. Doran Company
- Publication date: 1922
- Publication place: United States
- Media type: Print (hardcover)
- Pages: 341 pp (first edition)
- OCLC: 7443640
- Preceded by: Lad: A Dog
- Followed by: Lad of Sunnybank

Further Adventures of Lad, also known as Dog Stories Every Child Should Know, is a 1922 American novel written by Albert Payson Terhune and published by George H. Doran. A follow-up to Lad: A Dog, it contains an additional eleven short stories featuring a fictional version of Terhune's real-life Rough Collie Lad, including the stories of Lad's initial arrival at the "Place", the death of his mate, and the day of his own death. Most of the stories were originally published in various magazines, and touch on themes of justice and the concepts of right and wrong. Terhune notes that he decided to publish the novel due to numerous letters received in response to the first novel, and the thousands of visitors who came to Sunnybank to visit the real-life Lad's grave. Though he initially intended for Further Adventures of Lad to be the final book of Lad stories, he would eventually publish one more book of stories, Lad of Sunnybank, in 1929.

The novel was a bestseller and well received by fans of the first novel, as well as new readers. Critics praised the stories as "charming" and "entertaining", finding Lad a "delightful" and desirable dog. A critic for the New York Tribune, however, criticized Terhune's writing style and felt Lad was an unbelievable character, while also still noting that book lovers would enjoy it. It was listed among H.W. Wilson Company's 1922 list of 10,000 books they deemed the "most useful". Warner Brothers purchased the film rights for Lad: A Dog, Further Adventures of Lad, and Lad of Sunnybank, intending to produce a series of films and possibly a television series. The first film, Lad: A Dog, was released in June 1962 but it was unsuccessful in the box office and the project was dropped. The novel is now a public domain work.

== Plot ==
"The Coming of Lad"

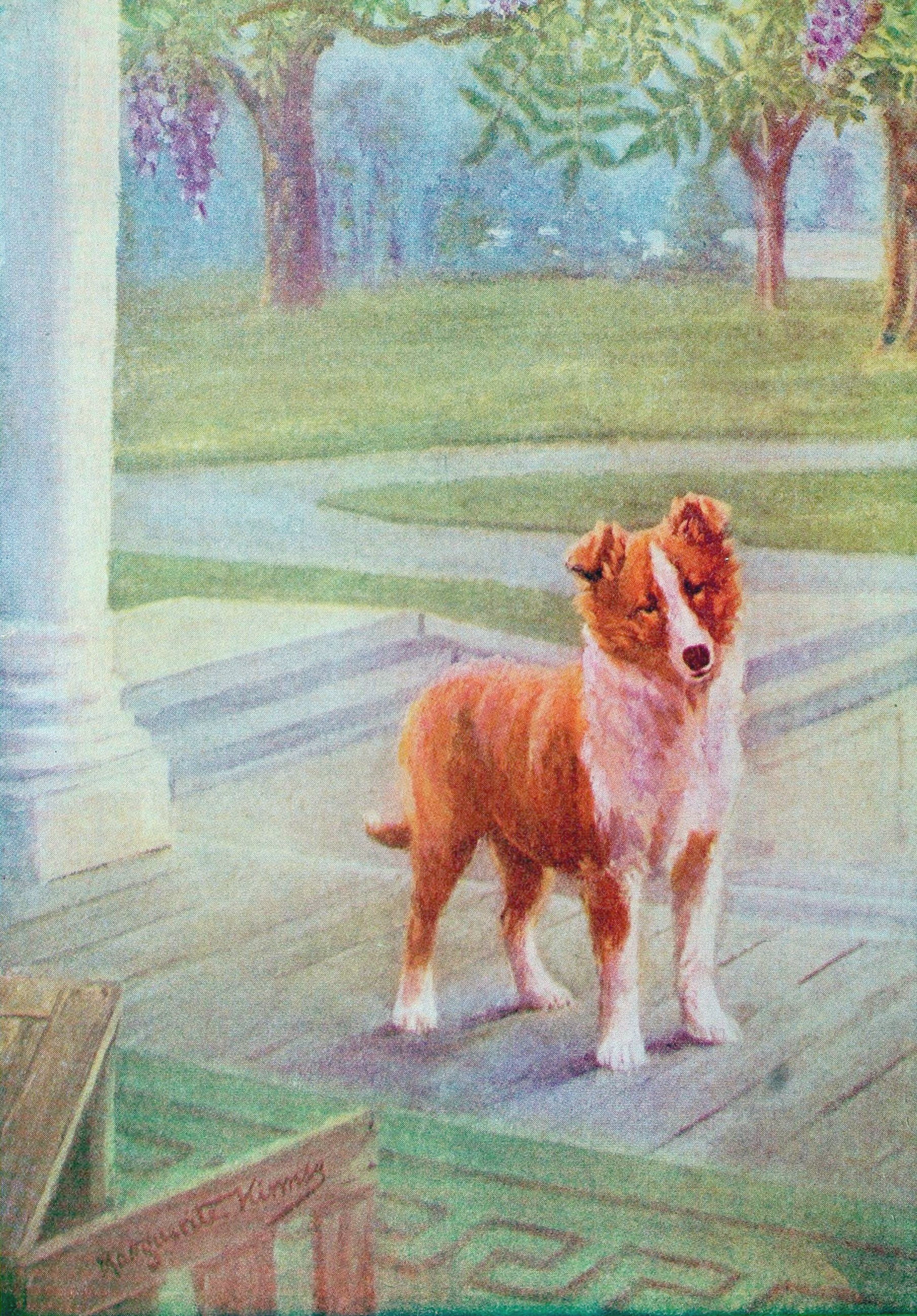
The young Lad (by Marguerite Kirmse, ca. 1922)

A couple, referred to only as the Master and Mistress, purchase a pure-bred Rough Collie named Lad to be the guard dog of their home, the Place. Though they are surprised when they receive a puppy instead of an adult dog, they decide to keep him and he quickly shows himself to be very intelligent and easily trainable. At first, Lad views all people as friends, including a burglar who robs the house one night. When the man climbs out the window with a bag of loot, Lad thinks he is playing a game and snatches the bag in play. The thief chases Lad, then shoots him to get back the bag. Lad realizes the man is not friendly and turns to attack him, but the thief falls into a ditch, knocking himself unconscious. Afterward, Lad no longer trusts strangers so easily and has become a true watchdog.

"The Fetish"

While in town with the Mistress, Lad saves her from an attack by a sick dog being chased by the police and other citizens, who believe it to be rabid. The dog is shot and the upset Mistress, who knew it was not really rabid, goes home. The next day, the town constable comes by boat to the Place to execute Lad under the notion that he is now rabid. The Master argues that the other dog was not rabid and refuses to allow Lad to be shot, ordering the officer off his property. As the man is leaving, his boat overturns. Unable to swim, he is in danger of drowning until Lad jumps in and brings him back to shore. The grateful officer states that he killed the dog he came to kill and Lad only looks a little like him.

"No Trespassing!"

Two young couples trespass on the Place's lake shore, only to be driven off by the Master and Lad. A week later, Lad is taken to compete in a dog show in Beauville. One of the men from the lake is there to show his boss' champion Lochaber King. He plots to dye Lad's coat red to embarrass the Master for the earlier incident, but accidentally dyes Lochaber King's coat instead, after the two dogs change locations. He is left having to answer for the dog's ruined coat while Lad wins the silver trophy.

"Hero-Stuff"

The Master and Mistress buy a female collie puppy named Lady to be Lad's companion and mate. Lad becomes her protector and slave, as she bullies him from his food and the best places to lie and he endures the flashes of nasty temper that lead her to bite his ears and paws. As she grows older, she becomes a generally well-behaved house dog, but when she is eight months old, she tries to attack a beloved mounted bald eagle belonging to the Master. He whips her and then locks her in a shed for the night as punishment; however, during the night it catches on fire. Lad desperately tries to break down the door to free her, then howls in agony, before jumping through its high window to join Lady inside. The Master, awakened by Lad's howl, arrives in time to free them both, though both have badly burned coats.

"The Stowaway"

When Lady returns from a fifteen-week hospital stay, she abandons Lad to play with their son Wolf, whom she no longer recognizes. The moping Lad takes to hiding in the car to beg for a ride and accidentally becomes a stowaway when the Master and Mistress go to the Catskills to visit friends. As dogs are not allowed in the residential park where they are staying, they take Lad to a kennel, but he quickly escapes and returns to the park. While waiting for the Master and Mistress to wake up, he follows a strange scent through a neighbor's house, leading to his being blamed for destroying a room in that house. However, it is quickly discovered that the vandal was another neighbor's pet monkey, hidden by its owner who did not like the park's new "no pet" rules. When Lad returns home, Lady effusively greets her returned mate.

"The Tracker"

Cyril, an eleven-year-old with a nasty penchant for making trouble, comes to stay at the Place for three months. While there, he frequently lies, sneakily torments Lad and plays such horrible pranks on the staff that two quit. After he is caught kicking Lad in plain sight, the Master loses his temper and scolds him. Cyril goes into a rage and runs away in a snowstorm. He gets lost and falls off a high cliff, landing on a small ledge. Lad finds him there, but has to jump down to the ledge to save the boy from a bobcat. Now trapped with the boy, Lad keeps him warm until a rescue party arrives.

"The Juggernaut"

Lad's mate Lady is run over and killed by a speeding driver who deliberately aimed his car at her. Lad and his owners both saw the crime, but were unable to catch up to the driver in time. Lad grieves terribly until they go to a local tennis tournament where he finds Lady's killer. He attacks the man to kill him, but the Master calls him off. The Mistress explains to the shocked crowd what the man had done, then takes a cured Lad home. They later learn that the crowd destroyed the man's expensive car and he was expelled from the club for killing Lady.

"In Strange Company"

The Master and Mistress take Lad on their annual fall camping trip to the mountains for two weeks. During the trip, Lad playfully teases a bear, leading to a fight, which the Master ends by scaring off the bear. At the end of the trip, Lad is accidentally left tied to a tree at the camp site. While his owners are returning to find their missing dog, Lad is trapped by a forest fire. When the bear he fought earlier rushes past with singed fur, Lad chews through his rope and follows the other animals of the forest to sit in a nearby lake. When his owners arrive, he runs through the burning fire to join them, blistering his paws on some coals.

"Old Dog; New Tricks"

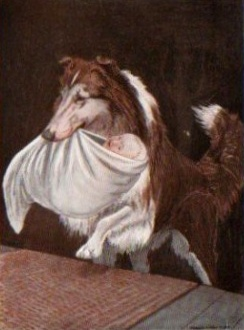
Lad brings the baby home (by Charles Livingston Bull, ca. 1922).

After 12-year-old Lad is praised for bringing the Mistress a lace parasol that he found on the road, he begins searching the road for more things to find, sometimes stealing them unintentionally from people who were nearby but not watching their items. As he had gotten more sensitive in his older age, his owners always praised him for the gifts, which ranged from a full picnic basket to roadkill. One night, he "finds" a baby, who was kidnapped from a wealthy household by a disgruntled former employee and his kin. The baby had been set in the grass by his two kidnappers while they changed a flat tire. The kidnappers eventually catch up to Lad, who is carrying the child home. He fights off the men when they attack him, eventually chasing them back to their car, and they escape. The baby is returned to his parents and the kidnappers arrested, but Lad is hurt that his present results in no praise, just a lot of activity around the house.

"The Intruders"

A large, cranky sow escapes from its herd and attacks the Mistress after she tries to shoo it out of her garden. Lad charges between them and battles the sow, but with his old age and blunt fangs he struggles with the fight and is badly injured. Bruce and Wolf return from a forest romp in time to aid him and the younger dogs are able to easily drive her off. While fleeing, the pig runs directly into the path of one of the Place's cars, driven by a car thief who is knocked unconscious. Lad's feelings are hurt by the battle being finished by the other dogs and the Mistress' holding him back from joining them at the end, but he quickly forgives her.

"The Guard"

At 16, the aging Lad befriends Sonya, a seven-year-old girl whose father works at the Place. Her father forces her to assist him with his work, then brutally mistreats her if she is slow. The Master and the Place's superintendent try to quell the behavior, with no success. During a walk with the girl, Lad protects her from her father. The next day, while the Master and Mistress are at a show and the other workers are off on holiday, Sonya's father starts to beat her for accidentally dropping a heavy basket. Lad comes to her rescue and they retreat to the veranda where she pets him while he sleeps. When Sonya goes to the barn, her father is waiting for her and closes the door. Somehow she senses Lad beside her, which gives her the courage to stand up to her father. The man imagines he sees Lad beside her and runs away in fear. Unknown to both, Lad had died in his sleep and the Master and Mistress were crying over his body on the veranda.

== Development and publication ==
In 1915, Albert Payson Terhune penned his first canine short story, "His Mate", basing the main canine character on his real-life Rough Collie Lad. After the short story's publication in the January 1916 issue of Red Book Magazine, Terhune began writing additional short stories. The Lad Stories were published in the Saturday Evening Post, Ladies' Home Journal, Hartford Courant and the Atlantic Monthly, though Red Book remained the most consistent purchaser of the stories. Terhune collected twenty of the stories into a novel form, publishing it as Lad: A Dog in 1919, the year after the real Lad died. The novel was well received by critics and readers, becoming a best seller.

Available evidence indicates that the real Lad was born in December 1902, and that unlike his fictional counterpart, Lad was a collie of unknown lineage with no American Kennel Club registration papers. After living five years with a heart tumor, the dog died on September 3, 1918, and his obituary was featured on a multi-page spread of the September 14, 1918, issue of Field and Fancy magazine. Terhune reported that he received hundreds of letters from fans asking him to publish more stories about Lad and that over 1,700 people visited Lad's grave at Sunnybank. In 1922, he collected together eleven more short stories into a novel; the stories were published earlier in The Ladies' Home Journal, with some new stories and some from other magazines. The new set of stories primarily revolved around the themes of right and wrong, abuse of authority and justice. Intending it to be the last book he would write about his late collie, Terhune killed the fictional Lad in the last chapter of the novel. The novel was published by George H. Doran as Further Adventures of Lad. Seven years and twenty other novels later, he would change his mind and release one more Lad novel, Lad of Sunnybank, which was published by HarperCollins.

After the initial publication, Further Adventures of Lad was re-released in the same year by Grosset & Dunlap. In 1941, it was republished by Doubleday as Dog Stories Every Child Should Know, and has since entered the public domain. It has released online by Project Gutenberg, in print-on-demand form by Echo Library and as a downloadable eBook by Ebookslib.

== Reception ==
Further Adventures of Lad quickly became a best-seller and was praised by both new readers and existing fans. Critics, however, gave it more mixed reviews. The Literary Digest called the stories "delightful sketches" that invoked a feeling of "privilege [at being] admitted to the friendship and to obtain the devotion of an animal like Lad." The reviewer for the Springfield Republican found it as "entertaining" as the previous novel and felt it was "written with the same understanding of dog nature which made the other stories universally read." A reviewer for the Olympia Daily Recorder considered it a "charming story" and a "worth while" book, calling Lad both "delightful" and a "great hero". However, Isabel Paterson, of the New York Tribune, considered Lad to be an unbelievable and undesirable dog and felt that Terhune wrote in a "rather hysterical style" whose "incessant piling up of the agony and adjectives [was] wearing." Despite these failings, she did note that dog lovers would likely enjoy the book.

The H.W. Wilson Company listed it in its 1922 Standard Catalog Bimonthly, a selection of "10,000 titles of the most useful books covering all classes of literature." In the 1960s, Warner Brothers purchased the film rights for the novel from the late Terhune's wife Anice Terhune, hoping to produce a sequel and possible television series as a follow-up to Lad: A Dog, the film adaptation of the first novel it had released in June 1962. However, the film was not as successfully as the studio hoped and all plans for follow-ups were dropped.
