= Horace Terhune Herrick =

American agricultural scientist

Horace Terhune Herrick (April 22, 1887 – October 8, 1948) was a scientist and director of the North Regional Research Laboratory of the United States Department of Agriculture.

He was born in Newark, New Jersey on April 22, 1887 to James Frederick Herrick and Christine Terhune Herrick. Herrick graduated from Columbia University from the Henry Krumb School of Mines with a degree in chemical engineering and by 1910 was working in the research laboratories of the New Jersey Zinc Company, in Palmerton, Pennsylvania.

In 1929 he developed a process for making gluconic acid by fermentation with Orville E. May which was subsequently covered in wider media.

He died on October 8, 1948.
