= Roberta Hodes =

American writer (1927–2021)

- Born: Roberta Olivia Hodes; February 17, 1927; New York City, New York, U.S.
- Died: January 19, 2021 (aged 93); New York City, New York, U.S.
- Education: Vassar College
- Occupation(s): Script supervisor, screenwriter, director

Roberta Olivia Hodes (February 17, 1927 – January 19, 2021) was an American writer, director, producer, NYU Film Professor and Local 161 Charter member of the script supervisor union who was active from the 1950s through the 2000s.

== Biography ==
After graduating from Vassar College in 1946, she took acting classes in New York City alongside people like Rod Serling, Harry Belafonte, and Rod Steiger. She then spent time in Israel, where she got her first taste of the film industry working on a documentary.

Roberta briefly went to Hollywood, where she got a job as a script reader. She quickly began to feel that she wouldn't have many opportunities as a woman in the industry, so she moved back to New York. There, she got her start as a script supervisor for Elia Kazan; three of her earliest credits were on On the Waterfront, Baby Doll, and A Face in the Crowd.

Roberta became Script Supervisor to Martin Scorsese on "King of Comedy" and later, the independent film, "The Dow of Steve". Brilliant, passionate and full of knowledge, she imparted her wisdom on such students as Ann Lee, Tony Drazen, Spike Lee, Antonia Crey, and Sara Driver. She later became a producer, and was noted as one of the very few female independent producers during the 1960s. She'd later co-write the 1962 film Lad, a Dog, and direct the 1977 film A Secret Space.

Roberta later became a beloved professor of all things film, Cinema Studies, and Production at New York University. She mentored the careers of many talents from the 1980s, including Ang Lee, Jim Jarmusch and Tony Drazen. Roberta retired in the early 1990s after being beaten by a police officer and suffering lasting injuries, with a legal battle against the city that she won.

Hodes died peacefully in New York City in January 2021, at the age of 93 after a long illness.

== Selected filmography ==
Director:

- A Secret Space (1977)

Writer:

- Lad, a Dog (1962)

Associate producer:

- Lad, a Dog (1962)
- Girl of the Night (1960)
- The Last Mile (1959)

Actress:

- Out of Evil (1951)
