= The Lesson (1917 film) =

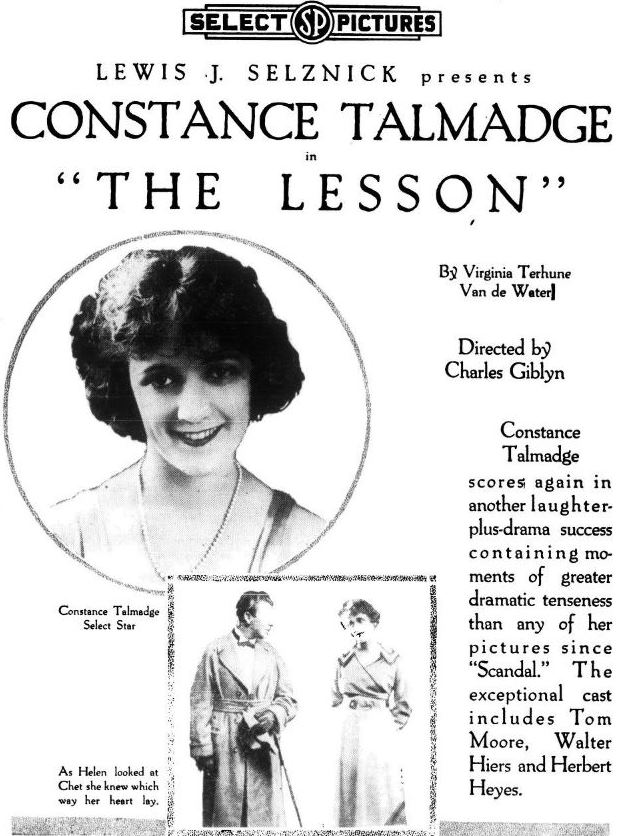
- Advertisement
- Directed by: Charles Giblyn
- Written by: Virginia Terhune Vandewater; Charles Giblyn
- Produced by: Lewis J. Selznick
- Starring: Constance Talmadge; Tom Moore; Walter Hiers
- Production company: Select Pictures
- Distributed by: Select Pictures
- Release date: July 29, 1917
- Running time: 5 reels
- Country: United States
- Language: Silent (English intertitles)

The Lesson is a 1917 American silent comedy drama film directed by Charles Giblyn and starring Constance Talmadge, Tom Moore, and Walter Hiers.

== Plot ==
As described in a film magazine review, Helen Drayton, bored with her small town sweetheart, elopes with an architect from the city. He allows her very little money, although he spends a great deal on himself. She supports herself secretly by doing interior decorating. When she finds that he has been unfaithful, she leaves him, secures a divorce, and marries her former sweetheart who has also come to the city.

== Cast ==
- Constance Talmadge as Helen Drayton
- Tom Moore as Chet Vernon
- Walter Hiers as 'Tub' Martin
- Herbert Heyes as John Galvin
- Joseph W. Smiley as Henry Hammond
- Lillian Rambeau as Mrs. Hammond
- Dorothy Green as Ada Thompson
- Christy Walker as Harriet Reeves

== Bibliography ==
- Donald W. McCaffrey & Christopher P. Jacobs. Guide to the Silent Years of American Cinema. Greenwood Publishing, 1999. ISBN 0-313-30345-2
