= Two Sisters (1929 film) =

1929 American drama film by Scott Pembroke

- Lobby card
- Directed by: Scott Pembroke
- Written by: Arthur Hoerl; Virginia Terhune Vandewater
- Starring: Viola Dana; Rex Lease
- Cinematography: Hap Depew
- Distributed by: Rayart Pictures
- Release date: March 23, 1929
- Country: United States
- Languages: Sound (Synchronized) (English Intertitles)

Two Sisters is a 1929 American sound drama film directed by Scott Pembroke and featuring Boris Karloff. The film is one of the last produced in the sound-on-film process Phonofilm. While the film has no audible dialog, it was released with a synchronized musical score with sound effects using both the sound-on-disc and sound-on-film process. The film is now considered to be lost.

== Plot ==
Two twin sisters are causing confusion for a detective who is pursuing them. One sister is described as good, honest, and sweet, while the other has a tendency towards carrying guns and committing robberies. The detective is having trouble distinguishing between the two sisters and determining which one he is pursuing for what reason, as he has different motives for chasing each one.

== Cast ==
- Viola Dana as Jean / Jane
- Rex Lease as Allan Rhodes
- Claire Du Brey as Rose
- Thomas G. Lingham as Jackson (credited as Tom Lingham)
- Irving Bacon as Chumley
- Thomas A. Curran as Judge Rhodes (credited as Tom Curran)
- Boris Karloff as Cecil
- Adeline Ashbury as Mrs. Rhodes

== See also ==
- Boris Karloff filmography
- List of early sound feature films (1926–1929)
- List of lost films
