= Lad, A Dog =

Book by Albert Payson Terhune

Lad: A Dog
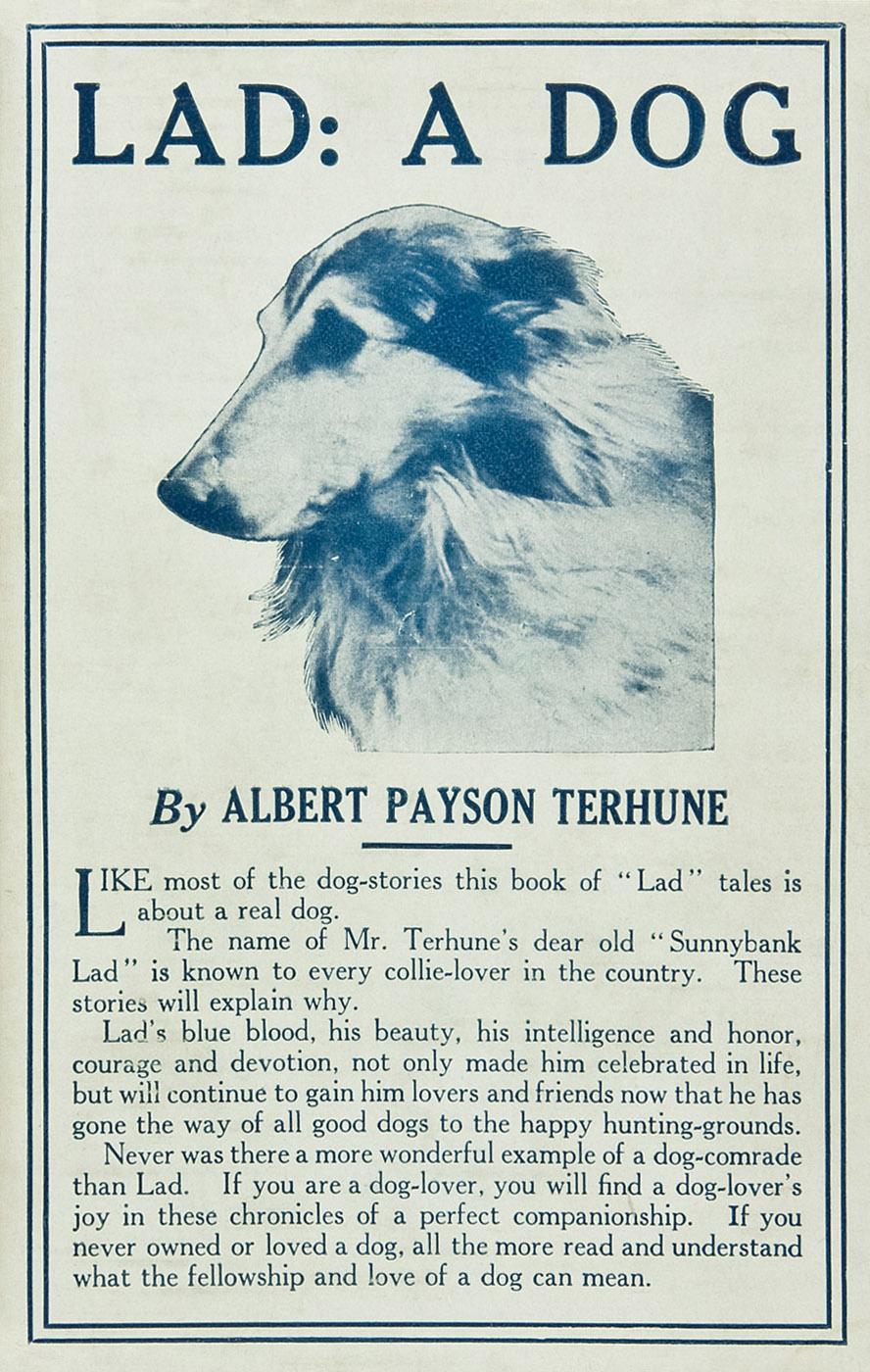
- Original dust jacket
- Author: Albert Payson Terhune
- Language: English
- Genre: Young adult fiction
- Published: May 1919 (E. P. Dutton)
- Publication place: United States
- Pages: 349 pp (first edition)
- OCLC: 234286
- Followed by: Further Adventures of Lad

Lad: A Dog is a 1919 American novel written by Albert Payson Terhune and published by E. P. Dutton. Composed of twelve short stories first published in magazines, the novel is based on the life of Terhune's real-life Rough Collie, Lad. Born in 1902, the real-life Lad was an unregistered collie of unknown lineage originally owned by Terhune's father. Lad's death in 1918 was mourned by many of the story's fans, particularly children.

Through the stories of Lad's adventures, Terhune expresses his views on parenting, obtaining perfect obedience without force and the nature and rights of the "well-bred". Terhune began writing the stories in 1915 at the suggestion of his Red Book Magazine editor. They gained in popularity and, as Terhune was under contractual obligation to submit something to Doubleday-Page, he collected them into novel form. After Doubleday rejected the novel, he solicited other publishers until it was picked up by Dutton. After a slow start, the novel became a best seller in the adult fiction and children's fiction markets, having been repositioned as a young adult novel by Grosset and Dunlap in the 1960s and 1970s. Selling over one million copies, it is Terhune's best-selling work and the one that propelled him to fame. It has been reprinted over 70 times by Dutton and republished by a variety of publishers since its original release, including at least six international translations.

Contemporaneous critics praised Terhune's writing style and the overall story appeal, while dog breeders criticized his unrealistic canine characters. In retrospective reviews, critics considered that the novel had aged badly and that Terhune displayed little actual writing skill, but noted that the novel was able to hold long-lasting appeal as it triggered the reader's desire to have such an ideal dog. Terhune himself considered the novel "hack writing" and did not understand why it was so popular. Because of its reception, he went on to publish two additional novels featuring Lad and one featuring Lad's son, Wolf, as well as many other fictional stories featuring dogs. Warner Brothers released a film, Lad: A Dog, in June 1962. A series of four children's picture books based on three of the stories from the novel were published by Margo Lundell between 1997 and 1998.

== Plot ==
"His Mate"

A Rough Collie named Lad lives at the Place with his Master, Mistress, and his mate, Lady. When Knave, a younger collie, is boarded at the Place, Lady begins ignoring Lad in favor of the newcomer. During a romp in the forest with Knave, Lady is caught in a leghold trap. Knave leaves her there and returns home, but Lad finds her. Several days later, the still limping Lady accidentally gets locked in the library and is subsequently blamed for the destruction of the Master's beloved mounted bald eagle. The Master starts to whip her, but Lad intervenes and takes the whipping himself, knowing Knave was the culprit. Later, he attacks Knave for getting Lady in trouble, sending him fleeing from the Place. As the Master apologizes to Lad, Lady lovingly licks his wounds from the fight.

"Quiet"

On a cold October day, the Mistress falls into the lake and develops pneumonia. As the house must be kept quiet during her recovery, the dogs are sent to a boarding kennel, except Lad who is ordered to keep quiet. One night a thief breaks into the house, hoping to take advantage of the absence of the dogs. After he climbs through a window, Lad silently attacks him. During the ensuing fight Lad is cut with a knife before sending the man crashing back through the window. The noise wakes the humans of the house and the thief is arrested. After Lad's wound is treated, he enjoys praise from the Mistress, then travels some distance from home to enjoy a lengthy session of barking.

"A Miracle or Two"

One spring, a relative of the Mistress brings her invalid toddler, Baby, to the Place in the hope that the weather will help her grow stronger. Lad immediately befriends the girl and becomes her constant companion. By summer, Baby is growing healthier, though she is still unable to walk. One afternoon, the mother sits the child near the lake, then leaves her to go meet the Master and Mistress, who are returning from town. Lad saves the baby from a copperhead, but the distraught mother only sees Lad throw her backwards and begins beating him. To protect her friend, Baby manages to shakily walk to her mother and explain what happened. While the humans fuss over the occurrence, Lad sneaks off and spends four days buried in marsh mud to draw out the snake's poison.

"His Little Son"

Lady gives birth to three pups, but two of were sick and died, she names the remaining pup Wolf. She later develops distemper and is taken away by the veterinarian, so Lad takes over the raising of his son, solemnly teaching him the Law of the Place. Wolf comes to love and respect his father and soon forgets his mother, though Lad continues to search for her daily. A month later, Wolf falls through the ice of the semi-frozen lake, and Lad nearly drowns while saving him. When Lad staggers to shore, he is ecstatically greeted by the recovered Lady.

"For a Bit of Ribbon"

The Master and Mistress enter Lad in the Westminster Dog Show in New York, much to Lad's abject misery as he dislikes the preparatory bathing and brushing. Dismayed to learn that Lad will have to stay chained to a small bench for all four days of the event, his owners begin to regret bringing him. To their joy, Lad wins the blue ribbon in both the Novice and Winner classes, and they decide not to subject him to the four-day stay. When they let Lad know he is going home, he joyfully perks up.

"Lost!"

Due to city regulations, the Master and Mistress are forced to muzzle Lad when they take him from the show. During the drive out of the city, Lad falls out of the car and is left behind. After he realizes he is lost, Lad starts towards home. Along the way he is chased by the police and a crowd of people, who presume he is rabid, but he escapes them by swimming across the Hudson River. Later he is attacked by a mongrel guard dog, but he refuses to run from the battle. He initially struggles to defend himself while muzzled, but then the other dog inadvertently bites through the strap holding the muzzle on, allowing Lad to quickly defeat him. When the Master and Mistress return from searching for Lad, they find him waiting on the porch.

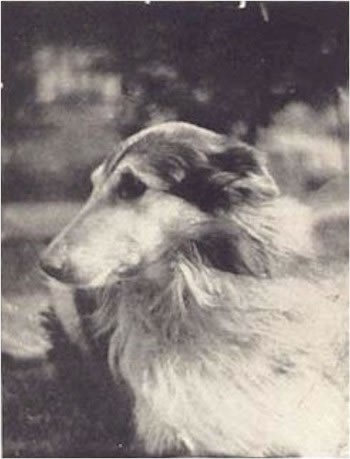
Profile shot of Sunnybank Lad, as seen on a rare postcard printed by Sunnybank in the early 1900s

"The Throwback"

Glure, a wealthy neighbor who considers himself gentry, stops at the Place for a night while on the way to a livestock show with a flock of expensive sheep. During the night, Glure's "Prussian sheep dog", Melisande, worries the sheep and they break free from the pen. Though Lad has never seen sheep, he instinctively herds them together while keeping Melisande under control. When the humans arrive to take the sheep home, Glure's herdsman apologizes for having earlier insulted Lad and Glure offers to trade Melisande for Lad.

"The Golden Hat"

Tired of his high-priced imported livestock losing in local shows, Glure concocts a dog show with a special gold cup event that is limited to collies that are both American Kennel Club blue ribbon winners and capable of completing the tasks of a British working sheepdog trial. Initially, it seems like the only dog who meets the requirements is Glure's recently purchased blue-merle champion, Lochinvar III; however, the Mistress is able to command Lad through the motions of the trial. Lochinvar works primarily by hand signal, so when Glure accidentally burns his fingers on his cigar while going through the trial, the dog stops working and waits for Glure's hand-shaking to be explained. The dog is disqualified and Lad is declared the winner. The Master and Mistress donate the gold cup to the Red Cross in his name.

"Speaking of Utility"

Glure tries to encourage the Master to support the "war effort" by killing his non-utilitarian animals, including his dogs. The Master quickly points out that Glure himself did not "sacrifice" his dogs, but lost them to distemper. Pointing out that Lad had just chased off a trespasser from the Place, he fiercely argues that his dogs are his home's best protection. A few days later during a livestock show, Lad attacks Glure's new groom, recognizing him as the trespasser he chased away earlier. Lad's attack frees a vicious bull, which goes into homicidal rage. Lad abandons his attack of the groom to protect him from the bull. The bull chases Lad over the river and consequently gets stuck in the mud. The Master quickly determines why Lad attacked the man and Glure grudgingly thanks them.

"The Killer"

Lad is accused of killing eight sheep owned by a neighbor. When the Master refuses to believe the accusations, they are taken to court where the neighbor's farmhand testifies that he saw Lad kill two of the sheep. The Master successfully shows the improbability of a single dog carrying off six sheep in two nights and that the two dead sheep left behind were clearly cut with a knife, not teeth. After Lad is given a 24-hour parole, the Master asks the judge to accompany him to the neighbor's house that night, where they discover that the farmhand was actually stealing the sheep, then killing one from each batch to put the blame on Lad.

"Wolf"

Wolf, the companion and friend of the Boy, is highly intelligent and an excellent guard dog. The Boy is upset that he is not allowed to enter the dog shows, though he understands that Wolf does not meet the breed standards. While the family is at a dog show with Bruce and Lad, Wolf is poisoned by an intruder. Having only eaten part of the tainted meat, Wolf is still alive when the thief returns to the house that night and is shot twice while protecting the Place. The thief escapes, but is later apprehended by the police while being treated for his bites. Wolf recovers and is given a "Hero Cup" trophy, to the Boy's delight.

"In the Day of Battle"

On a cold, snowy day, thirteen-year-old Lad feels snubbed when the three-year-old Wolf does not invite him to join him and Rex, a five-year-old collie and Bull Terrier mix, for a run in the woods. Later, Lad goes for a walk, following their path. When he meets them on the trail, rather than letting Lad pass, Rex viciously attacks him. With his teeth dulled by old age, Lad is unable to really fight back. Refusing to just run, he defends himself as best he can while moving backwards towards home, half a mile away. Though Wolf betrays him and joins Rex in the life-or-death fight, Lad manages to get close enough to the house for Bruce to hear the battle and alert the Master and Mistress. The Master is forced to kill Rex after the crazed dog turns on him. After four weeks recovering from his wounds, Lad is able to go outside again and Wolf steps aside for him, acknowledging he is still the leader of the Place's dogs.

== Themes ==
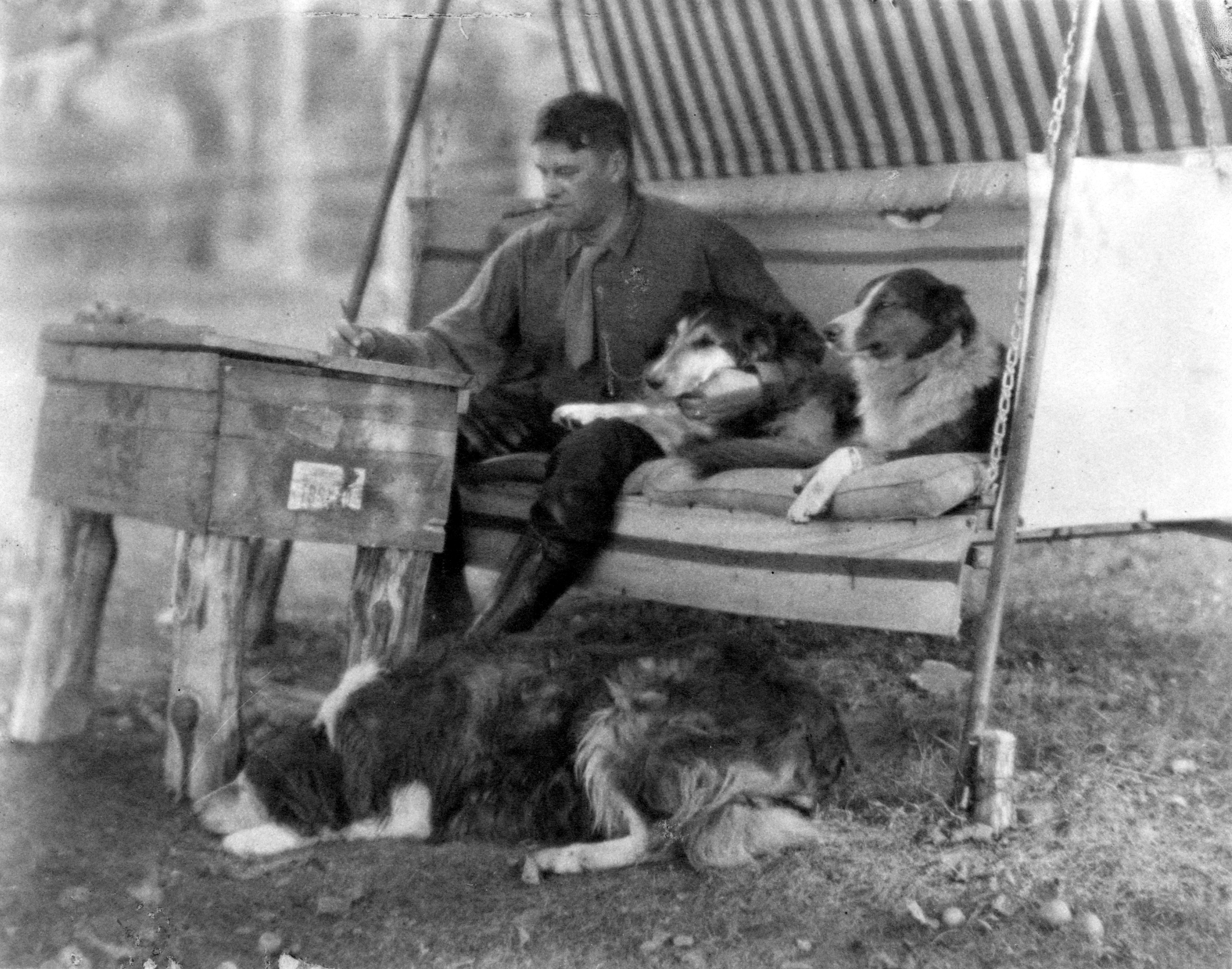
Terhune wrote his stories in the company of his Collies, including Lad, who is lying on the ground in this photo.

The Lad stories tended to follow a persistent formula that Terhune used throughout most of his fiction. The main character was a "noble, almost saintly character" that could engage in battle, exact vengeance as needed, and displayed supernatural intelligence, loyalty, and understanding of the needs of his owners. Lad generally did battle with some villain, human or another dog, in defense of a helpless human or animal. Within each story, Terhune would speak in a positive, authoritative tone while dispensing various tidbits of information about canine behavior and thought processes. Injecting himself and his wife, Anice, into the novel, Terhune positioned the character of the "Master" as a "just, strict, well-intentioned but often rather bumbling man" who could be overly sentimental and was balanced by the "wise, calm, and patient" "Mistress".

One core theme of Lad: A Dog is the obtaining of perfect obedience without the use of force. Through the story characters' attempts at explaining Lad's inexplicable actions using "mythologies of atavism", Terhune reflects his own views of an ideal relationship between a parent and child, namely an "ideology of noble instinct tempered by inflexible training". An unknown third-person narrator also reflects Terhune's perspective and values regarding violence, which is both repelled and embraced. Reflecting patriarchy and the idea of a living creature that obeys unquestioningly and unhesitatingly, the novel indicates that "perfect obedience and submission to a master's will" can be obtained without needing violence or force. Indeed, Terhune regularly decries the use of physical punishment to gain obedience. For example, in the story "His Little Son", Lad takes over the raising of his son, using an even tempered, rational training system that reflects "discipline and firm kindliness". In the end, Lad is stated to have a stronger, love-based relationship with his son versus that of the pup with his mother, the temperamental Lady. Lady raised their son using physical force to impose her will, and thus after she leaves for a period, she is forgotten by him as he holds no love for her.

Within the novel, the Law forbids violence between the inhabitants of the Place. Despite its seemingly unyielding nature, it is in fact broken several times, though always with "good reason". In the story "His Mate", Lad meets and later must win the heart of his mate, Lady. Lad is clearly "enthralled" by the adult Lady's sexual appeal. As Terhune seems reluctant to note the facts of canine mating, Lady is never stated to actually go into heat. Instead the relationship is framed within the context of a "human courtly love triangle" when the "showy" Knave comes to the Place and Lady forgets Lad and fawns on the new arrival. When Lady is believed to have destroyed a beloved mounted bald eagle, the Master breaks the rules against violence and intends to beat her. Lad, in turn, breaks the rules of perfect obedience and growls, becoming the object of punishment and taking the beating in her stead. At the end of the story, when the Master realizes he was mistaken, he apologizes to Lad for beating the wrong dog. Despite the novel's overall theme of nonviolence, the Master's "unreasonable attachment to the bird" becomes the motivation for his "cruelty toward the helpless dogs", yet Lad perceives the Master's actions as "reasonable and functional". Though the numerous tenets of the Law forbid violence in various forms, if the dogs harm something of sentimental value it is deemed justifiable to treat them with "any amount of violence." This change is seen as reflecting a lack of maturity in the Master, and his having a "childish fixation on having his own way", showing a desire to have control and order over that which can never be perfectly ordered: everyday life. Throughout many of the stories, a consistent theme is the Master's imposition of will, behind which is the "blind rage of a child who cannot get exactly what he wants."

The dogs of the Place are trained and commanded to control any violent outbursts against the Place's occupants or guests, yet Lad's engaging acceptable targets is written to "glamorize" the use of violence. Throughout the novel, Lad is victorious in battles against two thieves, a runaway bull, an "invading Negro", and four other dogs, including a battle against two dogs at once. Each of the battles is referred to as a death match, with intricate detail on the tactics and strengths of a fighting collie. Terhune paints him as a "noble savage" who is "human-like, but better than human" and who worships, and is worshiped by, his humans.

Another theme frequently reflected is that of "breeding", in several senses: "pedigree, an inborn sense of manners and behavior, and, elliptically, sex." Showcasing contemporary views of "entitlement and noblesse oblige, the novel reflects Terhune's place as a member of the aristocracy and attempts to "justify the natural rights of the well-bred." The Place is owned by a rich family, that needs to be guarded against threats by foreigners, thieves of all varieties, Negroes, poachers and the homeless. Within the novel, Terhune notes the provisions of the "Guest Law", which reflect a fear of "the flotsam of the American polity". In the character Hamilcar Q. Glure, shows his dislike for the nouveaux riches, those with "new money", over those born and bred into wealth.

The novel also focuses on competition in the venues of the dog shows and combat. Within the novel, despite disliking shows and being an "old style" collie, Lad's "sheer noble nature" enables him to win despite the going preferences for "more superficial qualities". Lad obeys the Law in part because of his heredity as a purebred, and the Master considers himself a thoroughbred due to his having certain "race characteristics that are ingrained in his blood." Frequently, Terhune references atavism, attributing Lad's calling upon hereditary instincts to the presence of "a strain of wolf" in the brains of all collies. This idea also reflects the power of humans over nature.

== History ==
Albert Payson Terhune was an established newspaperman and author of several books in various genres—including histories and thrillers—when he penned his first canine short story, His Mate. Ray Long, then editor for Red Book Magazine, had jokingly suggested he write a story about Lad one afternoon, when the reticent dog put his head on Long's knee after having snubbed the familiar visitor for the last year. Having already tried to market the idea of his writing dog stories to magazines for several years, Terhune readily agreed. The first story featured three Rough Collies, Lad, Lady and Knave, and used a similar formula to his previous works: an average male (Lad) protects a beautiful female (Lady) from a larger villain (Knave). Long purchased the work for Red Book for $200 and it was published in the January 1916 issue. Four magazines requested similar stories, and Terhune complied, finding them easy to write and sell. Additional stories, all featuring Lad and titled Lad Stories, were published in the Saturday Evening Post, Ladies' Home Journal, Hartford Courant, and the Atlantic Monthly, though Red Book remained his most consistent publisher. By 1918, the stories had grown in popularity and Terhune was paid an average of $1,000 each for the tales, with some selling for as much as $2,500,. Though marketed as fiction, even people who were acquainted with the Terhunes and Lad reportedly believed that the stories were real.

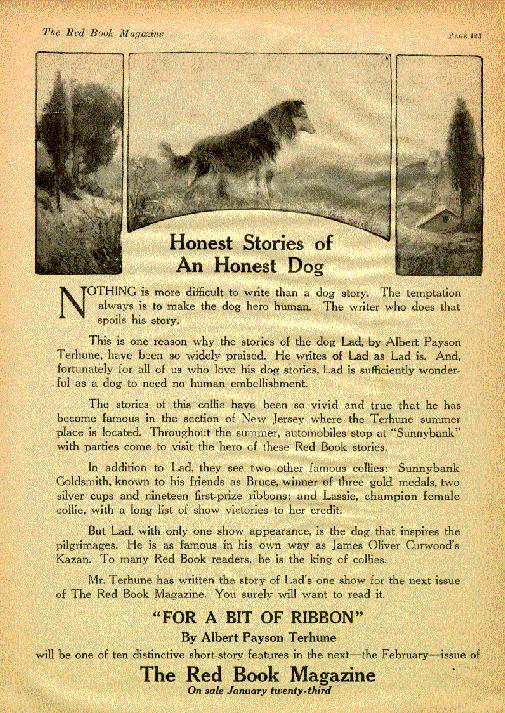
An advertisement in Red Book Magazine (1918) for one of Terhune's short stories on Lad

In 1918, Long began urging Terhune to publish a book of his dog stories, though Terhune himself was not convinced at first. He considered them to be nothing more than "hack writing" and inferior to his other works. Even after Long convinced him of the public's love of the works, Terhune initially did nothing towards the goal. Later that year, Doubleday-Page, which had published Terhune's last novel Fortune, wrote asking to see his next book while reminding him that their contract gave them first refusal rights to it. Wanting to escape from that publisher due to the dismal performance of Fortune, Terhune decided to follow Long's suggestion so he could use the book of dog stories to fulfill his contractual obligation. After he collected together the twenty Lad stories he had written so far, he reorganized them into chapters and submitted the book. He was unsurprised that it was rejected, but in the rejection letter the company referred to Alfred Ollivant's 1898 novel Owd Bob and Jack London's 1903 novel The Call of the Wild as "superior pieces of work". As Terhune himself considered both authors to be unimpressive writers, he became determined that Lad: A Dog would be published. E. P. Dutton's John Macrae, who was a known dog lover, found the stories "simple but charming" and felt the public would like them greatly.

Lad: A Dog was published by Dutton in April 1919, a year after the real-life Lad's death. Terhune continued receiving royalties for the novel up through his own death. His wife, Anice Terhune, ceased receiving the royalties after she surrendered the rights to them, along with those of Bruce and His Dog in exchange for E.P. Dutton agreeing to publish and perpetually print her work Across the Line, a supposed set of conversations she had with her late husband. With this agreement, Dutton became sole owners of the copyright to Lad: A Dog. Macrae later decided that the agreement was not completely fair to Anice and modified it to provide her a payment of $100 a month for the rest of her life, likely exceeding the profits they earned on the novels as the years passed.

=== Real-life Lad ===
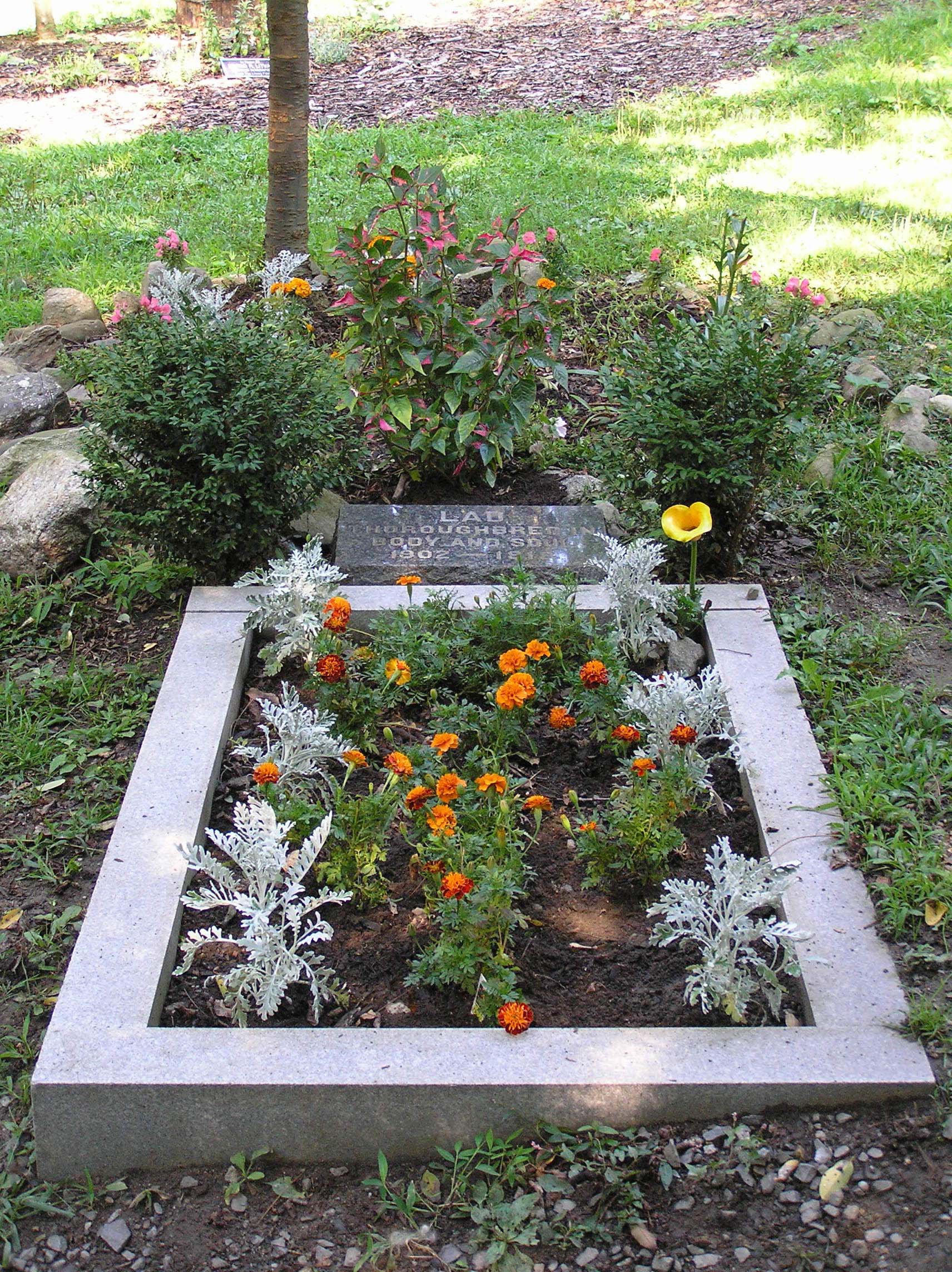
Lad's grave in Sunnybank

Available evidence indicates that the real Lad was born in December 1902 and passed through the hands of at least two owners before coming to Sunnybank. An article in a Terhune family scrapbook indicates that he was likely a mature dog by the time he arrived, possibly not until after Albert Payson Terhune had purchased the Pompton Lakes, New Jersey property from his mother in 1909.

Unlike the fictional Lad, he was not registered with the American Kennel Club and was not a show dog. His pedigree was reportedly lost by one of his previous owners, though there was no doubt he was a purebred collie. At one point, Terhune's wife Anice claimed Lad had twenty champion collies in his pedigree, but this has never been confirmed. On July 4, 1917, Lad was entered into a dog show despite having no papers on his pedigree. It was the only show he ever attended and he won the Veteran Cup. As in the novel, Lad was extremely, even "hostile[ly] reserved" with strangers, wanting little to do with anyone outside of the family.

Terhune donated some of the earnings from the magazine stories to the Red Cross and the Blue Cross in Lad's name, earning the collie the Honorary Crosses of both groups. When Lad was fifteen, he lost his hearing, after which the other dogs in residence began ignoring him and vice versa. Lad died on September 3, 1918, having had a tumor in his heart for five years before his death. Lad's obituary was carried on a multi-page spread of the September 14, 1918 issue of Field and Fancy magazine. He was buried near the driveway of Sunnybank, with the Honorary Crosses he was awarded. He was mourned by thousands of fans who had read Terhune's stories, with dozens of readers, primarily children, visiting Sunnybank to see Lad's grave. In one season, over 1,700 visitors came to see Lad's grave, prompting Terhune to close the place to visitors for the day.

After the Terhunes died, Sunnybank slowly deteriorated, with the house and much of the grounds destroyed. Large chunks of the property were sold by the Albert Payson Terhune, Inc, an organization set up in the wills of Bert and Anice Terhune to provide funds for a charitable organization, the Terhune Foundation. The last ten acres of the property were eventually sold to a housing developer, which included the house, the graves of the Terhune collies and the dogs' old kennels. In 1967, this remaining chunk of Sunnybank was condemned by Wayne Township. The next year, the township made the remaining acres a historical park, Terhune Memorial Park. The Van Riper-Hopper Historic House Museum, located several miles away, displays Terhune's writings, the awards won by the Sunnybank collies and other memorabilia. The graves of Lad, Lady, Wolf and the other Sunnybank dogs are preserved there and available for viewing by visitors. Clippings of Lad's coat are stored at the Library of Congress, having been donated by Anice. Annual gatherings to Sunnybank are organized by the Collie Health Foundation on the third weekend in August, during which speakers familiar with Terhune and his dogs speak, seminars and tours are conducted and various collie-focused events and competitions are conducted. In 2005, Marilyn R. Horowitz published a Sunnybank calendar, the proceeds of which were used by the Terhune Sunnybank Memorial to restore Lad's grave, which had fallen into disrepair, and to aid in maintaining the grounds of Sunnybank.

== Reception ==
The original Lad stories were well received by readers of their respective magazines. After the appearance of His Mate in Red Book, the readers began demanding further stories. Editor Ray Long, who initially purchased His Mate, considered the story In the Day of Battle to be one of the top twenty to appear in Red Book during his time as its editor. The success of the stories propelled Terhune to fame, enabling him to purchase Sunnybank from his mother and quit a loathed job working for a newspaper to become a full-time freelance writer. Although the novel was initially ignored by critics, within weeks it had become a hit. According to Terhune biographer Kurk Unkelbach, it received praise from most of the important critics of the time. The American Kennel Club Gazette reported that Terhune earned over $32,000 from the publication of the Lad stories. Originally aimed towards adults, the novel was a best-seller and gained critical acclaim in the adult fiction market. By the end of the year, the book had gone through 18 printings and by 1935, over 250,000 copies had been sold. In 1939 an anniversary edition was released, marking its 71st printing. During World War II, the novel was republished as a paperback for mass distribution to servicemen as part of the Armed Services Editions. In the 1960s and 70s, the novel was repositioned into the young adult market, by dint of its animal subject matter. Grosset and Dunlap reprinted the novel in new editions that were prominently featured on their children's book lists. By 1970, these new editions had sold over 650,000 copies and overall Lad: A Dog has sold over 1 million copies and remains Terhune's highest seller. Considered the novel that "propelled Terhune to fame", it has been translated into and published in at least six different languages. Recorded Books released an unabridged audiobook edition in 1997 on cassette tape. In 2006, Alcazar AudioWorks released a CD version.

Veteran dog breeders of the times were the primary critics of the novel, chastising Terhune's depiction of an unrealistically perfect collie that would mislead the public into believing such a dog could exist. The anniversary and subsequent editions, featuring a sable-and-white collie, also drew criticism from loyal readers as it did not resemble Lad. New York Times Book Review reviewer Alden Welch felt the full novel would "surely appeal not only to all lovers and masters of dogs, but to many who have never owned any and who have no general and indiscriminate liking for them." He found the stories "interesting" and a "most welcome addition to dog-literature", praising the novel as the most "delightfully written" of Terhune's works to date. In 1968, Sports Illustrated's Robert H. Boyle stated that Terhune's stories were responsible for many of the active collie breeders at the time getting involved in the sport. Calling the author a "godlike figure" and the hero of "goggle-eyed youngsters of the 1920s, '30s and even into the '40s." In comparing the work to popular collie character Lassie, Boyle noted that rather than having Lassie's seeming immortality, Terhune's dogs "led epic lives and they had epic deaths".

In the Fall 1996 issue of Raritan Quarterly Review, Stephen D. Cox, freely admitting to never having read the book, nonetheless called Terhune a "hack writer" who lacked "storytelling skill" and denounced Lad: A Dog as non-literature with "sentences [that] are insufferably stilted and hammy" and "have a tendency to wander off on long romps with his personal obsessions." Terming it a "socially interesting" work, he concedes that the novel has maintained "intense and long-lasting" interest from readers due to its successfully playing on their emotions and "desire to have a collie dog." He quotes Irving Litvag, author of Terhune's biography The Master of Sunnybank, stating that Lad "became the dog we always wanted to have and never did. Maybe even more than that—maybe he became the friend we always waited to find, or even the brother, or the father." In You're Only Young Twice: Children's Literature and Film, Timothy Morris felt the novel had "dated badly" due to changes in American society, and while he stated that he enjoyed the work, in comparing it to Anna Sewell's Black Beauty he faults Lad: A Dog for lacking an "autobiographical frame" and for leaving readers guessing as to what is happening.

== Sequels and adaptations ==
Building on the success of Lad: A Dog, Terhune went on to pen thirty additional canine novels, including two featuring Lad. Further Adventures of Lad, which includes the stories of his arrival at the Place and his death, was published in George H. Doran in 1922. Like the first, it went on to become a best seller, praised by both new readers and existing fans. Critics, however, gave it more mixed reviews. Though some praised the stories and Lad, others felt Lad was unbelievable and harshly denounced Terhune's writing style. Lad of Sunnybank was released in 1929 by HarperCollins, and included another selection of stories about Lad's life. Two of the collies that appear in Lad: A Dog, Lad's son Wolf and another collie named Bruce, both received their own novels. Bruce was published by E. P. Dutton in 1920 and Wolf was published by Doran in 1925.

Published by Scholastic as part of its Hello reader! series, Margo Lundell adapted three stories from the novels into a series of 48 page picture books with illustration by Don Bolognese. The first book, Lad, a Dog: Lad to the Rescue, was released in August 1997 and adapts the story of Lad saving the baby from a venomous snake. The next two, Lad, a Dog: Best Dog in the World (December 1997) and Lad, a Dog: Lad is Lost (February 1998) focus on Lad's first dog show and subsequently becoming lost. The final book, Lad, a Dog: The Bad Puppy, released in May 1998, details Lad's raising of Wolf.

=== Film adaptation ===
In the 1960s, Warner Brothers purchased the film rights for the novel from Max J. Rosenberg, of Vanguard Productions, who had purchased them from E. P. Dutton. They later negotiated with Anice Terhune for the rights to the two follow up novels, hoping to produce a sequel and television series if the first film proved successful. Starring Peter Breck, Peggy McCay, Carroll O'Connor, and Angela Cartwright, the film blended several of the novel's stories with some modifications to make a flowing narrative. Aram Avakian was initially selected to be the film's director, but his refusal to create a sentimental dog story resulted in his firing; he was replaced by Leslie H. Martinson. The film was released on June 6, 1962. Although it was praised by fans and modern reviewers, contemporary critiques felt Terhune's work did not translate well to film and it was considered a low budget B-movie.
