= Anice Terhune =

American author, composer, music educator and church organist

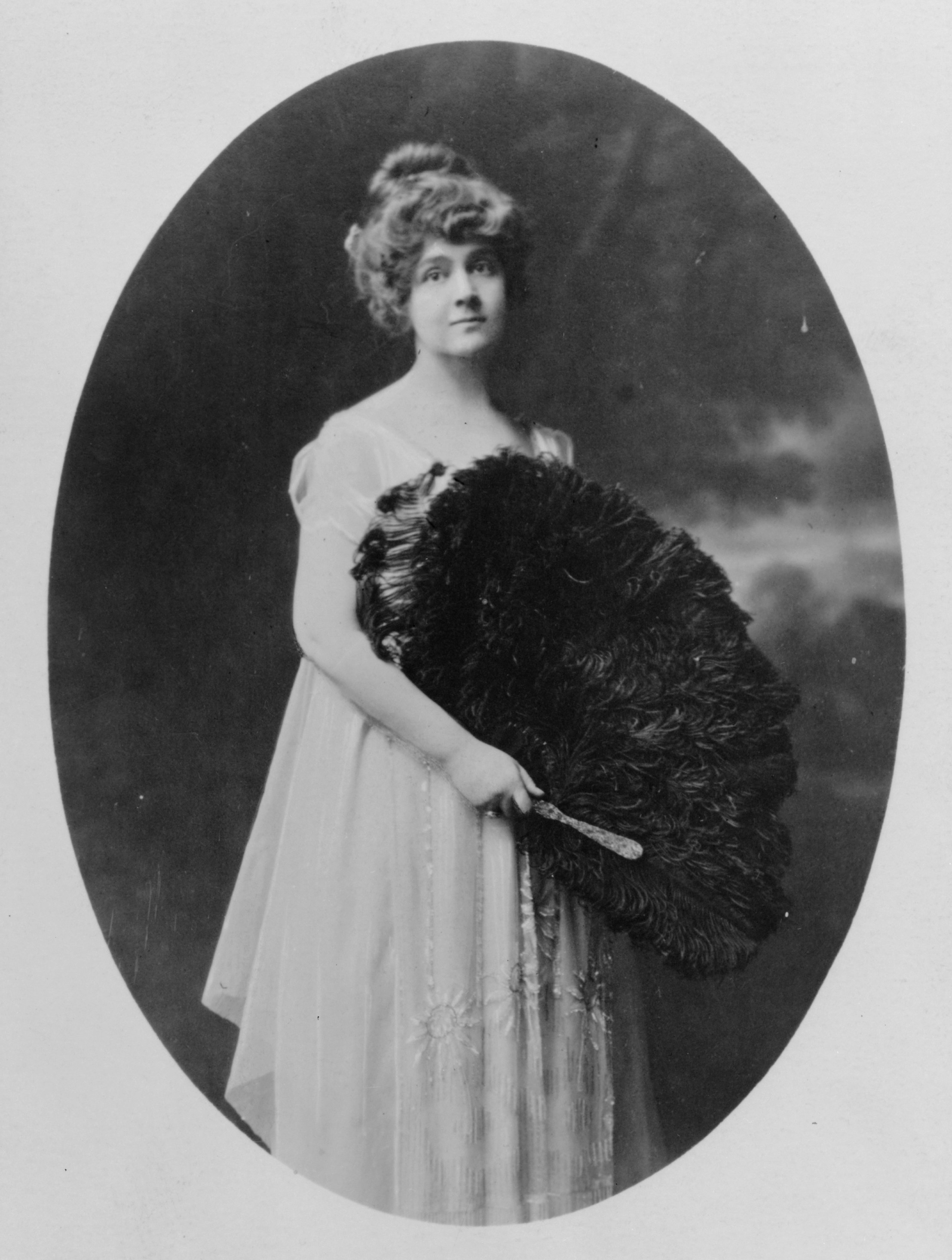
Anice Terhune c. 1890

Anice Potter Morris Stockton Terhune (née Anice Morris Stockton; 27 October 1873 – 9 November 1964) was an American author, composer, music educator, and church organist who composed over 100 children's songs. She sometimes published under the pseudonym Morris Stockton.

== Career ==
Terhune was born in Hampden, Massachusetts. She married Albert Payson Terhune in 1901. She studied piano, organ, and music theory at the Cleveland Conservatory and in New York and Rotterdam, the Netherlands. She was fluent in French and Italian. Her teachers included Franklin Bassett, Edward Morris Bowman, and Louis Coenen.

Terhune wrote articles for women's magazines as well as books. Her book Home Musical Education for Children was syndicated throughout the United States. She belonged to the MacDowell Club and the Pen Women's League. She hosted lectures in her home, including one by Kate Sanborn.

Terhune's works were published by Arthur P. Schmidt, Clayton F. Summy, G. Schirmer Inc., Church, Paxson & Co., and OlivervDitson. Her publications included:

== Books ==
- Across the Line (spiritualism, autobiography)
- Ballade of Dead Ladies (memoir)
- Chinese Child's Day
- Eye of a Village
- Home Musical Education for Children
- Music Study for Children
- Schirmer's Music Spelling Book

== Opera ==
- Hero Nero
- Woodland Princess

== Piano ==
- Child's Kaleidoscope (16 pieces)
- Country Sketches (12 pieces)
- (The) Hill
- An Old Garden (1918)
- Little Dream Horse
- Romance in G Major
- Songs of Summer (six pieces)
- Suite for Piano (six pieces)

== Vocal ==
- "Arrivederci: Italian Serenade"
- Barnyard Ballads
- "Bridal Song"
- Children's Songs from Many Countries
- Colonial Carols
- Dutch Ditties
- "Easter Morn"
- "Exaltation"
- "Faith: A Sacred Song"
- "Gaelic Lullaby"
- "In an Old Garden"
- Our Very Own: a Songbook for Children
- "Snow White Gull"
- Song at Dusk (men's chorus)
- Songs of Our Streets
- "Syrian Woman's Lament"
- "When Summer Keeps the Vow of Spring"

== Bibliography ==
=== Sources ===
- Terhune, Anice (1910). "Song at Dusk". Chorus for Men's Voices With Piano Accompaniment. Words and music by Anice Terhune. G. Schirmer.
- Who Was Who in America. Chicago: Marquis Who's Who. 1968. LCCN 43-3789.
1. Vol. 4: "1961–1968" → "Terhune, Anice". pp. 932–933.
  1. Via Internet Archive (Seminole State College of Florida).
- Wier, Albert Ernest [at Wikidata], ed. (1938). "Terhune, Anice". The Macmillan Encyclopedia of Music and Musicians (in 1 volume). Macmillan. p. 1846.
1. Via Internet Archive (Universal Digital Library).
