= Edward Payson Terhune =

American theologian (1830–1907)

Edward Payson Terhune (November 22, 1830 – May 25, 1907) was an American theologian and author.

He was born on November 22, 1830, in New Brunswick, New Jersey.

Quoting from Appleton's Cyclopaedia:

He was graduated at Rutgers in 1850, and, after the completion of his theological studies at New Brunswick seminary in 1854, was ordained to the ministry of the Presbyterian church in Virginia, becoming pastor of the congregation at Charlotte Court-House (now Smithville). In 1859 he removed to Newark, N. J., and took charge of the 1st Reformed church. He was the American chaplain at Rome, Italy, in 1876-7, returned to the United States in 1878, and was pastor of a Congregational church in Springfield, Mass., from 1879 till 1884, when he took charge of a Reformed church in Brooklyn, N. Y.

He married Mary Virginia Hawes in 1856.

They had six children, three dying in infancy: the survivors were Christine Terhune Herrick, Albert Payson Terhune, and Virginia Terhune Van de Water. He died on May 25, 1907.

== Publications ==
- The Fallacy of Christian Science (King, 1890)
- The Lower James: A Sketch of Certain Colonial Plantations (privately published, 1907)
- Sermons, Vol. 1 (Biblio, 1927)
