= Mary Virginia Terhune =

American author (1830–1922)

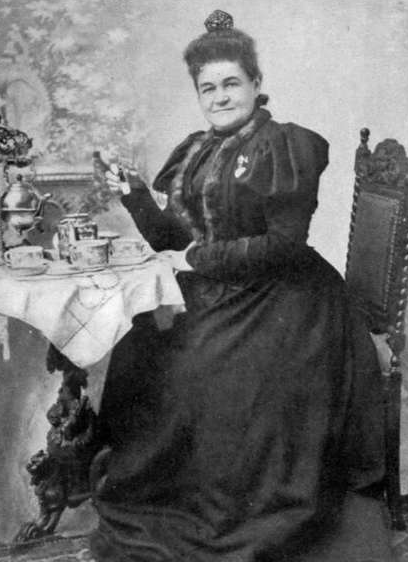
- Terhune c. 1903
- Born: Mary Virginia Hawes; December 21, 1830; Dennisville, Virginia, U.S.
- Died: June 2, 1922 (aged 91); New York City, U.S.
- Resting place: Pompton Lakes, New Jersey
- Occupation: Writer
- Years active: 1844–1922
- Notable work: Alone; Common Sense in the Household: A Manual of Practical Housewifery; Eve's Daughters
- Spouse: Edward Payson Terhune (1856–1907)
- Children: Christine Terhune Herrick; Albert Payson Terhune

Mary Virginia Terhune (née Hawes, December 21, 1830 – June 3, 1922), also known by her penname Marion Harland, was an American author who was prolific and bestselling in both fiction and non-fiction genres. Born in Amelia County, Virginia, she began her career writing articles at the age of 14, using various pennames until 1853, when she settled on Marion Harland. Her first novel Alone was published in 1854 and became an "emphatic success" following its second printing the next year. For fifteen years she was a prolific writer of best-selling women's novels, classified then as "plantation fiction", as well as writing numerous serial works, short stories, and essays for magazines.

After marrying Presbyterian minister Edward Payson Terhune in 1856, Terhune moved with him to Newark, New Jersey, and spent the remainder of her adult life in the North. They had six children together; three died as infants. In the 1870s, shortly after the birth of her last son Albert Payson, she published Common Sense in the Household: A Manual of Practical Housewifery, a cookbook and domestic guide for housewives that became a huge bestseller, eventually selling more than one million copies over several editions.

Terhune began to concentrate on non-fiction, publishing additional cookbooks and domestic works, as well as biographies, travel guides, and histories. She continued to write some novels. She spoke as a public lecturer and was the first woman elected to the Virginia Historical Society. In 1873, the Terhunes relocated to Europe for two years while Mary recovered from tuberculosis. After their return, they continued living in the northeastern United States, moving as her husband's job as a pastor demanded.

After breaking her wrist in her seventies, Terhune learned to use a typewriter. In her 90s, she went blind, but continued work by dictating to a secretary. Her final work, the novel The Carringtons of High Hill, was published in 1919. Terhune continued creating articles and essays until she died on June 2, 1922. Over her life, she published 25 novels, 25 non-fiction works on homemaking and cooking, three short story collections, several biographies, travel guides and histories, and numerous essays, articles, and serial works. Two of her children, Christine Terhune Herrick and Albert Payson Terhune, became noted writers as well, with Herrick following in her mother's footsteps as an authority of domestic matters, and Albert Terhune becoming notable for his novels featuring collies. Her middle child, Virginia Van de Water, also became a writer, though less well known. Late in life, Mary Terhune co-wrote works with each of them.

== Early life ==
Born December 21, 1830, in Dennisville, Virginia, Mary Virginia Hawes was the third of nine children born to Samuel Pierce and Judith Anna Smith Hawes. Terhune was home schooled until her family moved to Richmond, Virginia, in 1844, where she attended a girl's seminary school for two years of formal education. At the age of fourteen, Hawes began writing articles for area newspapers under various pseudonyms.

Her real interest lay in fiction writing, but she initially was unsuccessful in selling her works to magazines. At sixteen, Hawes secretly began work on her first novel, while continuing to try to sell stories to magazines. In 1853, she won a contest held by The Southern Era with her serial novel, Kate Harper, which was published under the pen name Marion Harland. At this time, Hawes shared her completed novel Alone with her two siblings. She edited it for submission to the largest bookstore in Richmond, which sporadically also published books. After the novel was rejected, her father paid the owner to have it published in 1854.

Alone was republished the following year by J. C. Derby, and was considered to be an "emphatic success". Though six publishers expressed interest in Hawes' in-progress second novel, The Hidden Path, she chose Derby as her publisher in 1856. Hawes' career as a writer became firmly established.

Around the same time, she met a young Presbyterian minister, Edward Payson Terhune, with whom she felt a mutual attraction. Hawes did not at first want to marry a clergyman due to the "duties and liabilities" pressed upon a minister's wife. After Terhune moved to Charlotte Court House, Virginia, to assume leadership of a small church, he continued to court her. They were married on September 2, 1856. After their marriage, Mary Terhune continued writing fiction, publishing a novel a year and monthly episodes of serial works.

The Terhunes moved to Newark, New Jersey, in February 1859, after the Reverend accepted a pastorate position there to be closer to his aging father. A few years after their move, the Civil War (1861–1865) cut Mary off from her family, including her brothers who fought for the Confederacy (she supported the Union). Though she frequently wrote about the South in her novels both before and after the war, and expressed her great love of her home state, she lived in the North with her husband for most of her life.

During the first sixteen years of marriage, Mary Terhune gave birth to six children, but lost three of them as infants to illness. Terhune dealt with her pain by turning to her writing. For the next 12 years, from 1862 to 1874, she published a story monthly in the magazine Godey's Lady's Book, which had a circulation of 100,000–200,000, in each but four of its issues. Terhune, or rather her pseudonym Marion Harland, became a household name.

== From novelist to domestic expert ==
After finding current cookbooks less than helpful, Terhune followed her friends' advice and began collecting her own tested recipes, which she wrote in a more accessible manner. Although friends were concerned when she decided to publish a cookbook, in 1872 Terhune began soliciting publishers for her Common Sense in the Household: A Manual of Practical Housewifery, a work gathering recipes and housekeeping tips. Her regular publisher, Carleton, turned down the work, as did other publishers. Eventually, Charles Scribner agreed to publish it in 1872, with little expectation but the hope that she would choose his house to publish her next novel. The work quickly became a best seller, going through ten printings in less than a year, and earning Terhune more than $30,000 in royalties. It was reprinted in French, Spanish, German, and Arabic. During its first ten years, it sold 100,000 copies, and according to a 1920 article in Ladies Home Journal, it eventually sold more than one million.

Terhune was quite satisfied with her non-fiction work, telling her husband that it was more useful than all of her novels combined. Afterward, she became more well known as a writer of domestic topics. She continued to write novels and short stories as well, but at a less frequent pace.

After her initial hesitation about processed foods, she became a kind of spokesperson for the canning industry with the publication of The Story of Canning, published by the National Canners Association, in 1910. The work of domestic advisors like Marion Harland contributed significantly to the rising popularity of canned foods, and a broader industrial food supply, in America.

Terhune's last son Albert was born December 21, 1872, on her forty-second birthday, and she referred to him as the "greatest gift" she'd received. The following year, she was diagnosed with tuberculosis, and the family moved to Europe for two years so she could recover.

Considered a "cheery, indomitable" woman, Terhune continued working and writing all of her life. When interviewers asked how she maintained her energetic pace, she frequently credited her religious devotion and her sense of humor. After she broke her wrist in her seventies, she learned to type and wrote Marion Harland's Autobiography, in which she reminisced about the pre-Civil War South where she was raised.

== Final years and death ==
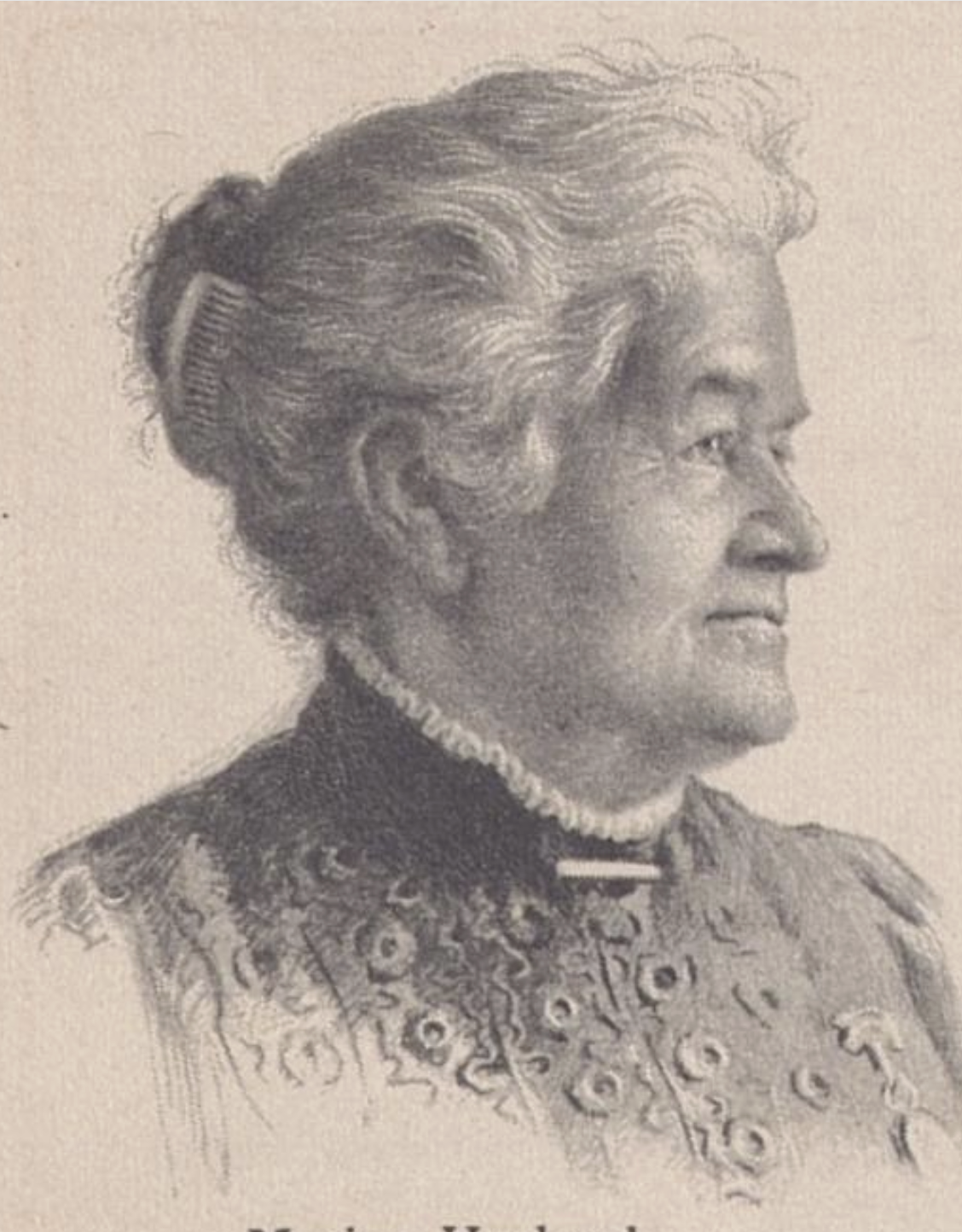
Terhune, c. 1912

The Terhunes moved to Springfield, Massachusetts, after Edward was transferred. They moved again in 1884, to Brooklyn, New York, where Edward successfully revived an ailing parish. This effort was said to cost him his own health. He died on May 25, 1907, a year after the couple celebrated their golden anniversary.

In 1919, Terhune began a new series of articles about her childhood for The Ladies Home Journal. Despite going blind at the age of 90, she continued writing by dictating to a secretary. In this way she completed numerous magazine articles and what would be her final novel, The Carringtons of High Hill.

She died on June 2, 1922, in her Manhattan, New York City, home. Her obituary was published in numerous national papers.

== Legacy and honors ==
- At the time of her death, Terhune had published twenty-five novels, twenty-five homemaking books, three volumes of short stories, and more than a dozen books on travel, colonial history, and biography, as well as numerous essays, short stories, and articles for magazines and newspapers. She passed her love of writing on to her surviving children, all of whom became writers. She co-wrote books with each of them: a cookbook with eldest daughter Christine Terhune Herrick, an etiquette book with younger daughter Virginia Van de Water, and a novel with Albert. Albert would become the most noted of her children, with his mother's drive and productivity. He is considered the most prolific author of dog stories known.
- Terhune was the first woman elected to the Virginia Historical Society.
- Active in several other historical societies, she wrote the "Story of Virginia" for a volume of state histories.
- Terhune was honored with the erection of a historical marker in Amelia Courthouse, dedicated by the Virginia Department of Historic Resources in 1998.
- In 2006 the Library of Virginia named Terhune one of its annual Virginia Women in History.

== Writing style and themes ==
Terhune's first writings, written under a more masculine pseudonym when she was 14, were evangelical essays for the Watchman and Observer, a weekly religious paper. Starting with the publication of her first novel, Alone, in 1855, she became one of the top-selling authors of women's fiction. Her early novels all featured a romantic story element, with many also including "sensational episodes-murders, fires, accidents, and sudden deaths." The works explored a variety of topics, with earlier works looking at the "domestic and religious lives of young women" and later works delving into depravity, alcoholism, drug addiction, and mental illness. Literary critics at the time classified her as a "plantation novelist". Since the late 20th century, critics have appraised her differently, noting that Terhune set several novels outside of the South, including two set in New York City. They also noted that she was critical of various social institutions considered acceptable in the antebellum South, including slavery and marriages between close relatives.

After her shift in the 1870s to writing more non-fiction works, Harland continued to explore contemporary issues of women in her occasional novels and short stories. Some of her best-known works in this period included The Hidden Path and Sunnybank. While other of her novels she wrote during this time were criticized for lacking believability and drawing out the heroine's suffering, Terhune is considered always to have "told a good story". Her first fourteen novels were reprinted and continued to be top sellers well after her own death in the early twentieth century.

Terhune well understood the literary market and how to write to appeal to her audience. She shifted to non-fiction in the 1870s after the end of the Civil War, when the demand for women's fiction began to decline. With her new domestic writings, she appealed to inexperienced young housewives' need to know how to cook, and to manage their households and staff. Her recipe books included a range of styles of dishes from around the country; these also responded to the differing resources of her readers. Once her domestic authority was established, Terhune became a Chautauqua lecturer, speaking primarily to women on topics of home and family. By the 1890s, her name guaranteed high sales. She had the freedom to explore other genres, and wrote biographies, travel books, and histories. These were noted as mostly anecdotal, opinion pieces with little research behind them. Toward the end of her life, Terhune wrote a syndicated advice column.

== Selected list of works ==
=== Novels ===
Four of Terhune' novels are available for reading online or download at Project Gutenberg (http://www.gutenberg.org).

- Alone (1854)
- The Hidden Path (1855)
- Moss Side (1857)
- Nemesis (1860)
- Miriam (1862)
- Marriage Through Prudential Reasons (published anonymously)
- Husks (1863)
- Sunnybank (1866)
- Ruby's Husband (1868)
- Phemie's Temptation (1869)
- At Last (1870)
- Helen Gardner's Wedding Day or Colonel Floyd's Wards (1870)
- True as Steel (1872)
- Carrying Weight (1873)
- Jessamine: A Novel (1873)
- Judith, A Chronicle of Old Virginia (1883)
- Mr. Wayt's Wife's Sister (1984)
- With the Best Intensions (1890)
- His Great Self (1892)
- The Royal Road; or, Taking Him at His Word (1894)
- When Grandmamma was New: The Story of a Virginia Childhood (1899)
- Literary Hearthstones (1902)
- The Distractions of Martha (1906)
- The Carringtons of High Hill (1919)

=== Short story collections ===
- Husbands and Homes (1865)
- Handicapped (1881)
- In Our Country: Stories of Virginia Life (1901)

=== Non-fiction ===
- Common Sense in the Household: A Manual of Practical Housewifery (1871)
- From My Youth Up (1874)
- Breakfast, Luncheon and Tea (1875)
- Loiterings in Pleasant Paths (1880)
- Eve's Daughters (1881)
- Common Sense in the Nursery (1885)
- The Story of Mary Washington (1892)
- Some Colonial Homesteads and Their Stories (1887)
- Bills of Fare for all Seasons of the Year (1889)
- House and Home (1889)
- Talks Upon Practical Subjects (1895)
- Home of the Bible: What I Saw and Heard in Palestine (1895)
- Where Ghosts Walk: The Haunts of Familiar Characters in History and Literature, Series I (1898)
- Charlotte Brontë at Home (1899)
- Hannah More (1900)
- Marion Harland's Complete Cookbook: A Practical and Exhaustive Manual of Cookery and Housekeeping (1903)
- The Housekeeper's Week (1908)
- Where Ghosts Walk: The Haunts of Familiar Characters in History and Literature, Series II (1910)
- Marion Harland's Autobiography: The Story of a Long Life (1910)
- Colonial Homesteads and Their Stories (1912)
- The Helping Hand Cook Book (1912, with Christine Terhune Herrick)
