= Albert Payson Terhune =

American author and journalist (1872–1942)

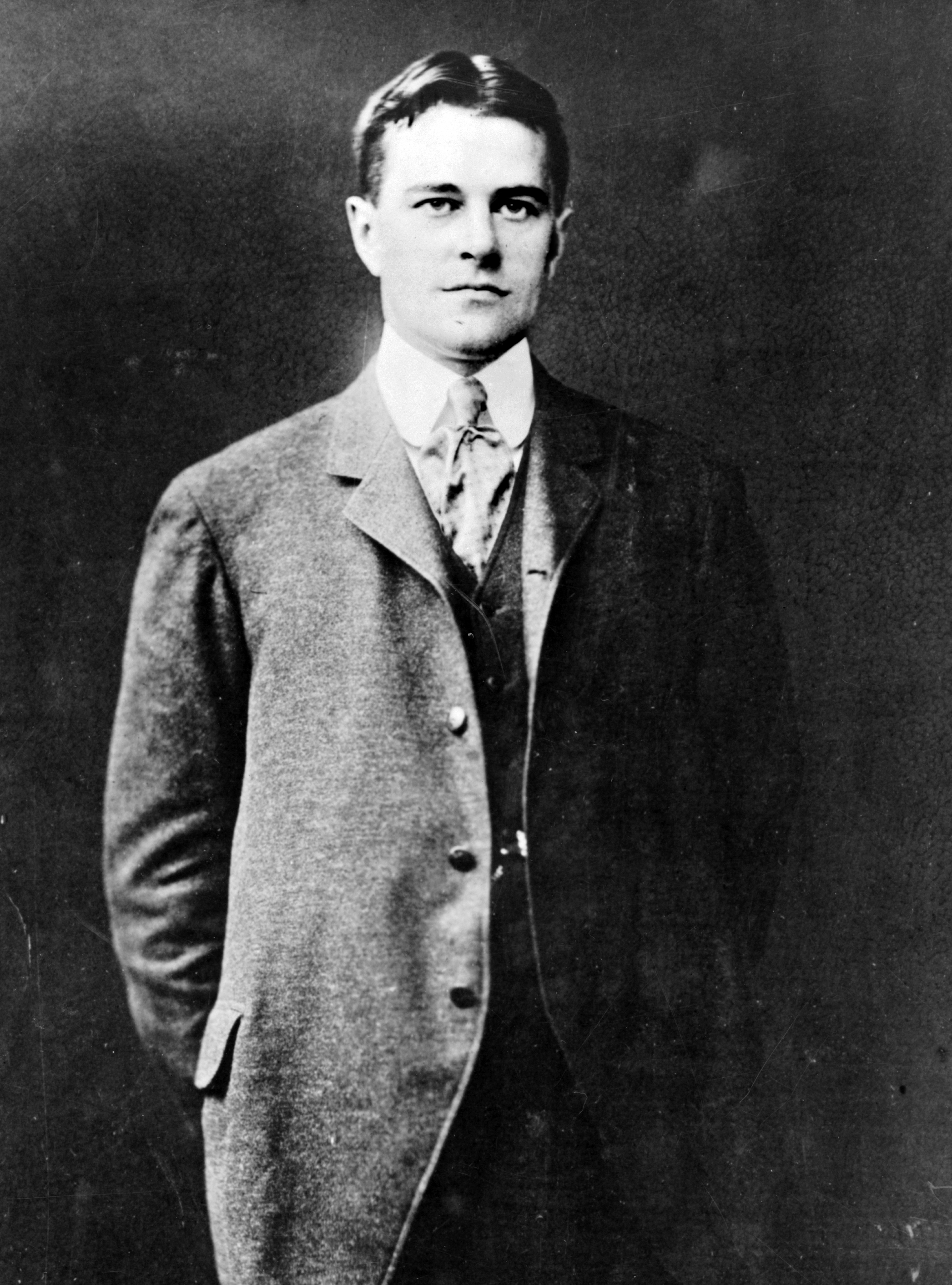
- Terhune, c. 1890–1910
- Born: December 21, 1872; Newark, New Jersey, US
- Died: February 18, 1942 (aged 69); Pompton Lakes, New Jersey, US
- Resting place: Pompton Reformed Church
- Education: Columbia University
- Occupation: Writer
- Known for: Author; Sunnybank Kennels
- Spouses: Lorraine Bryson; Anice Terhune
- Children: 1
- Parent(s): Edward Payson Terhune; Mary Virginia Hawes
- Relatives: Christine Terhune Herrick (sister)

Signature
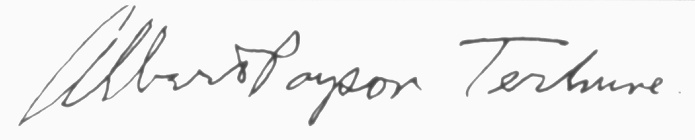

Albert Payson Terhune (December 21, 1872 – February 18, 1942) was an American writer, dog breeder, and journalist. He was popular for his novels relating the adventures of his beloved collies and as a breeder of collies at his Sunnybank Kennels, the lines of which still exist in today's Rough Collies.

== Biography ==
Albert Payson Terhune was born in New Jersey to Mary Virginia Hawes and the Reverend Edward Payson Terhune. His mother was a writer of household management books and pre-Civil War novels under the name Marion Harland. Terhune had four sisters and one brother, though only two of his sisters lived to be adults: Christine Terhune Herrick (1859–1944); and Virginia Terhune Van De Water (1865–1945).

Sunnybank (41.0012°N 74.2755°W) was originally the family's summer home, with Terhune making it his permanent residence in 1912. He was educated at Columbia University where he received a Bachelor of Arts degree in 1893. From 1894 to 1916, he worked as a reporter for The Evening World.

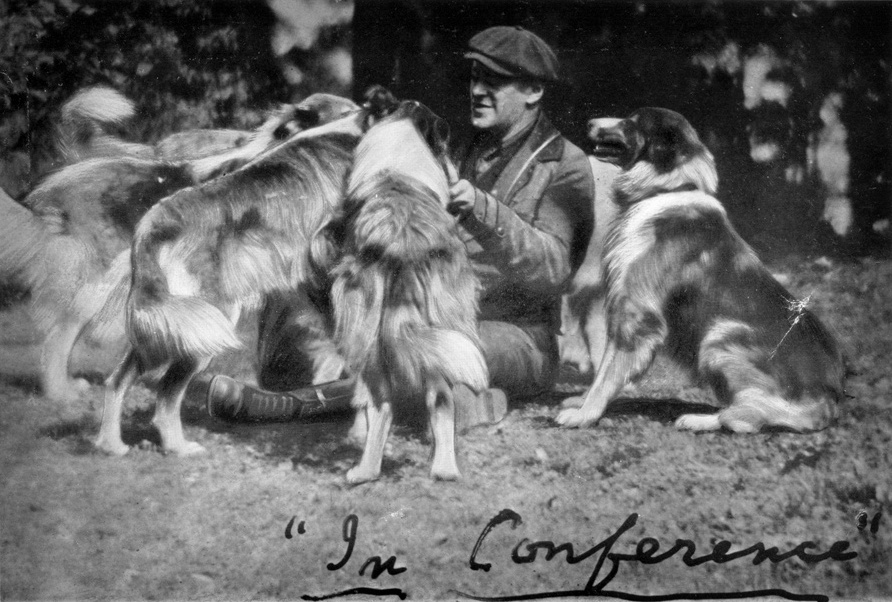
Albert Payson Terhune in conference with his Rough Collies

He boxed exhibition matches with James J. Corbett, Bob Fitzsimmons and James J. Jeffries.

His Sunnybank Kennels where he bred and raised Rough Collies were "the most famed collie kennels in the U.S."

"Bert" Terhune was an active member of the Adventurers' Club of New York.

Terhune was married twice. His first wife, Lorraine Bryson Terhune, died at the age of 23, four days after giving birth to Lorraine Virginia Terhune Stevens (1898–1956) and nine months into the marriage. He later married author and composer Anice Terhune; they never had children. He died on February 18, 1942. He was buried at the Pompton Reformed Church in Pompton Lakes, New Jersey.

== Legacy ==
His estate, Sunnybank, in Wayne, New Jersey, is maintained as Terhune Memorial Park – Sunnybank. It is open to the public and visitors can visit the graves of many of the dogs mentioned in Terhune's works and view a collection of Terhune's book and dog awards at the Van Riper-Hopper Historic House Museum. Historical and family items from the Terhune home, "The Place," can be found at the Pompton Lakes Historical Museum and the Van Riper–Hopper House Museum in Wayne, New Jersey. Albert Payson Terhune Elementary School, one of nine elementary schools in Wayne, New Jersey, is named in honor of the author. Their mascot is the collie dog. Pequannock Township, adjacent to Wayne, has a Payson Road, Terhune Ave and a Ladd Street named after him and his Canine character.

The Albert Payson Terhune Foundation was established in 1965 in New Jersey. The foundation does not maintain a website. It gives grants to organizations working with children, schools, and domesticated animals.

As a tribute to Terhune, the dog in Harlan Ellison's A Boy and His Dog, as well as the later 1975 film, calls his master Albert.

== Writing ==
Albert Payson Terhune first published short stories about his collie Lad, titled Lad Stories, in various general-interest magazines, including Red Book, Saturday Evening Post, Ladies' Home Journal, Hartford Courant, and the Atlantic Monthly. The first of his novels about his dogs, Lad: A Dog, collected a dozen stories of his collie Lad in novel form. Lad was followed by over 30 additional dog-focused novels, including two additional books about Lad. Published in 1919, the novel was a best seller in both the adult and young adult markets and has been reprinted over 80 times. It was adapted into a feature film in 1962. Terhune is now often criticized for his starkly racist depictions of the minorities, hill people and so-called "half-breeds" that peopled parts of northern New Jersey less idealized than Sunnybank.

== List of works ==
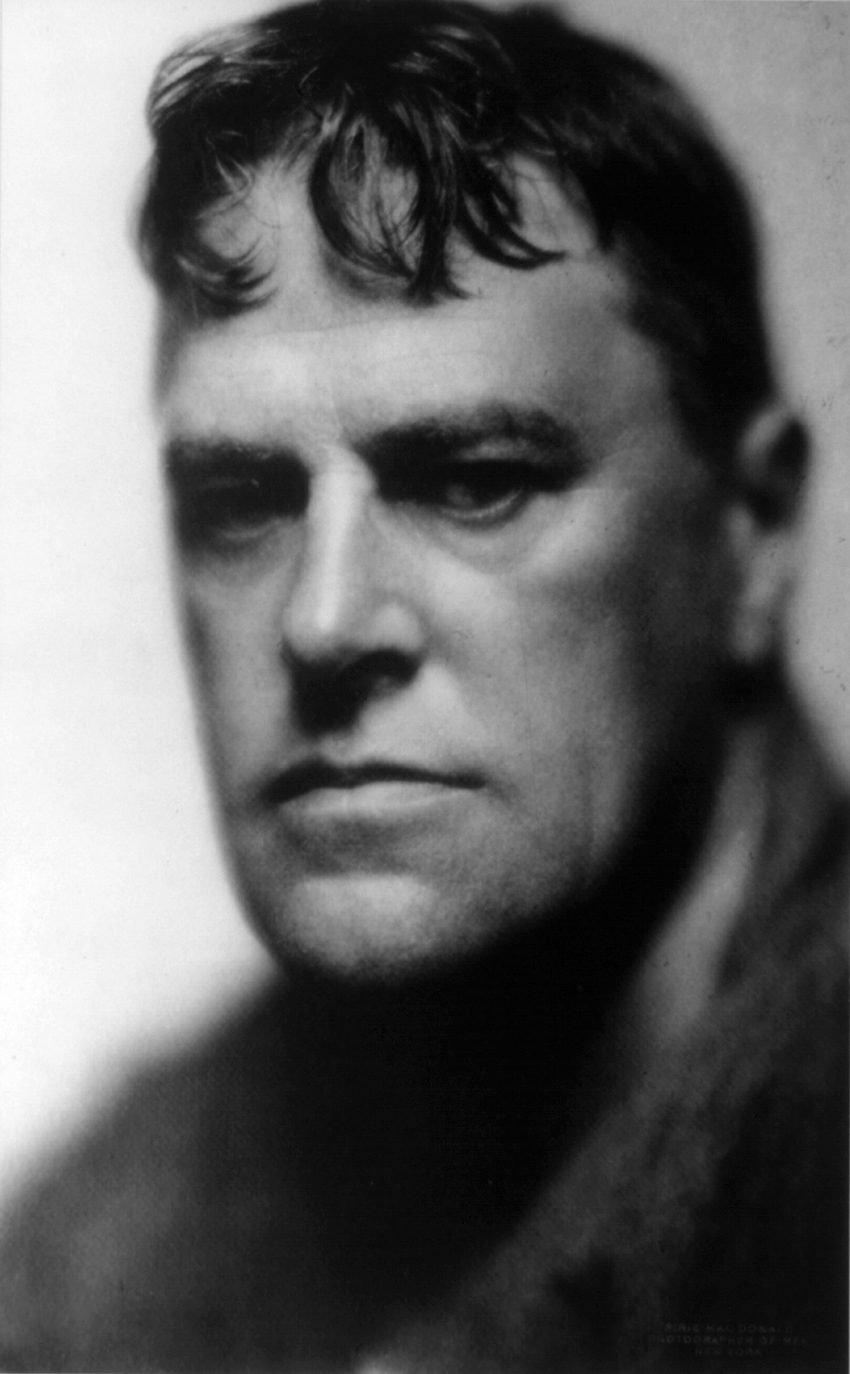
Terhune in 1922

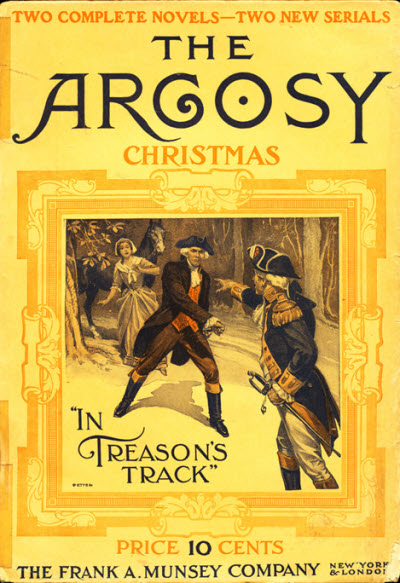
Terhune's "In Treason's Track" was the cover story for the December 1910 issue of The Argosy.

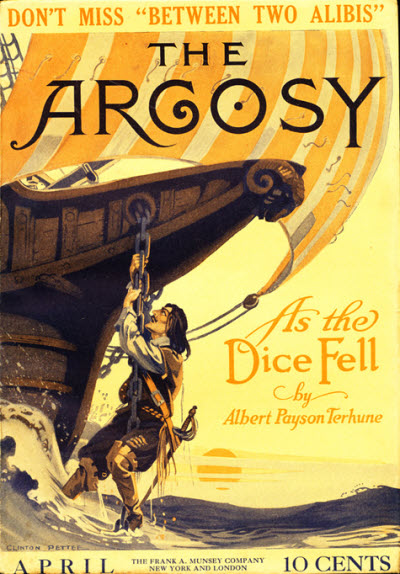
"As the Dice Fell" was originally published in The Argosy in 1912.

- Syria from the Saddle (1896)
- Columbia Stories (1897)
- How to Box to Win (1900) (written as "Terry McGovern")
- Dr. Dale: A Story Without a Moral (1900) (with Marion Harland)
- The New Mayor (1907)
- Caleb Conover, Railroader (1907)
- The World's Great Events (1908)
- The Fighter (1909)
- The Return of Peter Grimm (1912, novelization of the play by David Belasco)
- The Woman (1912)
- Famous American Indians (1912)
- Around the World in Thirty Days (1914)
- Dad (1914) (with Sinclair Lewis)
- The Story of Damon and Pythias (1915)
- The Red Circle novelization (1915)
- Superwomen (1916) republished as Famous Hussies of History (1943)
- Dollars and Cents (1917)
- The Years of the Locust (1917)
- Fortune (1918)
- Wonder Women In History (1918)
- Lad: A Dog (1919)
- Bruce (1920)
- Buff: A Collie (1921)
- The Man in the Dark (1921)
- His Dog (1922)
- Black Gold (1922)
- Black Caesar's Clan (1922)
- Further Adventures of Lad (1922) republished as Dog Stories Every Child Should Know (1941)
- The Pest (1923)
- Lochinvar Luck (1923)
- The Amateur Inn (1923)
- Grudge Mountain (1923) republished as Dog of the High Sierras (Grosset & Dunlap)
- Treve (1924)
- The Tiger's Claw (1924)
- The Heart of a Dog (1924)
- Now That I'm Fifty (1924)
- The Runaway Bag (1925)
- Wolf (1925)
- Najib (1925)
- Treasure (1926) republished as The Faith of a Collie (1949)
- My Friend the Dog (1926)
- Gray Dawn (1927)
- The Luck of the Laird (1927) republished as A Highland Collie (1950)
- Bumps (1927)
- Blundell's Last Guest (1927)
- Water! (1928)
- Black Wings (1928)
- Loot (1928) republished as Collie to the Rescue (1940)
- The Secret of Sea-Dream House (1929)
- Lad of Sunnybank (1929)
- To the Best of My Memory (1930)
- Diana Thorne's Dog Basket: A Series of Etchings (1930)
- Proving Nothing (1930)
- A Dog Named Chips (1931)
- The Son of God (1932)
- The Dog Book (1932)
- The Way of a Dog (1932)
- Letters of Marque (1934)
- The Book of Sunnybank (1934) republished as Sunnybank: Home of Lad (1953)
- Real Tales of Real Dogs (1935)
- True Dog Stories (1936)
- The Critter and Other Dogs (1936)
- Unseen! (1937)
- The Terhune Omnibus (1937) republished as The Best-Loved Dog Stories of Albert Payson Terhune (1954)
- A Book of Famous Dogs (1937) republished as Famous Dog Stories Every Child Should Know (1937)
- Grudge Mountain (1939) republished as Dog of the High Sierras (1951)
- Dogs (1940)
- Loot! (1940) republished as Collie to the Rescue (1952)
- Across the Line (1945) (with notes and commentary by Anice Terhune)
- Wallace: Glasgow's Immortal Fire Dog (1961)
- Great Dog Stories (1994) five stories from The Heart of a Dog and five stories from My Friend the Dog

== In popular culture ==
- Terhune was mentioned in Crockett Johnson's Barnaby.
- Terhune was mentioned twice in Charles M. Schulz's Lil' Folks and once in Peanuts, and may have been the template for Snoopy's Daisy Hill Puppy Farm
- Terhune is mentioned in Roger Zelazny's This Immortal and thanked in the dedication of A Night in the Lonesome October.
- "Albert" is used by Blood, a telepathic dog, to mock his young adult companion Vic in the film A Boy and His Dog. It remains unexplained why Blood says it in the film itself, though it was elaborated on by Harlan Ellison, author of the story the movie is based on, that it's in reference to Terhune.
- The young protagonist of Edward Bunker's semi-autobiographical novel about troubled youth, Little Boy Blue, mentions more than once that he enjoys reading books about Collie dogs written by Albert Payson Terhune. See chapters 6 and 8.
- Terhune is mentioned in the first chapter of Andy Rooney's book My War, 1997 (ISBN 0-517-17986-5) with: "I couldn’t have been more surprised, as my friend Charlie Slocum used to say, if I'd seen Albert Payson Terhune kick a collie."
- “You— Albert Payson Terhune, you!” said mockingly to her kept man Joey by his wealthy patroness Vera, as she disparages his relationship with the other woman Linda, a dog-lover, in the musical Pal Joey by John O’Hara.
