= Christine Terhune Herrick =

American writer (1859–1944)

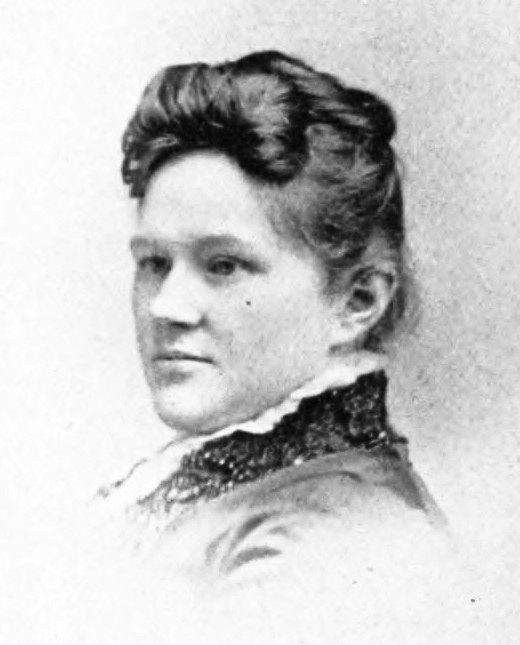
- Herrick photo published in 1893
- Born: Christine Terhune; June 13, 1859; Newark, New Jersey
- Died: December 2, 1944 (aged 85); Washington, D.C.
- Occupation: Writer
- Spouse: James Frederick Herrick
- Children: Horace Terhune Herrick; James Frederic Herrick
- Parent(s): Edward Payson Terhune; Mary Virginia Terhune

Christine Terhune Herrick (June 13, 1859 – December 2, 1944) was an American writer who wrote mostly about housekeeping. She published articles in Harper's Bazaar and was also a journalist.

== Biography ==
Herrick was born in Newark, New Jersey on June 13, 1859. She was the eldest daughter of the writers Edward Payson Terhune and Mary Virginia Hawes Terhune.

She married James Frederick Herrick (1851–1893), an editor of the Springfield Republican, in 1884. They had three children; Horace Terhune Herrick (1887–1948), James Frederic Herrick, and a toddler daughter who died at age 3.

She published her first article in the first issue of Good Housekeeping in 1885. Her husband died in 1893 of typhoid fever, but she was able to support herself and her two young sons through her writing.

Around 1890, she built a home in Pompton Lakes, New Jersey she called The Outlook, where she resided for 13 years.

She died on December 2, 1944, in Washington, D.C.

== Legacy ==
She wrote over thirty books on housekeeping, childcare and cooking. Herrick also published magazine articles and wrote a book with her mother.

== Publications ==
- Housekeeping Made Easy (Harpers, 1888)
- Cradle and Nursery (Harpers, 1889)
- Liberal Living Upon Narrow Means (Houghton, Mifflin, 1890)
- What to Eat, How to Serve It (Harpers, 1891)
- The Little Dinner (Scribners, 1892)
- Chafing – Dish Suppers (Scribners, 1894)
- The Cottage Kitchen (Scribners, 1895)
- The National Cook Book (Scribners, 1896)
- The Home Book for Mothers and Daughters (Christian Herald, 1897)
- The New Idea Home and Cook Book (Blanchard, 1900)
- First Aid to the Young Housekeeper (Scribners, 1900)
- In City Tents (Putnam, 1902)
- Hospitality at Small Expense (Clode, 1904)
- The Expert Maid – Servant (Harpers, 1904)
- The Consolidated Library of Modern Cooking and Household Recipes (Bodmer, 1904)
- The Lewis Carroll Birthday Book (Wessels, 1905)
- Sunday Night Suppers (Estes, 1907)
- The Cooking School (Anderson & Stoner, 1908)
- Like Mother Used to Make (Estes, 1912)
- The Helping Hand Cook Book (Moffat, Yard, 1912)
- My Boy and I (Estes, 1913)
- Candy Making (Rand, McNally, 1913)
- Candy Making in the Home (Rand McNally, 1914)
- The ABC of Housekeeping (Harpers, 1915)
- The ABC of Cooking (Harpers, 1916)
- Lose Weight and Be Well (Harpers, 1917)
- Letters of the Duke of Wellington to Miss J (Unwin, 1924)
- Feed The Brute (Stokes, 1926)
- The New Common Sense in the Household (Stokes, 1926)
- Smart Supper Recipes (Page, 1928)
