= Ramapo =

Ramapo (occasionally spelled Ramapough) is the name of several places and institutions in northern New Jersey and southeastern New York State. They were named after the Ramapough, a band of the Lenape Indians who migrated into the area from Connecticut by the seventeenth and early eighteenth centuries.

== Places ==
=== New Jersey ===
- Ramapo Valley County Reservation, a Bergen County park
- Ramapo Mountain State Forest, in Bergen and Passaic Counties
  - Ramapo Lake
- Ramapo College of New Jersey, a public college in Mahwah

=== New York ===
- Ramapo, New York, a town in Rockland County
- Ramapo Central School District, serves the village of Suffern, and surrounding areas in the town of Ramapo
- Ramapo High School (New York), in Ramapo
- East Ramapo Central School District, serves the village of Spring Valley and surrounding areas in the town of Ramapo

=== New Jersey and New York ===
- Ramapo Mountains
- Ramapo River

== Educational institutions ==
- Ramapo College, in Mahwah, New Jersey, United States
- Ramapo High School (New Jersey), in Franklin Lakes, New Jersey, United States
- Ramapo Indian Hills Regional High School District, in Bergen County, New Jersey, United States

== Other uses ==
- Golden v. Planning Board of Ramapo, a 1971 land use planning case
- Hotel Ramapo, now called Taft Hotel, a historic residential hotel in Portland, Oregon
- Ramapo Fault, in New York, New Jersey, and Pennsylvania
- Ramapough Mountain Indians, or Ramapough Lenape Nation, a New Jersey state-recognized tribe
- USS Ramapo, a United States Navy oiler in commission from 1919 to 1946
