= Pompton Lakes, New Jersey =

Borough in Passaic County, New Jersey, US

- Borough
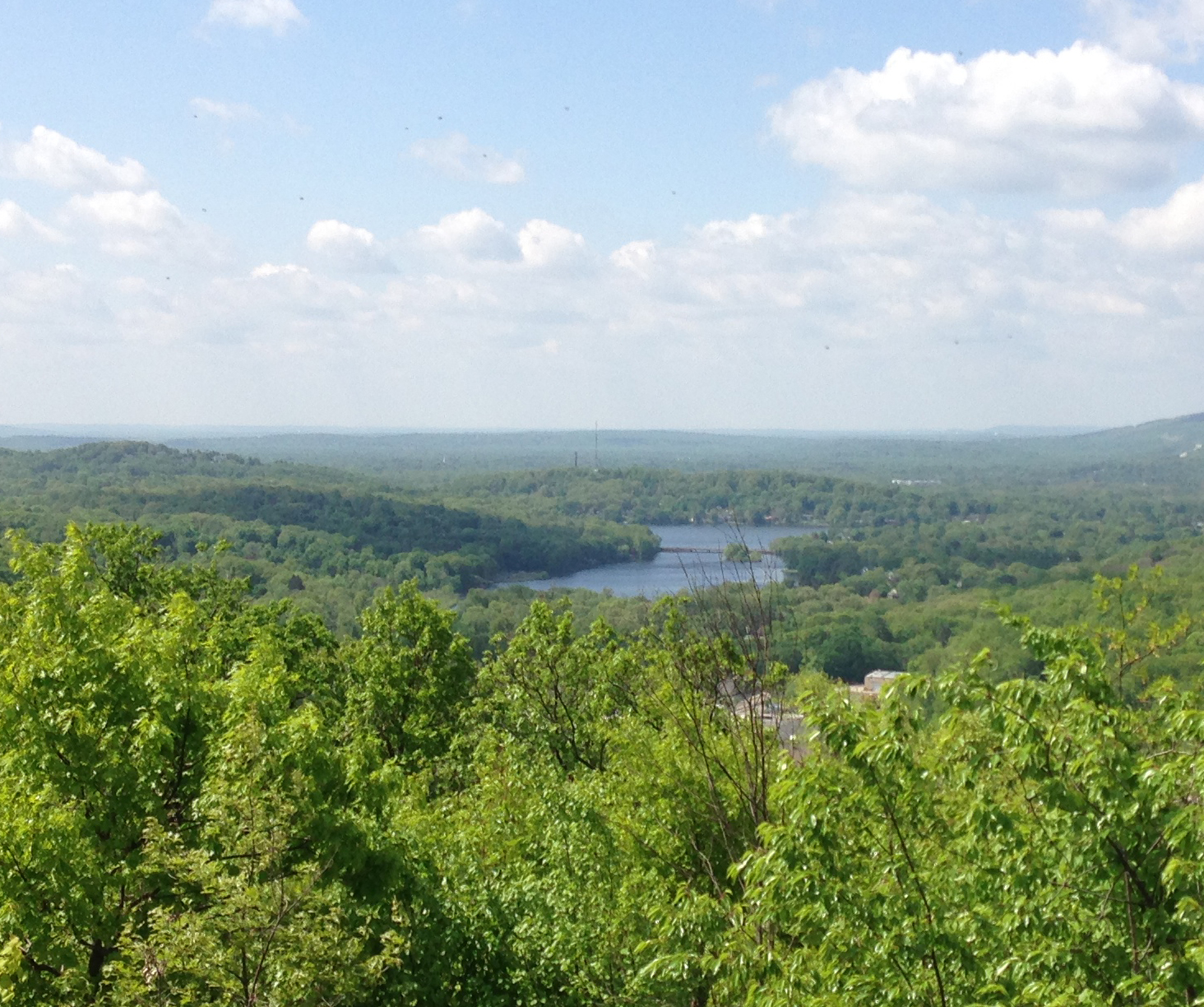
- Pompton Lake viewed from Ramapo Mountain State Forest

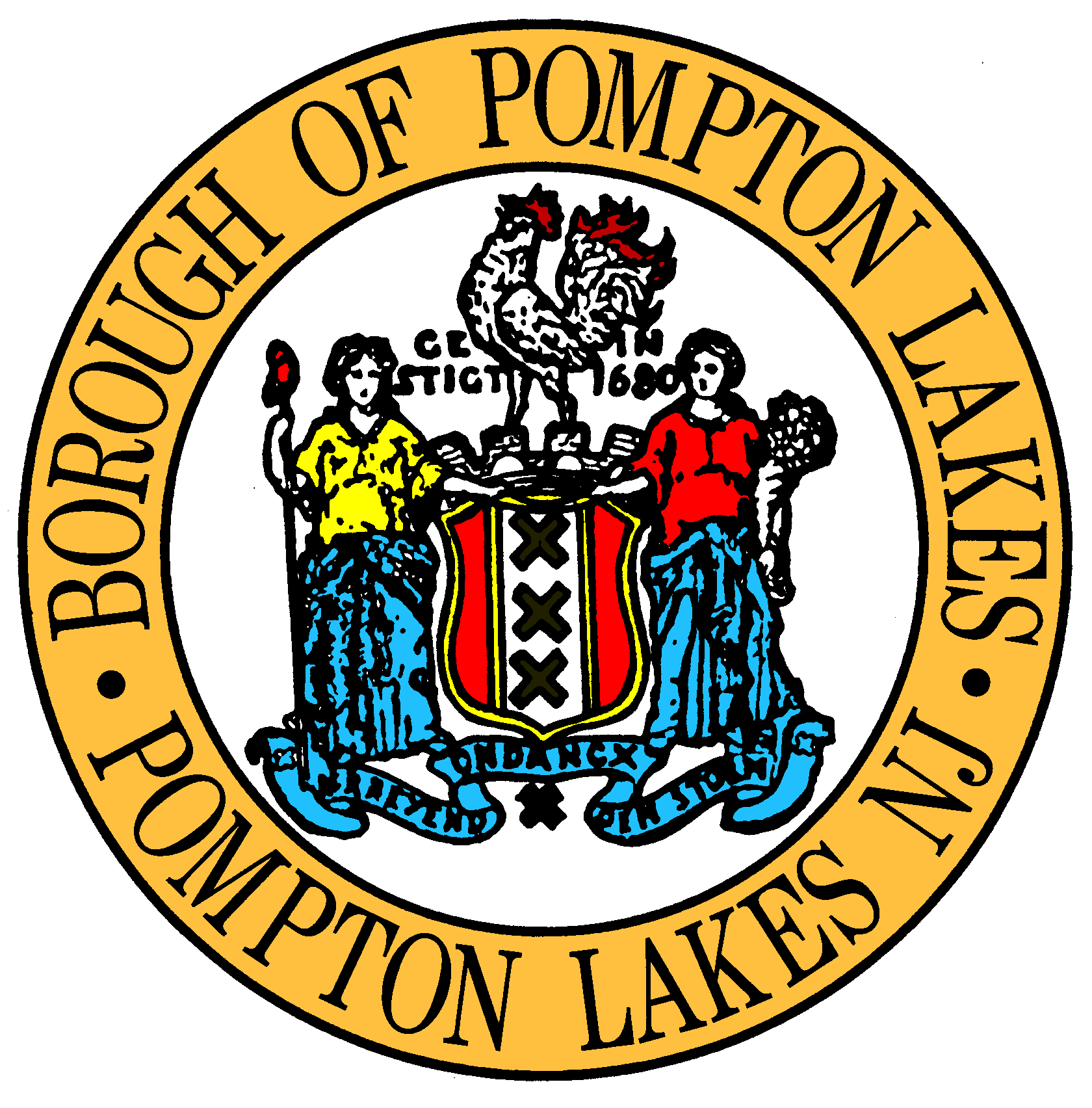
- Seal Logo

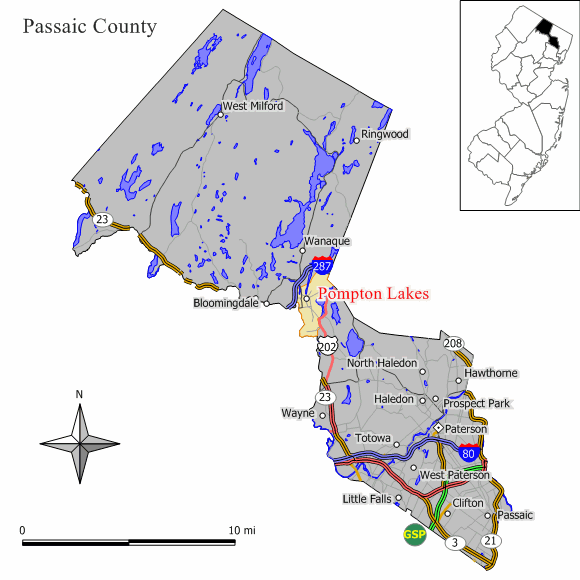
- Map of Pompton Lakes in Passaic County. Inset: Location of Passaic County highlighted in the State of New Jersey.

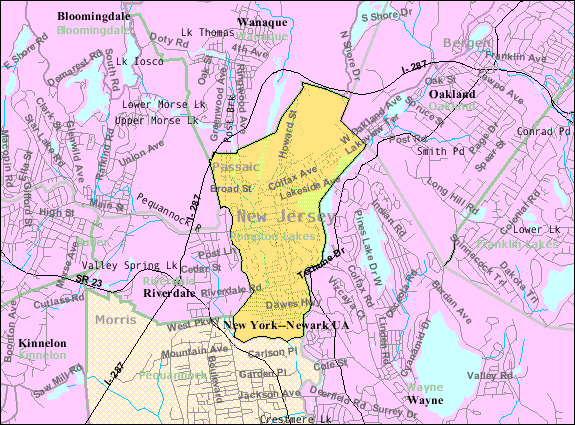
- Census Bureau map of Pompton Lakes, New Jersey

- Location in Passaic County Location in New Jersey Location in the United States
- Coordinates: 41.002734°N 74.286742°W
- Country: United States
- State: New Jersey
- County: Passaic
- Founded: 1682
- Incorporated: February 26, 1895

Government
  - Type: Borough
  - Body: Borough Council
  - Mayor: Michael A. Serra (R, term ends December 31, 2023)
  - Administrator: Michael Carelli
  - Municipal clerk: Elizabeth Brandsness

Area
  - Total: 3.16 sq mi (8.19 km^{2})
  - Land: 2.89 sq mi (7.48 km^{2})
  - Water: 0.27 sq mi (0.71 km^{2}) 8.67%
  - Rank: 327th of 565 in state 12th of 16 in county
- Elevation: 217 ft (66 m)

Population (2020)
  - Total: 11,127
  - Estimate (2024): 11,156
  - Rank: 223rd of 565 in state 11th of 16 in county
  - Density: 3,854.2/sq mi (1,488.1/km^{2})
  - Rank: 169th of 565 in state 9th of 16 in county
- Time zone: UTC−05:00 (Eastern (EST))
  - Summer (DST): UTC−04:00 (Eastern (EDT))
- ZIP Code: 07442
- Area code: 973
- FIPS code: 3403160090
- GNIS feature ID: 0885359
- Website: www.pomptonlakes-nj.gov

Pompton Lakes is a borough in Passaic County, in the U.S. state of New Jersey. As of the 2020 United States census, the borough's population was 11,127, an increase of 30 (+0.3%) from the 2010 census count of 11,097, which in turn reflected an increase of 457 (+4.3%) from the 10,640 counted in the 2000 census.

Pompton Lakes was established on February 26, 1895, from portions of Pompton Township, based on the results of a referendum held three days earlier. The borough was named for the Pompton people, a sub-tribe of Native Americans who lived in the area. It was the first borough to be formed in Passaic County as part of the "boroughitis" that had struck the state at the time. Pompton Lakes did not acquire territory from more than one township, which would have entitled the borough to a seat on the County's Board of Chosen Freeholders.

An outer-ring suburb of New York City, Pompton Lakes is located approximately 20 miles (32 km) northwest of Midtown Manhattan. From the higher mountains in and around the borough one can see the New York skyline. Three rivers, the Ramapo, Pequannock and Wanaque, run through the borough, which historically provided much of the energy for various industries in the borough. In the mid-20th century, Pompton Lakes served as a local shopping destination, but lost its status as shopping malls opened in the area in the 1970s and 1980s.

== History ==
Dutch settlers began to settle in the area that is now Pompton Lakes in the 1680s, purchasing farmland from the local Lenape Native Americans.

The presence of iron ore and the availability of hydropower were initial catalysts for the early development of the Pompton area. An ironworks was constructed in the early 1700s on the Ramapo River at the site of the current Pompton Lake dam, which produced munitions for the French and Indian War, the Revolutionary War, and the War of 1812.

Pompton was situated along the main north–south route during the Revolutionary War, and as such the Continental Army passed through often. Casparus Schuyler, a member of the prominent Schuyler family, owned a tavern in the town that became known as the Yellow Tavern or the Yellow Cottage, and the various army encampments in the area supplied much of the business.

General George Washington and his army stayed in the Pompton area twice during the course of the war, and he visited the Yellow Tavern both times. He first visited on July 11, 1777, when he met with local ironmaster Robert Erskine at the tavern. François-Jean de Chastellux, a major general in the French Expeditionary Force led by General Rochambeau, visited the Yellow Tavern on his way from Philadelphia to New England in December 1780, and remarked on his experience there in an account published later. Washington returned to the tavern on March 30, 1782, as he traveled north with his wife Martha. During this time, it was serving as the winter headquarters of Colonel Phillip Van Cortlandt. The tavern was torn down around 1900 to widen the adjacent road, and the site is noted by a historical marker.

Pompton Township was formed shortly after the Revolution, in 1797. During the Civil War, knives, saws, nails, and springs for railroad cars were manufactured at the Pompton Ironworks. The Morris Canal, completed in 1832, was linked to the town via the Pompton Feeder, which barges used to supply coal to blast furnaces. Despite this, Pompton remained predominantly rural through the 19th century, and various summer resorts around Pompton Lake served vacationing New Yorkers. The New York, Susquehanna and Western Railroad opened a local train station in the late 1870s, driving further development in the town. In 1895, Pompton Lakes voted to split from Pompton Township, and the borough was officially incorporated on February 26 of that year.

The population of Pompton Lakes increased during the early 1900s, due to the rapid growth of local employers like the German Artistic Weaving Company and the Smith Powder Works. The latter company was purchased in 1905 by E.I. du Pont de Nemours and Company and formed the basis of the DuPont Pompton Lakes Works, which operated in the borough until 1994.

In 1923, Joseph "Doc" Bier opened a "health farm" in Pompton Lakes, where boxers such as Pancho Villa and Jimmy McLarnin trained. In 1935, Joe Louis began training at the camp, and continued to use the camp until his retirement in 1949. He prepared for his famed bout with Max Schmeling there, and often invited local children to watch him practice. During his time in the borough he held boxing exhibitions at the camp to raise $2,600 for the purchase of an ambulance and an additional $2,000 to help build a police communications tower. The camp closed in the 1950s.

In 1938, Reaction Motors successfully designed and perfected the world's first regenerative cooling rocket at a basement laboratory in a building in downtown Pompton Lakes. The technology they invented made liquid-fueled rockets capable of burning for long enough periods to be practical, and all future liquid-fueled rockets would build off this technology. The company tested this rocket at Lake Inez in the borough, not far from the laboratory it was built in.

Decades-old industrial pollution and its connection to cancer and other illness among residents in a section of the borough was the subject of a week-long front-page investigative series in The Record newspaper in February 2018. The four-part series documented ground and water pollution that has impacted hundreds of homes surrounding a DuPont munitions plant that had operated for decades in the area, and the impact on the health of nearby residents exposed to the pollutants.

== Geography ==
According to the United States Census Bureau, the borough had a total area of 3.16 square miles (8.19 km^{2}), including 2.89 square miles (7.48 km^{2}) of land and 0.27 square miles (0.71 km^{2}) of water (8.67%).

The borough borders the municipalities of Bloomingdale, Wanaque and Wayne in Passaic County; Oakland in Bergen County; and Riverdale and Pequannock in Morris County.

Much of the borough sits in a valley formed by the confluence of the Ramapo, Pequannock, and Wanaque rivers, which leads to common flooding events, the most recent of which was in 2011. A few taller hills ring the valley, including Federal Hill, which is notable as the site of the Pompton Mutiny, a revolt of Continental Army troops that occurred there on January 20, 1781, under the command of Colonel Israel Shreve.

== Demographics ==
Historical population
Census	Pop.	Note	%±
1900	847		—
1910	1,060		25.1%
1920	2,008		89.4%
1930	3,104		54.6%
1940	3,189		2.7%
1950	4,654		45.9%
1960	9,445		102.9%
1970	11,397		20.7%
1980	10,660		−6.5%
1990	10,539		−1.1%
2000	10,640		1.0%
2010	11,097		4.3%
2020	11,127		0.3%
2024 (est.)	11,156	▲	0.3%
Population sources: 1900–1920; 1900–1910 1910–1930; 1940–2000 2000; 2010 2020

=== 2020 census ===
As of the 2020 census, Pompton Lakes had a population of 11,127. The median age was 41.5 years. 20.2% of residents were under the age of 18 and 15.4% of residents were 65 years of age or older. For every 100 females there were 95.0 males, and for every 100 females age 18 and over there were 92.3 males.

100.0% of residents lived in urban areas, while 0.0% lived in rural areas.

There were 4,200 households in Pompton Lakes, of which 31.0% had children under the age of 18 living in them. Of all households, 50.6% were married-couple households, 16.6% were households with a male householder and no spouse or partner present, and 26.8% were households with a female householder and no spouse or partner present. About 26.6% of all households were made up of individuals and 11.8% had someone living alone who was 65 years of age or older.

There were 4,349 housing units, of which 3.4% were vacant. The homeowner vacancy rate was 0.8% and the rental vacancy rate was 4.5%.

Racial composition as of the 2020 census
Race	Number	Percent
White	8,170	73.4%
Black or African American	217	2.0%
American Indian and Alaska Native	73	0.7%
Asian	613	5.5%
Native Hawaiian and Other Pacific Islander	2	0.0%
Some other race	957	8.6%
Two or more races	1,095	9.8%
Hispanic or Latino (of any race)	2,174	19.5%

=== 2010 census ===
The 2010 United States census counted 11,097 people, 4,190 households, and 2,933 families in the borough. The population density was 3,809.1 per square mile (1,470.7/km^{2}). There were 4,341 housing units at an average density of 1,490.1 per square mile (575.3/km^{2}). The racial makeup was 87.93% (9,758) White, 1.41% (157) Black or African American, 0.11% (12) Native American, 5.39% (598) Asian, 0.02% (2) Pacific Islander, 3.37% (374) from other races, and 1.77% (196) from two or more races. Hispanic or Latino of any race were 10.89% (1,209) of the population.

Of the 4,190 households, 31.6% had children under the age of 18; 56.0% were married couples living together; 10.4% had a female householder with no husband present and 30.0% were non-families. Of all households, 24.7% were made up of individuals and 9.8% had someone living alone who was 65 years of age or older. The average household size was 2.64 and the average family size was 3.20.

22.2% of the population were under the age of 18, 7.6% from 18 to 24, 27.8% from 25 to 44, 29.8% from 45 to 64, and 12.7% who were 65 years of age or older. The median age was 40.2 years. For every 100 females, the population had 93.9 males. For every 100 females ages 18 and older there were 90.9 males.

The Census Bureau's 2006–2010 American Community Survey showed that (in 2010 inflation-adjusted dollars) median household income was $88,352 (with a margin of error of +/− $7,890) and the median family income was $97,074 (+/− $10,183). Males had a median income of $61,426 (+/− $7,225) versus $50,203 (+/− $4,456) for females. The per capita income for the borough was $35,872 (+/− $3,011). About 2.0% of families and 2.3% of the population were below the poverty line, including 1.7% of those under age 18 and 6.7% of those age 65 or over.

Same-sex couples headed 29 households in 2010, almost double the 15 counted in 2000.

=== 2000 census ===
As of the 2000 United States census there were 10,640 people, 3,949 households, and 2,803 families residing in the borough. The population density was 3,585.7 inhabitants per square mile (1,384.4/km^{2}). There were 4,024 housing units at an average density of 1,356.1 per square mile (523.6/km^{2}). The racial makeup of the borough was 93.01% White, 1.21% African American, 0.19% Native American, 3.03% Asian, 0.01% Pacific Islander, 1.57% from other races, and 0.99% from two or more races. Hispanic or Latino of any race were 5.74% of the population.

There were 3,949 households, out of which 33.7% had children under the age of 18 living with them, 57.8% were married couples living together, 10.1% had a female householder with no husband present, and 29.0% were non-families. 23.8% of all households were made up of individuals, and 10.8% had someone living alone who was 65 years of age or older. The average household size was 2.69 and the average family size was 3.24.

In the borough the population was spread out, with 24.2% under the age of 18, 6.7% from 18 to 24, 33.0% from 25 to 44, 22.6% from 45 to 64, and 13.4% who were 65 years of age or older. The median age was 37 years. For every 100 females, there were 92.7 males. For every 100 females age 18 and over, there were 89.6 males.

The median income for a household in the borough was $65,648, and the median income for a family was $74,701. Males had a median income of $46,776 versus $38,221 for females. The per capita income for the borough was $26,802. About 1.6% of families and 3.2% of the population were below the poverty line, including 4.0% of those under age 18 and 6.1% of those age 65 or over.

== Arts and culture ==
The 1997 comedy In & Out, starring Kevin Kline, Tom Selleck and Joan Cusack, was partially filmed at Pompton Lakes High School.

The 2014 independent short film Simpler Times, written and directed by Pompton Lakes native Steve Monarque and starring Jerry Stiller and Anne Meara, was filmed in downtown Pompton Lakes.

The 2023 documentary film Flipside, directed and co-written by Chris Wilcha, was partially based upon, and filmed at, the eponymous record store in downtown Pompton Lakes.

== Parks and recreation ==
The southern portion of Ramapo Mountain State Forest lies within the northernmost area of Pompton Lakes, and the park's Cannonball Trail begins in the borough. There are also six municipal parks: Hershfield Park, Stiles Park, Gallo-Pacifico Park, Lakeside Park, Rotary Park, and John Murrin Park.

The Joe Louis Memorial features a granite monument dedicated to the boxer who lived and trained in the borough for a time.

Pompton Lakes and Riverdale share their youth sports teams. The Pompton Lakes-Riverdale Little League (PLRLL) runs youth tee-ball, baseball and softball leagues, while the Pompton Lakes-Riverdale Youth Organization (PLRYO) runs football, lacrosse and cheerleading, and the Pompton Lakes-Riverdale Soccer Association (PLRSA) runs the soccer teams. The Pompton Lakes Recreation Department also runs an annual summer day camp at Hershfield Park, as well as special programs including art classes and karate lessons.

== Government ==
=== Local government ===
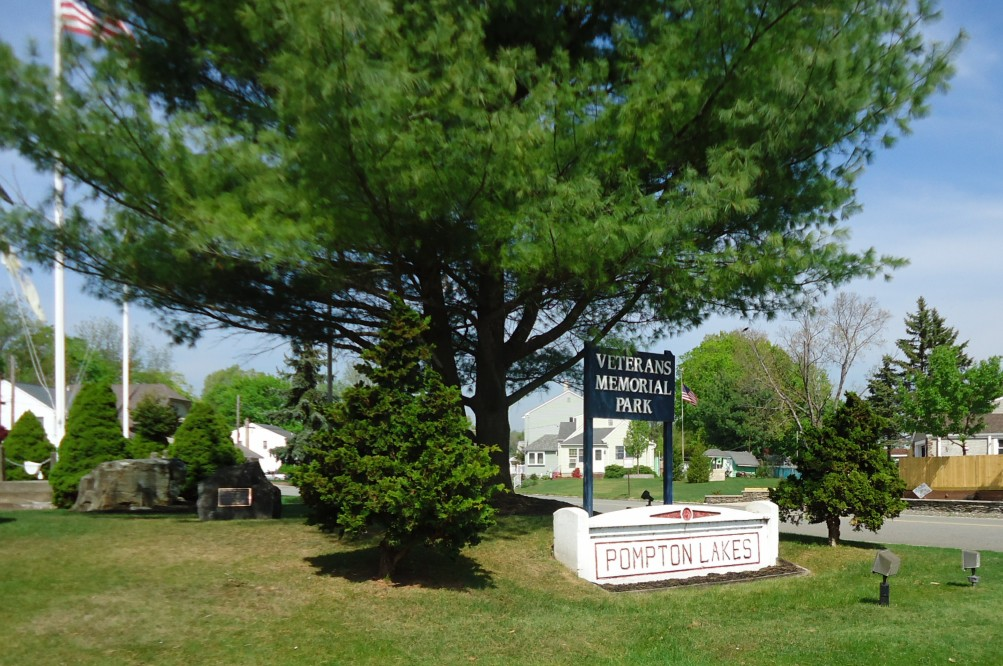
Veterans Memorial Park.

Pompton Lakes is governed under the borough form of New Jersey municipal government, which is used in 218 municipalities (of the 564) statewide, making it the most common form of government in New Jersey. The governing body is comprised of the mayor and the borough council, with all positions elected at-large on a partisan basis as part of the November general election. The mayor is elected directly by the voters to a four-year term of office. The borough council includes six members elected to serve three-year terms on a staggered basis, with two seats coming up for election each year in a three-year cycle. The borough form of government used by Pompton Lakes is a "weak mayor / strong council" government in which council members act as the legislative body with the mayor presiding at meetings and voting only in the event of a tie. The mayor can veto ordinances subject to an override by a two-thirds majority vote of the council. The mayor makes committee and liaison assignments for council members, and most appointments are made by the mayor with the advice and consent of the council.

As of 2023, the mayor of Pompton Lakes is Republican Michael A. Serra, whose term of office ends December 31, 2027. Members of the Borough Council are Lisa Kihlberg (R, 2025), Robert Cruz (R, 2027), Ranuel Hinton IV (R, 2027), Maria Kent (R, 2026), Jennifer Polidori (R, 2025) and Ekamon "Ek" Venin (R, 2026).

In July 2018, Jennifer Polidori was selected from a list of three candidates nominated by the Republican municipal committee to fill the seat expiring in December 2019 that had been held by Christian Baranco until he resigned from office earlier that month as he was moving out of the borough; Polidori served on an interim basis until the November 2018 general election, when voters selected a candidate to serve the balance of the term.

=== Federal, state, and county representation ===
Pompton Lakes is located in the 9th congressional district and is part of New Jersey's 26th state legislative district.

For the 119th United States Congress, New Jersey's 9th congressional district is represented by Nellie Pou (D, North Haledon) New Jersey is represented in the United States Senate by Democrats Cory Booker (Newark, term ends 2027) and Andy Kim (Moorestown, term ends 2031).

For the 2026–2027 session, the 26th legislative district of the New Jersey Legislature is represented in the State Senate by Joseph Pennacchio (R, Rockaway Township) and in the General Assembly by Brian Bergen (R, Denville Township) and Jay Webber (R, Morris Plains).

Passaic County is governed by a Board of County Commissioners, comprised of seven members who are elected at-large to staggered three-year terms office on a partisan basis, with two or three seats coming up for election each year as part of the November general election in a three-year cycle. At a reorganization meeting held in January, the board selects a Director and Deputy Director from among its members to serve for a one-year term. As of 2026, Passaic County's Commissioners are: Director Cassandra "Sandi" Lazzara (D), Little Falls, term as commissioner ends December 31, 2027; term as director ends 2026), Deputy Director Orlando Cruz (D, Paterson, term as commissioner and as deputy director ends 2026), Rodney DeVore (D, Paterson, 2027), Bruce James (D, Clifton, 2026) Michael Ramaglia (D, West Milford, 2028), Christina Schratz (D, Passaic, 2028) and Nick Veliky (D, Clifton, appointed to a term ending in 2027).

Constitutional officers, elected on a countywide basis, are County Clerk Danielle Ireland-Imhof (D, Hawthorne, 2028), Sheriff Thomas Adamo (D, Wayne, 2027) and Surrogate Zoila S. Cassanova (D, Wayne, 2026).

=== Highlands protection ===
In 2004, the New Jersey Legislature passed the Highlands Water Protection and Planning Act, which regulates the New Jersey Highlands region. Pompton Lakes was included in the highlands preservation area and is subject to the rules of the act and the Highlands Water Protection and Planning Council, a division of the New Jersey Department of Environmental Protection. None of the territory in the protected region is classified as being in the highlands preservation area, and so is not subject to the additional rules that would entail.

=== Politics ===
As of March 2011, there were a total of 7,357 registered voters in Pompton Lakes, of which 1,726 (23.5% vs. 31.0% countywide) were registered as Democrats, 2,006 (27.3% vs. 18.7%) were registered as Republicans and 3,623 (49.2% vs. 50.3%) were registered as Unaffiliated. There were 2 voters registered to other parties. Among the borough's 2010 Census population, 66.3% (vs. 53.2% in Passaic County) were registered to vote, including 85.2% of those ages 18 and over (vs. 70.8% countywide).

Gubernatorial election results for Pompton Lakes
Year	Republican		Democratic		Third party(ies)	
Year	No.	%	No.	%	No.	%
2025	2,303	50.49%	2,241	49.13%	17	0.37%
2021	2,146	59.83%	1,420	39.59%	21	0.59%
2017	1,462	50.22%	1,385	47.58%	64	2.20%
2013	1,968	65.89%	985	32.98%	34	1.14%
2009	1,848	53.13%	1,389	39.94%	241	6.93%
2005	1,571	46.67%	1,693	50.30%	102	3.03%

In the 2012 presidential election, Republican Mitt Romney received 49.6% of the vote (2,418 cast), ahead of Democrat Barack Obama with 49.1% (2,396 votes), and other candidates with 1.3% (63 votes), among the 4,923 ballots cast by the borough's 7,536 registered voters (46 ballots were spoiled), for a turnout of 65.3%. In the 2008 presidential election, Republican John McCain received 2,803 votes (50.6% vs. 37.7% countywide), ahead of Democrat Barack Obama with 2,567 votes (46.3% vs. 58.8%) and other candidates with 53 votes (1.0% vs. 0.8%), among the 5,541 ballots cast by the borough's 7,587 registered voters, for a turnout of 73.0% (vs. 70.4% in Passaic County). In the 2004 presidential election, Republican George W. Bush received 2,847 votes (53.9% vs. 42.7% countywide), ahead of Democrat John Kerry with 2,330 votes (44.1% vs. 53.9%) and other candidates with 45 votes (0.9% vs. 0.7%), among the 5,283 ballots cast by the borough's 7,217 registered voters, for a turnout of 73.2% (vs. 69.3% in the whole county).

Presidential elections results
Year	Republican	Democratic	Third Parties
2024	55.7% 3,361	42.0% 2,537	2.3% 125
2020	52.1% 3,365	45.2% 2,920	2.7% 99
2016	52.9% 2,797	43.1% 2,276	3.2% 170
2012	49.6% 2,418	49.1% 2,396	1.3% 63
2008	50.6% 2,803	46.3% 2,567	1.0% 53
2004	53.9% 2,847	44.1% 2,330	0.9% 45

In the 2013 gubernatorial election, Republican Chris Christie received 65.9% of the vote (1,968 cast), ahead of Democrat Barbara Buono with 33.0% (985 votes), and other candidates with 1.1% (34 votes), among the 3,030 ballots cast by the borough's 7,657 registered voters (43 ballots were spoiled), for a turnout of 39.6%. In the 2009 gubernatorial election, Republican Chris Christie received 1,848 votes (52.5% vs. 43.2% countywide), ahead of Democrat Jon Corzine with 1,389 votes (39.4% vs. 50.8%), Independent Chris Daggett with 196 votes (5.6% vs. 3.8%) and other candidates with 45 votes (1.3% vs. 0.9%), among the 3,523 ballots cast by the borough's 7,298 registered voters, yielding a 48.3% turnout (vs. 42.7% in the county).

United States Senate election results for Pompton Lakes1
Year	Republican		Democratic		Third party(ies)	
Year	No.	%	No.	%	No.	%
2024	3,075	54.31%	2,424	42.81%	163	2.88%
2018	1,651	39.78%	2,222	53.54%	277	6.67%
2012	2,140	48.46%	2,192	49.64%	84	1.90%
2006	1,590	50.56%	1,491	47.41%	64	2.03%

United States Senate election results for Pompton Lakes2
Year	Republican		Democratic		Third party(ies)	
Year	No.	%	No.	%	No.	%
2020	3,183	50.81%	2,912	46.49%	169	2.70%
2014	1,228	50.83%	1,161	48.05%	27	1.12%
2013	974	55.34%	766	43.52%	20	1.14%
2008	2,263	45.45%	2,601	52.24%	115	2.31%

== Education ==
Pompton Lakes High School.

The Pompton Lakes School District serves students in kindergarten through twelfth grade. As of the 2020–21 school year, the district, comprised of four schools, had an enrollment of 1,755 students and 138.5 classroom teachers (on an FTE basis), for a student–teacher ratio of 12.7:1. Schools in the district (with 2020–21 enrollment data from the National Center for Education Statistics) are Lenox School with 352 students in grades K–5, Lincoln School with 331 students in grades Pre-K–5, Lakeside Middle School with 384 students in grades 6–8 and Pompton Lakes High School with 679 students in grades 9–12. Students from Riverdale (in Morris County) attend the high school as part of a sending/receiving relationship with the Riverdale School District.

St. Mary's School was a Catholic school for pre-kindergarten through eighth grade students that operated under the supervision of the Roman Catholic Diocese of Paterson. Opened in 1951, the school was closed at the end of the 2019–2020 school year in the wake of a ballooning fiscal deficit.

== Media ==
WGHT, a daytime-only station, is located in Pompton Lakes. Founded as WKER in 1964, the station ceased broadcasting on December 14, 2017 as ownership was transferred to the borough. The station resumed broadcasting in April 2019 and is temporarily simulcasting programming from WTBQ in Warwick, New York while local programs are being developed. The transmitting tower for William Paterson University's WPSC-FM is also located in the borough.

The borough also runs a town informational channel named PLTV77, airing on Optimum cable channel 77.

== Transportation ==
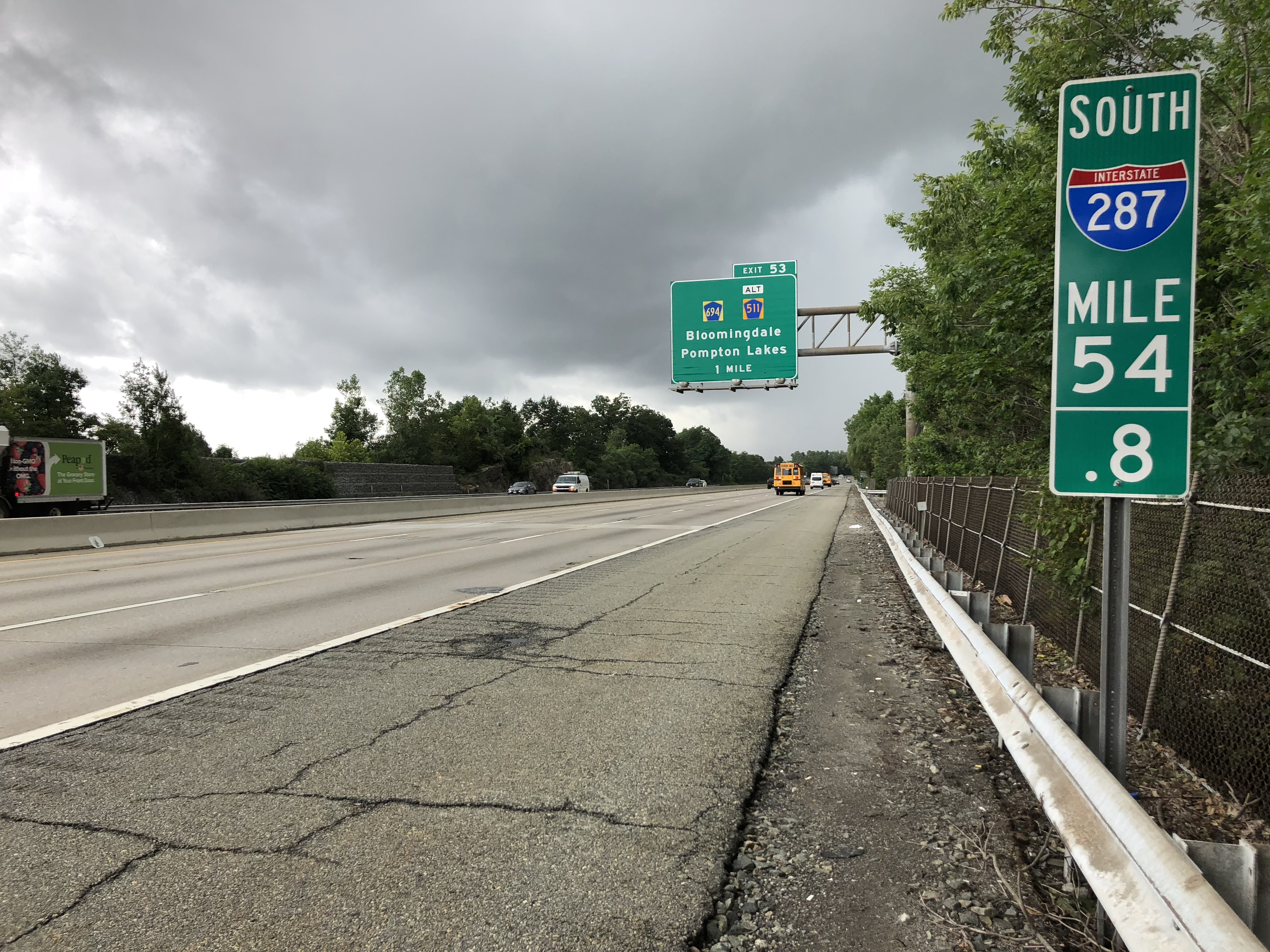
Interstate 287 southbound in Pompton Lakes

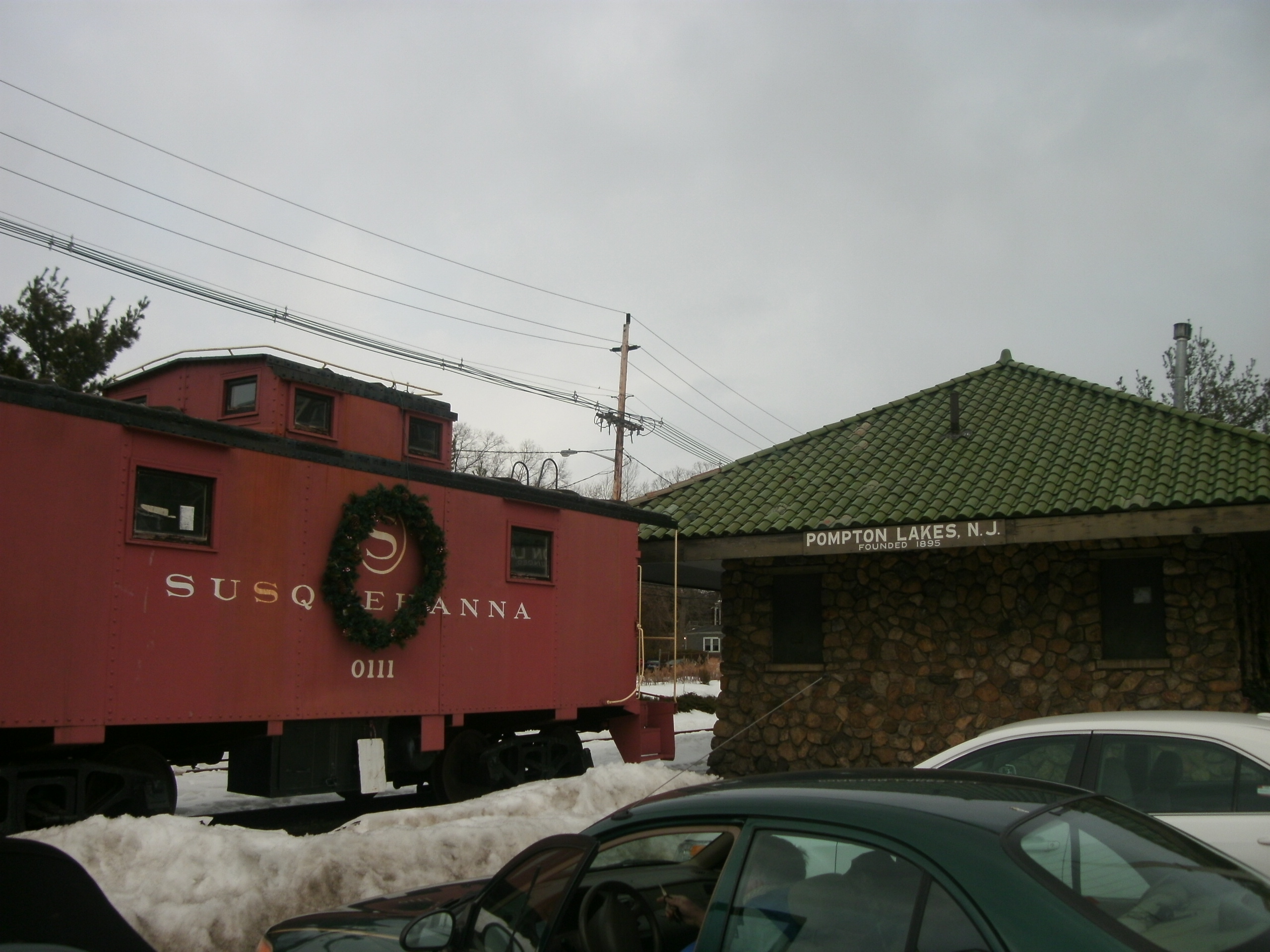
Pompton Lakes train station (now a record store), which was served by the New York, Susquehanna and Western Railway.

=== Roads and highways ===
As of May 2010, the borough had a total of 33.49 miles (53.90 km) of roadways, of which 26.51 miles (42.66 km) were maintained by the municipality, 6.52 miles (10.49 km) by Passaic County and 0.46 miles (0.74 km) by the New Jersey Department of Transportation.

Major roads through Pompton Lakes include I-287 and Paterson-Hamburg Turnpike.

=== Public transportation ===
NJ Transit's 193, 194, and 197 routes stop at various points in the borough, with service to and from Port Authority Bus Terminal in Midtown Manhattan. Local service through Passaic and Bergen counties is offered on the 748 line.

In September 2012, as part of series of budget cuts, NJ Transit discontinued service to Newark on the 75 line.

== Notable people ==
People who were born in, residents of, or otherwise closely associated with Pompton Lakes include:

- Cat Bauer (born 1955), author of contemporary young adult novels
- Cecil B. DeMille (1881–1959), the most commercially successful director in film history, acknowledged as a founding father of cinema in the United States
- Larry Elgart (1922–2017), jazz bandleader who recorded the theme to the long-running dance show American Bandstand with his brother Les (see below)
- Les Elgart (1917–1995), trumpet player who recorded the theme to the long-running dance show American Bandstand with his brother Larry
- Scott Ellsworth (born 1927), radio personality, news presenter and actor
- Charlie Getty (born 1952), played 10 seasons in the NFL, mainly for the Kansas City Chiefs
- Christine Terhune Herrick (1859–1944), author of housekeeping books; built a home in the borough she named The Outlook, where she lived for 13 years
- Marty Isenberg (born 1963), animation writer best known for his role as co-story editor on Beast Machines and Transformers: Animated
- Gary Jennings (1928–1999), author of historical fiction, including Aztec
- Lovell Lawrence Jr., (1915–1971), rocket scientist who developed the first rocket engine to break the sound barrier
- Joe Louis (1914–1981), boxer and heavyweight champion who lived and trained in Pompton Lakes for part of his career
- Wil Mara (born 1966), children's book author and novelist
- Gene Mills (born 1958), freestyle wrestler and wrestling coach
- Steve Monarque (born 1959), New York-based actor, director, writer and musician
- Sharon Pfluger (born 1960), women's college lacrosse and field hockey coach for The College of New Jersey who is the NCAA career wins leader of women's lacrosse
- Twiggy Ramirez (born 1971), bassist and guitarist for Marilyn Manson
- Alvena Sečkar (1916–2012), painter, children's book author and social activist
- Patty Shwartz (born 1961), United States federal judge of United States Court of Appeals for the Third Circuit
- Albert Payson Terhune (1872–1942), author of Lad, A Dog and other dog stories, which were adapted into a 1962 film
- Mary Virginia Terhune (1830–1922), author known by her pen name of Marion Harland; mother of local authors Christine Terhune Herrick and Albert Payson Terhune
- Ognjen Topic (born 1992), Muay Thai kickboxer
- Travis Tuck (1943–2002), metal sculptor known for his hand-crafted weather vanes of repoussé copper and bronze
- Arthur Vervaet (1913–1999), politician who served four terms in the New Jersey General Assembly
- Michael Weiner (1961–2013), Executive Director of the Major League Baseball Players Association from 2009 until his death in 2013
- John Wolters (1945–1997), drummer for Dr. Hook & the Medicine Show
- James Hart Wyld (1912–1953), engineer and rocket scientist who helped to found Reaction Motors; developed a cooling system that is the basis for all modern liquid-propelled rocket motors
