= Pompton Lake =

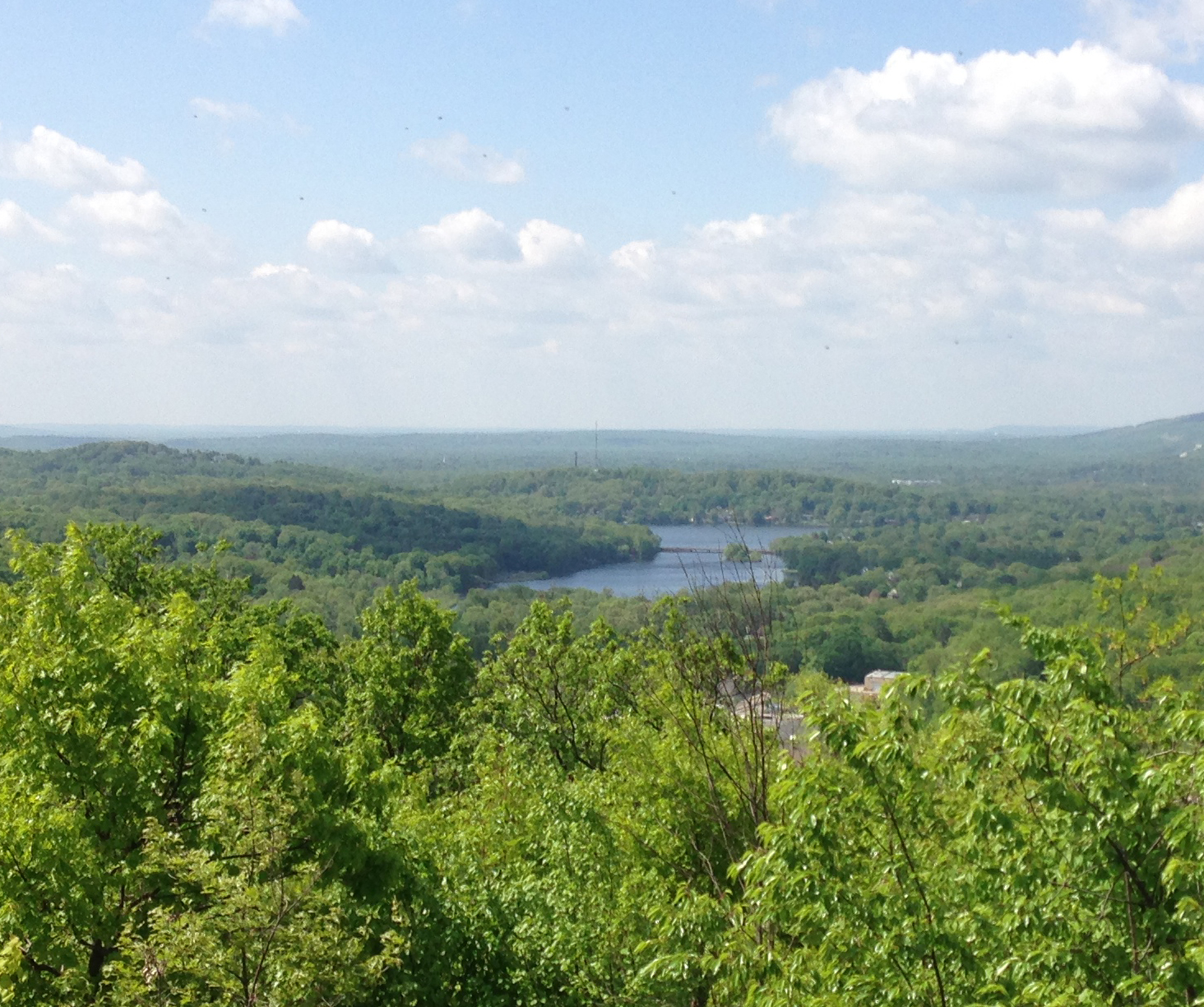
- Pompton Lake viewed from Ramapo Mountain State Forest

- Location within New Jersey Location within the United States
- Location: Pompton Lakes / Wayne, Passaic County, New Jersey
- Coordinates: 41.006589°N 74.274974°W
- Type: Reservoir
- Primary inflows: Ramapo River
- Primary outflows: Ramapo River
- Basin countries: United States
- Surface area: 175 acres (0.71 km^{2})
- Surface elevation: 202 feet (62 m)

Pompton Lake is a 175-acre man-made lake on the Ramapo River which is located within the towns of Pompton Lakes and Wayne in Passaic County, New Jersey. The lake was formed by the construction of the Pompton Lake Dam in 1908 after a prior wooden dam was destroyed by a flood in 1903. The waters impounded in the lake serve as a supplemental drinking source. It is primarily fed by the Ramapo River, but also receives inflow from Acid Brook and smaller tributaries. The Ramapo River continues downstream of Pompton Lake Dam, flowing into the Pompton River and ultimately the Passaic River. The area of the Pompton Lake watershed is 176 square miles. The estate of the author Albert Payson Terhune, Sunnybank, is on the Wayne shore of the lake.
