= Wil Mara =

American author

William P. "Wil" Mara (born 1966) is an American author of more than a hundred books, covering a variety of topics and genres, both fiction and non-fiction. A prolific author of children's books, including numerous biographies for young readers, he has also written seven novels for adults.

== Work ==
Since the mid-1990s, Mara has written scores of books for children and young adults, published mainly by Capstone Press, Children's Press, Marshall Cavendish, and Cherry Lake. The genres and topics range from explanatory science books, and explorations of activities or places, to histories and biographies. Since 2019 he has published several books of children's fiction with supernatural elements, under the rubric "Twisted," issued by Enslow Publishing.

His first novel for an adult audience, Wave, which was released in 2005, chronicles a coastal island community's reaction to an oncoming tsunami. The book eventually became a critical and commercial success, winning a 2005 New Jersey Notable Book Award and establishing Mara in the field of popular international fiction. Mara's next two books, The Draft and The Cut, published in October 2006 and October 2007 by St. Martin's Press, were part of a football-themed "NFL" series. In October 2012, Macmillan Publishing issued Mara's second disaster thriller, The Gemini Virus, which was cited on Amazon.com's "Best New Medical Thrillers" list for 2012. A third novel in this genre, Fallout, about a nuclear disaster, appeared in 2017.

Mara's novel Frame 232, published in 2013, takes its inspiration from the historical assassination of John F. Kennedy; it features the billionaire and detective Jason Hammond, as he attempts to help and protect a young woman, Sheila Baker, who inherits from her mother evidence that sheds new light on the events. That book was followed in 2017 by Nevada Testament, another historical fiction featuring the protagonist Jason Hammond, this time in a story about a lost will of the reclusive billionaire Howard Hughes.

== Personal life ==
Mara was raised on the Jersey Shore. Since 1997 he has lived in Pompton Lakes, New Jersey.
