= Ramapo Valley County Reservation =

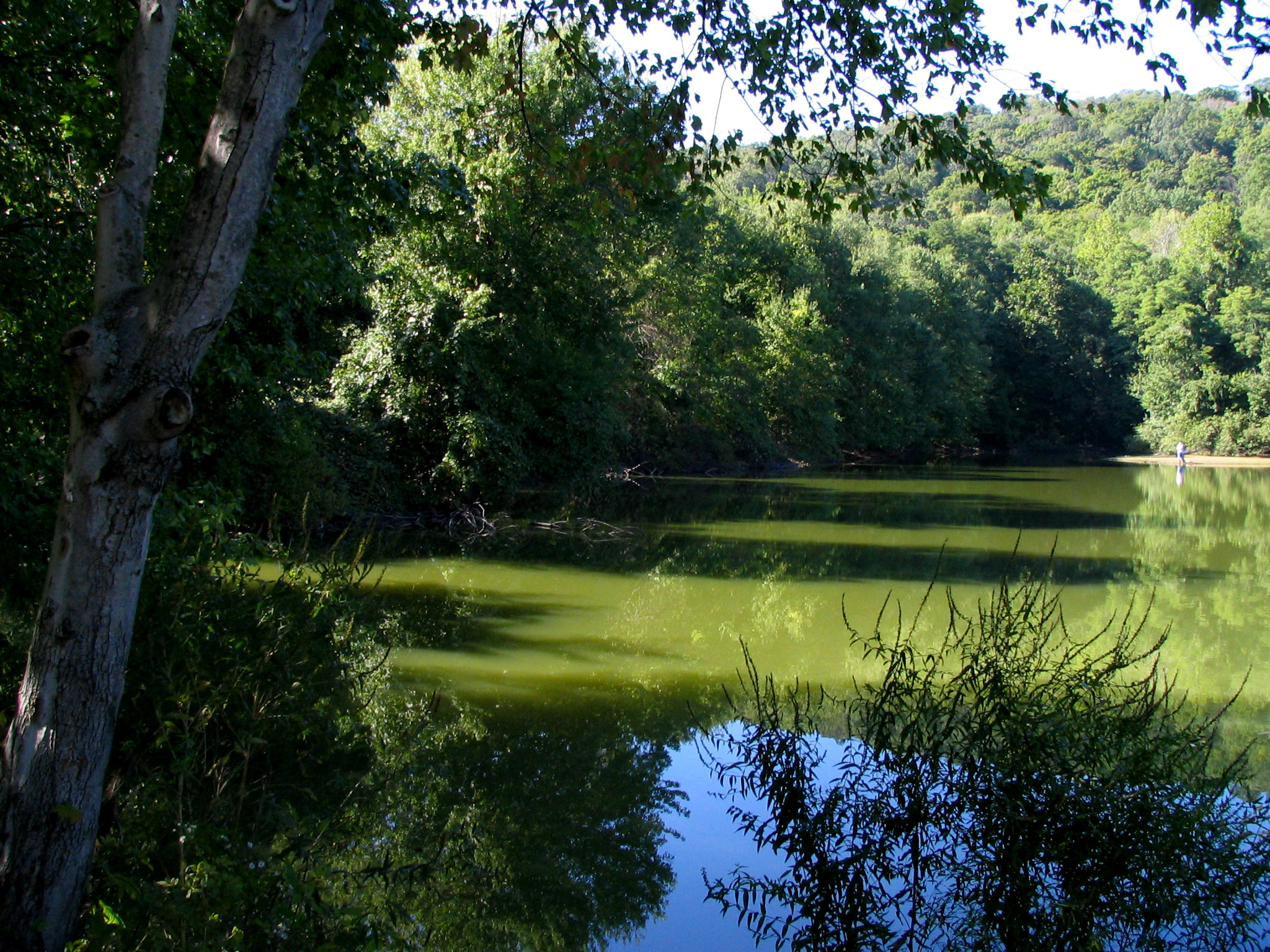
- Scarlet Oak Pond.

- Location within New Jersey Location within the United States
- Location: Mahwah, New Jersey
- Coordinates: 41°05′02″N 74°12′29″W
- Area: 4,000-acre (16 km^{2})
- Operator: Bergen County
- Website: Official website

The Ramapo Valley County Reservation, also known as the Ramapo Reservation, is a 4,000 acres (16 km^{2}) county park located in Mahwah, New Jersey in Bergen County, bordering Ringwood State Park to the north and the Ramapo Mountain State Forest to the south. The park lies on the border of the Piedmont and Highlands geologic provinces.

Ramapo Valley County Reservation provides opportunities for hiking, camping, fishing, canoeing and kayaking, and cross-country skiing. The park offers hiking along a mountain brook with a waterfall, fishing in the Ramapo River, Scarlet Oak Pond, MacMillan Reservoir, and tent camping. Trails connect to the network of trails in the adjoining state forest and state park. The park also affords carry-in access to the Ramapo River for canoe, kayak, and raft owners.

The Reservation is popular among students from nearby Ramapo College, less than a mile away on Route 202, and acts as the school's Environmental Science laboratory.

The park is also a noted geocaching hotspot in conjunction with the aforementioned adjoining parks.

The former Bergen County Police substation near the parking lot serves as the headquarters for New Jersey Search and Rescue.

== October 2015 closure ==
The Ramapo Mountain Reservation was closed indefinitely to visitors on October 15, 2015, while authorities investigated increased bear activity. The ban has since been lifted.
