= WGHT =

Oldies radio station in Pompton Lakes, New Jersey, United States

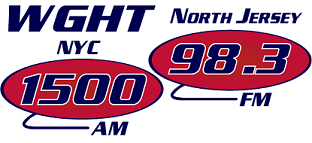

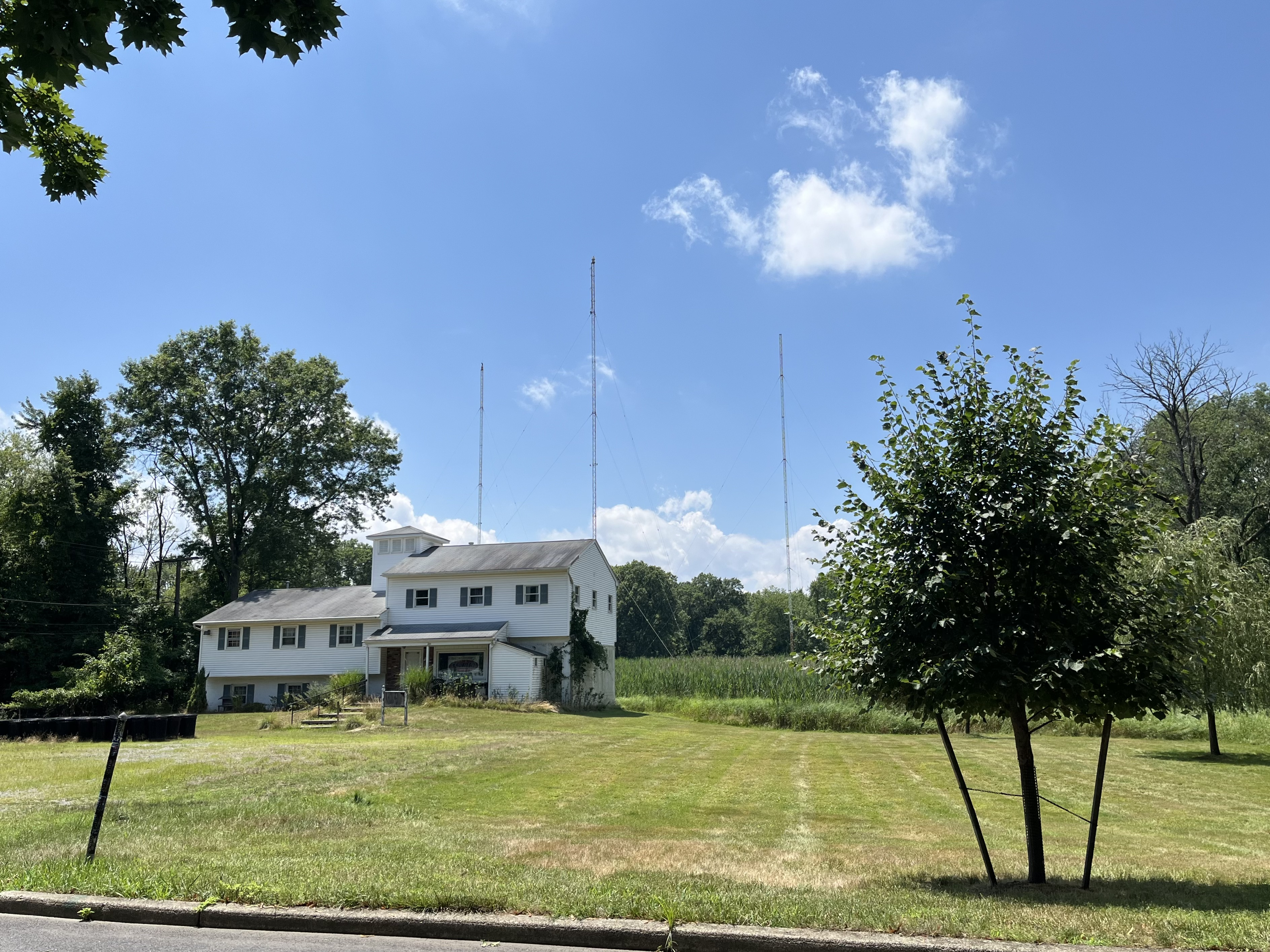
- WGHT in Pompton Lakes, New Jersey - 2024
- Pompton Lakes, New Jersey; United States
- Broadcast area: Northern New Jersey; New York City
- Frequency: 1500 kHz
- Branding: North Jersey 98.3; NYC 1500

Programming
- Language: English
- Format: Full-service radio

Ownership
- Owner: Borough of Pompton Lakes (Sale pending to FST Broadcasting Corporation)
- Sister stations: WTBQ

History
- First air date: May 27, 1965
- Former call signs: WKER (1964–1993)
- Call sign meaning: "Gold Hits"

Technical information
- Licensing authority: FCC
- Facility ID: 40078
- Class: D
- Power: 1,000 watts (daytime-only)
- Transmitter coordinates: 40°58′51.4″N 74°17′4.5″W
- Translator: 98.3 W252ED (Pompton Lakes)

Links
- Public license information: Public file; LMS
- Webcast: Listen live
- Website: wghtamfm.com

WGHT (1500 AM) is a radio station owned by the Borough of Pompton Lakes, New Jersey and licensed to serve the same municipality.

The station simulcasts Warwick, New York station WTBQ's full-service radio format, and is a "daytimer" signing on at dawn and off at dusk, to protect other stations on the 1500 kHz frequency, i.e. clear-channel stations.

== History ==
=== Original WKER era ===
WGHT originally signed on as WKER, with FCC records showing WKER's license being granted as of May 27, 1965, and with station call letters representing its founder, Bob Kerr. Kerr published an industry guide called the KERRadio Album Digest, and provided syndicated programming to stations in the US and Canada. As a result his station, WKER served as a test market station for the nearby, much larger, New York City market in the 1960s. The station initially ran a top-40 format that included local news. In 1964 WKER hired Tom Niven from WCHA in Chambersburg, Pennsylvania. When Bob Kerr died, Tom Niven and office manager Lee Novak became the station's owners in 1982, until the station was sold to John Silliman's Mariana Broadcasting in 1993, when Bob Kerr's estate sold the radio station. Silliman was formerly an on-air personality at various other radio stations over the years. Upon taking ownership, Silliman applied for a call sign change to WGHT which stood for "Gold HiTs", with the station tagline "Gold Hits 1500. This application was accepted by the FCC on August 6, 1993.

=== First WGHT era ===
WGHT began by not altering the format, but eventually broadcasting an oldies-classic hits music format playing a deep and wide variety of music from 1952 to about 2000. Personnel at the time included midday air personality as well as general manager John Silliman and program director Jimmy Howes. Howes was also WGHT's chief engineer and operations manager. WGHT's News Director was award-winning reporter and newscaster Mike Forte. Art Rooney (from The Uncle Floyd Show) hosted an afternoon drive show.

During this period of time, the station had a history of being a launching pad for syndicated and New York City radio talent, including Fox Sports personality Kevin Burkhardt, singer-songwriter Tracy Chapman and WABC's Noam Laden and Deborah Valentine.

The station was also an NAB Marconi Radio Award finalist and an NAB Crystal Radio Award finalist more than a dozen times, and received Associated Press News Awards. WGHT's local sports department won dozens of awards for their local high school sports coverage and broadcasts. WGHT's news department was honored with awards from the Associated Press and the New Jersey Broadcasters Association in 2010, 2011, 2012, 2013, 2014, 2015, 2016, and 2017. The WGHT Morning Show with Jimmy Howes and Greta Latona was honored with dozens of awards from the Garden State Journalists Association for their celebrity interviews and on-air contests.

=== Silent period ===
With the dawn of the 21st Century, selling advertising was becoming difficult for small AM stations like WGHT, thus revenue was dropping. Options such as brokering the station various times of the day were looked at and it was determined that if the station could not be live and local with the programming local people are used to, it would be better to just close the station down. In June 2017, it was announced that WGHT would close late in the summer or in the fall. On September 22, 2017, Mariana Broadcasting filed an application with the FCC for consent to transfer ownership of WGHT as part of a donation to the Borough of Pompton Lakes. Pompton Lakes had no plans to operate the station, and looked for a partner to run it. On December 15, 2017, ownership was transferred and the station went silent. John Silliman conducted the signoff.

A low-power FM translator application was granted in May 2018 as part of the FCC's "AM Revitalization Program", but not finished. On December 13, 2018, WGHT began temporarily and sporadically simulcasting Middletown, New York station WALL to keep its broadcast license valid.

=== Second WGHT era ===
In March 2019, Frank Truatt, owner of 1110 WTBQ/93.5 W228CG in Warwick, New York, announced plans to begin operating WGHT under a Local Marketing Agreement with the option to purchase the station (and its still-approved construction permit for an FM translator at 98.3, W252ED). WGHT resumed broadcasting in April 2019 and will temporarily simulcast programming from WTBQ/W228CG while local programs are being developed.

The station's FM translator began broadcasting on May 7, 2020.
