= WTBQ =

Radio station in Warwick, New York

Coordinates: 41°16′51.3″N 74°21′44.6″W

- Warwick, New York; United States
- Broadcast area: Hudson Valley; North Jersey
- Frequency: 1110 kHz
- Branding: WTBQ

Programming
- Format: Full-service
- Affiliations: ABC; Motor Racing Network; Performance Racing Network

Ownership
- Owner: Frank R. Truatt; (FST Broadcasting Corporation)

History
- First air date: July 27, 1969

Technical information
- Licensing authority: FCC
- Facility ID: 22292
- Class: D
- Power: 500 watts (days only)
- Translator: 93.5 W228CG (Warwick)
- Repeater: 1500 WGHT (Pompton Lakes)

Links
- Public license information: Public file; LMS
- Webcast: Listen live
- Website: wtbq.com

WTBQ (1110 AM) is an commercial radio station licensed to Warwick, New York, United States. The last locally owned radio station in Orange County (and one of the few in the entire Hudson Valley), WTBQ serves both Orange County and Northern New Jersey. The station has a diversified format consisting of news, oldies music, specialty music shows, talk shows, and specialty programming. The station is also relayed full-time over low-power FM translator W228CG (93.5 FM).

== History ==
Local media figure Ed Klein brought WTBQ to air July 27, 1969, with studios originally located in the village of Warwick. The call letters come from Klein's young daughter's affection for her teddy bear. Originally, WTBQ had a "Beautiful Music" format (dubbed "The Casual Q"), in contrast to Top 40 music, which Klein hated. WTBQ also had a strong emphasis on news, both local and national (the station was a Mutual Broadcasting System affiliate from 1974-78 before later switching to ABC). In the mid-1970s the station evolved to more of a Middle of the Road format. By 1978, the station switched to a "town and country" format playing half Adult Contemporary songs and half country music.

In 1982, WTBQ was purchased by Jimmy Sturr, who in 1984 moved the studios to the "Professional Building" at 62 North Main Street in nearby Florida, New York. The station moved to more of a Mainstream Adult Contemporary music format but ran Jimmy Sturr's Polka Show once a week on the weekend. After another change in ownership (to George Dacre's "Goodtime Broadcasting") later in the 1980s, the station switched to Adult Standards. By the early 1990s, the station had financial problems and went silent on May 8, 1993. In May 1994, the station's current owner Frank "Smokin'" Truatt bought the station, returning it to the air on July 1, 1994.

From its inception, WTBQ has been strictly an AM "daytimer", signing on 15 minutes before dawn and signing off 15 minutes after dusk, with exceptions are made in event of a local news emergency such as a snowstorm. Still, WTBQ became the first station in the Hudson Valley to carry its programs on the internet in 1999; it was also the first area radio station with a website, back in 1995. Beginning in 1997, WTBQ began adding more specialty shows on weekends such as a polka show, classic country music show, NASCAR racing, an Irish program, a diversified music show, among others. By 1999, the station was running mostly specialty shows on weekends and a few during the week. By about 2003, the station began gradually adding more such programming during the week.

On November 30, 2007, WTBQ moved from the Village of Florida back to Warwick. Ed Klein died on October 18, 2008, at the age of 86. WTBQ celebrated its 40th anniversary with a special ceremony at the station's broadcasting tower where a plaque was placed at the antenna site, honoring Ed Klein for having signed-on the station in 1969. Also, in 2008, WTBQ would add an FM translator station, allowing the station to broadcast 24 hours a day, boosting station listening and sales.

In June 2012, WTBQ moved to Sanfordville Road. On July 1, 2014, local officials (including State Senator William Larkin and Orange County Executive Steve Neuhaus) honored Frank Truatt's 20 years of independent ownership and giving back to the community. A January 2014 article in The Wall Street Journal honored Frank Truatt for owning one of the last of the real "community" radio stations in the New York metro area.

== FM translator ==
WTBQ became one of the first American AM stations to use an FM translator when it began airing on W256BD on January 25, 2008. The arrangement, made possible by a Special Temporary Authority from the Federal Communications Commission and Digital Radio Broadcasting, allowed WTBQ to broadcast its programs 24 hours a day via an FM antenna located on WTBQ's AM broadcast tower. The translator also broadcasts from WTBQ's tower, located in the Town of Warwick.

At 1:30 pm on January 28, 2011, WTBQ switched its translator frequency to 93.5 MHz, after just more than three years at 99.1 MHz. The new translator, W228CG, broadcasts at 250 watts. A considerable upgrade from the previous 19 watts, the coverage area is about 50% larger than on 99.1.

Beginning in April 2019, WTBQ began a simulcast on WGHT AM 1500 in Pompton Lakes, New Jersey.
