= Ramapo Lake =

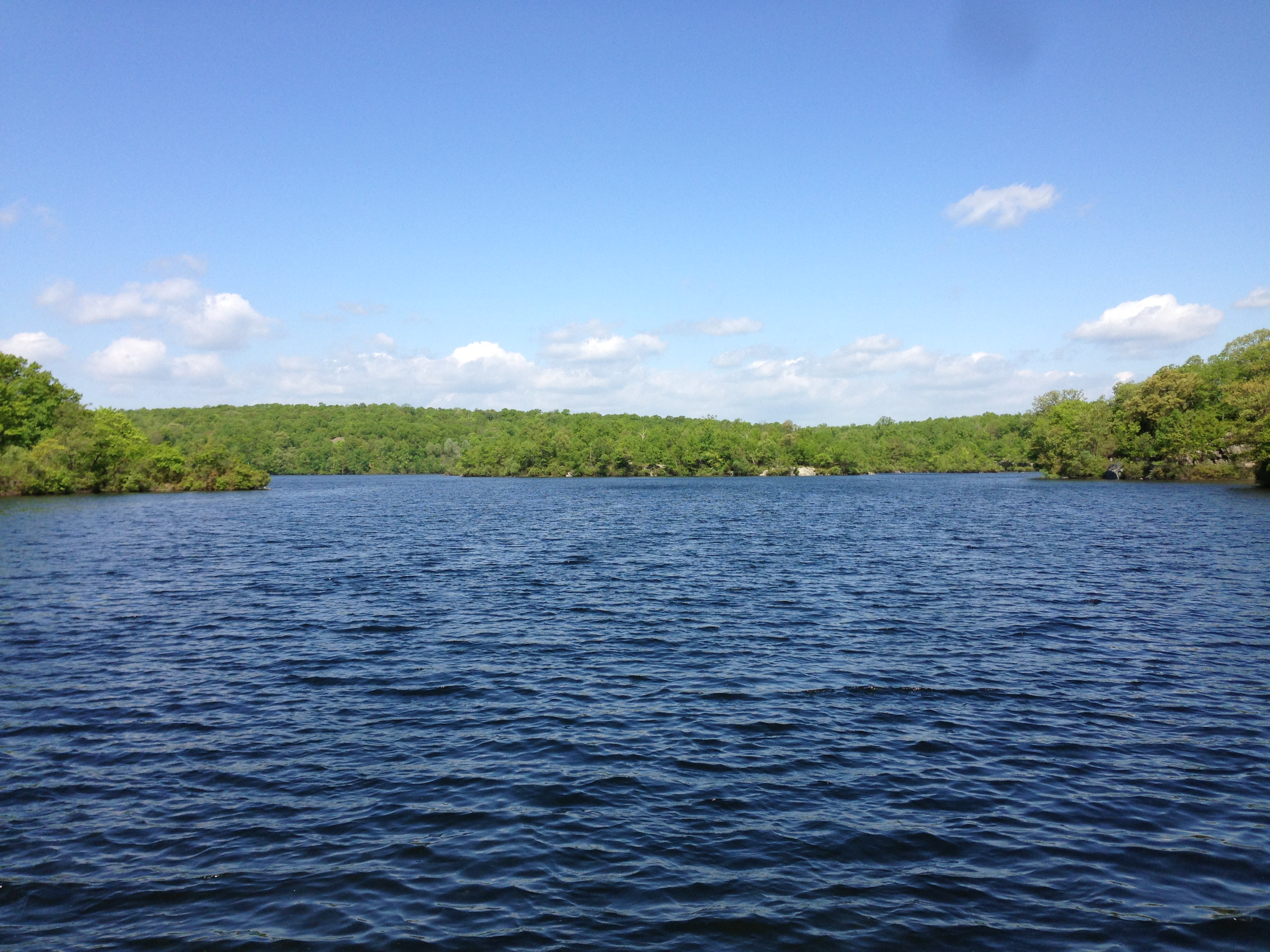
- View northwest from Ramapo Lake Dam

- Location within New Jersey Location within the United States
- Coordinates: 41.037995°N 74.262599°W
- Type: Reservoir
- Surface area: 120 acres (49 ha)
- Max. depth: 22 ft (6.7 m)
- Surface elevation: 550 ft (170 m)

Ramapo Lake is a 120-acre man-made lake in Ramapo Mountain State Forest in Northern New Jersey.

Ramapo Lake originally consisting of a 25-acre pond named Rotten Poel (Rats Pond) by the Dutch. It was enlarged and deepened by Jacob Rogers in the late 19th century when he built a stone dam across its outlet.

== Incidents ==
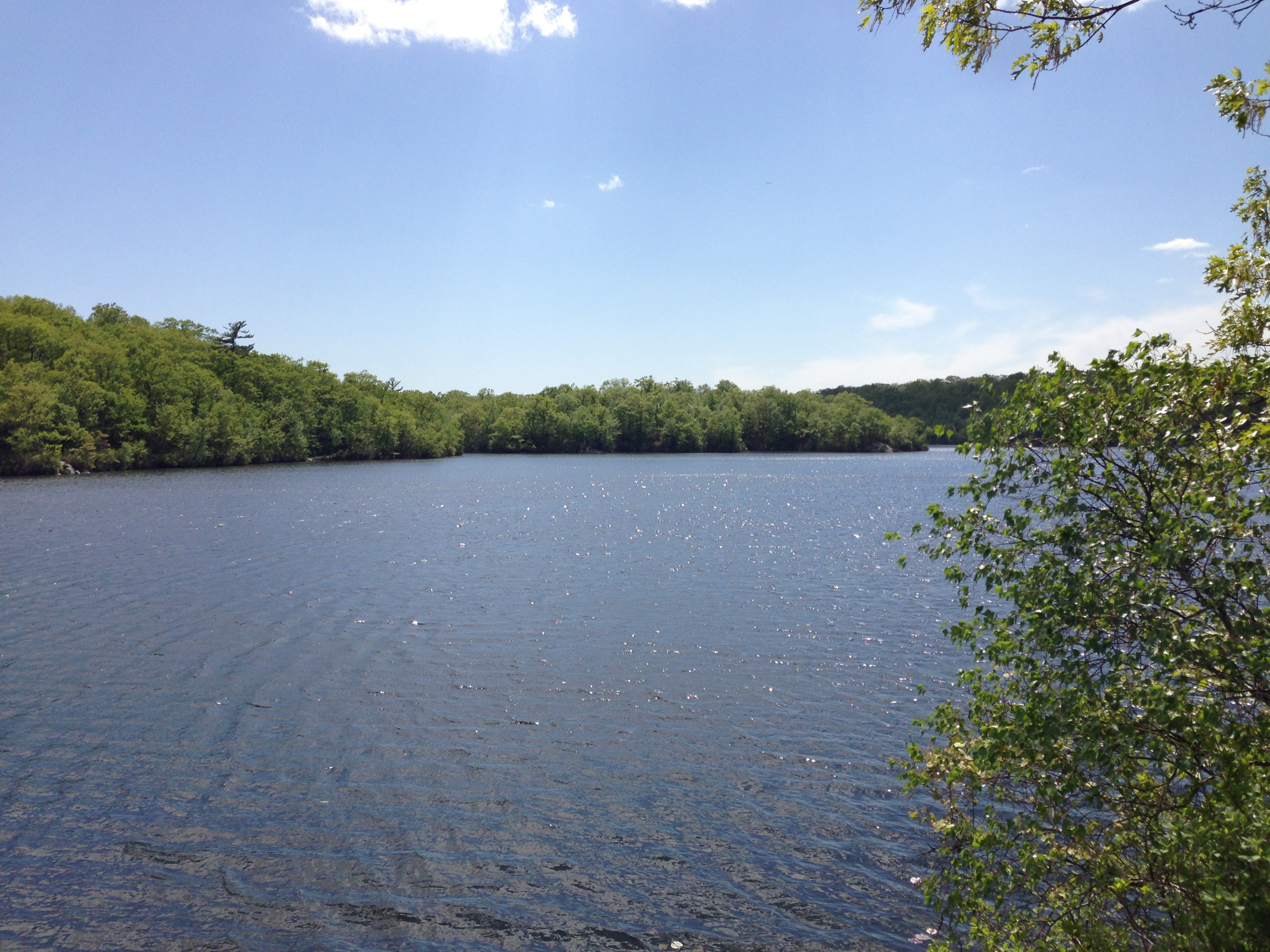
View southwest across Ramapo Lake in Ramapo Mountain State Forest, New Jersey

On August 7, 2018, at approximately 7 PM, two teens drowned in the lake.
