= Ramapo River =

River in the United States

Coordinates: 40.9800°N 74.2816°W

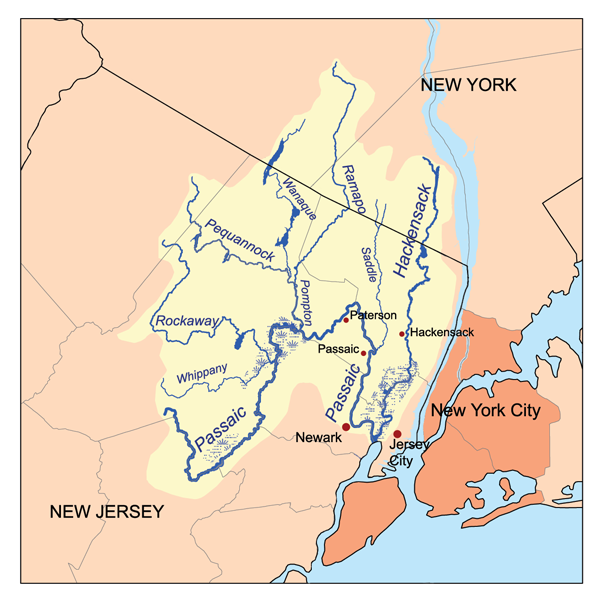
Map of the Passaic/Hackensack watershed

The Ramapo River is a tributary of the Pompton River in southern New York and northern New Jersey in the United States. It rises in Monroe, New York, and flows into the Pompton approximately 30 mi (48 km) downstream.

== Course ==
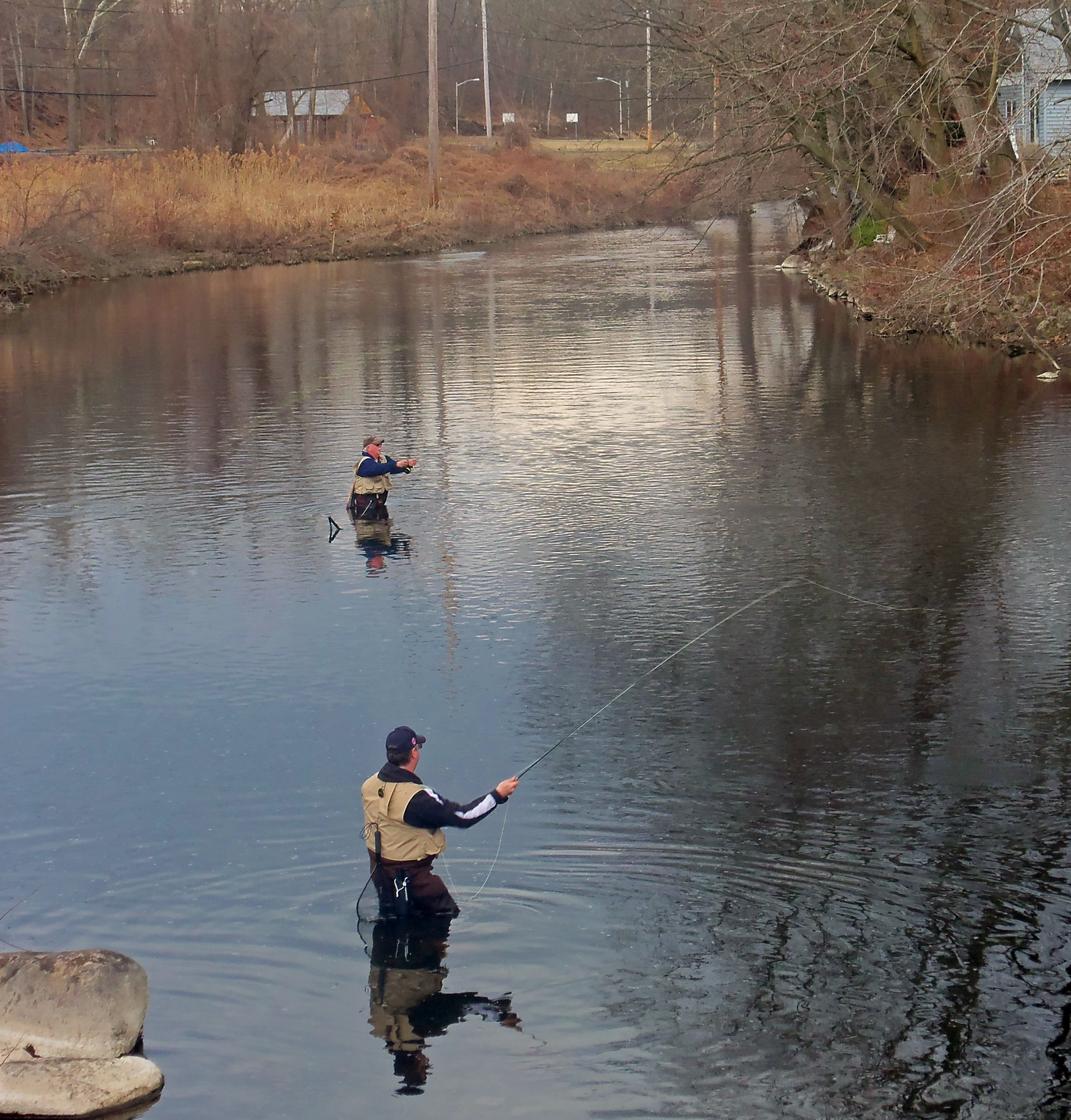
Fly fishermen on the Ramapo at Tuxedo, New York

The Ramapo River rises in Round Lake, a small freshwater lake in the town of Monroe, New York, in a mountainous area of central Orange County, New York. It flows southeast through the village, where the river was dammed in 1741 for a sawmill and grist mill. It continues to Harriman, where a chemical plant, Nepera Chemical, was built. While the plant has been dismantled, a superfund site has been designated at the location where barrels of toxic chemicals were buried. At Harriman, the river turns south into western Rockland County, where it flows through the hamlet and town of Ramapo, New York, then into northern Bergen County, New Jersey. In New Jersey, it flows southwest along the east side of the ridge of the Ramapo Mountains. Following a course that runs above the Ramapo Fault for about 9 mi (14 km), the river then flows into Potash Lake in Oakland, and from there into Pompton Lake in Pompton Lakes. The river then flows out of Pompton Lake, forming the border between Pompton Lakes and Wayne. The Ramapo forms a confluence with the Pequannock River along the border between Pequannock and Wayne, forming the Pompton River, which eventually flows into the Passaic River. A portion of the river's water is diverted to the nearby Wanaque Reservoir.

New York State Route 17, the Port Jervis commuter railroad line, and the New York State Thruway were all constructed in the Ramapo river valley between Harriman and Suffern, New York.

The river is a popular destination for fly fishing for trout.

== History ==
Areas along the Ramapo River were inhabited by bands of the Lenape tribe, a large group who inhabited much of the coastal areas of the mid-Atlantic region. Some of their people retreated to the mountains under pressure from Dutch and English colonists. The Lenape occupied western Long Island, the area of present-day metropolitan New York, northern and southern New Jersey, and the Delaware River Valley south through Pennsylvania into Delaware.

Many smaller archaeological sites in Oakland, New Jersey, were found to have been inhabited by prehistoric indigenous peoples. Fossilized crustaceans can be found along the banks of the river near Oakland.

Descendants of the Lenape include the non-federally recognized Ramapough Lenape Indian Tribe (also known as the Ramapough Mountain Indians), recognized in 1980 by the state of New Jersey. Many Ramapough Lenape people have lived in what is now Mahwah and Ringwood, New Jersey, and Hillburn, New York, since the late colonial period. They also intermarried with people of other ethnicities.

Torne Mountain (1,130 ft or 340 m; shown on topographic maps as "High Torne"), in Harriman State Park, overlooks the Ramapo Pass and remnants of the once-thriving Ramapo Iron Works. During the American Revolution, the Torne served as a lookout for British ship movements on the Hudson.

== See also ==
- List of New Jersey rivers
- List of New York rivers
