= Ramapo Mountain State Forest =

Forest in New Jersey, United States

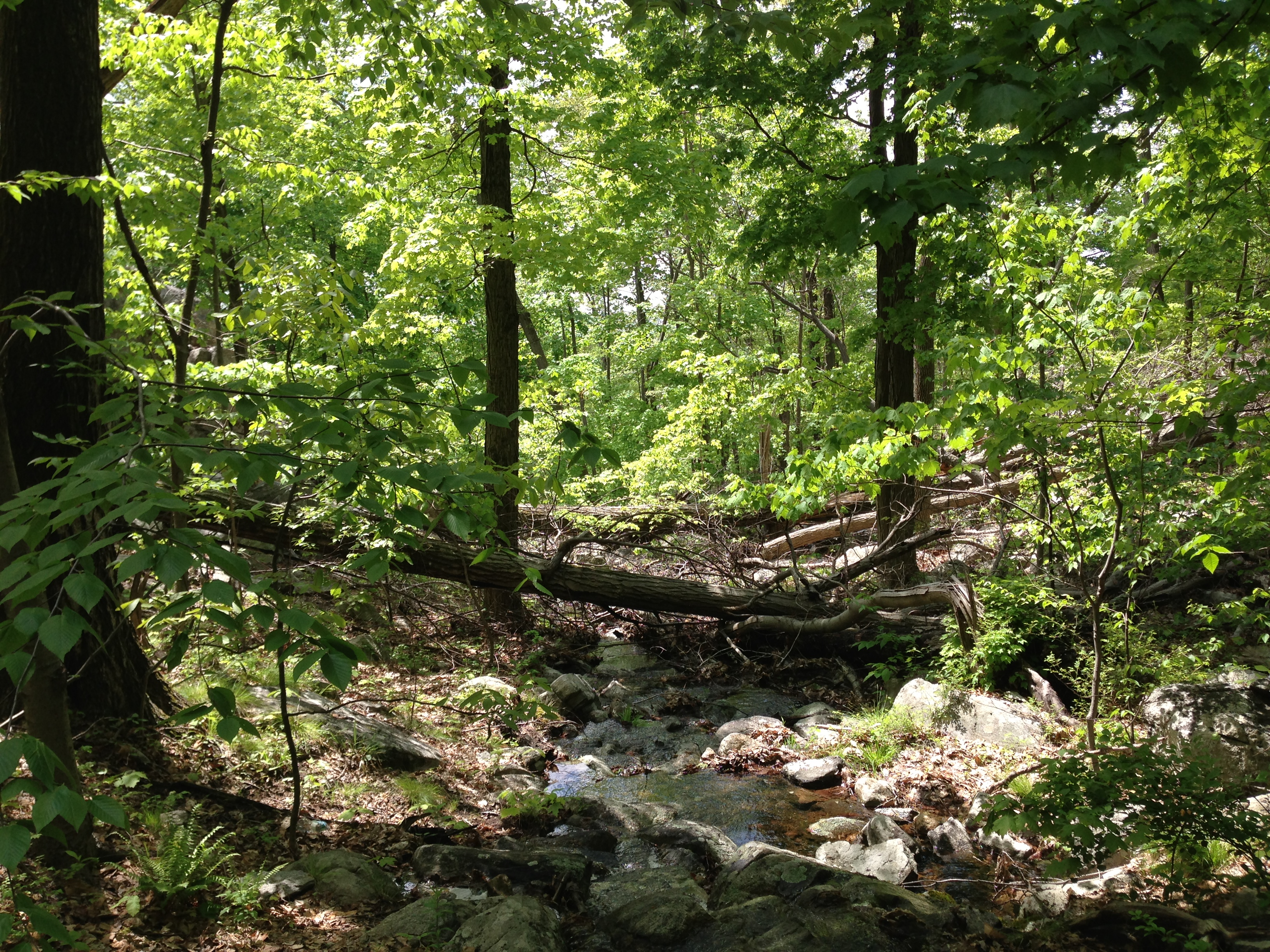
- A stream along the Hoeferlin Trail in 2013

- Location within New Jersey Location within the United States
- Location: Bergen and Passaic Counties
- Coordinates: 41°01′58″N 74°15′07″W
- Area: 4,200-acre (17 km^{2})
- Operator: New Jersey Division of Parks and Forestry
- Website: Official website

Ramapo Mountain State Forest is a 4,200-acre (17 km^{2}) state forest in Bergen and Passaic Counties in New Jersey. The park is operated and maintained by the New Jersey Division of Parks and Forestry.

The park offers hiking, hunting, canoeing, fishing (including ice fishing), cross-country skiing, horseback riding and mountain biking. Several trails lead to views of the New York City skyline. The 1,417 acres (5.73 km^{2}) Ramapo Lake Natural Area within the park has several trails to excellent views from rock outcroppings and ledges. A 120-acre (0.5 km^{2}) mountain lake provides fishing and birdwatching (but no swimming).

The forest borders the Ramapo Valley County Reservation, a part of the Bergen County park system, and Ringwood State Park in Bergen and Passaic counties. It is part of a trail system which runs along the ridge of the Ramapo Mountains north through Mahwah, New Jersey and into Rockland County, New York.

The forest contains the ruins of Van Slyke Castle, a popular destination for hikers.

== History ==
In the 1920s Clifford MacEvoy began buying up property and deeds to form the Bergen Country Hunting and Fishing Club. At about this time, a small pond located on the property called "Roten" pond (Dutch for muskrat), was dammed up to form the much larger Ramapo Lake, and some small parcels of land surrounding the lake were sold to private buyers for building lots, one including a television celebrity, lawyer and noted author.

In 1924, at the top of the mountain he built a granite, brick and stucco manor house, designed by Mr. MacEvoy for his wife and his daughter. He named the estate RyeCliff after his wife's maiden name, Ryerson, and his first name, Clifford. Another mansion was also built on top of a hill overlooking Ramapo Lake, it was destroyed in a tragic fire one New Year's Eve many years later.

The house includes a screened in porch, a large living room as well as a family room, each room with hand-hewn chestnut beams, a stone fireplace, and views of Ramapo Lake and the surrounding mountains to the west.

At some point around 1920 – 1928 a tower was added to the top of the mountain. It was originally a water tower erected on the site of what is now the Wanaque Reservoir, built in the early 1900s by Clifford MacEvoy. Mr. MacEvoy relocated the tower to Ryecliff and enclosed it in mountain stone so as to blend in with the house itself as well as the natural environment. The Observation Tower stands 65 feet (19.8 m) high at a ground elevation of 825 feet (251.5 m). Its five stories include two floors with toilet and, on the fifth floor, the room contains a fireplace. A hatch on the fifth floor leads to a roof with incredible views of Ramapo Park and Lake, the Wanaque Reservoir, mountains to the west and to the east, New York City.

In 1976, the majority of Ryecliff's area was conveyed, by the trustee of the MacEvoy estate, to the State of New Jersey to become what is now the "Ramapo Mountain State Forest". The state forest built a network of hiking trails with the help of the New Jersey Youth Conservation Corps in 1978, some of which are still in use today. The forest was unfortunately sliced in two by the controversial extension of Route 287 in the early 1990s by the NJ Department of Transportation. A footbridge was built over the highway along the Cannonball Trail to mitigate this issue.

Nestled at the top of the mountain, however the private Ryecliff estate, complete with tennis court, guest house, horse stable, private pond, and of course the Tower that can be seen for miles around. The Ryecliff estate has recently been put up for sale.

=== Van Slyke Castle ===
Van Slyke Castle (41°2′41.5″N 74°15′46″W), originally known as Foxcroft, is a ruined early 20th century mansion in the state forest that was built to resemble a castle. The home was built by stockbroker William Porter in the early 1900s. He named the property Foxcroft, as it was built on Fox Hill.

The property was abandoned by the 1950s. It was subsequently burned by vandals. The site is accessible to hikers.

== See also ==
- List of New Jersey state forests
- List of New Jersey state parks
